= Sardar Patel Vidyalaya =

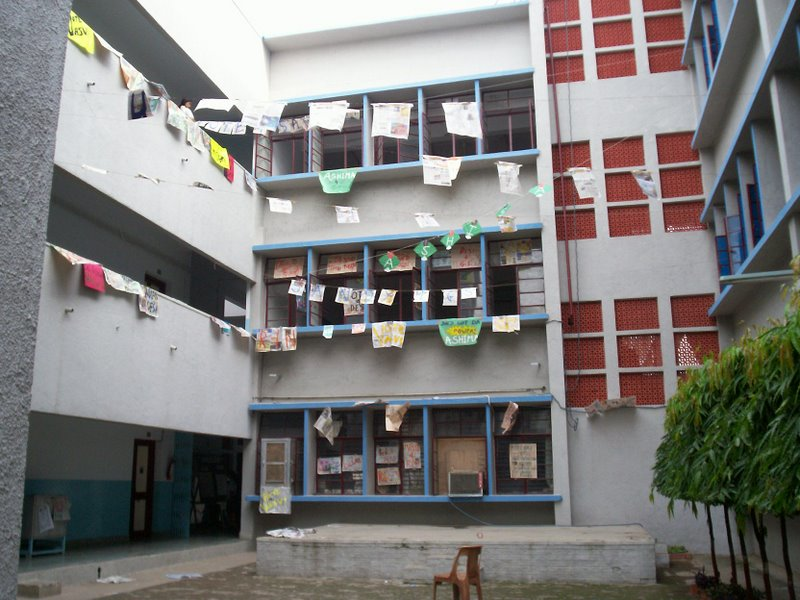
- Lodi Road, Delhi; India

Information
- Motto: विद्यैव धनमक्षयम्
- Established: 14 August 1957
- Principal: Anuradha Joshi
- Faculty: 110
- Grades: Nursery till 12th
- Enrollment: 1650
- Website: spvdelhi.org

Sardar Patel Vidyalaya (SPV) is an education school located in Lodi Estate, New Delhi, India. The school is named after a leader of the Indian independence movement, and independent India's first Home Minister and Deputy Prime Minister, Sardar Vallabhbhai Patel.

== Academics ==
It is a private school in India that employs Hindi as a medium of instruction in primary school. Though primarily subjects such as Math, science and social studies are taught in Hindi till class 5th, students are taught 'technical terms' which are the English counterparts of whatever they learnt.

Students are provided instruction in four languages. From 1st grade, it is Hindi medium. English is the medium of education from the Class VI onwards. From Class VI, students have to choose between Gujarati, Tamil, Bengali and Urdu as their fourth language. Hindi and Sanskrit are mandatory until Class VIII. In Class IX, students are asked to choose between Hindi and Sanskrit.

== Principals ==
- Raghubhai M. Nayak
- Vibha Parthasarathy
- Y.K. Mago
- Mukesh Shelath
- Kusum Lata Warikoo
- Vijaya Subramaniam (officiating)
- Ms. Anuradha Joshi (2007–present)

== Notable alumni ==
=== Administration and civil services and diplomatic services ===
- Achal Kumar Jyoti, Indian Administrative Service officer; Former Chief Election Commissioner of India, Former Chief Secretary, Commissioner of Education Govt of Gujarat
- Vineeta Rai, Indian Administrative Service officer; former Revenue Secretary, Government of India
- Late Abhijit Sen, Padma Bhushan and Former Member of the Planning Commission of India
- TCA Raghvan, A former Indian diplomat of the Indian Foreign Service with considerable experience in South Asia policy issues and considered an expert on Pakistan studies.From 2013 to 2015 he was the High Commissioner of India to Pakistan. In July 2018 he was appointed Director General of the Indian Council of World Affairs.

=== Arts and media ===
- Varun Badola, television actor
- Richa Chaddha, Bollywood actress
- Nandita Das, film actress, director
- Ketan Mehta, film director
- Shahana Goswami, Bollywood actress
- Eeshit Narain, Film Cinematographer
- Poorna Jagannathan, Hollywood and Bollywood actor and producer
- Anusha Rizvi, Bollywood film director
- Swara Bhaskar, Bollywood Actress
- Suraj Sharma, film actor
- Pakhi Tyrewala, actress
- Sudhir Pandey, veteran TV and film actor Well known for his performances in popular Doordarshan serials like Buniyaad
- Shrikrishan Sharma, a mastro of slide guitar and Vichitra Veena in Indian Classical Music. He featured in programmes broadcast by All India Radio and on television for over three decades
- Aditya Arya, has played a pivotal role in the establishment of India Photo Archive Foundation and the Neel Dongre Awards/Grants for Excellence in Photography, His India Photo Archive Foundation and The Municipal Corporation of Gurugram, has set up Museo Camera, in Gurugram that is dedicated to the art and history of photography.

=== Literature ===
- Aman Sethi, Writer and Correspondent for The Hindu

=== Corporate ===
- S. Ramadorai, CEO, Tata Consultancy Services and recipient of the Padma Bhushan
- Sanjay Mehrotra, CEO of Micron Technology and co-founder of SanDisk

=== Science and technology ===
- Suvrat Raju, Physicist
- Kapil Hari Paranjape, Mathematician
- Vidyut Mohan, social entrepreneur and Earthshot Prize winner

=== Academia ===
- Shalini Randeria, A Rhodes Scholar and social anthropologist/sociologist. She was Rector of the Institute for Human Sciences (IWM) in Vienna and Professor of Social Anthropology and Sociology at the Graduate Institute of International and Development Studies (IHEID) in Geneva, where she was also Director of the Albert Hirschman Centre on Democracy. She holds the Excellence Chair at the University of Bremen, where she leads a research group on “soft authoritarianisms"
- Mohit Randeria, Professor, Department of Physics, Ohio State University, Fellow of the American Physical Society, Distinguished Alumni Award, Indian Institute of Technology, Delhi Government of India for scientific research, awarded him the Shanti Swarup Bhatnagar Prize for Science and Technology.
- Shivaji Sondhi, A theoretical physicist who is currently the Wykeham Professor of Physics in the Rudolf Peierls Centre for Theoretical Physics at the University of Oxford

=== Environmentalism ===
- Ashish Kothari, has been a member of Steering Committees of the World Commission on Protected Areas (WCPA) and IUCN Commission on Environmental, Economic, and Social Policy (CEESP) He has also been a teacher of environment at Indian Institute of Public Administration, New Delhi.

=== Sports ===
- Kagayama, Indian Volleyball team
- Deep Dasgupta, Indian cricket team
- Lt.Col.Rajpal Singh, Indian judo

- Ajay Jadeja, Indian cricket team and TV commentator
- Murali Kartik, Indian cricket team
- Gagan Khoda, Indian cricket team
- Vivek Razdan, Indian cricket team
- Rahul Sanghvi, Indian cricket team
- Tejaswin Shankar, Indian Track and field

=== Law ===
- Karuna Nundy, Senior Advocate, Supreme Court of India
- Menaka Guruswamy, Senior Advocate, Supreme Court of India

== See also ==
- List of schools in Delhi
