= Aditya Arya Archive =

Indian photographic archive

Aditya Arya Archive is one of the earliest photographic archives in India, engaged in the digitizing, documentation, annotation, restoration and preservation of photographic material of archival significance in India. Aditya Arya Archive is led by Aditya Arya, who is an eminent commercial photographer.

== History ==
The Aditya Arya Archive began with the historical collection of photojournalist Kulwant Roy, presented to Aditya Arya. Roy (1914–1984) was among the handful of photojournalists in India who documented the eventful years immediately before and after independence. He was a close friend of the Arya family and left his surviving photographic negatives and prints to Aditya Arya. These prints and negatives remained forgotten in boxes for nearly 23 years after his death, until their inheritor Aditya Arya, began restoring and cataloguing them. The archive included many unpublished pictures of national leaders and events of the Indian pre and post-independence era and were brought to the public domain after the establishment of the Aditya Arya Archive. One of the outcomes of the unearthing and restoration process of the archive was that many images from the last years of British rule and the early decades after India's independence, which were reprinted over the decades and credited to random journalists, turned out to be Roy's work and have now been duly acknowledged. One of many such images is the iconic 1939 photograph of Mohandas K. Gandhi and Ali Jinnah in a heated argument, which has now been credited to Roy by Getty Images. Many historians believe that the archive may shed light on the key moments in India's independence movement.

== Rare and iconic images from the Aditya Arya Archive ==
Aditya Arya Archive contains some rare and iconic images from the period of India's independence struggle and thereafter. These include rare photographs of Jawaharlal Nehru, Gandhi and Sardar Patel huddled in an animated discussion, Mahatma Gandhi in debate with Mohd. Ali Jinnah, with whom he was seldom seen with, Jacqueline Kennedy sharing a laugh with Pt. Nehru, Pt. Nehru wearing khaki shorts heading to attend a Congress Seva Dal Volunteers rally in Kanpur, Pt. Nehru in cricket gear, the Indian National Army Trials, Pt. Nehru bidding farewell to his grandson Rajiv Gandhi as he leaves for a tour, Congress Party meetings, Muslim League meetings, Mahatma Gandhi's visit to the North West Frontier Province, signing of the Indian Constitution, Mahatma Gandhi addressing the Indian National Army soldiers, the Cripps' Mission, a series documenting the development of the Bhakra Dam and photographs from the front of the Sino-Indian War, etc.

== History in the making ==
Taking a leap with the Kulwant Roy collection, the Aditya Arya Archive released a book, History in the making – The visual archives of Kulwant Roy, in April 2010. The book has been published in hardback by HarperCollins Publishers India Ltd.

Aditya Arya and Indivar Kametkar worked together on the book for nearly three years, putting together text and images to form a compelling visual narrative. It is a visual documentary on the history of India from the 1930s to 1950s and some of Kulwant Roy's original captions and the imprint of his own rubber stamp on several pages. The forward has been written by India's Prime Minister, Dr. Manmohan Singh.

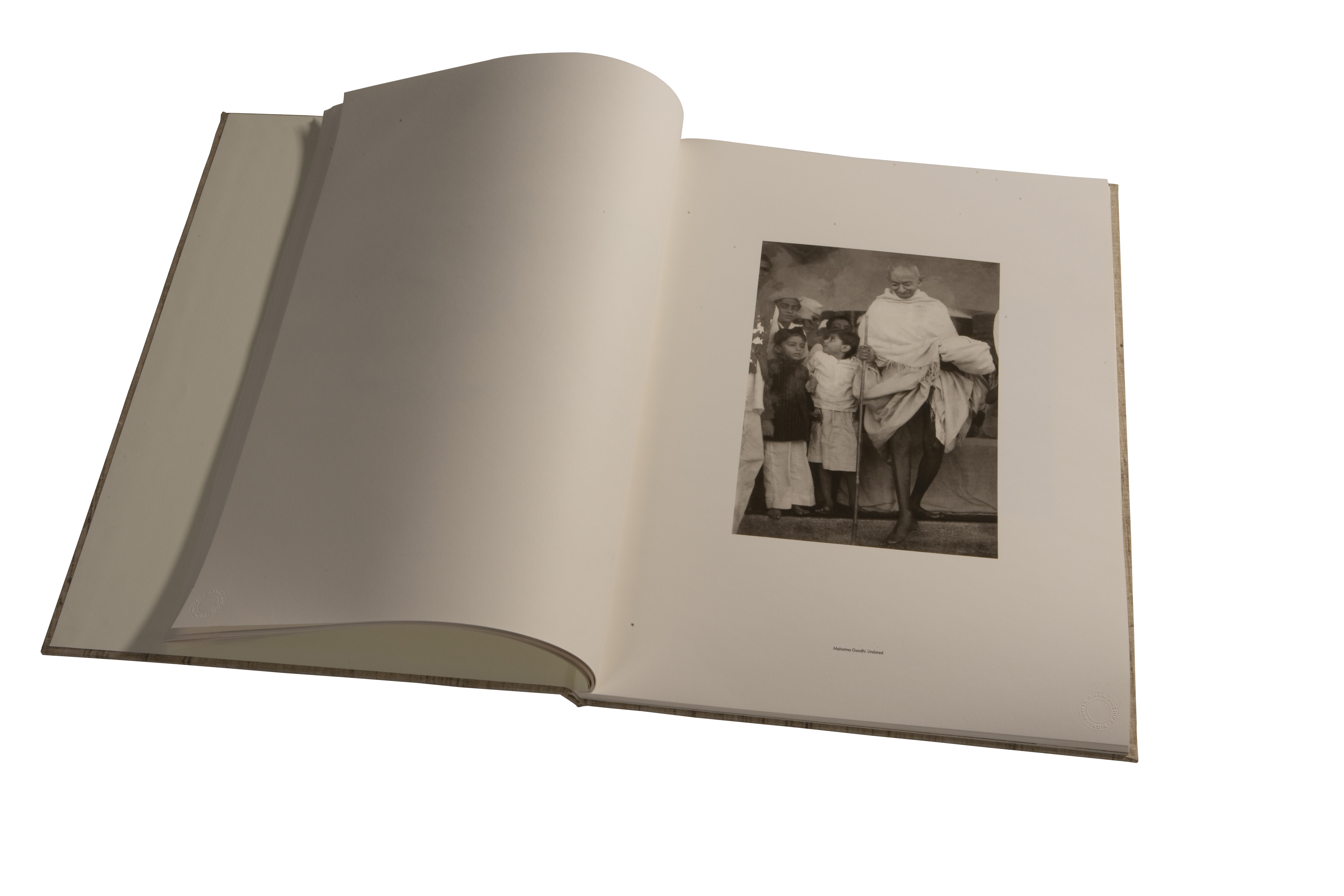
A collector's edition was launched titled 'Visual Archives of Kulwant Roy- Gandhi Collection by Aditya Arya Archive

== Book launch and exhibitions ==
- The first exhibition of Kulwant Roy's work took place at Delhi's Indira Gandhi National Centre for the Arts (IGNCA) in October 2008.
- The Great Divide: India and Pakistan, a book which contained some images from the Kulwant Roy collection, was launched at the India International Center, New Delhi in May 2009.
- An exhibition of photographs from History in the making – The visual archives of Kulwant Roy, was organized in collaboration with Indian Council for Cultural Relations and India Canada Association at three venues in Canada in June 2009: 5th Parallel Gallery, Riddell Center, University of Regina; George Bothwell Dunlop Art Gallery, Regina and Simon Fraser University, Vancouver.
- The Gandhi Memorial Center, Washington, D.C. held an exhibition of photographs from History in the making – The visual archives of Kulwant Roy, sponsored by the Indian Council for Cultural Relations and in cooperation with the Indian Embassy of India in October 2009.
- Soon after the book launch of History in the making – The visual archives of Kulwant Roy, The Piramal Art Gallery at Mumbai's National Center for Performing Arts hosted an exhibition of Roy's works in April 2010.
- Where Three Dreams Cross, 150 Years of Photography from India, Pakistan and Bangladesh, at the Whitechapel Gallery in London in April 2011, displayed some selected images from the Kulwant Roy collection.
- Book launch and exhibition of History in the making – The visual archives of Kulwant Roywas organized at Teen Murti, New Delhi in April 2010. Mrs. Gursharan Kaur, wife of India's Prime Minister, was invited as a special guest at the occasion.
- History in the making – The visual archives of Kulwant Roy was launched at Mayfair's Nehru Centre, London by the High Commissioner of India in May 2010
- Book launch and exhibition of History in the making – The visual archives of Kulwant Roytook place at Morlaix France in September 2010.
- An exhibition of Roy's works title 'The Visual Archives of Kulwant Roy' was held at the National Gallery of Modern Art (NGMA), New Delhi which was inaugurated on 14 November 2012.

== India Photo Archive Foundation ==
One of the outcomes of the process of restoration of the historical photographic collections is the India Photo Archive Foundation, which was established in the year 2009. The India Photo Archive Foundation is a Public Charitable Trust engaged in digitising, annotating, and preserving photographic archives.
