= Museo Camera =

Museum in Gurugram, India

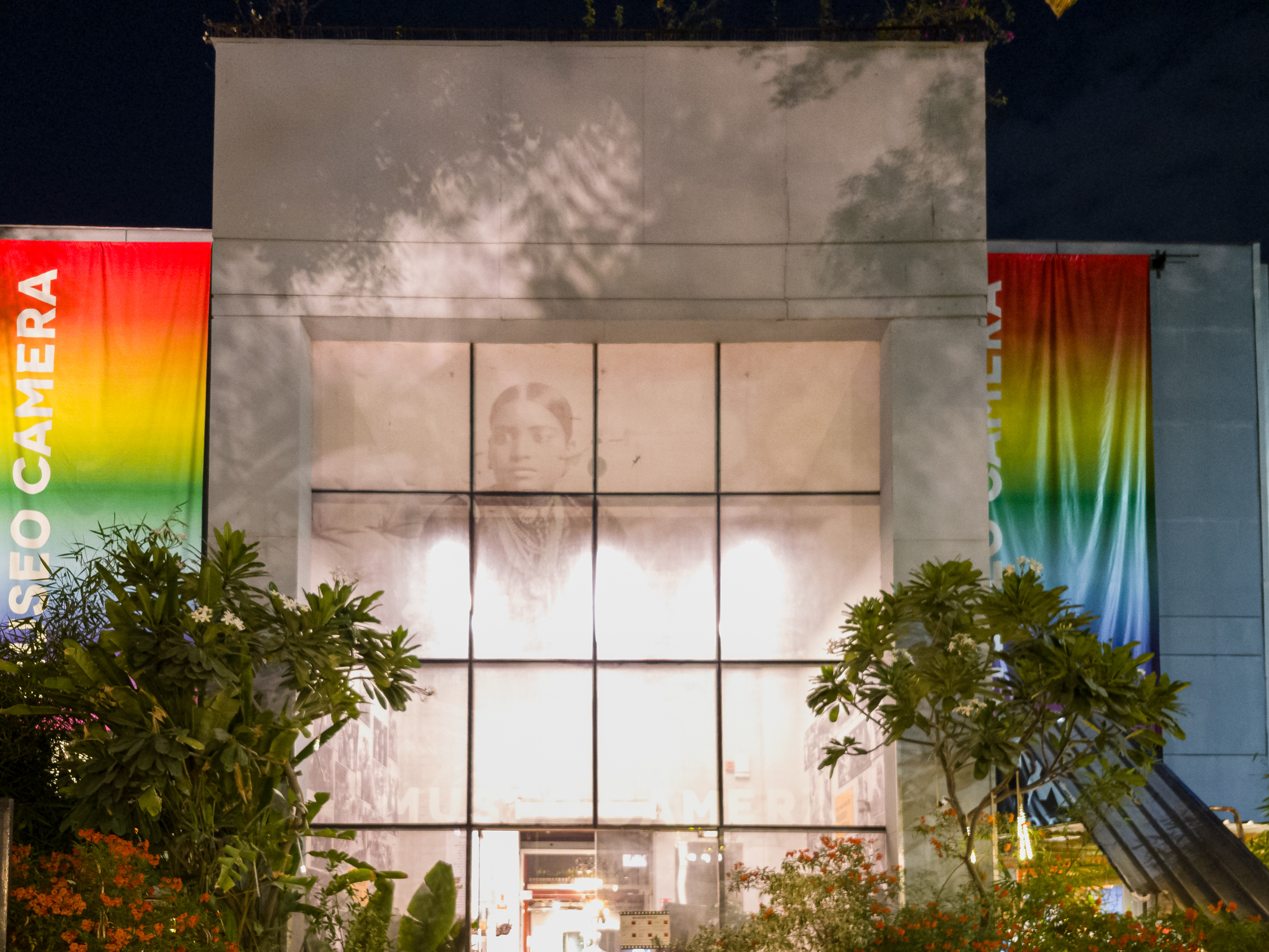
- Established: 28 August 2019
- Location: Gurugram, Haryana, India
- Coordinates: 28.46969°N 77.08042°E
- Type: Art museum
- Website: www.museocamera.org

The Museo Camera (also known as Museo Camera Centre for the Photographic Arts) is a museum in Gurugram, Haryana dedicated to the art and history of photography. Inaugurated on 28 August 2019, the museum is a joint public-private venture between Gurugram Municipal Corporation and India Photo Archive Foundation. It is conceived by noted historian, photographer, and activist, Aditya Arya. It is the largest non-profit public-funded centre for photographic arts in South Asia.

== History ==
The museum started in 2009 in a basement as a part of Arya's personal collections of equipment related to photography. In order to make the collection more accessible to the public, Arya collaborated with the Municipal Corporation of Gurugram in 2016. A museum spanning over 18,000 sq. ft. was inaugurated on 28 August 2019.

== Collections ==
The museum collection has over 3000 objects which include cameras, lenses, lighting equipment, photographic ephemera, etc. that traces the history and progress of photography in the world and the Indian subcontinent in particular. There are over 2500 antique cameras from more than 100 countries across the world. Prominent artifacts include the world's tiniest camera, while the oldest one in the collection dates back to the 1870s. There are also flash equipment, photographic films, lenses of various types, light meters, and enlargers. The photo archives consist of photographs of socio-political, cultural, and historical interests.

Recognised by the Indian Government's Ministry of Culture as a National Collection, the Kulwant Roy Collection is housed in this museum. It features rare and iconic images of India's freedom fighters and national heroes. It has been widely exhibited around the world by the Government of India in collaboration with ICCR. The other miscellaneous range of exhibits on display includes notable advertisements from the world of photography, materials related to camera companies, film roll makers, historic records of patents, etc. One of the most famous exhibits is the Century Graphic (Turn of the Century) which Aditya Arya explains was used to take portrait pictures in 1900s in the studio.

Antique cameras and photographic equipment on display

Interior view of the museum's photographic collection

Display cases containing cameras and related equipment

Exterior view of the museum

== Events and exhibitions ==
The museum regularly organises several events and exhibitions all throughout the year. Some of the important events it has conducted include a talk by Harsheen Jammu on The Essence of Colors, a performance by the music band Chaar Yaar on account of India's platinum jubilee celebrations of Independence Day, Mahmood Farooqui's Dastangoi, etc. Notable exhibitions include Partho Sen Gupta's Unpacked, H.E. Emmanuel Lenin's An Exhibition of Cyanotype Prints, Aparna Banerjee's Framing Flowers are significant examples. Tarab Khan's painting exhibition At the Gates of Talbosh, presented a way of escape from the real world into a new world of future possibilities.

== Services ==
The museum provides a host of services including specially curated workshops, museum tours and special events for children, research scholars, amateurs, etc. The India Photo Archive Foundation (IPAF) and the Digital Asset Management (DAM) provide conservation, archiving, and digital preservation services. It also provides archival printing facilities to preserve old, and priceless photographs. It also has film development and scanning services.

== See also ==
- List of Museums in Haryana
