= Photography in India =

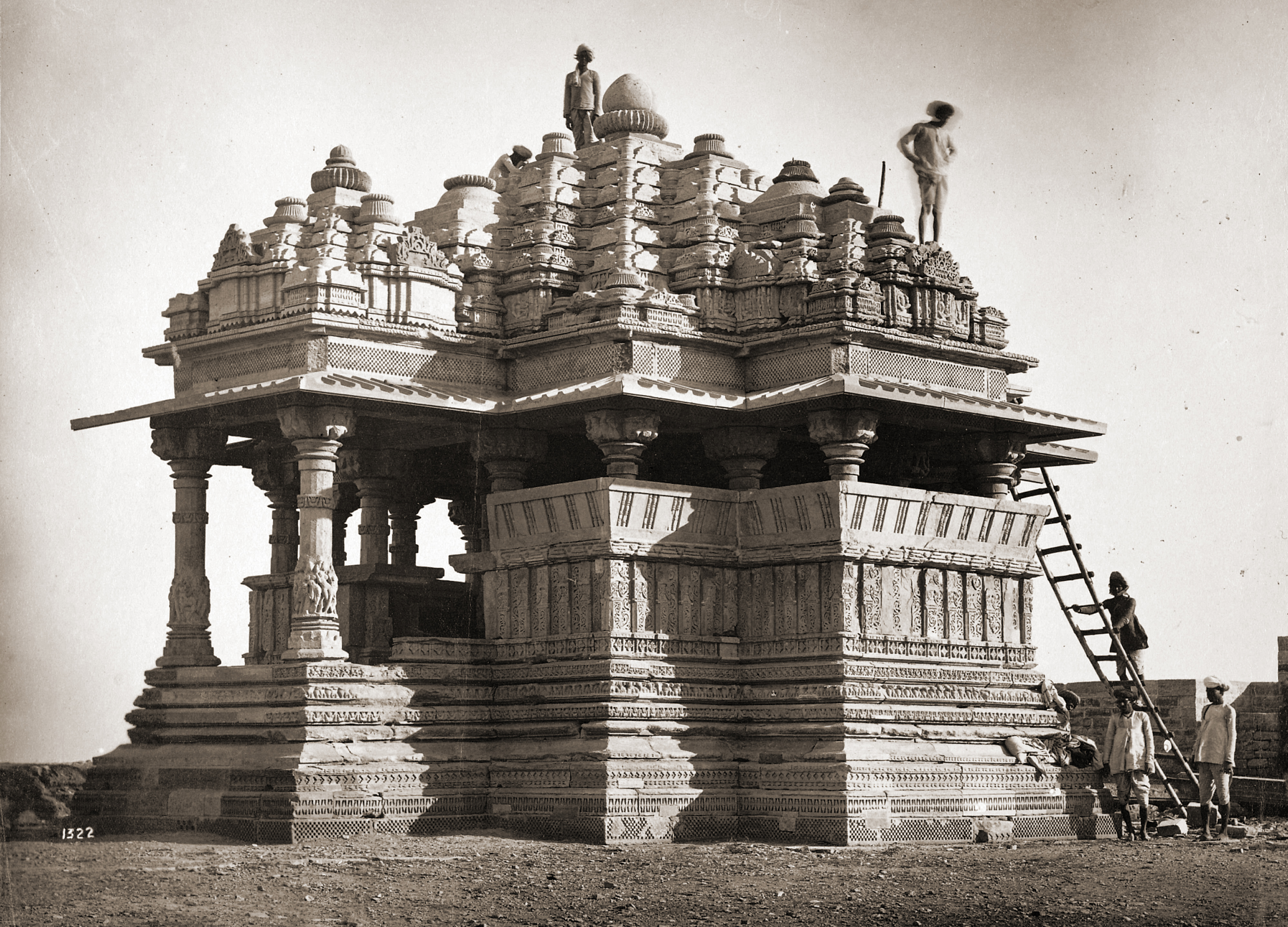
Sasbahu Temple photographed by Lala Deen Dayal in the 1880s.

Photography in India refers to both historical as well as to contemporary photographs taken in the geographic region of modern-day India.

Photography was introduced in India by the British in the early 19th century. The earliest photographers were patronized by the British government and the rulers of the princely states.

== Colonial period ==
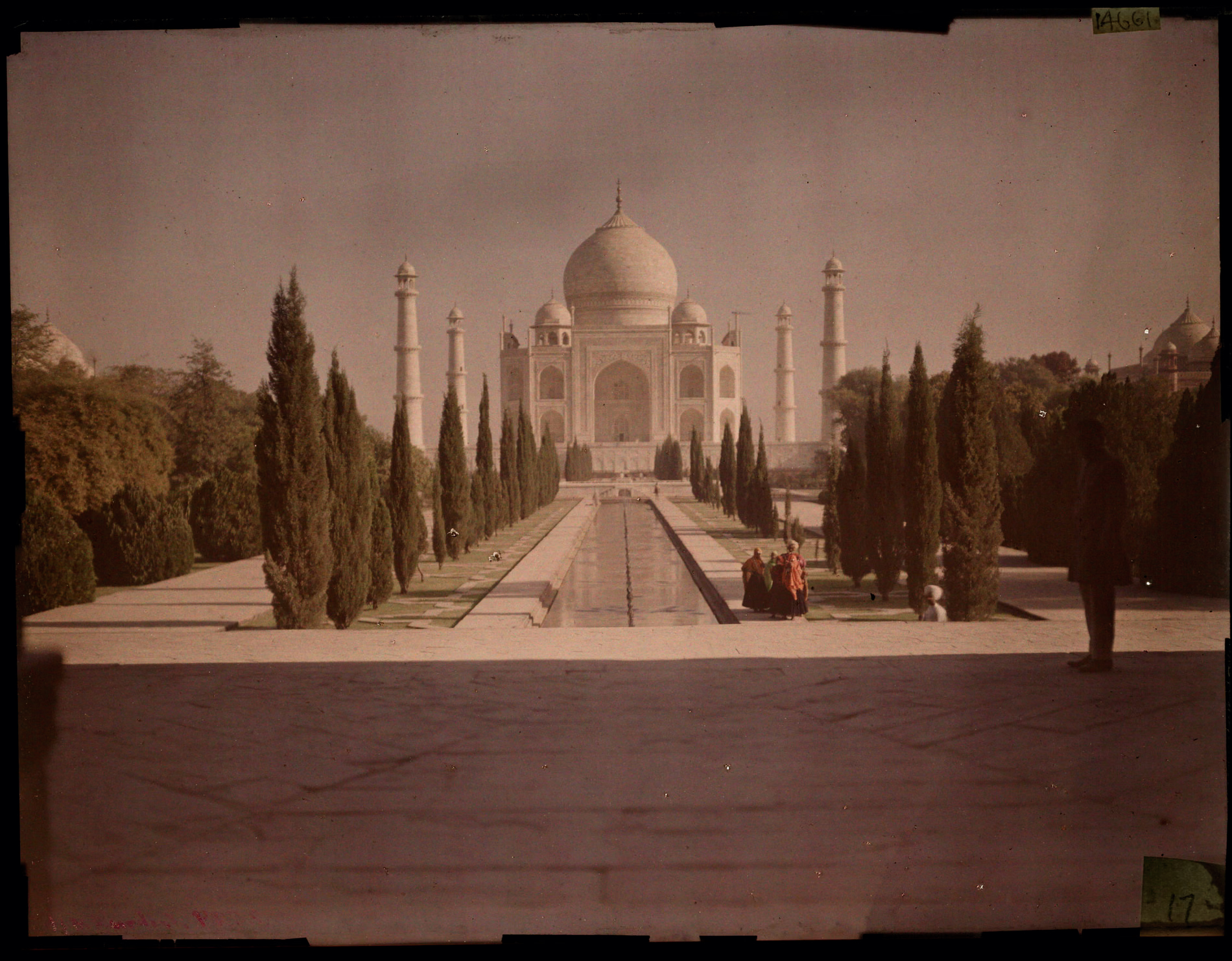
A 1914 color photograph of the Taj Mahal, taken by Helen Messinger Murdoch, published in a 1921 issue of National Geographic magazine

Photography was introduced in India by the British in the 1840s. The concept of photography spread to India at a fast pace after the invention, introduction, and publicization of the daguerreotype technology in 1839. By 1840, advertisements in Calcutta by Thacker, Spink, & Co. for imported cameras started appearing in a periodical titled Friends of India. The earliest known or surviving photographic capture in India dates to 1840 and is a lithograph based on a daguerreotype of the Sans Souci Theatre in Calcutta. By the later 1840s, the first known commercial photographic studio began its operation in Calcutta. This was followed by photographic societies sprouting up in the 1850s in Bombay (1854), Calcutta (1856), and Madras (1856). The purpose of these photographic societies was to promulgate photographic awareness and understanding by holding meetings and annual exhibitions.

Notable photographers such as Felice Beato and Samuel Bourne spent several years in India, photographing Indian people and architecture. Beato covered the Indian Rebellion of 1857 in various cities, and his work has been seen as a pioneering effort of war photography. Bourne set up Bourne & Shepherd in 1863 and produced thousands of images of the architecture and landscapes of India.

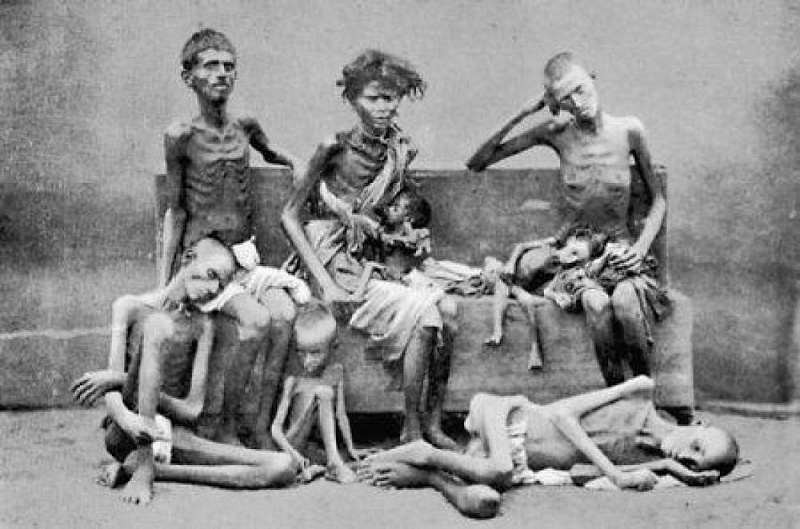
Willoughby Wallace Hooper, Inmates of a relief camp during the Madras famine, 1876-1878

Willoughby Wallace Hooper became known for his photographs of ethnic groups, military and domestic scenes from the 1860s onwards. Among other photographers, he contributed to the ethnographic survey The People of India (8 vols, 1868–75). Around 1878, Hooper had taken a series of arranged photographs showing emaciated bodies of men, women and children, who were among the millions of victims of the Madras Famine. Having been published in Britain under the title Secundarabad, and with captions such as "Deserving Objects of Gratuitous Relief", they were caricatured by the satirical magazine Punch, criticizing Hooper for not having given any help to the people he was about to depict. Further, his photographs of prisoners in British Burma facing execution by a firing squad raised concerns about the ethical behaviour of photographers during his lifetime.

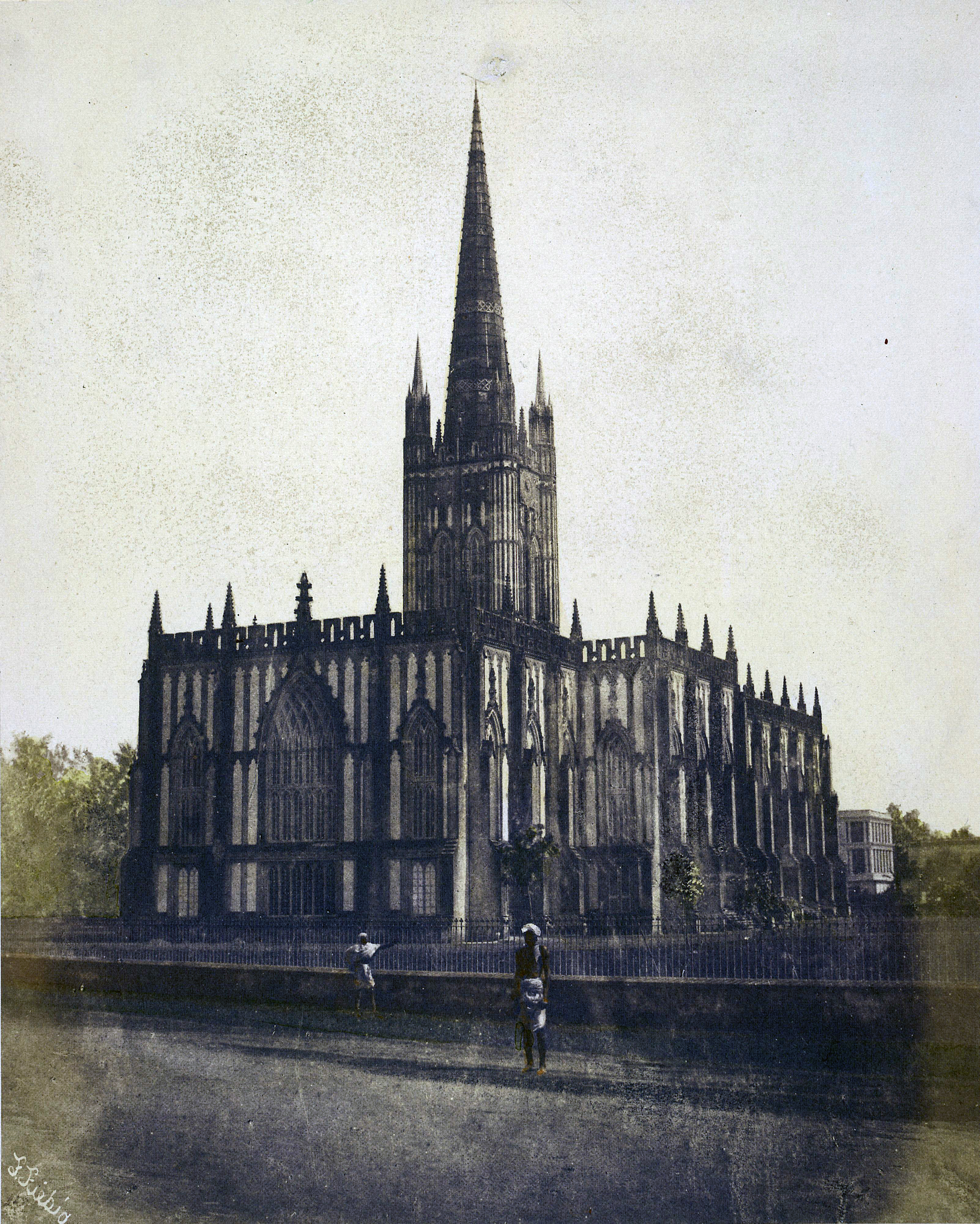
"St Paul's Cathedral, Calcutta," hand-coloured photographic print, by Frederick Fiebig. Dated 1851.

British authorities also supported efforts to photograph the various castes and tribes of India, as a way of categorising the various people of India, with racist and Orientalist undertones. The early photographers thus presented an exoticised view of India, intended to further the colonial agenda. Photographic publishing in India shifted from specialized, subscription-based albums, like The Indian Amateur's Photographic Album, to widely accessible educational magazines such as Indian Pictorial Education (launched in 1929), which became available through railway bookstalls.

The German-born photographer Frederick Fiebig became known for his photographs of buildings taken in the 1850s in Calcutta and Madras, as well as of indigenous neighbourhoods, mosques and temples. In 1856, the East India Company acquired some 500 of his photographs, which are now part of the Oriental and India Office collections at the British Library.

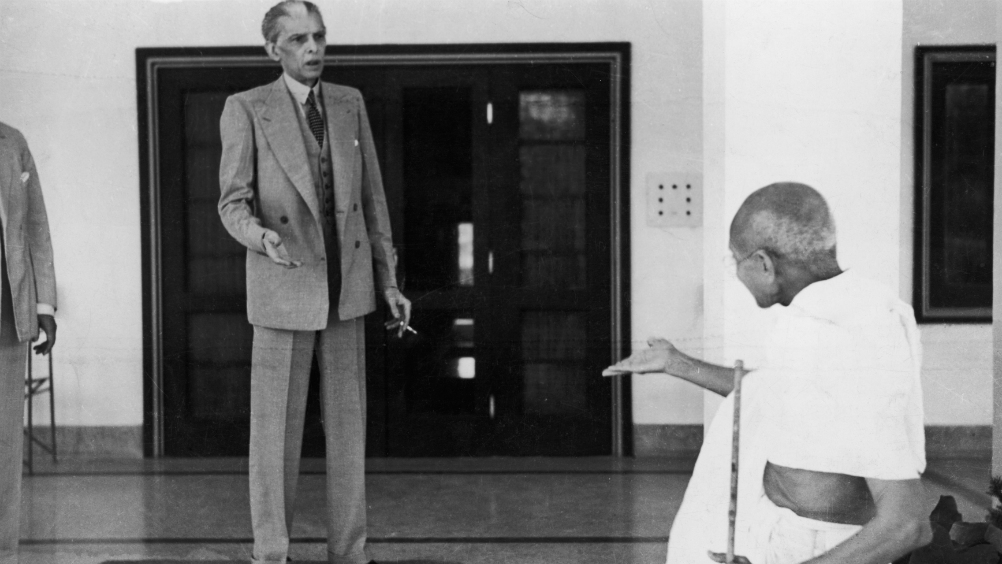
Mahatma Gandhi and Jinnah photographed by Kulwant Roy in 1944

Lala Deen Dayal was one of the few native Indian photographers of the 19th century, and the most prolific. In the 1880s, he was appointed the court photographer to the Nizam of Hyderabad. Other early Indian photographers such as Kulwant Roy and Kanu Gandhi documented people and events of the Indian Independence movement.

=== Punjab ===
Whilst the early history of photography in the Punjab is not known, the first photographs of Sikhs by a known photographer were taken by John McCosh, a British military surgeon employed by the East India Company, who had been stationed at Firozpur. He took photographs during the Second Anglo-Sikh War between 1848 and 1849, that are some of the earliest known examples of war photography in history. Using calotype technology, he captured images of individual Sikh persons and notable locations in Lahore. In 1848, McCosh snapped a portrait photograph of the then reigning 10-year-old child monarch, Maharaja Duleep Singh of the Sikh Empire, seated on a chair in a profile pose.

McCosh also created images of Bikram Singh Bedi, Maharani Jind Kaur, and Diwan Mulraj. One of the earliest photographers of the Golden Temple in Amritsar was a man by the name of Charles Waterloo Hutchinson. He recorded a photo of the site in 1856, around seven years after the fall of the Sikh Empire. Another early pioneer of photographing Sikhs was the Italian-British Felice Beato, who had been traversing the northern regions of the Indian subcontinent in the aftermath of the Indian Mutiny of 1857. People he portrayed in his photographic works included Akali-Nihangs, Sikh soldiers employed in the colonial military (such as in Hodson's Horse), as well as various views of the Golden Temple shrine and complex of Amritsar. Prominent photographers and studios who captured the Golden Temple and other Sikh sites in the 19th and early 20th centuries with their lens were Samuel Bourne (1863–65), John Edward Saché (1860s), William Baker (1864–66), James Craddock (1868–70), W. G. Stretton (1870), Baker & Burke (1872), Bourne & Shepherd (1880s–90s), A. Skeen (1900), Hannah P. Adams (1906), Herbert G. Ponting (1906), Underwood & Underwood (1908), Stereo Travel Co. (1908), and H. Templar (1910).

== Post-Independence ==
Homai Vyarawalla was one of the notable Indian photojournalists of the 20th century. In 2020, Dar Yasin, Mukhtar Khan and Channi Anand became the first Indian photographers to win the Pulitzer Prize for their coverage of the protests in Kashmir.

== Gallery ==
Photographs in Colonial India
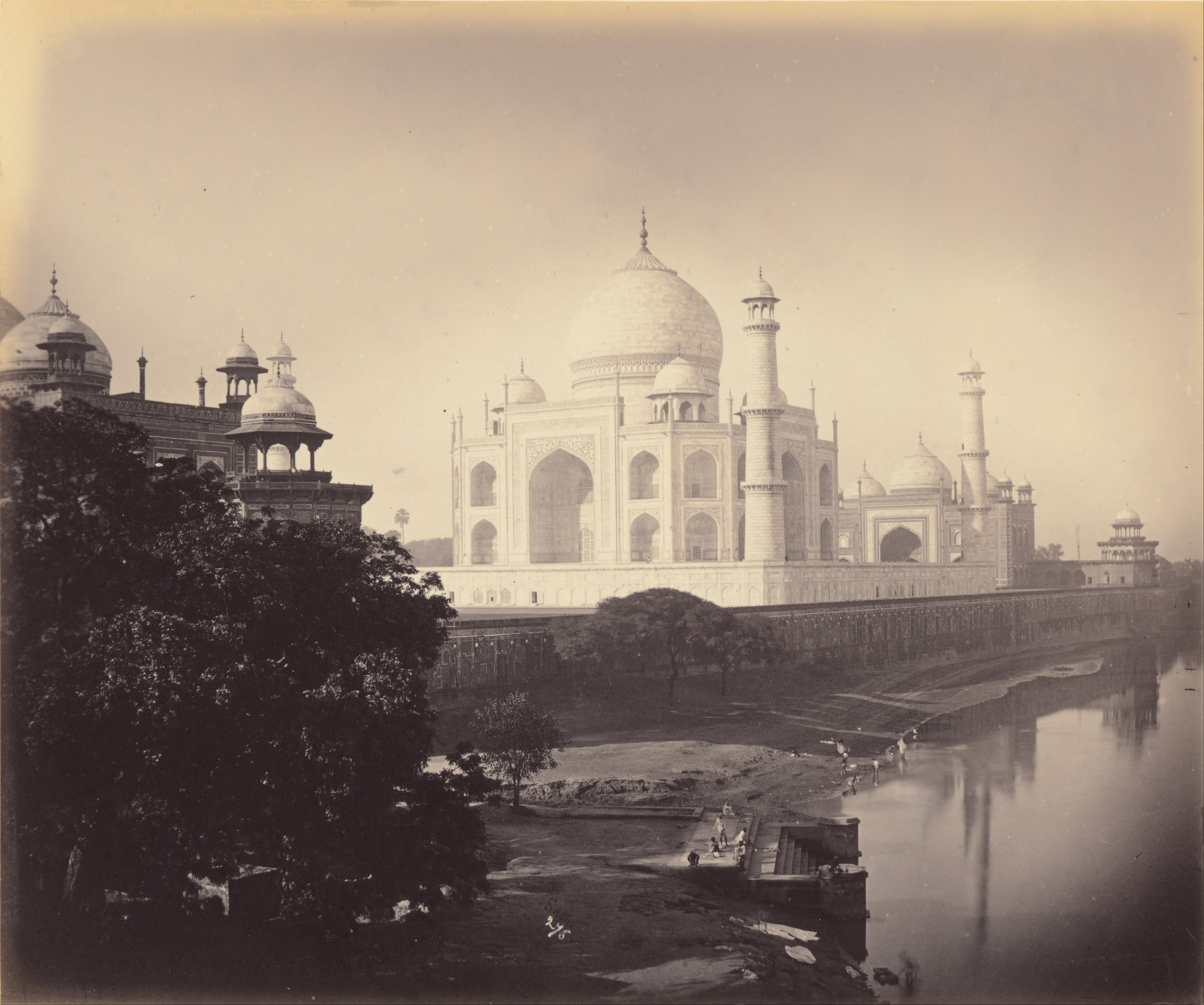
Taj Mahal in 1860 - 1880s by John Saché

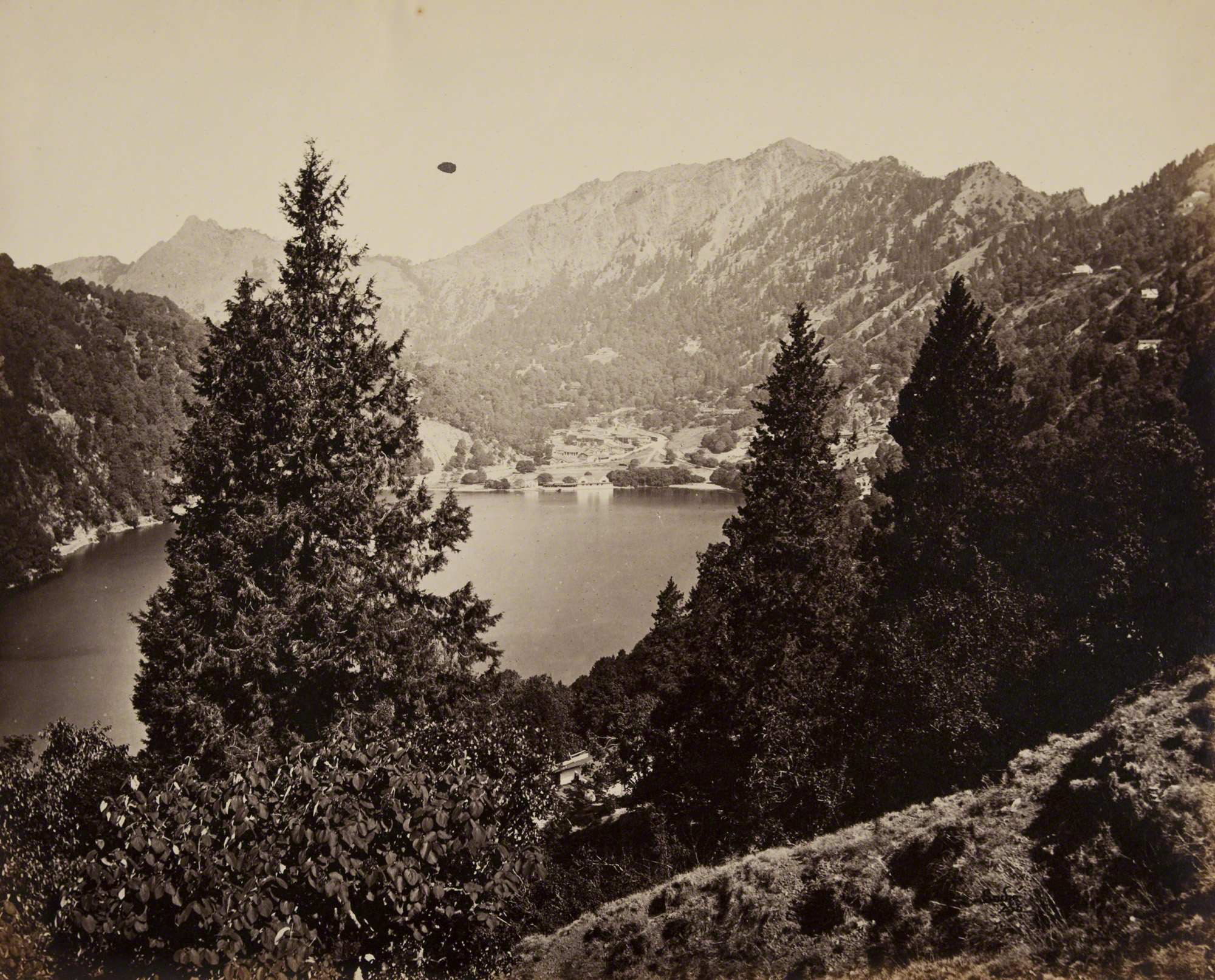
Nainital in late 19th century

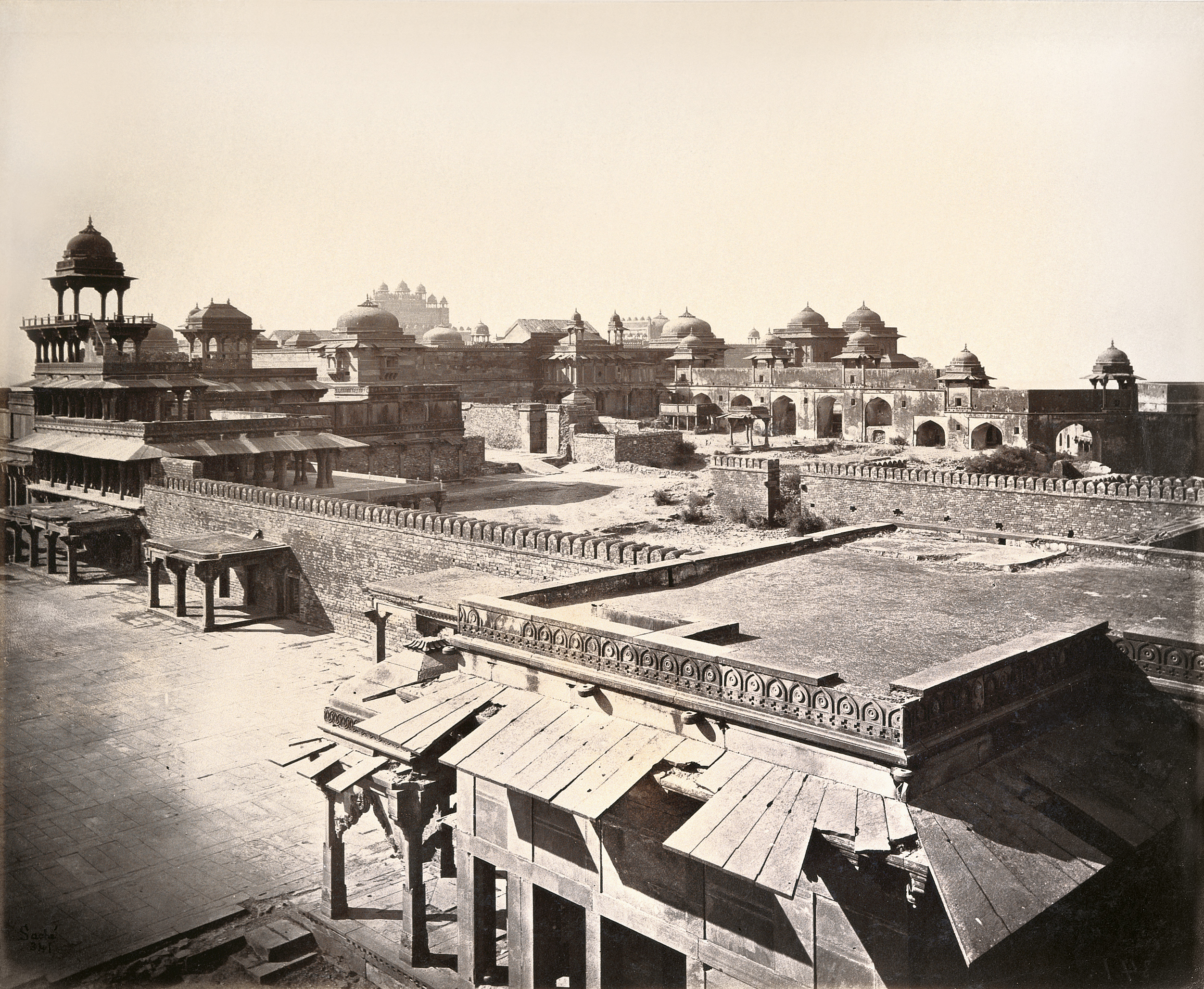
Jama Masjid in Agra, 1870

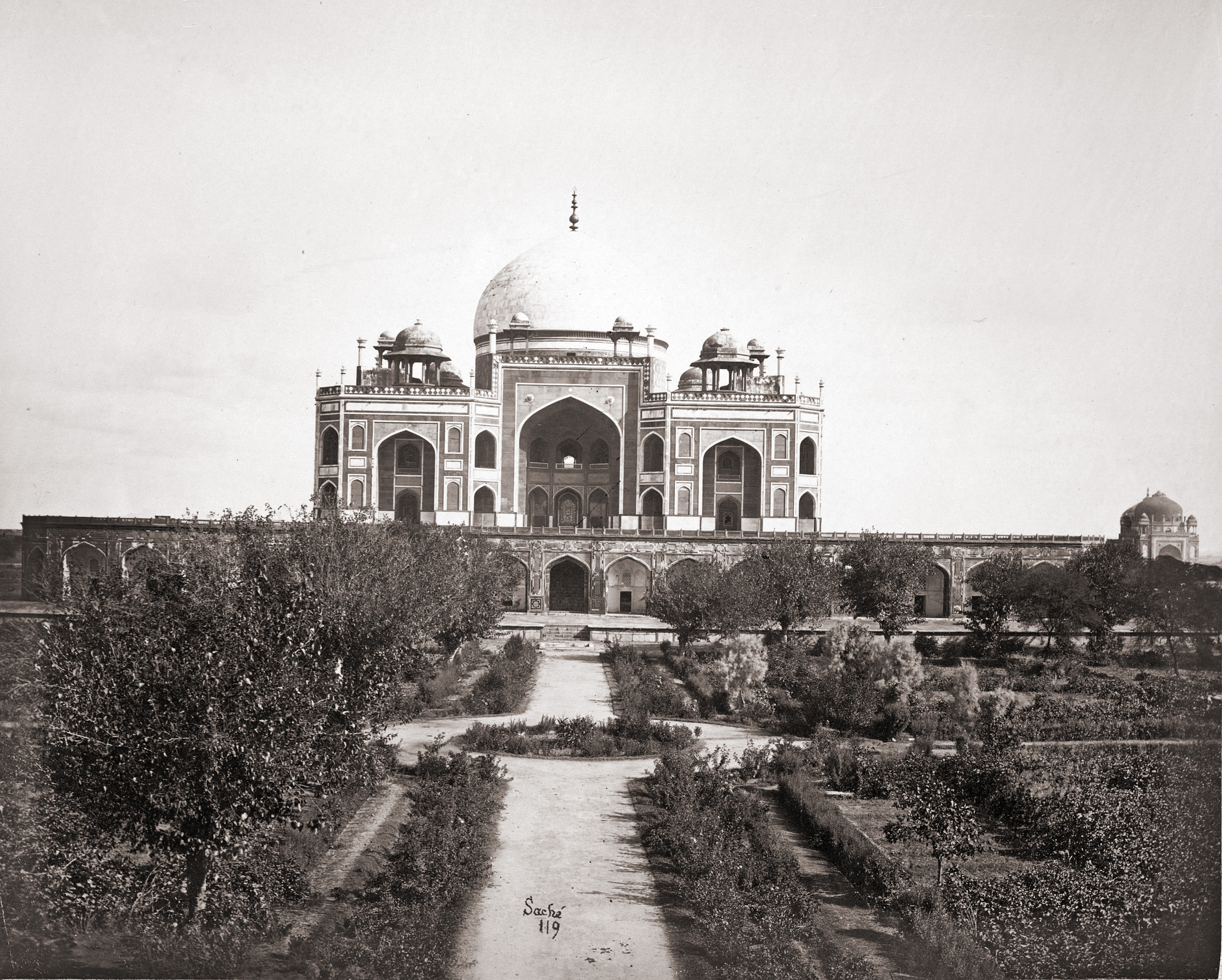
Humayun's tomb in 1860

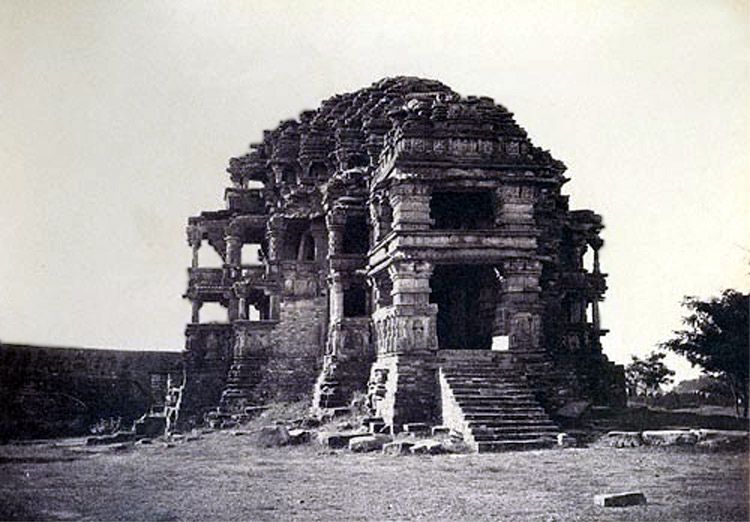
Sasbahu temple in Gwalior

== See also ==
- National Photography Awards
