= Great Eastern =

Great Eastern may refer to:

== Transport ==
- SS Great Eastern, a steamship built by Isambard Kingdom Brunel in 1858, the largest ship of its era
- Great Eastern Railway, a defunct English railway company formed in 1862
  - First Great Eastern, a defunct train operating company on the Great Eastern Main Line
  - Great Eastern Main Line, a British railway line
- The Great Eastern, a bridge laying tank of World War II

== Arts and entertainment ==
- The Great Eastern (radio show), that ran from 1994 to 1999 on CBC Radio One
- The Great Eastern (album), a 2000 album by the Scottish band The Delgados
- The Great Eastern (Rodman novel), a 2019 novel by Howard A. Rodman
- The Great Eastern (Embirikos novel), a 1990-1992 novel by Andreas Embirikos

== Other uses ==
- Great Eastern Hotel (disambiguation)
- Great Eastern Life, an insurance company in Singapore and Malaysia

== See also ==
- Great Easton (disambiguation)
- Grand Est (Great East), a region in France
