= Mohnivilla =

Mohni Village is located about 17 km from Surat and is very close to Chalthan.
