= Great Eastern Hotel =

Great Eastern Hotel may refer to:

- Great Eastern Hotel, Kolkata
- Great Eastern Hotel, London
- Great Eastern Hotel (novel), a 2025 historical novel by Ruchir Joshi
