= Raghubhai Morarji Nayak =

Indian educator (1907–2003)

- Born: 1907; Chalthan, Surat, Gujarat, India
- Died: 2003 (aged 95–96); India
- Occupations: Educationist; Social worker
- Years active: 1944–2003
- Known for: Sardar Patel Vidyalaya
- Spouse: Jashiben Nayak
- Awards: Padma Shri; National Teacher Award

Raghubhai Morarji Nayak (1907–2003) was an Indian educationist, social worker and the founder principal of Sardar Patel Vidyalaya. He was the co-founder of Saraswati Vidyamandal, which runs a number of educational institutions in the Indian state of Gujarat. Known to have been a student of Rabindranath Tagore, he also served as the chairman of Saraswati Kelavani Mandal, the holding trust managing a group of schools. The Government of India awarded him the fourth highest civilian honour of the Padma Shri, in 1976, for his contributions to education.

== Biography ==
Nayak was born in 1907 at Chalthan, a small town in Surat, Gujarat, he did his schooling at Shantiniketan from where he graduated in 1929. Moving to Maharashtra, he started his career as a teacher at Pupils' Own School, Pune in 1932 where he taught Indira Gandhi who would later become the Prime Minister of India, among other students. Taking a sabbatical from work, he went to Germany to pursue his doctoral studies where he was known to have come in contact with Subhash Chandra Bose, which delayed his return to India as the German authorities confiscated his passport. He returned to India in 1940 and four years later, he founded Saraswati Vidyamandal, in 1944, reportedly on borrowed money. In 1957, Hirubhai M. Patel, the then Finance Secretary of India, offered him the post of the founder principal of Sardar Patel Vidyalaya, which was being started by the Gujarat Education Society. While serving as the principal, he also chaired Saraswati Kelavani Mandal, another educational group. The Government of India awarded him the civilian honor of the Padma Shri in 1976. He was also a recipient of the National Teacher Award.

Nayak was married to Jashiben, who assisted him in several of his endeavors and is the incumbent principal of Saraswati Vidyamandal. He died in 2003, at the age of 96.

== See also ==
- Sardar Patel Vidyalaya
