= Boyd Alexander =

British Army officer, explorer and ornithologist (1873–1910)

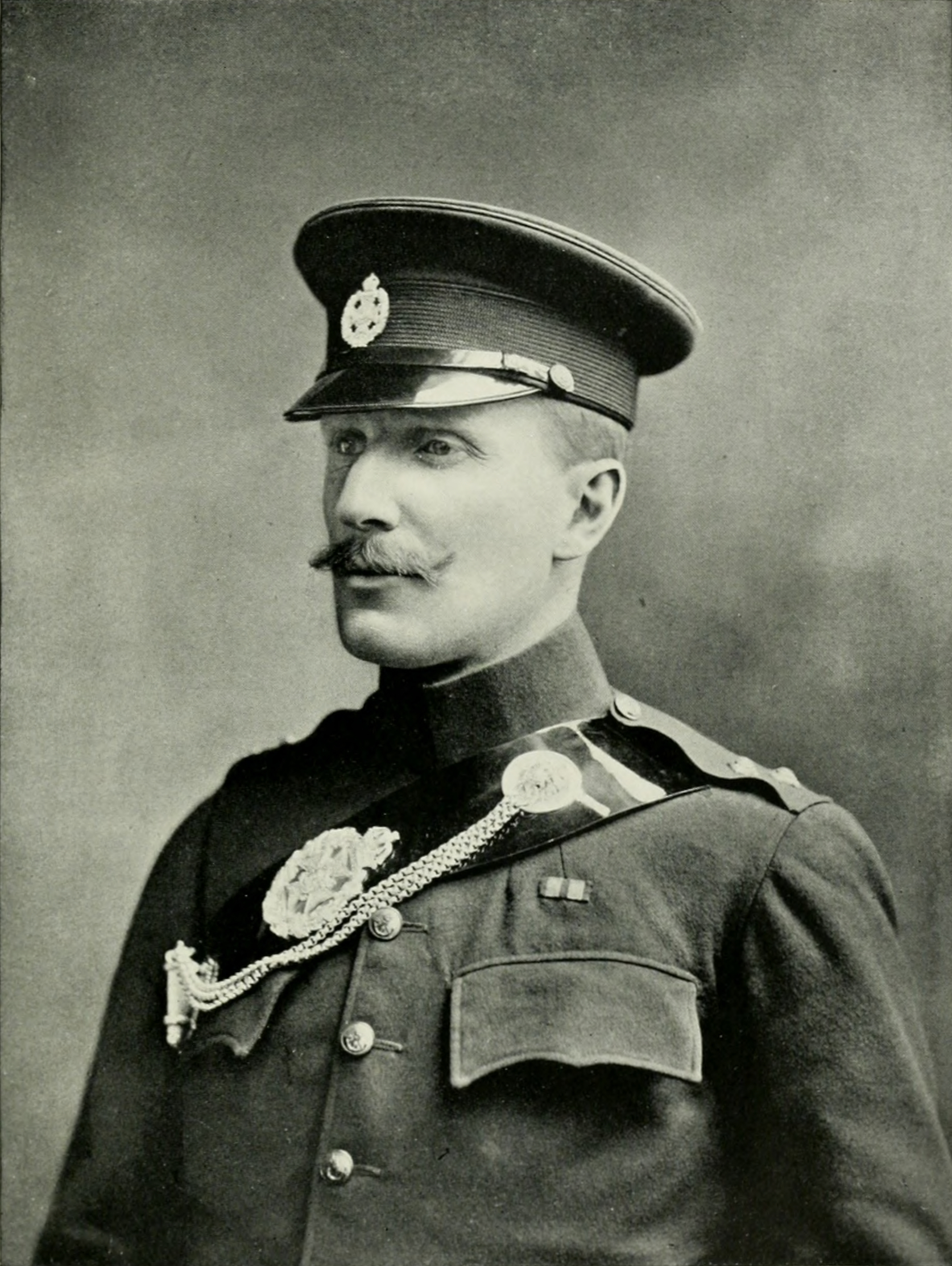
- Alexander in 1902
- Born: 16 January 1873; Cranbrook, Kent, England
- Died: 2 April 1910 (aged 37); Nyeri, Wadai (now Chad)
- Education: Radley College and RMA Sandhurst
- Occupation: Soldier
- Known for: Exploration and ornithology
- Scientific career
- Author abbrev. (zoology): Alexander, B. Alexander

Lieutenant Boyd Alexander (16 January 1873 – 2 April 1910) was an English officer in the British Army, as well as an explorer and ornithologist.

== Early life ==
Boyd was the oldest son (with a twin brother) of Lt Colonel Boyd Francis Alexander. On his mother's side he was the grandson of David Wilson, the founder of the Great Eastern Hotel in Calcutta. He was born at Swifts Park at Cranbrook in Kent and educated at Radley and Sandhurst.

Alexander was commissioned in a Militia battalion of the Rifle Brigade (Prince Consort's Own), and in October 1900 took up a commission in a regular battalion of that regiment. Promotion to lieutenant followed on 22 January 1902.

During 1902 he visited the Gold Coast Colony, where he made an ornithological survey of that colony, and in September that year he left for the Bonin Islands to investigate their avifauna.

== African expedition ==
Lieutenant Alexander was a member of an expedition which travelled across Africa from the Niger to the Nile, exploring the Chad Basin. Alexander was accompanied by his brother Claud, Captain G. B. Gosling and Portuguese collector José Lopes. In February 1904 they set off from the mouth of the Niger, travelling upriver to Lokoja. Claud died in October of enteric fever after making a survey of the Murchison Range. Boyd and Gosling explored the area around Lake Chad. Gosling died in June 1906 at Niangara of blackwater fever. Boyd then followed the Kibali River, reaching the Nile late in the year and returning to England in February 1907. Alexander's account From the Niger to the Nile was published later that year. In 1908 he was awarded the Founder's Medal of the Royal Geographical Society "for his three years' journey across Africa from the Niger to the Nile."

He described Willcocks's honeyguide on the basis of a specimen obtained on his 1901 expedition along the Volta river. His enthusiasm for Lake Chad was such that he and his twin brother Robert had a miniature replica of Lake Chad made alongside their family home, The Swifts, at Cranbrook.

Alexander and Lopes sailed back to Africa in 1909. They visited Claud's grave at Maifoni in Bornu and then continued to Wadai. Boyd was killed in a dispute with locals near Nyeri, 70 miles (110 km) north of Abéché, the capital of Wadai. His body was recovered by French soldiers and buried next to his brother in Maifoni. Shortly before he departed on the expedition he had become engaged to Olive MacLeod; she travelled to visit his remote grave.

== Legacy ==
At St Dunstan's Church, Cranbrook, there is an alabaster memorial to Boyd and Claud Alexander by William Robert Colton.

Alexander's medals are in the Royal Green Jackets (Rifles) Museum.

== See also ==
- Category:Taxa named by Boyd Alexander
