= Vibha Parthasarathy =

Vibha Parthasarathi (born 13 September 1940) is an Indian educationist. She served as the chairperson of the National Commission for Women, India from 1999 to 2002.

== Background ==
Vibha Parthasarathi was educated at Cambridge University and Boston University. She was Principal of New Delhi's Sardar Patel Vidyalaya.

She currently serves on the advisory board of Peepul India, an education non-profit working to transform India's public school system in partnership with the government.

== National Commission of Women ==
Vibha Parthasarathi was nominated by the NDA government as the Chairperson of the National Commission for Women in July 1999. Her term ended in 2002.
