= Shivkumar Joshi =

Shivkumar Joshi (16 November 1916 – 4 July 1988) was a Gujarati language author from India. He was also stage actor and director. Born in Ahmedabad and lived in Calcutta, he was involved in literary activities. He wrote large number of plays, novels and short stories.

== Life ==
Shivkumar was born on 16 November 1916 at Ahmedabad to Sanskrit scholar Girijashankar Joshi. He acted in plays at early age of seven or eight when he was introduced in Natmandal, a stage troupe of Jaishankar Sundari. He completed his primary and secondary education from Ahmedabad and passed matriculation in 1933. He completed BA in Sanskrit from Gujarat College, Ahmedabad in 1937. He participated in Indian independence movement during his college days and was imprisoned for short period. He ran garment shop in partnership in Ahmedabad and Mumbai from 1937 to 1958. He started his own garment shop in Calcutta in 1958 and started participating in social, cultural, literature and stage activities. He was photographer and painter also. He died on 4 July 1988. His son Ruchir Joshi is also an author. He has 3 children from his first wife :Lt Mrs Sunanda Joshi. 1st born: Lt Mr Pranav Joshi, 2nd Born: Mrs Vandana Bhatt & 3rd Born: Mr Shyamal Joshi.

== Works ==
=== Plays ===
He wrote, directed and also acted in plays. Pankh Vinana Pareva ane Bija Natako (1952) was his first collection of one-act plays. His other collections of one-act plays are Anant Sadhna (1955), Sonani Hansadi Roopani Hansadi (1959), Neelanchal (1962), Neerad Chhaya (1966) and Ganga Vahe Chhe Aapni (1977). His plays mostly depict a conflict of the characters associated with urban life. They are social and introvert. His Be Takhta was an experimental play and he wrote a number of radio plays.

Sumangala (1955) was his first full-length play. His other full-length plays are Andhara Ulecho (1955), Angarbhasma (1956), Sandhyadipika (1957), Durvankar (1957), Ghata Dhiri Dhiri Aai (1959), Ekne Takore (1960), Suvarnarekha (1961), Shataranj (1962), Kritivaas (1965), Saaputara(1966), Sandhikaal (1967), Beejal (1969), Ajramar (1970), Kahat Kabira (1971), Kaka Sagarika (1973), Banshayya, Nakula and Triparna (1973), Lakshmanrekha, Neel Aakash, Leeli Dhara and Dwiparna (1976), Amar-Amar Mar (1982), Mashankarni Aisi Taisi (1982). He adapted Sharat Chandra Chattopadhyay's Biraj Bou and Devdas into plays.

=== Novels ===
He had written more than twenty five novels. His novels are derived from present times or sociopolitical incidents of recent past in which he intervened love stories. Kanchukibandh (1954) was his first novel. Aabh Ruve Eni Navalakhdhare (1964) is a long novel while Kamal Kanan Colony is a novella. His other novels are Anang Raag (1958), Shravani (1961) S. S. Roopnarayan (1966), Diyo Abhayna Daan (1967), Sonal Chhay (1967), Kef Kasumbal (1967), Rajat Rekh (1967), Ek Kan Re Apo (1968), Nathi Hu Narayani (1969), Ayananshu (1970), Asim Padchhaya (1971), Lachhman Ur Maila (1972), Vasantnu E Van (1973), Chirag (1975), Marichika (1975), Popat Amba Keri Daal (1976), Aa Avadhpuri! Aa Ram!! (1978), Udi Udi Jaav Pareva (1979), Priya Ramya Vibhavari (1980), Ganga Bahai, Nahi Rain (1981), Kalhansi (1983) and Kesude Kaman Gholya (1984).

=== Short stories ===
He wrote large number of short stories. His short story collections include Rajanigandha (1955), Trishul (1957), Rahasyanagari (1959), Raat Andhari (1962), Abhisar (1965), Kanakkatoro (1969) Komal Gandhar (1970), Kajal Kotadi (1973), Navpad (1976), Chhalchaal (1977), Shanti Paravar (1978) and Sakal Tirath (1980).

=== Other works ===
Jovi'ti Kotaro ne.... Jovi'ti Kandara and Pagala Padi Gaya Chhe (1982) are his travelogues. His experience with stage and memoir of theatre is written in Maarag Aa Pan Chhe Shoorano (1980). He translated four works from Bengali into Gujarati which include Rabindranath Tagore's Jogajog, Bibhutibhushan Bandyopadhyay's Adarsha Hindu Hotel, Gajendra Kumar Mitra's Kalakatar Kachhei as Kalkattani Saav Samipe and Vijay Bhattacharya's Navu Dhaan.

== Awards ==
He received Kumar Chandrak in 1952, Narmad Suvarna Chandrak in 1959 and Ranjitram Suvarna Chandrak in 1970. He was also awarded former Sangeet Natak Akademi Award for Plays for Suvarnarekha.

== See also ==
- List of Gujarati-language writers
