= Spence's Hotel =

Hotel in Kolkata, India

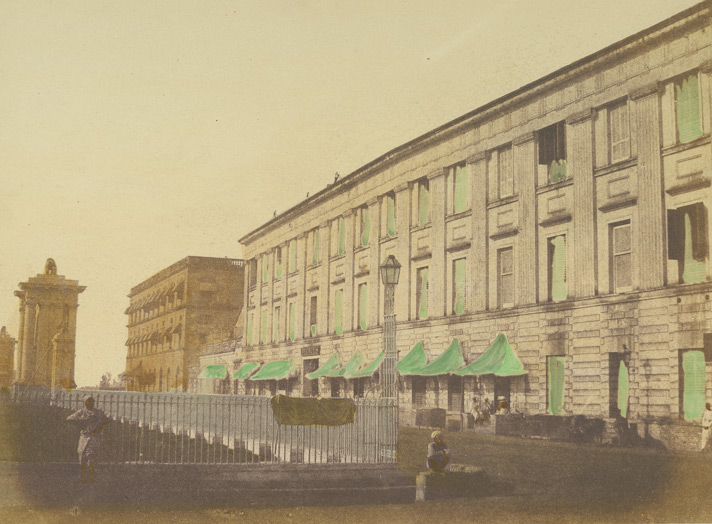
Spence's Hotel as photographed by Frederick Fiebig in 1851

Spence's Hotel was a hotel established in Kolkata in 1830. It was near the Government House. It no longer exists.

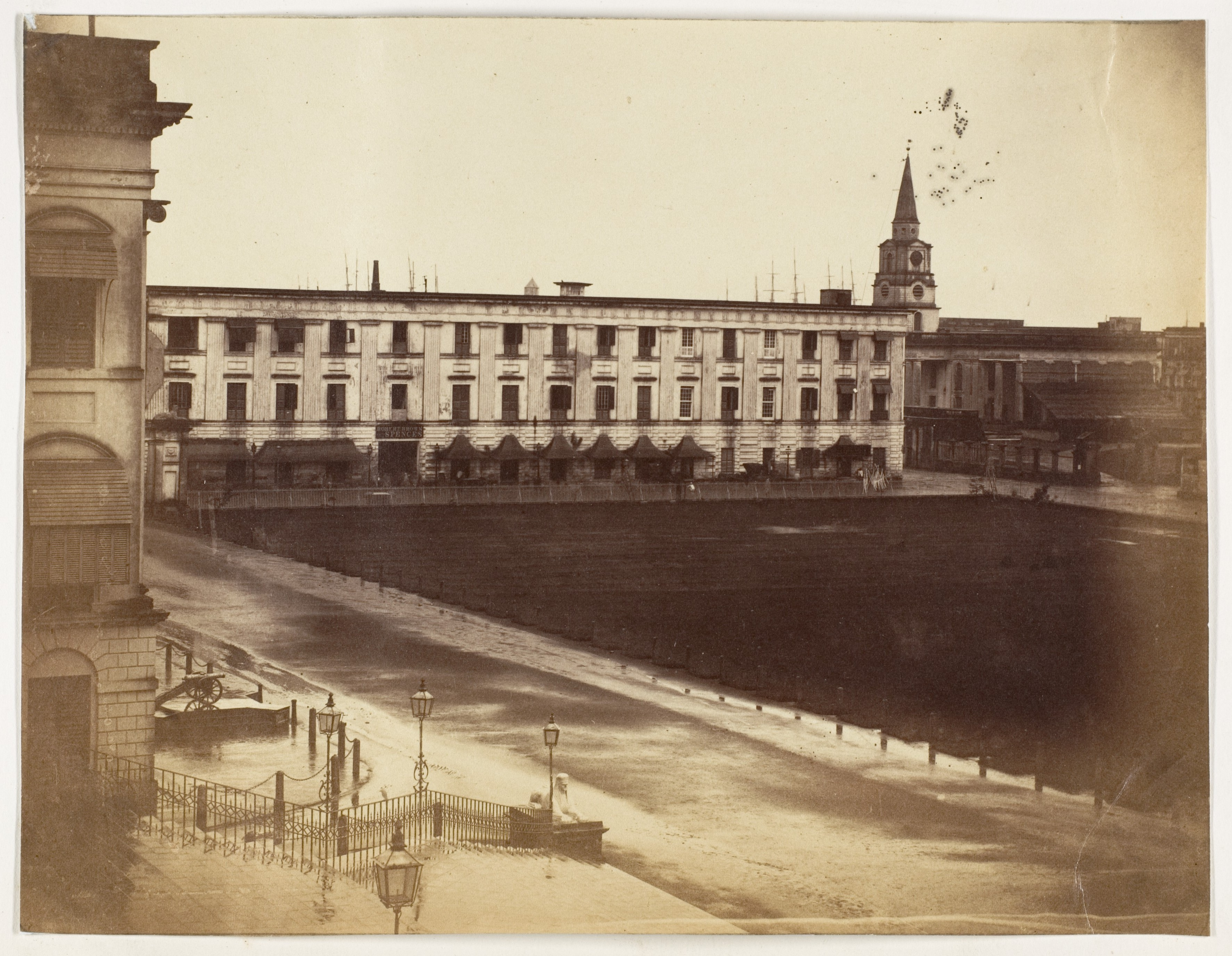
Spence's Hotel near St. John's Church

Various sources describe Spence's Hotel as either the first hotel in Asia, or in India, or in Kolkata.

The hotel is mentioned in Jules Verne's The Steam House as a place where the characters stay during a visit to Kolkata. It was the inspiration for the hotel described in the Sankar's 1962 novel Chowringhee.

On 16 January 1861 Duleep Singh met his mother Jind Kaur at the hotel. They had been separated in 1849 after the Treaty of Lahore when he was 10 years old and they reunited when he was age 22. From here, Singh brought his mother back with him to live in England. Because of political tension the British government choose Spence's Hotel as a neutral place where there was unlikely to be conflict.
