= Vineeta Rai =

Vineeta Rai is a former Indian Administrative Service officer and Revenue Secretary in the Government of India. Rai was voted one of The 25 Most Powerful women in Business in India in 2020.

== Early life ==
Rai completed her schooling at Sardar Patel Vidyalaya in New Delhi and subsequently studied history at Miranda House, and Brandeis University on a Wien International Scholarship. And also has two grandchildren Ellora and Rosie Rai-Walls.

== Career ==
An officer of the 1968 IAS batch of the Union Territories cadre, Rai is the first woman to hold the post of Revenue Secretary in the Ministry of Finance. She was appointed in June 2003 and held the post till September 2004.

Previously, Rai has held posts in the Ministry of Urban Development, Ministry of Health & Family Welfare and Ministry of Home Affairs in the Union Government.

She also worked in various state administrations and public sector undertakings.
