= Great Eastern Hotel (novel) =

2025 novel by Ruchir Joshi

- Author: Ruchir Joshi
- Language: English
- Genre: Historical fiction
- Set in: Calcutta, 1940s
- Publisher: Fourth Estate (HarperCollins India)
- Publication date: February 2025
- Publication place: India
- Media type: Print
- Pages: c. 920
- ISBN: 9789365695656
- Preceded by: The Last Jet-Engine Laugh

Great Eastern Hotel is a 2025 historical novel by the Indian writer and filmmaker Ruchir Joshi. It was published by Fourth Estate, the HarperCollins India imprint, in February 2025, and is Joshi's second novel after The Last Jet-Engine Laugh (2001). Set mainly in Calcutta during the 1940s and narrated from the perspective of the 1970s, the book runs to about 920 pages. It won the Crossword Book Award for Fiction in 2025.

== Background ==
Great Eastern Hotel is Joshi's second novel and was written over a period of about twenty years. Joshi, who was born in Calcutta, is also a documentary filmmaker and has worked as a newspaper columnist. The novel takes its title from the Great Eastern Hotel, a colonial-era hotel in Calcutta that was once known as the Jewel of the East and that later reopened as The LaLiT Great Eastern.

== Synopsis ==
The novel is framed as the work of Saki, in full Robi Nagasaki Jones-Majumdar, a scholar of architecture who sets out to compile a catalogue of the paintings of Kedar Lahiri, an artist from a zamindar family. Through Saki's research the book reconstructs Lahiri's life together with those of other characters in 1940s Calcutta, among them Nirupama Majumdar, a history student and worker for the Communist Party of India; Imogen, a young Englishwoman whose father is a colonial official; and Gopal, a pickpocket who becomes involved in the black market in rice. The narrative opens in August 1941, on the day of Rabindranath Tagore's death, and moves through the Bengal famine of 1943, the Quit India Movement, the Tebhaga movement and the later Naxalite period. The hotel recurs as a place where the characters meet and as a figure for the city itself.

== Reception ==
Reviewers described the novel as large in scale and non-linear in form. Writing in the Asian Review of Books, Soni Wadhwa called it a work of "gargantuan proportions" and compared it to Vikram Chandra's Sacred Games in scale and to Amitav Ghosh's The Shadow Lines in its treatment of memory and Calcutta's history.

A reviewer for Outlook noted that the book had taken about twenty years to write and found it steeped in history while still reading as modern, pointing to Joshi's use of humour. In a separate review, Outlook described the novel as a maximalist account of Kolkata built from fragments rather than a single linear plot. The book was also reviewed in India Today.

== Awards ==
Great Eastern Hotel won the Jury Award for Fiction at the 2025 Crossword Book Awards, which were announced on 3 December 2025 in Mumbai.
