= Great Easton =

Great Easton may refer to two places in England:

- Great Easton, Essex
- Great Easton, Leicestershire

== See also ==
- Great Eastern (disambiguation)
