= Ruchir Joshi =

Indian writer and filmmaker

- Born: 1960 (age 65–66); Calcutta (now Kolkata), West Bengal, India
- Occupation: Writer
- Writing career
- Genre: Historical fiction
- Notable work: The Last Jet Engine Laugh

Ruchir Joshi is an Indian writer, a filmmaker and a columnist for The Telegraph, India Today as well as other publications. He is best known for his debut novel titled The Last Jet-Engine Laugh (2001) and Great Eastern Hotel (2025), for which he won the Crossword Book Award for Fiction. He is also the editor of India's first anthology of contemporary erotica Electric Feather: The Tranquebar Book of Erotic Stories, published by Tranquebar Press/Westland.

== Life ==
Ruchir Joshi is the son of writer and dramatist Shivkumar Joshi. Born in 1960, he was brought up in Kolkata. He was educated at Mayo College in Ajmer, Rajasthan. He went to the United States of America in 1979, to study in an undergraduate college in Vermont. He moved to New Delhi in 1997 and remained there until 2007. Since then he has been shuttling between London and Delhi.

== Work ==
Apart from writing regular columns in newspapers and magazines, Joshi made a film on Bauls in 1992. It is called Egaro Mile (Eleven Miles). Early in his life, when he was just out of school, he decided to take up acting and performed in an English play called You're a Good Man, Charlie Brown directed by Zarin Chaudhuri. He wrote a piece called Tracing Puppa which was published in Granta 109 in a series of recollections regarding fathers.

== Bibliography ==
- The Last Jet Engine Laugh (2001)
- Electric Feather: The Tranquebar Book of Erotic Stories (editor) (2009)
- Poriborton: An Election Diary (2011)
- Great Eastern Hotel (2025)

== See also ==
- Jaipur Literature Festival
