= David Wilson (hotelier) =

British hotelier (1808-1880)

David Wilson (1808–1880) worked as a confectioner in Calcutta and on 18 November 1840 he opened the Auckland Hotel at 1-3 Old Court House Road in Calcutta. The hotel was also known as Wilson's Hotel and changed its name to the Great Eastern Hotel. It became the most famous hotel in India and is still functioning today as the Great Eastern Kolkata and is part of the Bharat Hotels Group.

David Wilson came from Herefordshire and started a bakery at No. 1 Old Court House Street. The bakery was successful as it served the need of the Britishers from the East India Company who missed their breads and muffins in India. He subsequently bought the No. 2 and then No. 3 in Old Court House Road in 1840 to convert it into a hotel, which he had named after George Eden, the first Earl of Auckland.

== Early and personal life ==
Wilson was born in Brilley, Herefordshire in 1808. He married Mary Mandy (née Rose) in Calcutta in 1838. One of their grandchildren was Lieut Boyd Alexander the famous African explorer. David's sister Anne was in Calcutta and married one of David's friends, also a confectioner, Frederick William Browne in 1840 in Calcutta. Frederick died on 5 October 1864 on board the steamer Persia when it was lost at Sandheads in the great cyclone of 1864.

David moved back to England in the 1860s but continued to manage the hotel. Over the ensuing years the hotel moved from strength to strength. In 1863 it became the first hotel in India to be fully electrified. Over the years famous guests have included Samuel Clemens (Mark Twain), Nikita Khruskhev and Queen Elizabeth II.

When David died in 1880 his net worth was over £60,000.
