= Frederick Fiebig =

19th-century German photographer

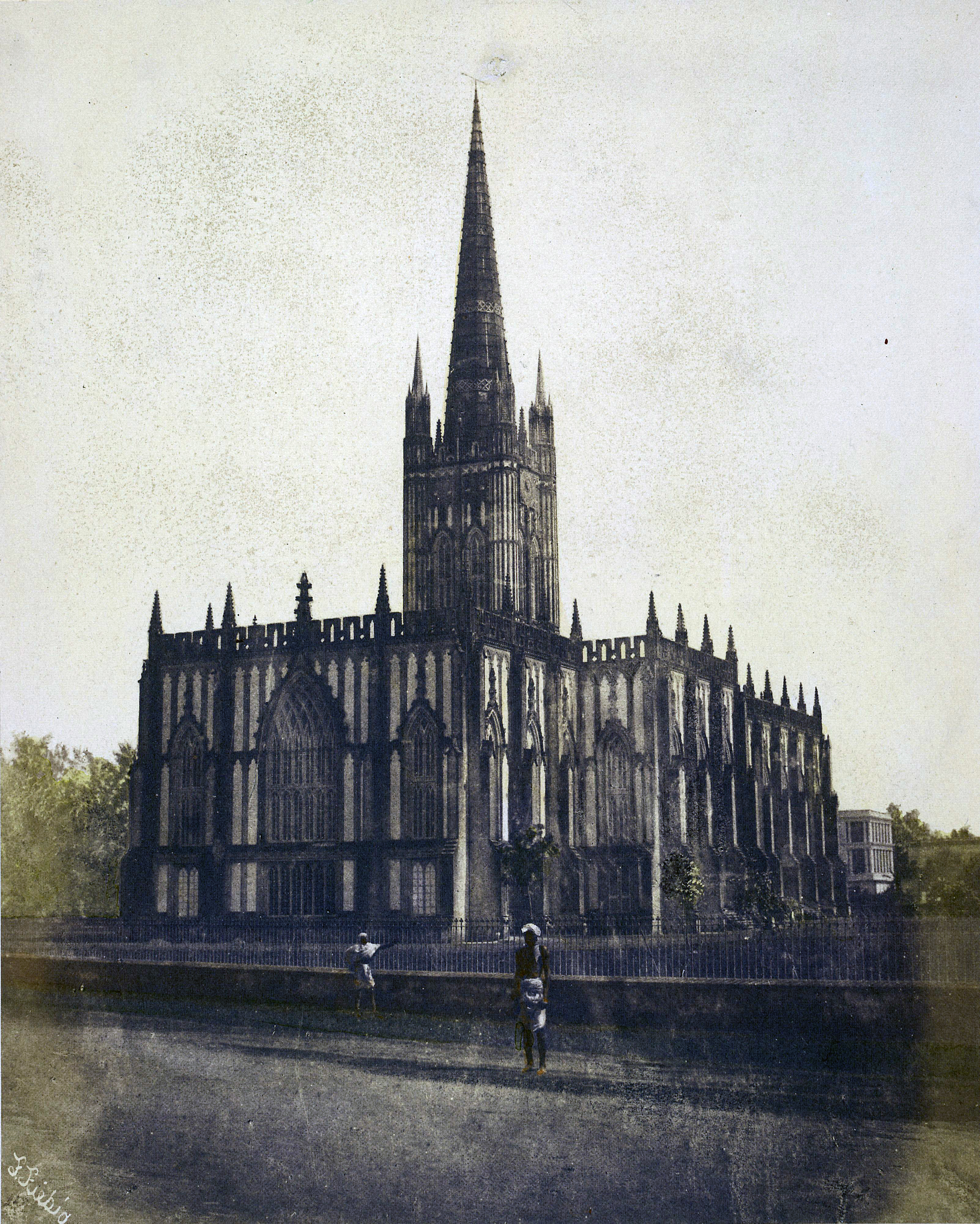
"St Paul's Cathedral, Calcutta," hand-coloured photographic print, by Frederick Fiebig. Dated 1851.

Frederick Fiebig was a German-born photographer, best known for his photographs of 19th-century British India, Ceylon, Mauritius, and Cape Town taken in the 1850s.

== History ==
There is very little information available about Frederick Fiebig. He was of German origin and became a lithographer in Calcutta in the 1840s. With the advent of photography in British India, Fiebig began producing hand-coloured prints of photographs captured using the calotype process. His images of Calcutta and Madras are some of the earliest views of these cities. Fiebig also travelled to Madras, Ceylon, Mauritius, and Cape Town in South Africa, meticulously cataloguing the monuments and people around him. In doing so, he did not limit himself to views of British buildings, but also photographed scenes of other counties' colonial settlements, as well as indigenous neighbourhoods, mosques and temples.

Only one contemporary source exists about his work, referring to his stay in Madras in early 1852 (‘Photography in Madras,’ Illustrated Indian Journal of Arts, Madras, part 4, February 1852, p. 32) According to this article, he also took photographs of Singapore, Burma, and China, but no examples of such images have been found.

The earliest surviving photographs of 19th-century Ceylon are considered those taken by Fiebig. Following a trip to southern India in 1852, he took photos of major cities and scenery on the island. His hand-coloured salted paper prints suggest that he photographed in Galle (then the principal port), Colombo and Kandy. His views of architectural monuments, landscapes, coffee estates and portraits of 'native types' have become common themes for subsequent generations of commercial photographers on the island.

In 1856, the East India Company acquired some 500 of his photographs, which are now part of the Oriental and India Office collections at the British Library.

== Reception ==
Among other exhibits, Fiebig's photograph of a Juggernaut procession float in Madras was shown in the 2004/2005 exhibition In the Realm of Gods and Kings: Arts of India, Selections from the Polsky Collections and The Metropolitan Museum of Art. The MET museum also owns a photograph of the Gunpowder Agent's Bungalow at Ichapore, India, taken by Fiebig in 1858. Further, lithographs and photographs from his work have been sold by auction houses such as Bonhams and Christie's.

== Gallery ==
Hand-coloured photographs by Frederick Fiebig, 1851
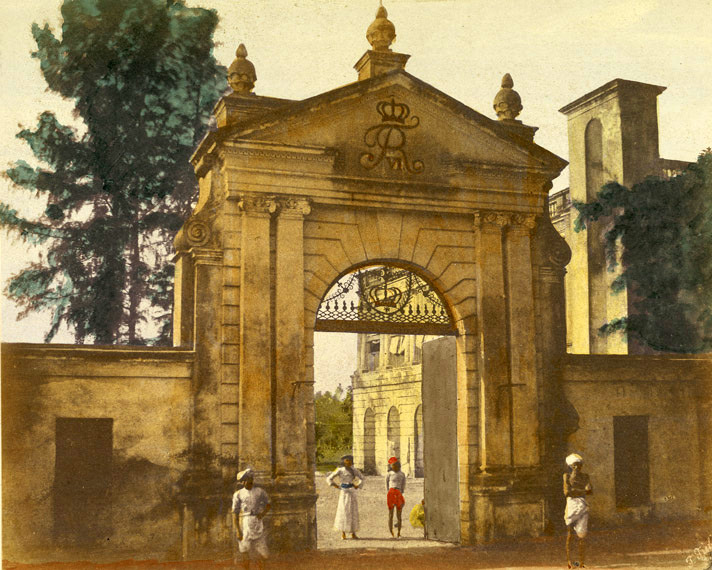
Gateway to the former Danish settlement of Serampore on the Hooghly River north of Calcutta

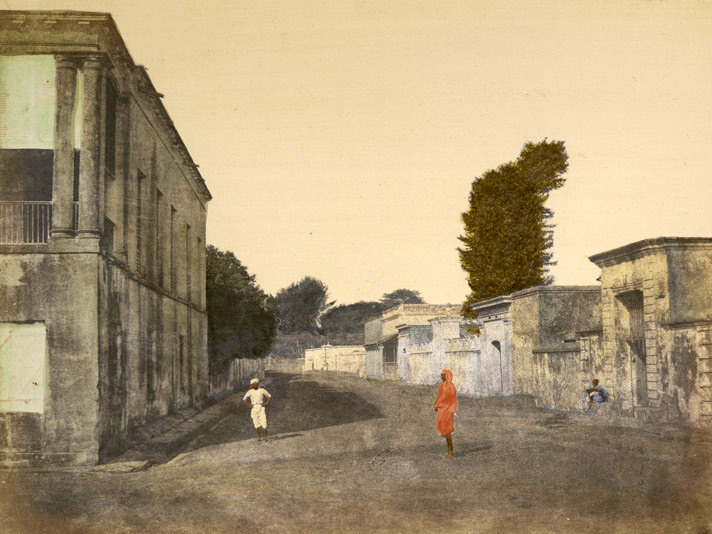
A street in Chandernagore, French India

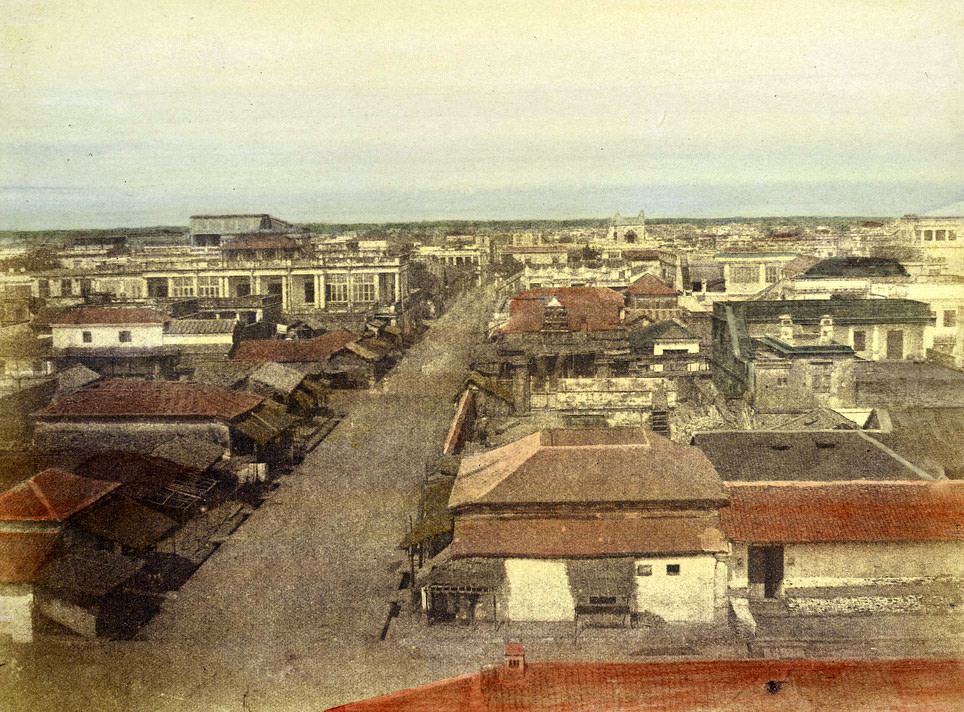
A so-called Black Town in Madras

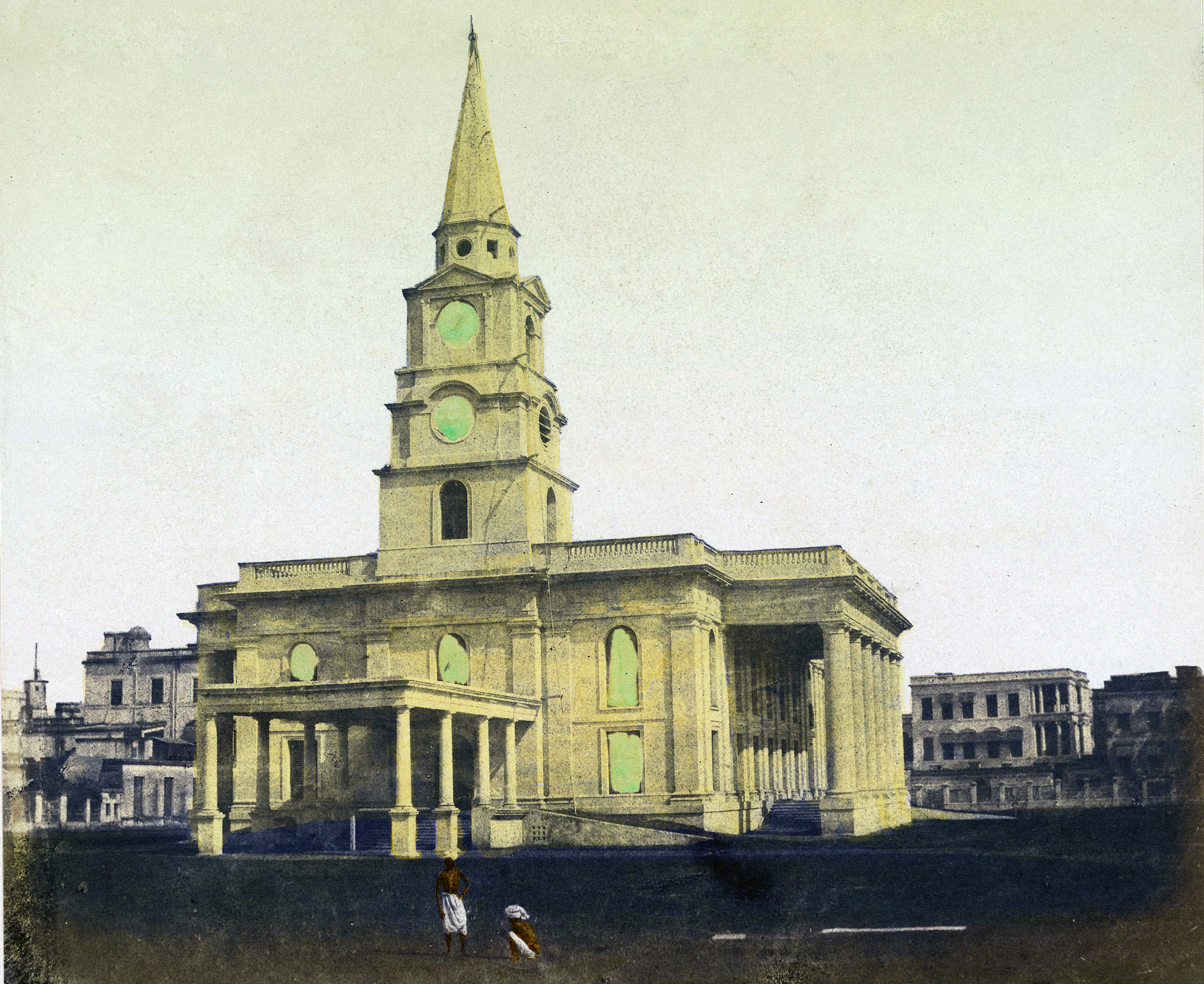
St John's Cathedral, Calcutta

== See also ==
- Photography in India
- Samuel Bourne
- John Burke (photographer)
- Linnaeus Tripe
