= Great Eastern Hotel, Kolkata =

Five star hotel in Kolkata, India

Coordinates: 22.5684°N 88.3495°E

The LaLiT Great Eastern Hotel
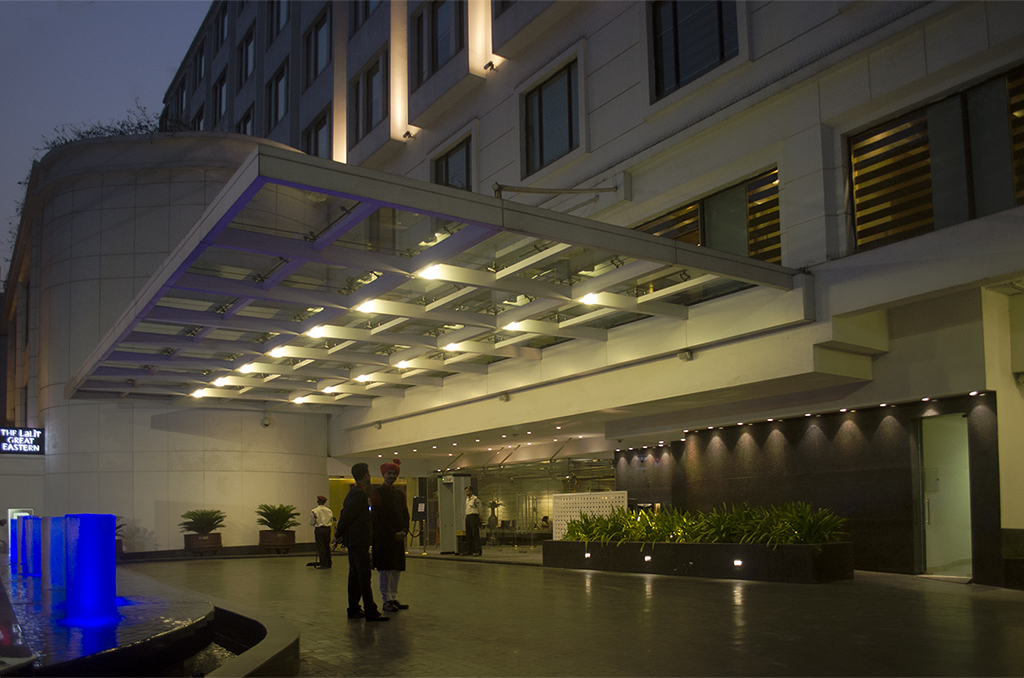
- The LaLiT Great Eastern Hotel entrance
- Interactive map of the The LaLiT Great Eastern Hotel area

General information
- Location: B.B.D. Bagh, Kolkata, West Bengal, India
- Opening: 1840; 186 years ago; 19 November 2013 (reopened)
- Owner: The LaLiT Hotels

Other information
- Number of restaurants: 5

The Great Eastern Hotel (officially The LaLiT Great Eastern Kolkata) is a colonial era hotel in the Indian city of Kolkata (formerly Calcutta). The hotel was established in 1840/41; at a time when Calcutta, the seat of the East India Company, was the most important city in India. Referred to as "Jewel of the East" in its heyday, Great Eastern Hotel hosted several notable persons visiting the city. After India's independence in 1947, the hotel continued its business and later the state government took over the management. In 2005 it was sold to a private company and was reopened in November 2013 after an extensive renovation.

== History ==
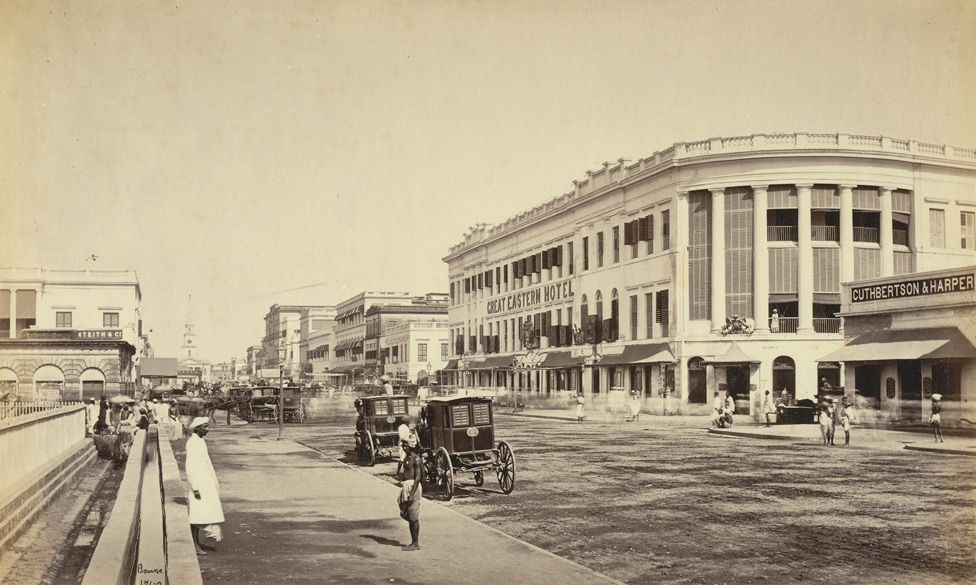
The Great Eastern Hotel (Calcutta) in 1865

The British brought modern hotels to Kolkata. The oldest was John Spence's Hotel. Spence's, the first ever hotel in Asia was opened to the public in 1830. The Great Eastern Hotel was established in 1840 or 1841 by David Wilson as the Auckland Hotel, named after George Eden, 1st Earl of Auckland, then Governor General of India. Prior to opening the hotel, Wilson ran a bakery at the same site. The hotel opened with 100 rooms and a department store on the ground floor (Spence's Hotel, established in 1830 but no longer in existence, is considered to be the first major hotel in Calcutta). The Auckland was expanded in the 1860s and its managing company renamed from D. Wilson and Co. to Great Eastern Hotel Wine and General Purveying Co. It was also amongst the first to have an Indian on its board of directors, in 1859. It became the Great Eastern Hotel in 1915. In 1883 the premises of the hotel were electrified, thus probably becoming the first hotel in India, to be illuminated by electricity.

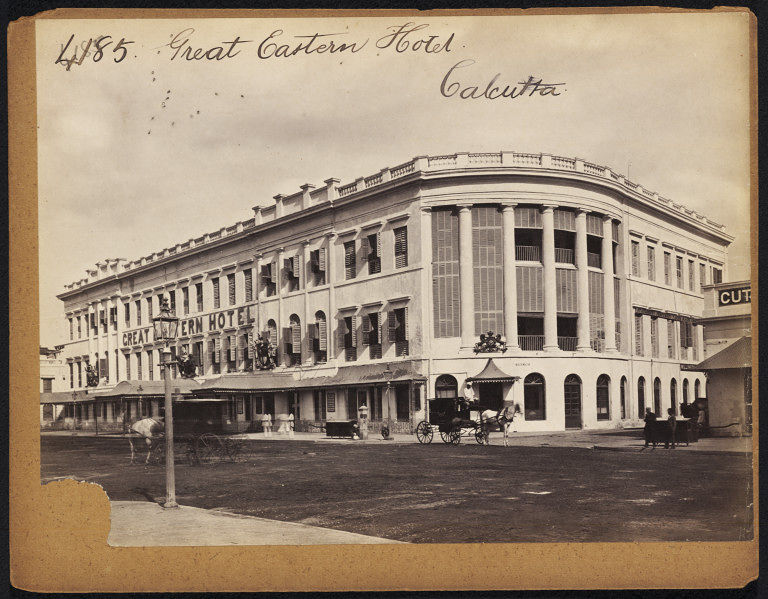
Another image, taken between 1850 and 1870

During its heyday, the hotel was known variously as the "Jewel of the East" and the "Savoy of the East" and was prosaically described by Kipling in his short story City of Dreadful Night. It was said of the hotel in 1883 that "a man could walk in at one end, buy a complete outfit, a wedding present, or seeds for the garden, have an excellent meal, a burra peg (double) and if the barmaid was agreeable, walk out at the other end engaged to be married". The hotel has housed many famous personalities including Nikita Khrushchev and Nikolai Bulganin, Elizabeth II, Mark Twain, Dave Brubeck and possibly Ho Chi Minh. The management of the hotel was taken over by the state government in the 1970s and continued operations for over 30 years. The state sold it to the private group The LaLiT Hotels, Palaces and Resorts in 2005. Until its closure for restoration in 2005, the hotel was the longest continuously operating hotel in Asia.

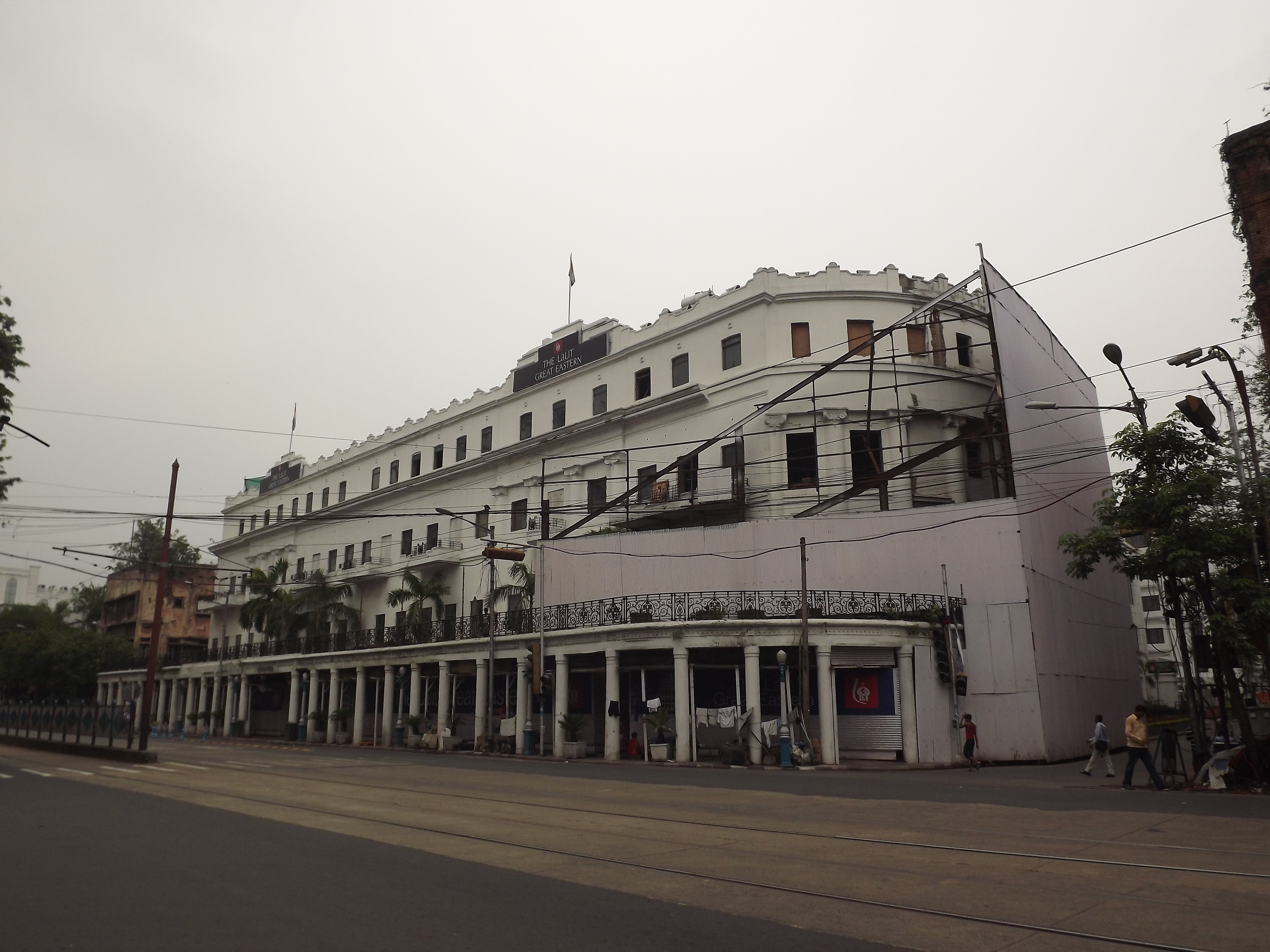
Renovation going on after it was taken over by LaLiT

The hotel remained closed for a number of years for extensive renovations. It reopened with a soft launch as The LaLiT Great Eastern Hotel on 19 November 2013. The building is registered as a heritage structure and the renovations maintained essential features of the building, such as its facade and the grand staircase. The hotel has been divided into three parts – Heritage I, Heritage II and New Block.

== Gallery ==
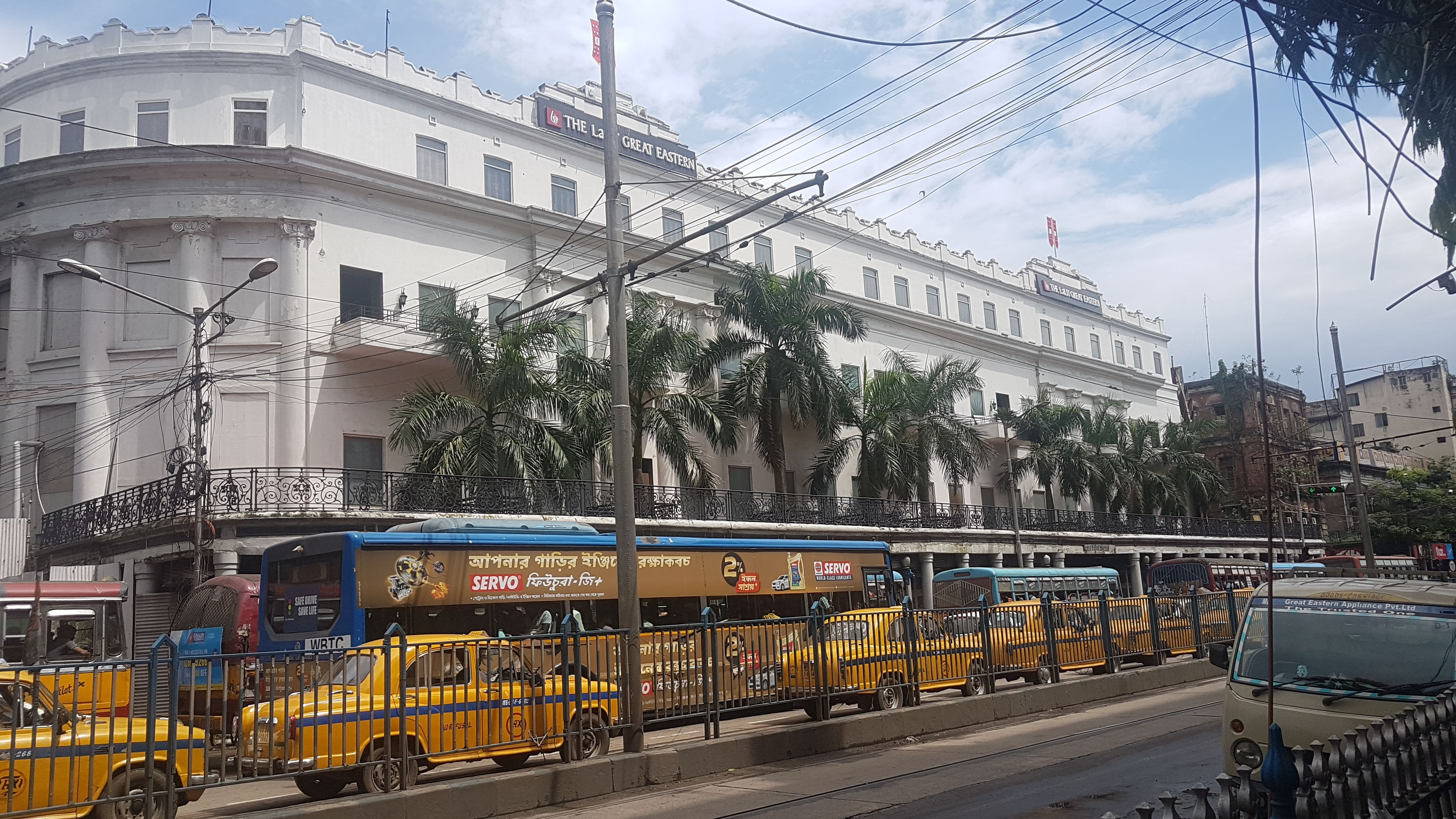
View of The LaLiT Great Eastern Hotel (Kolkata) from Hemanta Basu Sarani

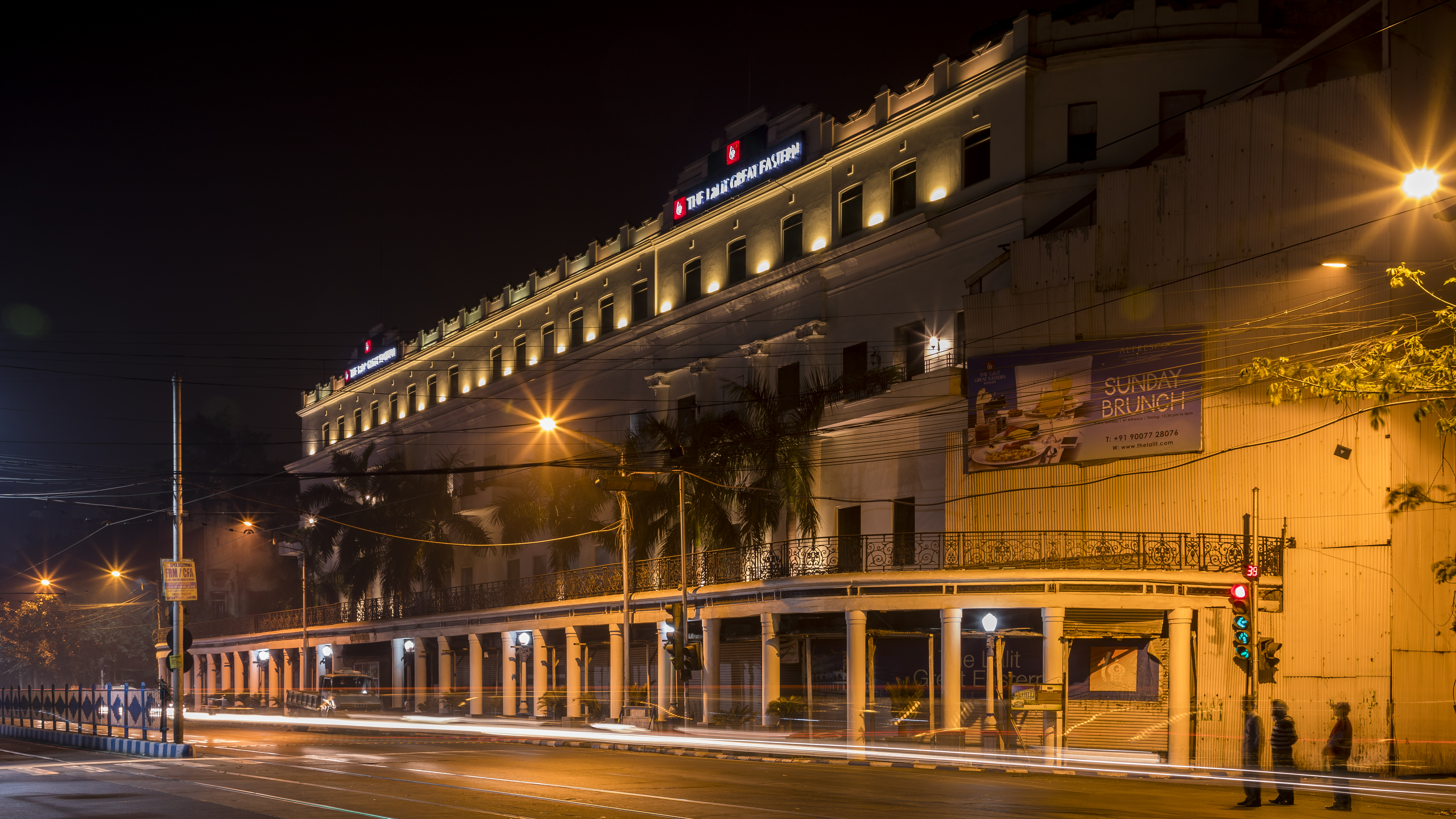
The LaLiT Great Eastern Hotel (Kolkata) Night View

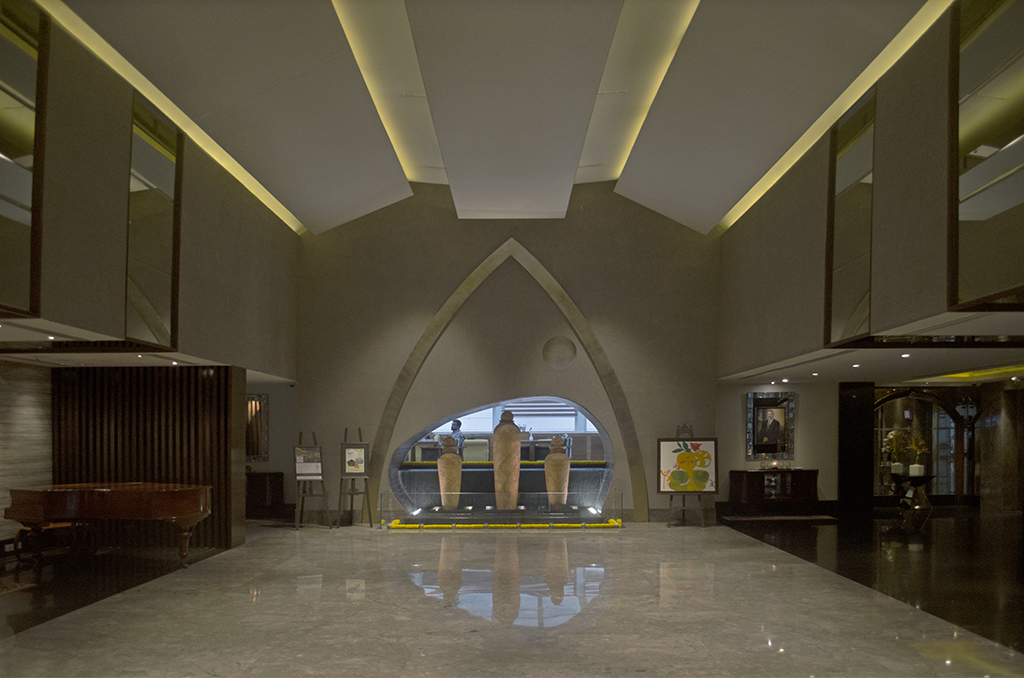
The LaLiT Great Eastern Hotel (Kolkata), Lobby
