= Chalthan =

- Census town
- Location in Gujarat, India Chalthan (India)
- Coordinates: 21°08′11″N 72°57′26″E
- Country: India
- State: Gujarat
- City: Surat

Population (2001)
  - Total: 12,746

Languages
  - Official: Gujarati, Hindi
- Time zone: UTC+5:30 (IST)
- 394305: 394305
- Vehicle registration: GJ 05
- Website: gujaratindia.com

Chalthan is a census town in Surat City in the state of Gujarat, India.

== Demographics ==
As of 2001 India census, Chalthan had a population of 12,746. Males constitute 57% of the population and females 43%. Chalthan has an average literacy rate of 71%, higher than the national average of 65%; with male literacy of 78% and female literacy of 62%. 14% of the population is under 6 years of age.

== Famous ==
Chalthan is mainly famous for its sugar mill & Mangos Jagdamba bakery is very known bakery there

== Schools ==
- Adarsh hindi vidyalaya
- Bhardwaj Public School
- Little flower high school
- Holy cross
- Global international school
- Apex school
- K.V.Mehta Vidhyalaya
- Phoenix k12 school
- Primary school

== See also ==
- List of tourist attractions in Surat
