= India Photo Archive Foundation =

Indian charitable trust

The India Photo Archive Foundation is a Public Charitable Trust engaged in digitising, annotating, and preserving photographic archives. This came out as a result of Aditya Arya Archive by Aditya Arya, a photographer in India. The Foundation has been active since 2009.

== Vision ==
The aim of the Foundation is preservation of photographic data for use of future generations. The idea is to preserve the original as well as create a digital version of negatives and prints so that a visual history database can be created. This is to enable the discourse on history to be extended to a larger population as the medium is visual rather than literal. The Foundation uses exhibitions, publications and the internet as media to share the works of the archives it has access to.

== Vintage Analogue Camera Museum ==
The Foundation has a Vintage Camera Museum next to the office of Aditya Arya. The museum showcases cameras and other photography material all the way from the late 1800s. It has cameras of Kodak, Mamiya, Fujifilm, Hasselblad etc. This goes along with the historical photographs of Kulwant Roy which contain nationalist leaders such as Mahatma Gandhi, Jawaharlal Nehru, Sardar Patel, Mohummad Ali Jinnah, Khan Abdul Ghaffar Khan etc. and general images if India before and after independence all of which belong to Aditya Arya Archive. It is open for viewing free of charge.

== Projects ==
=== Exhibitions ===
The Foundation displays pictures at its museum by Kulwant Roy and has organised exhibitions in collaboration with others of his works. Notable instances of this are; the exhibition of Kulwant Roy’s work that took place at Delhi’s Indira Gandhi National Centre for the Arts (IGNCA) in October 2008., an exhibition of photographs from 'History in the Making – The visual archives of Kulwant Roy'(the book written by Aditya Arya and Invindar Kamtekar based on the photographs by Roy), was organized in collaboration with Indian Council for Cultural Relations and India Canada Association at three venues in Canada in June, 2009: 5th Parallel Gallery, Riddell Center, University of Regina; George Bothwell Dunlop Art Gallery, Regina and Simon Fraser University, Vancouver, The Gandhi Memorial Center, Washington, D.C. held an exhibition of photographs from same book, sponsored by the Indian Council for Cultural Relations and in cooperation with the Indian Embassy of India in October, 2009, soon after the book launch of 'History in the Making', The Piramal Art Gallery at Mumbai’s National Center for Performing Arts hosted an exhibition of Roy’s works in April, 2010, the exhibition 'Where Three Dreams Cross, 150 Years of Photography from India, Pakistan and Bangladesh', at the Whitechapel Gallery in London in April 2011, displayed some selected images from the Kulwant Roy collection and an exhibition of Roy's works title 'The Visual Archives of Kulwant Roy' was held at the National Gallery of Modern Art(NGMA), New Delhi which was inaugurated on 14 November 2012.

=== Publications ===
The book launch and exhibition of 'History in the Making – The visual archives of Kulwant Roy' was organized at Teen Murti, New Delhi in April, 2010. Mrs.GursharanKaur, wife of India’s Prime Minister Manmohann Singh, was invited as a special guest at the occasion.,

'History in the Making – The visual archives of Kulwant Roy' was launched at Mayfair’s Nehru Centre, London by the High Commissioner of India in May, 2010. Book launch and exhibition of History in the making – The visual archives of Kulwant Roy took place at Morlaix France in September, 2010.

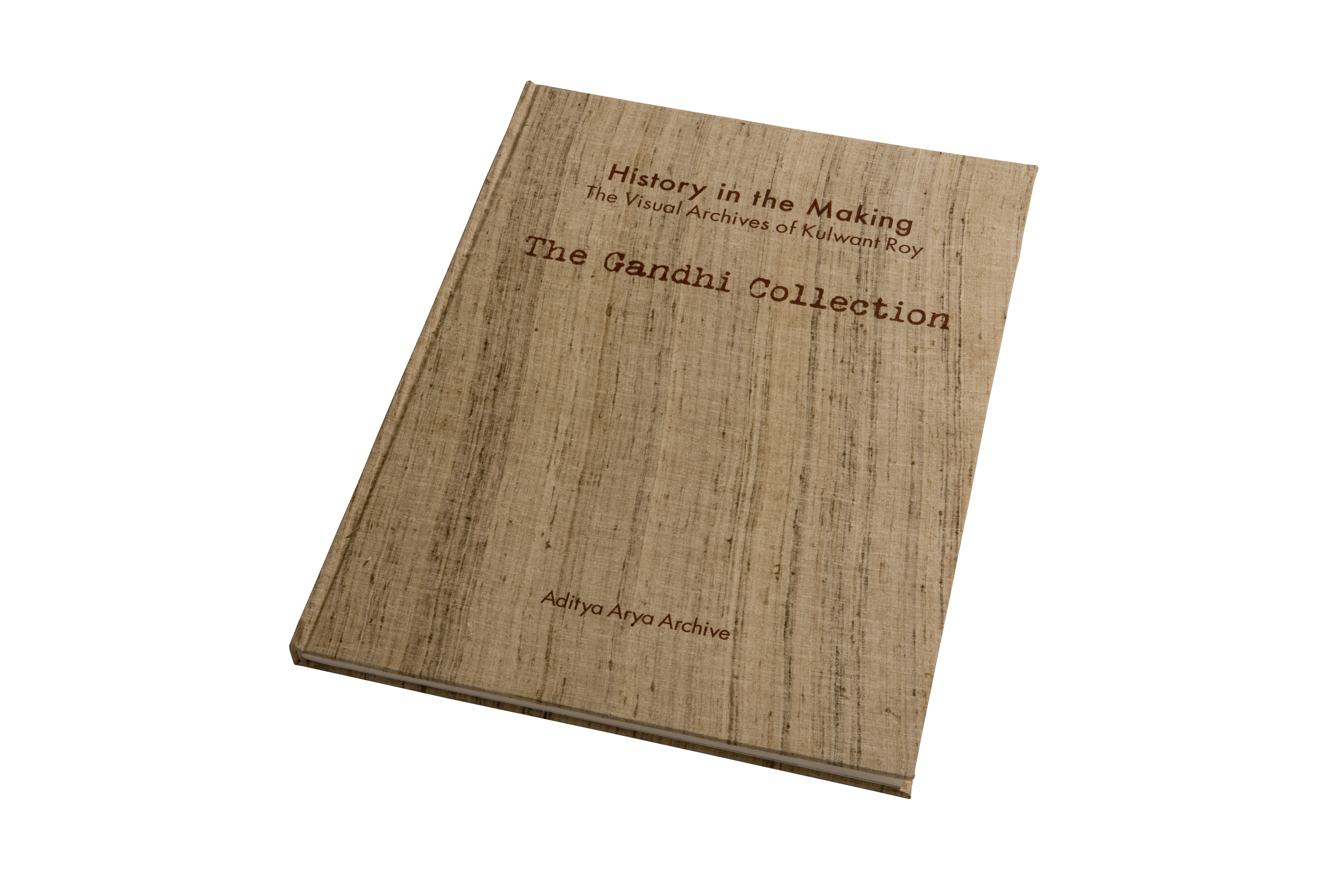
History in the Making- Gandhi Collection

A collector's edition called 'History in the Making, Visual Archives of Kulwant Roy- Gandhi Collection' was published by the Foundation with only 200 copies. It is presented in a pure raw silk box and bound with pure raw Khadi cloth. The first one was bought by Manmohan Singh, the second by Suresh Neotia and the Third was gifted to President Obama in November 2009

=== Films ===
A film was shot about the Kulwant Roy collection and screened on Doordarshan talking about Aditya Arya's and the Foundation's work on the collection

== Archiving and digitizing ==
The Foundation preserves old and broken negatives and prints and makes digital copies of them too. It also works towards restoration of old archival material.
