= Kulwant Roy =

Indian photographer

- Born: 1914; Ludhiana, British India (Now Ludhiana, Punjab, India)
- Died: 1984 (aged 69-70); New Delhi, India
- Known for: Photography
- Notable work: Indian Historic Photography

Kulwant Roy (1914, Village Bagli Kalan, District Ludhiana, Punjab, British India – 1984) was an Indian photographer. As the head of an agency named "Associated Press Photographs", he was personally responsible for several iconic images of the Indian independence movement and the early years of the Republic of India.

== Life and career ==
=== Indian Independence movement ===
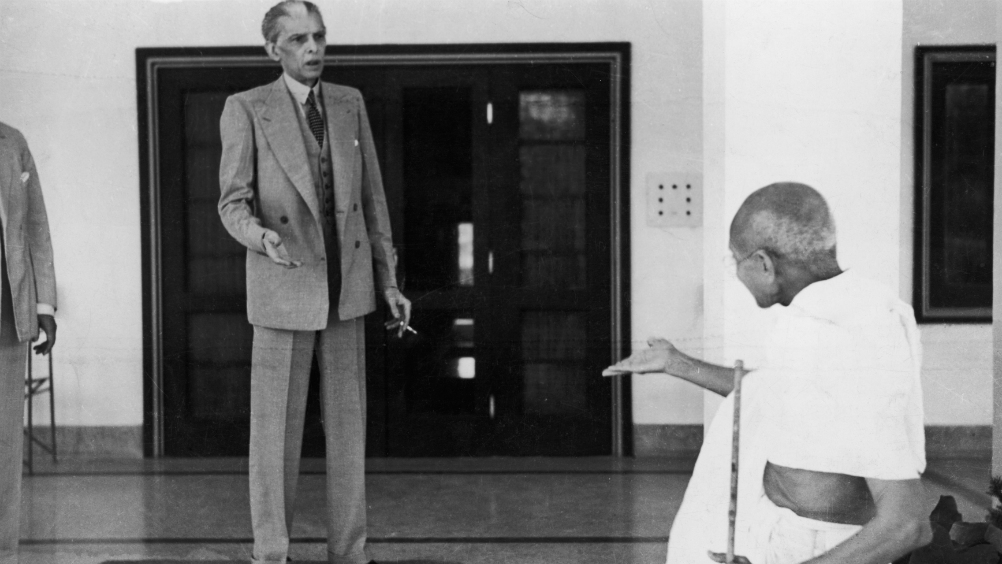
Mahatma Gandhi and Jinnah in a heated conversation; a well-known photograph recently attributed to Kulwant Roy

Born in 1914, Kulwant Roy grew up in Lahore before joining the Royal Indian Air Force where he specialised in aerial photography. After being discharged from the RIAF, he returned to Lahore, but moved to Delhi in 1940 where he set up a studio, which later expanded into a full-fledged agency, in the Mori Gate district of Old Delhi. For a few years previously, he had been following Mahatma Gandhi in his travels around India in a third-class train compartment; that experience permitted him to gain insider status that meant that he was permitted to record many crucial events of and major participants in the independence movement, including Jinnah, Nehru and Patel.

Among his most iconic photographs are one of Jinnah arguing with Gandhi on the verandah of his bungalow; normally credited to the Hulton-Getty archive, it has recently been established that it was one of many such taken by Roy. Others include a similarly well-known photograph of Nehru and Khan Abdul Ghaffar Khan walking as AICC representatives to meet the Cabinet Mission while a rickshaw carrying Patel travels alongside. A photograph of Nehru and Patel listening intently to Gandhi at a Congress Working Committee meeting was made into a commemorative stamp after Patel's death in 1950; it won a silver plaque from Amrita Bazar Patrika as the best news photograph of the year.

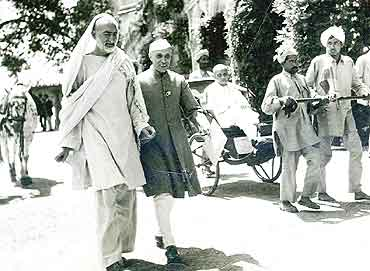
Khan Abdul Ghaffar Khan and Jawaharlal Nehru walk to a Congress meeting while Sardar Patel is pulled alongside in a rickshaw. Roy's access provided him with ample opportunities for informal photographs.

=== Post Independence ===
After independence in 1947, Roy continued to photograph Nehru in particular, taking several photographs of the Nehru-Gandhi family and one of Nehru sitting pensively in cricket flannels, his chin resting on his bat. Also in the 1950s, he was one of the first to document the trek by pilgrims to the cave at Amarnath in Kashmir.

=== Later years and death ===
In 1958 he packed up his studio and set out on a trip around the world. For three years he took almost continuous photographs, visiting more than thirty countries, and every month mailing the previous month's negatives back to his office in India. When he returned in 1961, he discovered to his horror that all the packages had been stolen. For years thereafter he would spend weekends driving around garbage dumps in Delhi looking for the lost negatives.

He died in New Delhi in 1984, working till the end; at the time of his death from cancer he was working on the negatives of the Seventh Non-Aligned Movement Conference.

He left his surviving photographic negatives and archives to his nephew. This collection is in the process of being scanned and organised, and reportedly contains images exhaustively chronicling most major incidents of the period, including the Cripps Mission and the INA trials; after independence, they include a series documenting the development of the Bhakra-Nangal dam and photographs from the front of the Sino-Indian War, which he organised by day.

== Exhibitions and publications ==
The India Photo Archive Foundation displays pictures at its museum by Kulwant Roy and has organised exhibitions in collaboration with others of his works. Notable instances of this are; the exhibition of Kulwant Roy's work that took place at Delhi's Indira Gandhi National Centre for the Arts (IGNCA) in October 2008., an exhibition of photographs from 'History in the Making – The visual archives of Kulwant Roy'(the book written by Aditya Arya and Invindar Kamtekar based on the photographs by Roy), was organised in collaboration with Indian Council for Cultural Relations and India Canada Association at three venues in Canada in June 2009: 5th Parallel Gallery, Riddell Center, University of Regina; George Bothwell Dunlop Art Gallery, Regina and Simon Fraser University, Vancouver, The Gandhi Memorial Center, Washington, D.C. held an exhibition of photographs from same book, sponsored by the Indian Council for Cultural Relations and in co-operation with the Indian Embassy of India in October 2009, soon after the book launch of 'History in the Making', The Piramal Art Gallery at Mumbai's National Center for Performing Arts hosted an exhibition of Roy's works in April 2010, the exhibition 'Where Three Dreams Cross, 150 Years of Photography from India, Pakistan and Bangladesh', at the Whitechapel Gallery in London in April 2011, displayed some selected images from the Kulwant Roy collection and an exhibition of Roy's works title 'The Visual Archives of Kulwant Roy' was held at the National Gallery of Modern Art(NGMA), New Delhi which was inaugurated on 14 November 2012.

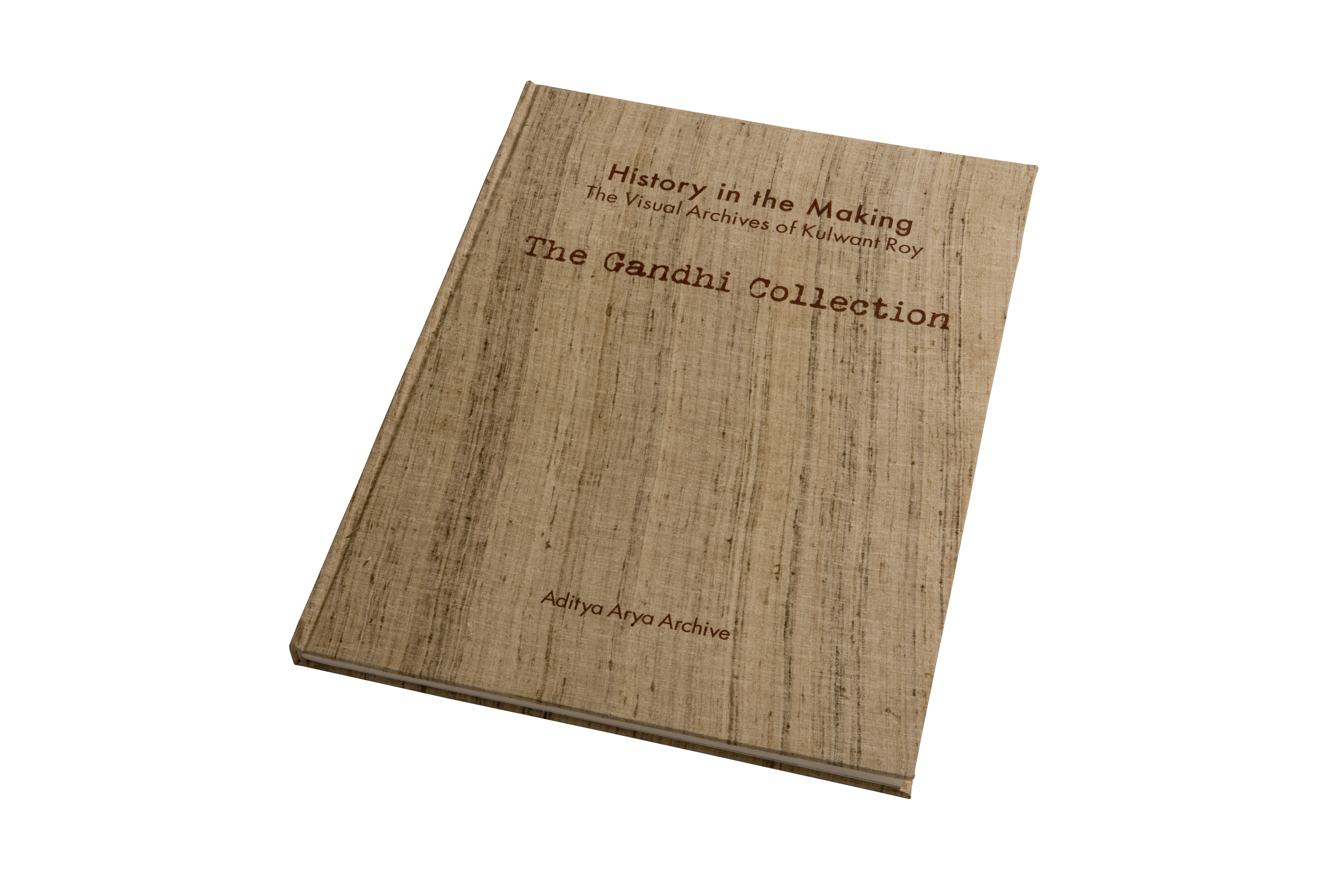
History in the Making- Gandhi Collection

The book launch and exhibition of 'History in the Making – The visual archives of Kulwant Roy' was organised at Teen Murti, New Delhi in April 2010. Mrs. Gursharan Kaur, wife of India's Prime Minister Manmohann Singh, was invited as a special guest at the occasion., 'History in the Making – The visual archives of Kulwant Roy' was launched at Mayfair's Nehru Centre, London by the High Commissioner of India in May 2010. Book launch and exhibition of History in the making – The visual archives of Kulwant Roy took place at Morlaix France in September 2010. A collector's edition called 'History in the Making, Visual Archives of Kulwant Roy- Gandhi Collection' was published by the India Photo Archive Foundation with only 200 copies. Other than this, a short film was also made on the collection of his photographs.
