= Philip Adolphe Klier =

German photographer (c. 1845–1911)

- Born: 1845; Offenbach, German Confederation
- Died: 27 March 1911 (aged 65–66); Rangoon, British Burma
- Occupations: Photographer, optician, watchmaker
- Known for: Photographs of 19th-century Burma

Philip Adolphe Klier (c. 1845 – 27 March 1911), also known as Philip Klier, was a German photographer, who arrived in Burma as a young man around 1865 and spent the rest of his life there. Mainly working as self-trained photographer and businessman, Klier took hundreds of photographs at the end of the 19th century during the British colonial period in Burma. His photographs, taken both in his studio as well as on location, were mainly sold as picture postcards for foreign visitors. They have also been published in several books and collected in public archives. Among a small number of other photographers, Klier is considered as one of the earliest professional photographers in the history of today's Myanmar.

== Life and work ==
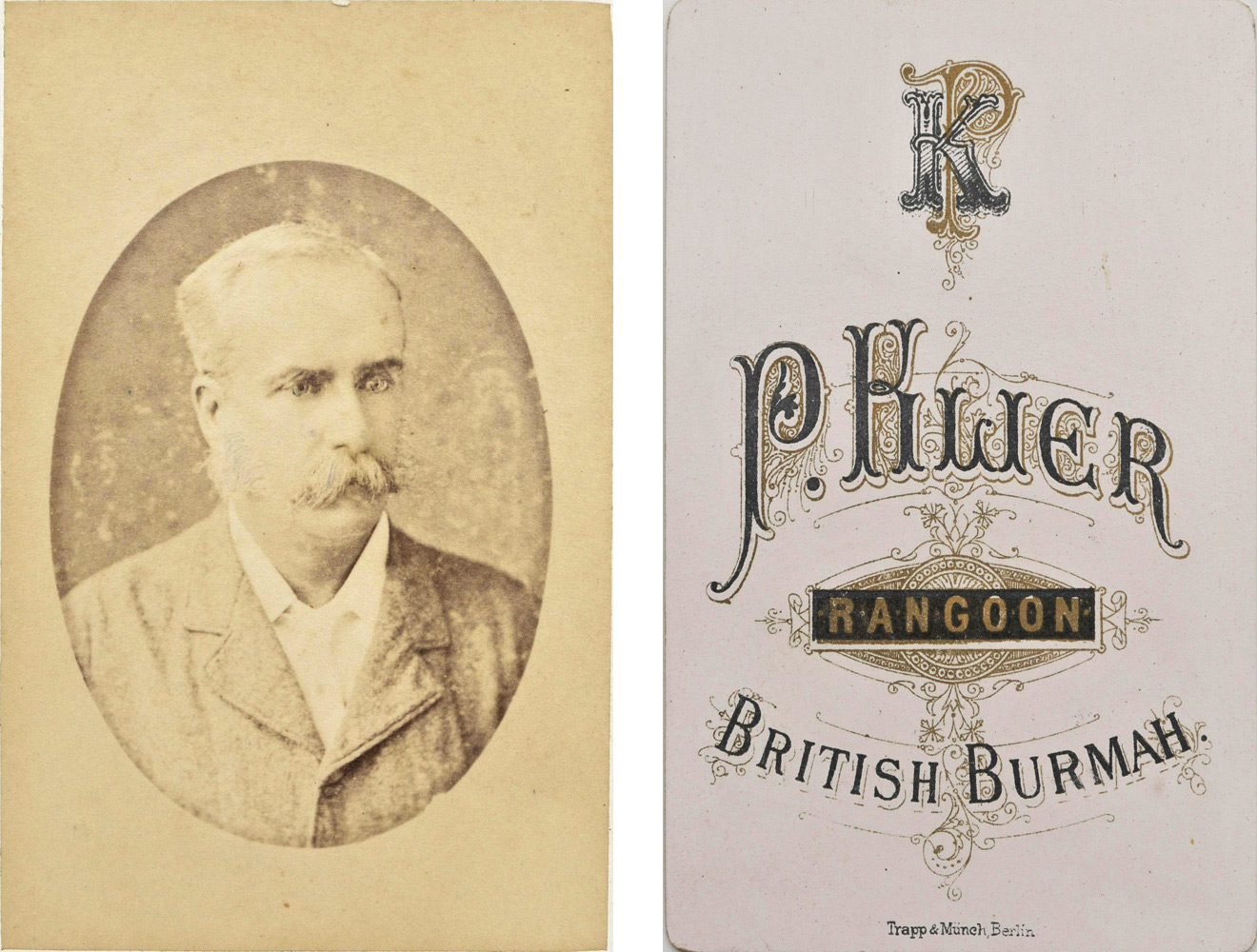
Portrait of an unknown man, by Philip Klier, Rangoon, British Burma

=== Beginnings in Moulmein ===
After having emigrated from Germany, Klier first settled in Moulmein (now Mawlamyine, Mon State), the first capital of British Burma, in 1865, and started to work as a watchmaker in a small community of German watchmakers, opticians and photographers. Having acquired the technical skills of photography under the given climatic conditions, he set up his first studio in Moulmein.

=== Expanding business in Rangoon ===
After 1880, Klier and his family moved to the capital Rangoon, where he operated from his studio in Signal Pagoda Road. There, he found better chances for selling his photographs used on mailable postcards that he had printed in Germany with the inscription “Copyright’ P. Klier, Rangoon”. The customers were mainly British and other foreign officers, businessmen and visitors. For five years after 1885, Klier temporarily entered a partnership with J. Jackson, an established British studio photographer, but after that, he continued working on his own. After 1906, some of Klier's photographs were copied by the company D. A. Ahuja, (or T. N. Ahuja, Rangoon), and sometimes sold as hand-coloured postcards.

In 1907, P. Klier & Co sold photographic supplies to the growing demand by photographers and advertised ‘[t]he largest selection of views of Burma and pictorial postcards’ in Thacker's Indian Directory. The 1908 edition of Thomas Cook & Sons Burma. Information for travellers landing at Rangoon printed eight out of a total of fifteen photographs by "Messrs. P. Klier & Co", whose studio was conveniently located in a building next to Thomas Cook's travel agency.

After Klier's death, his company continued working at different locations in Rangoon. In 1912, Klier & Co. started to include Burmese curio sales of silverware, wood, and ivory carvings. The company was listed in commercial archives until 1920.

=== Portraits and scenes of everyday life ===
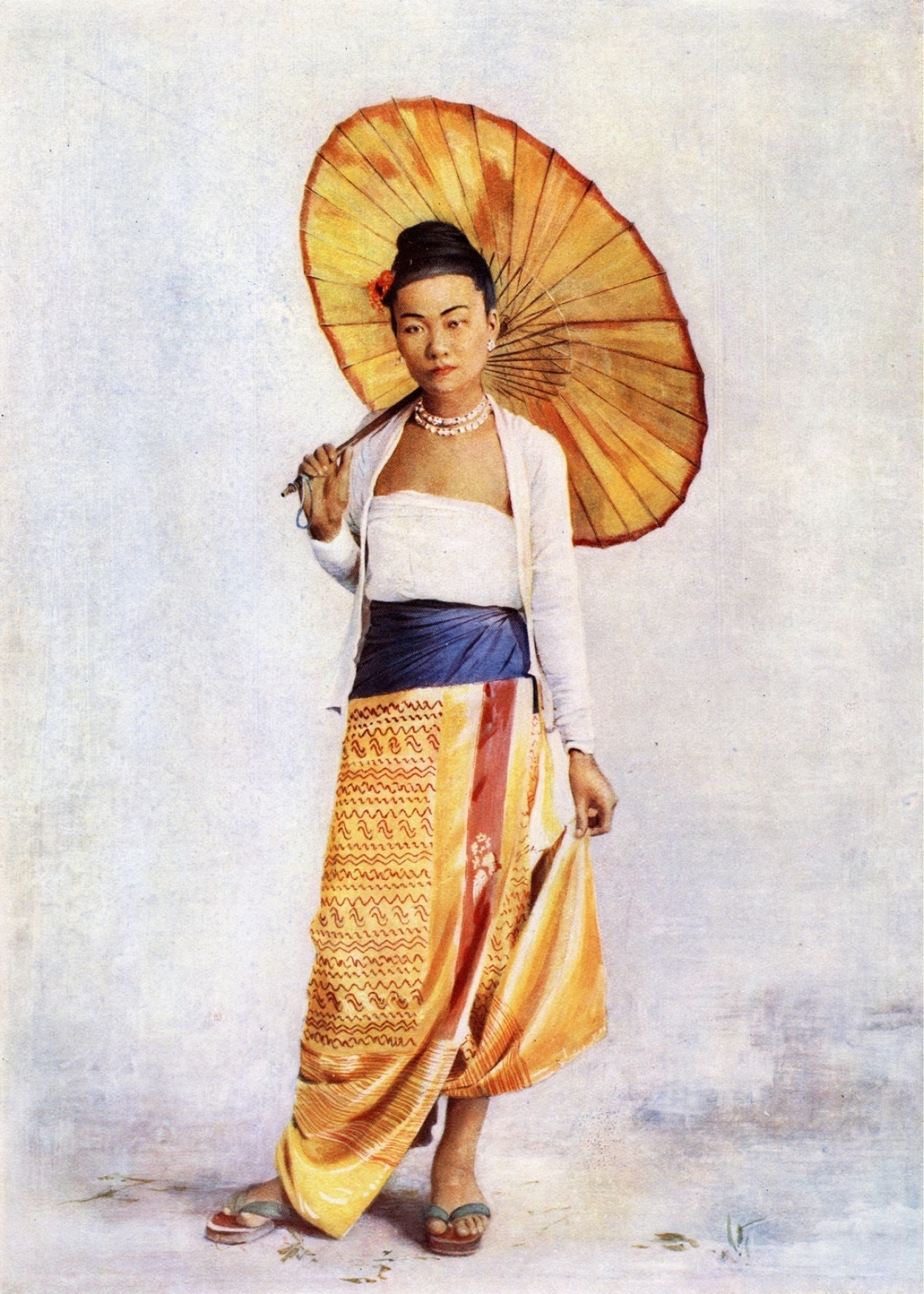
A Burmese lady, hand-colored lithography after an albumen print

The wide range of Klier's images documents his strong interest in both colonial British as well as Burmese life and culture. Many of his photographs were printed as albumen prints, the most popular photographic printing technique of the late 19th century. As the aesthetic styles of portrait photography developed, he changed his approach to presenting the subjects of his portraits: the two early portraits of young English ladies in the style of cabinet cards, taken around 1894 and archived at the National Portrait Gallery in London, or the portrait of an unknown man archived together with Klier's business card attest to the portrait style of the late 1890s. They stand in contrast with his later portraits, such as the picture of a Burmese lady on a hand-colored photoprint on postcard after an original albumen print of 1907, with a blurred background and crisp details of her person, clothes and jewellery in the foreground.

Apart from photographic portraits of Europeans and scenes of busy areas of Rangoon, Klier also carefully staged and recorded portraits of Burmese people in traditional attire, such as a princess and her following or a chief from the princely Shan States in eastern Burma shown below. Besides studio portraits for individual customers, Klier showed an interest in everyday street photography, as by documenting traditional musicians or audiences watching the popular Burmese puppet shows (Yoke thé) of the times. Other scenes show Burmese at work, such as elephants and their keepers at work in timber yards or on paddy boats carrying rice. Klier also took photographs of famous buildings, including Burma's most important religious monument, the Shwedagon Pagoda or the great mosque in Rangoon.

== Critical reception ==
In his book on the history of photography in Burma, art historian Noel Francis Singer characterized Klier's approach as follows: "Klier had an eye for the unusual and many religious buildings which would have been ignored by another were fortunately immortalized by him."

In the introduction to the 2018 photo-book REPRODUCED, rethinking P.A. Klier & D.A. Ahuja, published by Myanmar Photo Archive, art historian Carmín Berchiolly examined some of Klier's portraits of Burmese women from a contemporary perspective. Analyzing two postcards showing the same young woman, one of them titled "A Burmese Village Girl" and the other "A Burmese lady", Berchiolly notes an unusual exposure of bare shoulders and arms of the village girl, and in the reclining lady a "composition that belongs in the Odalisque type, as popularized in French Orientalist painting and which promoted the freedom of the male gaze."

Many of Klier's photographs have been archived and digitized by the British Library and the National Archives in the United Kingdom as well as by the Smithsonian Institution and Getty Images in the United States. Among others, his work has also been published as part of the photographic collection of the Guimet Museum of Asian Arts in Paris, France, the Ethnological Museum of Berlin, Germany, and in the online collection of the Nederlands Photo Museum Rotterdam.

In a 2009 auction by Bonhams in London, an album of 37 albumen prints by Klier with views and portraits of Burma was sold for US-$1,760.

== Gallery ==
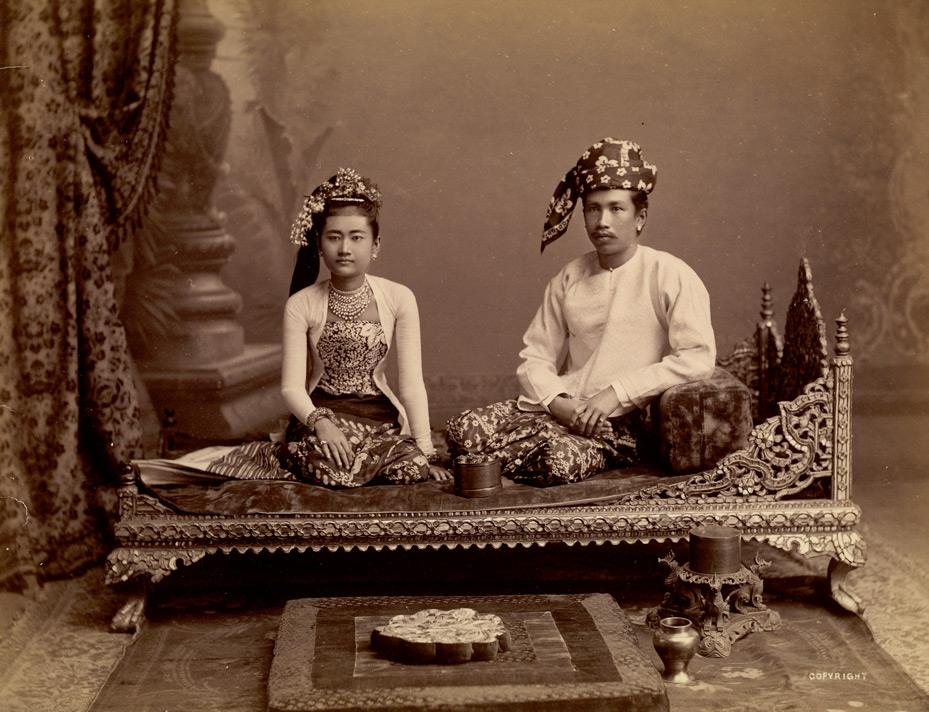
Burmese couple in the 1890s

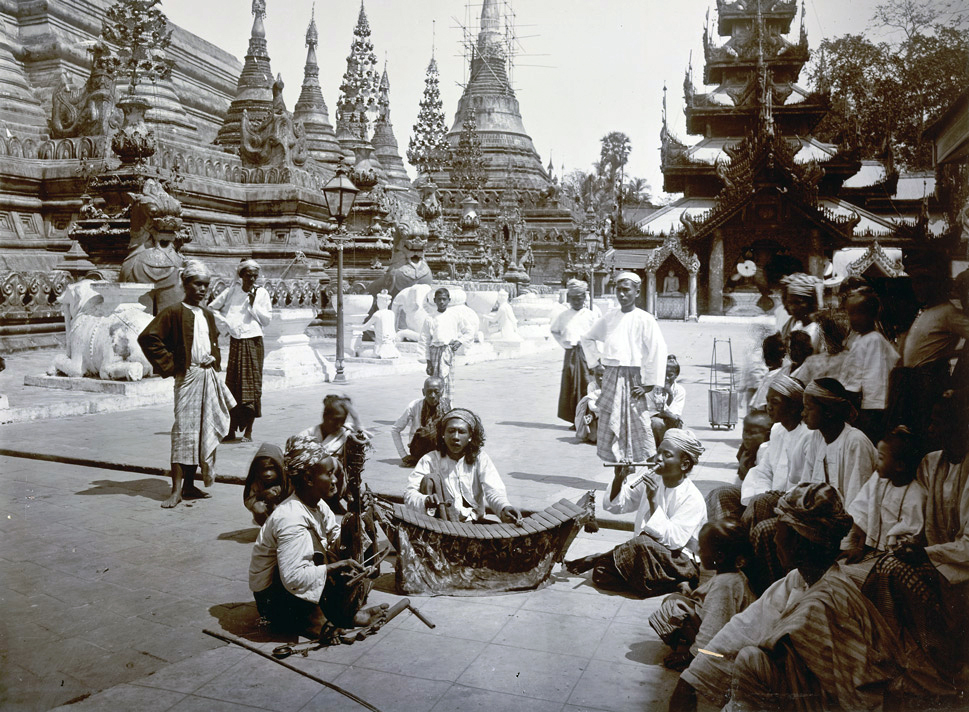
Burmese musicians at the Shwedagon Pagoda

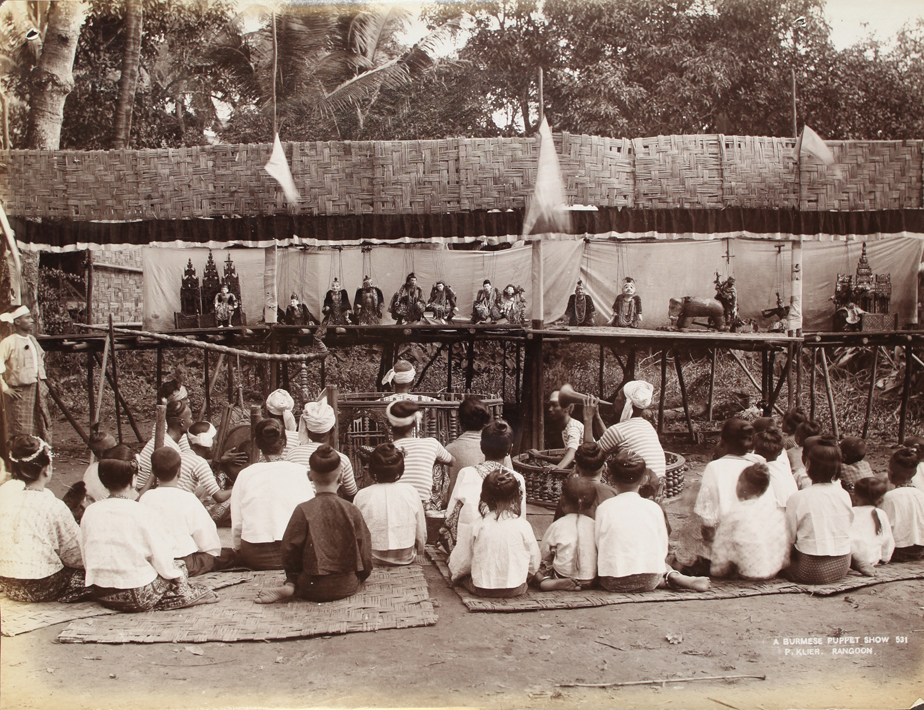
A traditional Burmese puppet show

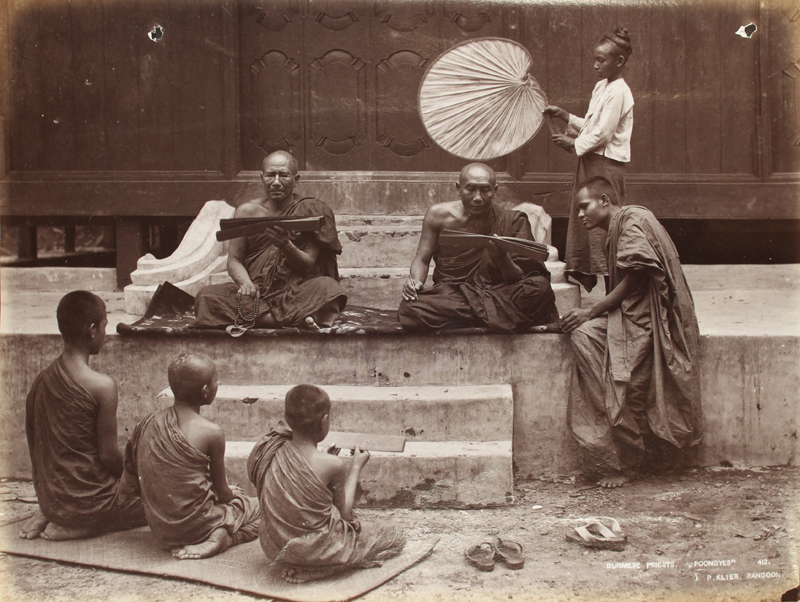
Burmese monks and novices, 1907

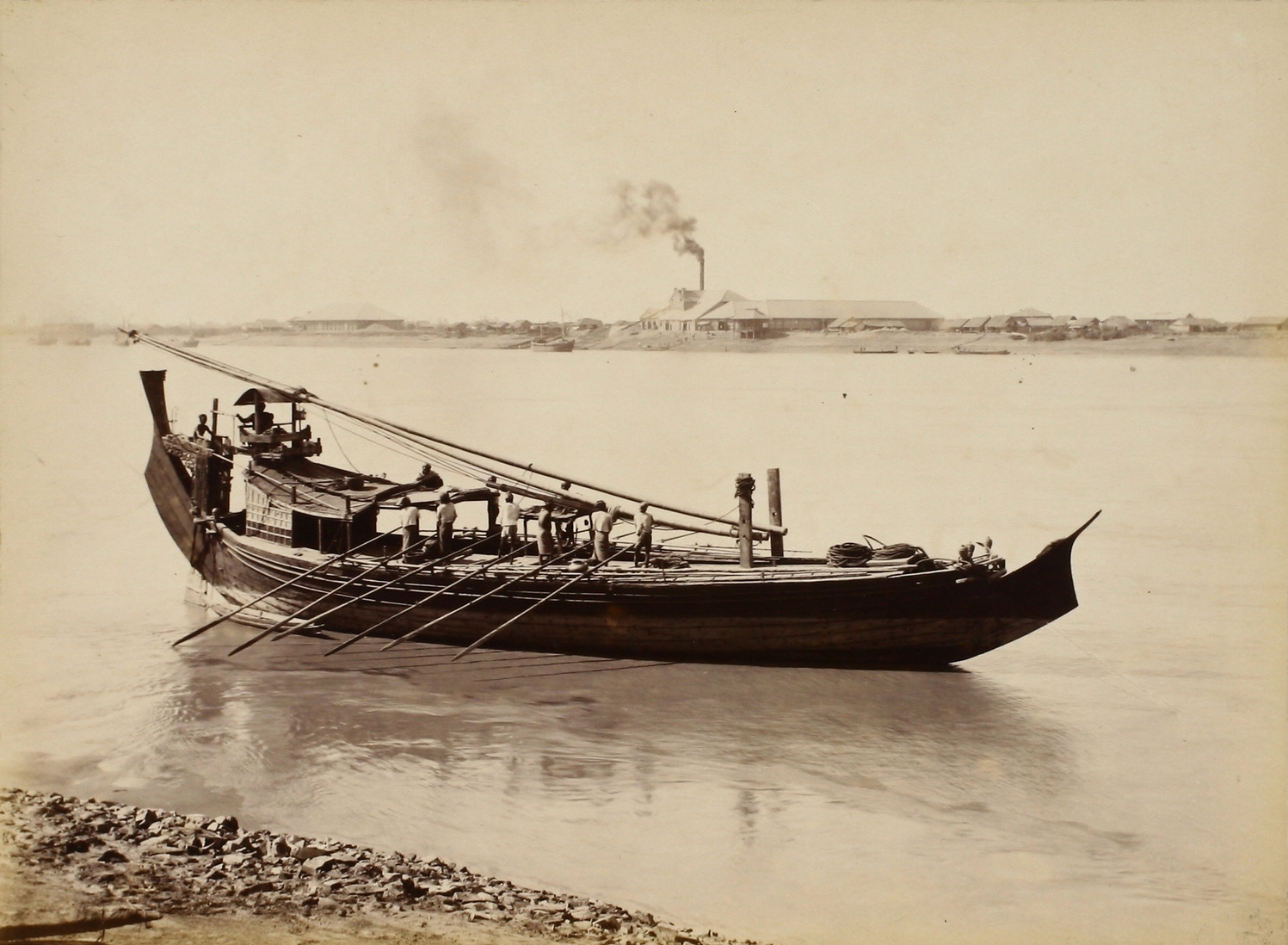
Detail of Burmese Paddy boat, 1907

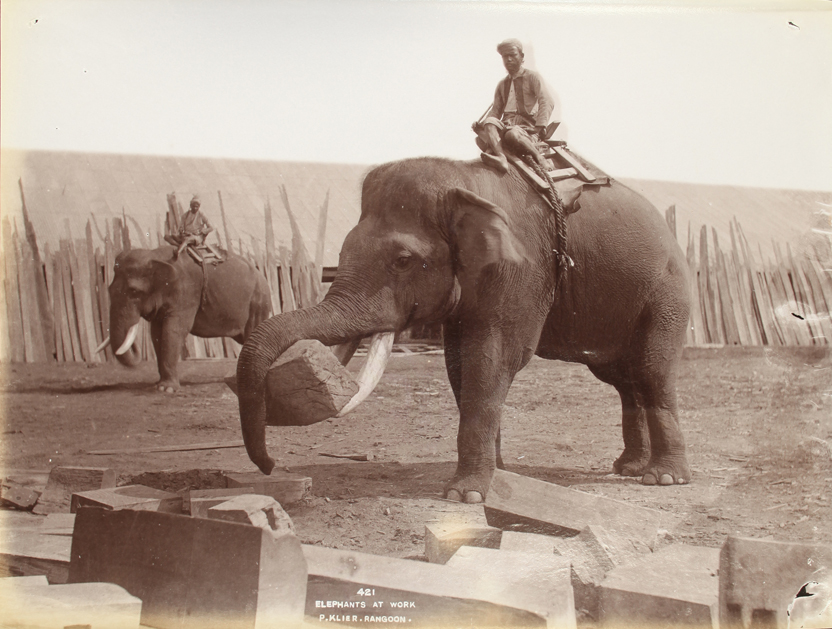
Elephants at work in Rangoon, 1907

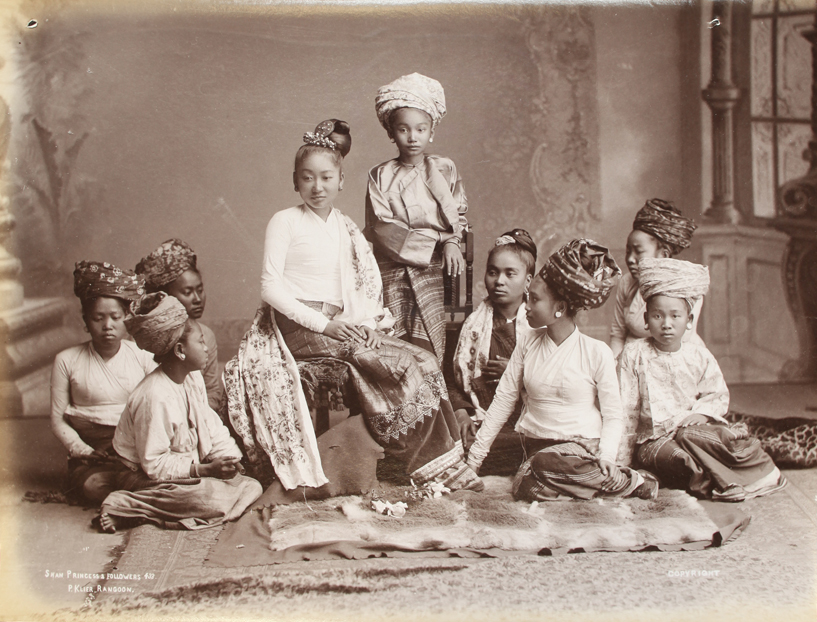
Shan princess and followers, 1907

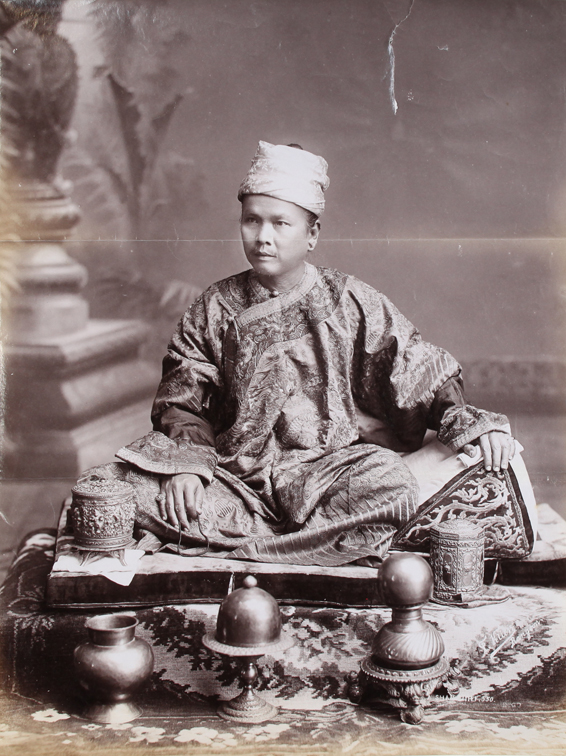
A Shan chief, sitting on a cushion

== See also ==
Other notable photographers of 19th-century Burma:

- John McCosh
- Felice Beato
- Linnaeus Tripe
- Willoughby Wallace Hooper
- Max Henry Ferrars
