= Photographic Society of Madras =

- Formation: 1857
- Headquarters: Chennai, India
- Members: 500
- President: Ramaswami G. N.
- Website: https://www.photomadras.org

The Photographic Society of Madras is in Chennai city of India. Founded in 1857, it is the oldest photographic society in India and one of the oldest in the world. PSM was founded in 1857, with the objective of promoting the Art and Science of Photography. The Society was renamed as Madras Amateur Photographic Society in the mid-1880s and later it reverted to its original name and continues to be known as Photographic Society of Madras. The Photographic Society of Madras is registered under the Tamil Nadu Societies Registration Act 1975. PSM organizes programs including, photo-walks, photo-tours, classes, workshops, salons and exhibitions, on most weeks of the year. Membership is open to anyone with an interest in photography.

== History ==
Alexander Hunter, who founded The Photographic Society was also the driving force behind Madras School of Industrial Arts where the Society used to have its initial meetings. Walter Elliot, a member of the Governor's Council, was elected the first president of the society. Because of his proximity to the corridor of power, Walter Elliot inducted Lord Harris, the Governor of the Madras Presidency as the four Southern States of India were known before Independence and then his successor, Sir Charles Trevelyn as members of the society. In the earlier years of its formation, its members were mostly Europeans - army men and civilians alike. The society met regularly in the premises of the School of Industrial Arts and held annual exhibitions. Linnaeus Tripe, a pioneering photographer of British India, was one of the earliest members of this society.

== Exhibitions ==
The Society has held an annual exhibition since its beginning. The annual exhibition is one of the flagship events of the society which brings photographs from around the world. Apart from annual exhibition it also conducts photography competitions and exhibitions to commemorate specific days and celebrations to bring solidarity among the citizens of the city. The exhibition of member's work during the monthly member's meet is also a regular practise.

== Membership ==
There are no restrictions on membership which includes amateur and professional photographers through to photographic scientists and those involved in exhibiting, curating and writing about photography, as well as those with a general interest in the medium. Many of the great names in photographic history as well as many well-known photographers today have been members.
