= Alexander Hunter (Madras surgeon) =

Scottish surgeon and founder of the Madras School of Arts

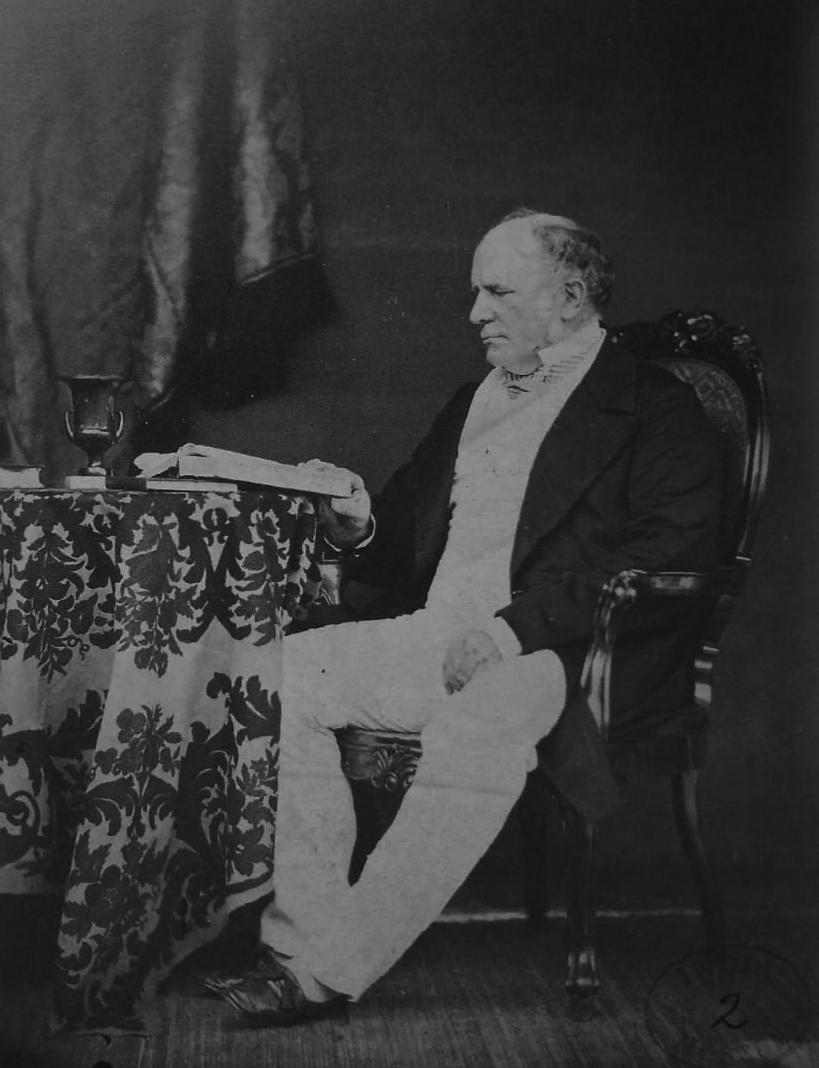
Photograph taken in Madras c. 1860

Alexander Hunter (19 May 1816 – 7 May 1890) was a surgeon in the East India Company's Madras Army who was also a skilled and trained artist. In 1850 he founded the Madras School of Art, the first school of art and design in India, which was taken over by the government in 1855. He was a pioneer of photography in India, introduced courses at the art school, and founded the Madras Photographic Society. He was also a collector of geological specimens, a naturalist with interests in economic products, and a key organizer of the Madras Exhibitions of 1855 and 1857.

== Biography ==
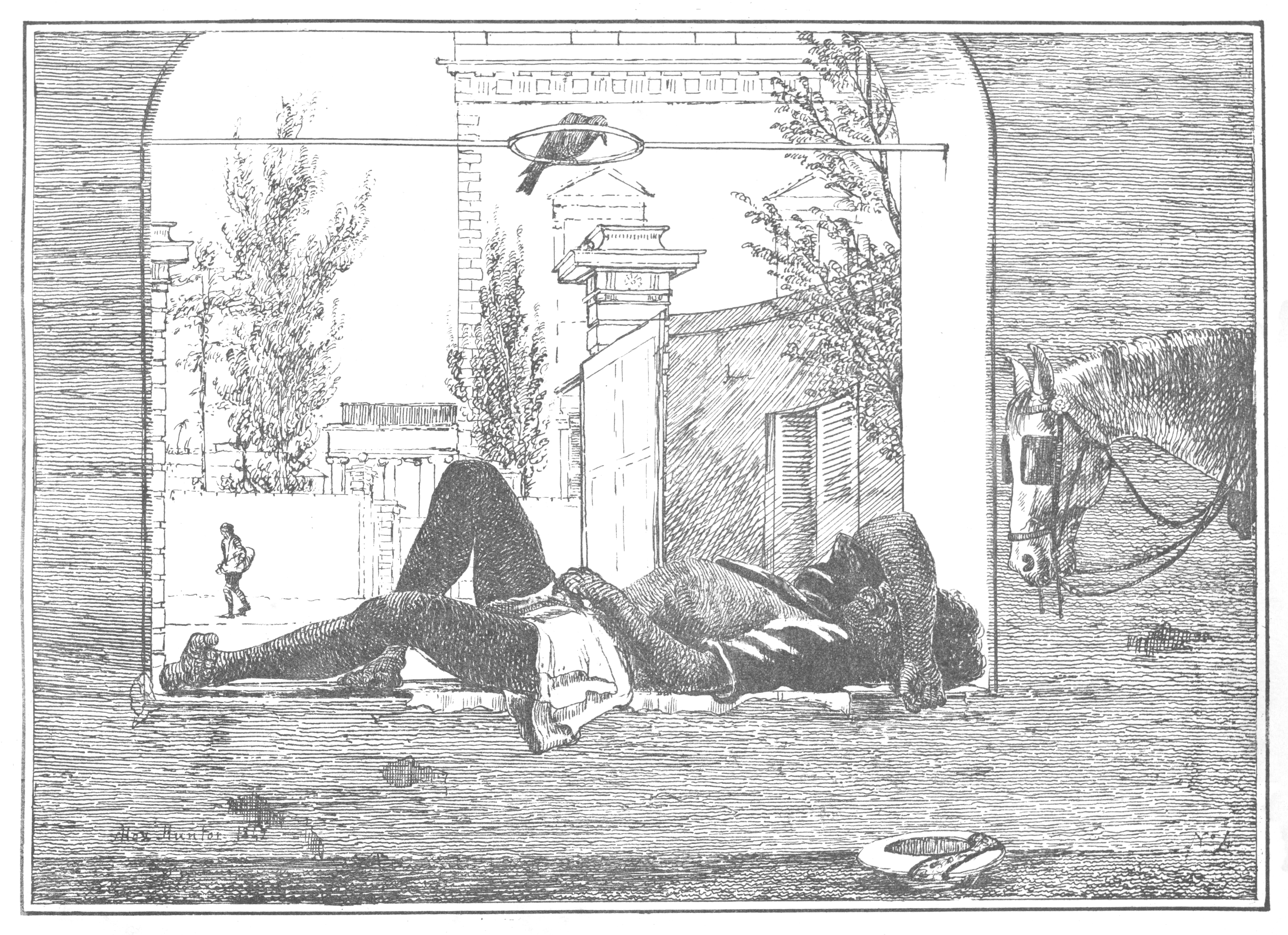
An 1842 lithographic sketch by Hunter

Hunter was born in Chittagong, the son of Richard Hunter who worked in the East India Company Civil Services in Bengal and his wife Margaret, daughter of Alexander Walker who had served as a surgeon in Bengal. The family moved to Edinburgh to live at 1 Doune Terrace around in the mid-1830s. As a town ward councillor, Richard recommended the Freedom of the City of Edinburgh awarded on 30 August 1842 to his friend from Calcutta days, Dwarkanath Tagore. Alexander, along with a cousin James, were among the first students to join the newly founded Edinburgh Academy. In 1831 he joined Edinburgh University and qualified as MD in 1837 and as a Fellow of the Royal College of Surgeons of Edinburgh in 1839 (FRCSEd) in 1839. He visited Calcutta in 1841 in the hope of finding a medical appointment but returned unsuccessful. He however made some sketches which he published. He was nominated in November 1842 for an assistant surgeon post in Madras by EIC director and banker Martin Tucker Smith. Hunter had received some training in art at the Trustees Academy in Edinburgh alongside his medical education which he followed up with studies in Paris. Somewhere before 1850 he worked with prisoners and examined ways for them to engage in useful production of materials such as paper and cordage. He took an interest in plant products and economic botany and collaborated with local botanists like Hugh Cleghorn.

Hunter founded the Madras School of Art on May 1, 1850, as a private institution with the stated aim of "... improving the taste of the native public as regards beauty of form and finish in the articles in daily use among them." He experimented in pottery and a range of crafts, and was involved in the encouragement of local industry. He travelled, mainly in peninsular India, and examined a wide range of materials including wood, fibre, bamboo, and clay. He supported the school with 150 rupees a month from his own salary and from sales of his drawings and paintings. The school had as many as 150 to 180 students a year between 1850 and 1858. The school was taken over by government in 1855 and renamed as the Madras School of Art and Industry, still later the Madras School of Art and Design and is now known as the Government College of Fine Arts. The industrial section for "useful arts" was started on June 1, 1851. Archibald Cole from the Marlborough House School of Design came to take charge of the industrial section around 1859 but he died in 1860. In a letter to W.J. Hooker in 1854, Hunter mentions plans to have numerous divisions including one for chemical analysis and to have an expansive library. He expected his plan to be opposed by Edward Balfour and others. Cleghorn employed two Madras School of Art students, Mooregasan Moodeliar and T. Rungasawmy, for copying botanical illustrations for his publications from August 1852. Hunter collaborated with George Wilson, the director of the Industrial Museum in Edinburgh. Hunter also promoted the idea that the British government start more art schools, referring to the moral duty of the British to direct Indian abilities "into some of the best and purest channels of study". Hunter published a journal called Indian Journal of Art, Science. and Manufacture with eight issues between 1850–51 and four in 1856. This included descriptions of fossils by Hunter. He also had two issues of Illustrated Indian Journal of Arts (1851) that included lessons and drawings meant to be copied and used for practice.

Following the Great Exhibition of 1851 where numerous produce from Hunter's establishment were exhibited, he noted some of the problems involved in craft production in India such as the need to pay in advance. He also noted how Indian products were often superior and more durable than that which was produced and sold cheaply in Britain. In 1855, Hunter was involved in the organization of the Madras Exhibition as part of an eight-member committee was headed by Lord Harris. He was in-charge of arrangement and was also on a subcommittee on machinery, manufactures sculpture, models and "plastic art" and jury for several classes of exhibits. He was also a recipient of a silver medal for service on the committee.

Hunter was also a pioneer of photography. In 1852 he had Frederick Fiebig who was visiting to talk to his students about the Talbot-type process and hired the services of Linnaeus Tripe in 1856 while also founding the Madras Photographic Society. One of Tripe's assistants C. Iyahsawmy Pillay continued to train students in photography. The photographic society however declined into inactivity by 1861. Hunter retired in 1873 as Surgeon Major.

== Family ==
Hunter married Jane Mary daughter of Captain John Wogan Patton on 4 April 1843 at Calcutta. They had three daughters and four sons-Jane Mary (1844-1899), Richard born in 1846 in Bellary (died 1867, Mercara), Margaret Selina (1849), John Robert (1851-1902), Isabella Harriet (b. 1855), Alexander Toynbee born aboard the ship Gloriana on 20 July 1858, and James George Alured (b. 1864). Margaret Selina married Robert Bell Nixon, a freight broker of Bombay and had a son, physician John Alexander Nixon (1874-1951). An older brother Robert (14 November 1814 – 19 December 1890) worked as manager of the Bank of Madras and then the Agra Bank in Edinburgh.
