= Willoughby Wallace Hooper =

English military photographer

- Born: 4 February 1837; Kennington
- Died: 21 April 1912; Kilmington
- Occupation: Military photographer
- Known for: ethnographic photographs of native people in colonial India and Burma
- Notable work: The People of India (1868–1875), Burmah: a series of one hundred photographs 1887

Willoughby Wallace Hooper (1837 in Kennington, south London – 21 April 1912 in Kilmington near Axminster, England) was an English military officer and photographer, serving for near to forty years in the colonial army in southern India and British-Burma during the second half of the 19th century.

He is known for his photographs of ethnic groups, military and domestic scenes from the 1860s onwards. Among other photographers, he contributed to the ethnographic survey The People of India (8 vols, 1868–75). His photographs of victims of the Madras famine of 1876-8 and of Burmese prisoners facing execution by a firing squad have raised concerns about the ethical behaviour of photographers during his lifetime, as well as later on.

== Life and work ==
After finishing school in Ramsgate, Hooper took up a position in 1853 as secretary at East India House. In 1858, he was commissioned into the 7th Madras Light Cavalry and subsequently seconded from his military duties in order to produce ethnographic photographs in the Central Provinces of British India and later, in British Burma. A self-trained and enthusiastic photographer, Hooper contributed over 450 photographic plates of native Indian people to the eight volumes of the ethnographic publication The People of India, published from 1868 until 1875. In a letter to the Chief Commissioner of the Central Provinces of British India of November 1862, he reported about the circumstances of taking photographs of a remote hill tribe: "The photographs which I took of them, I had the greatest difficulty in procuring, as having never seen a European before, they were naturally very much alarmed, more specially as it was very difficult to make them understand what I was doing with them."

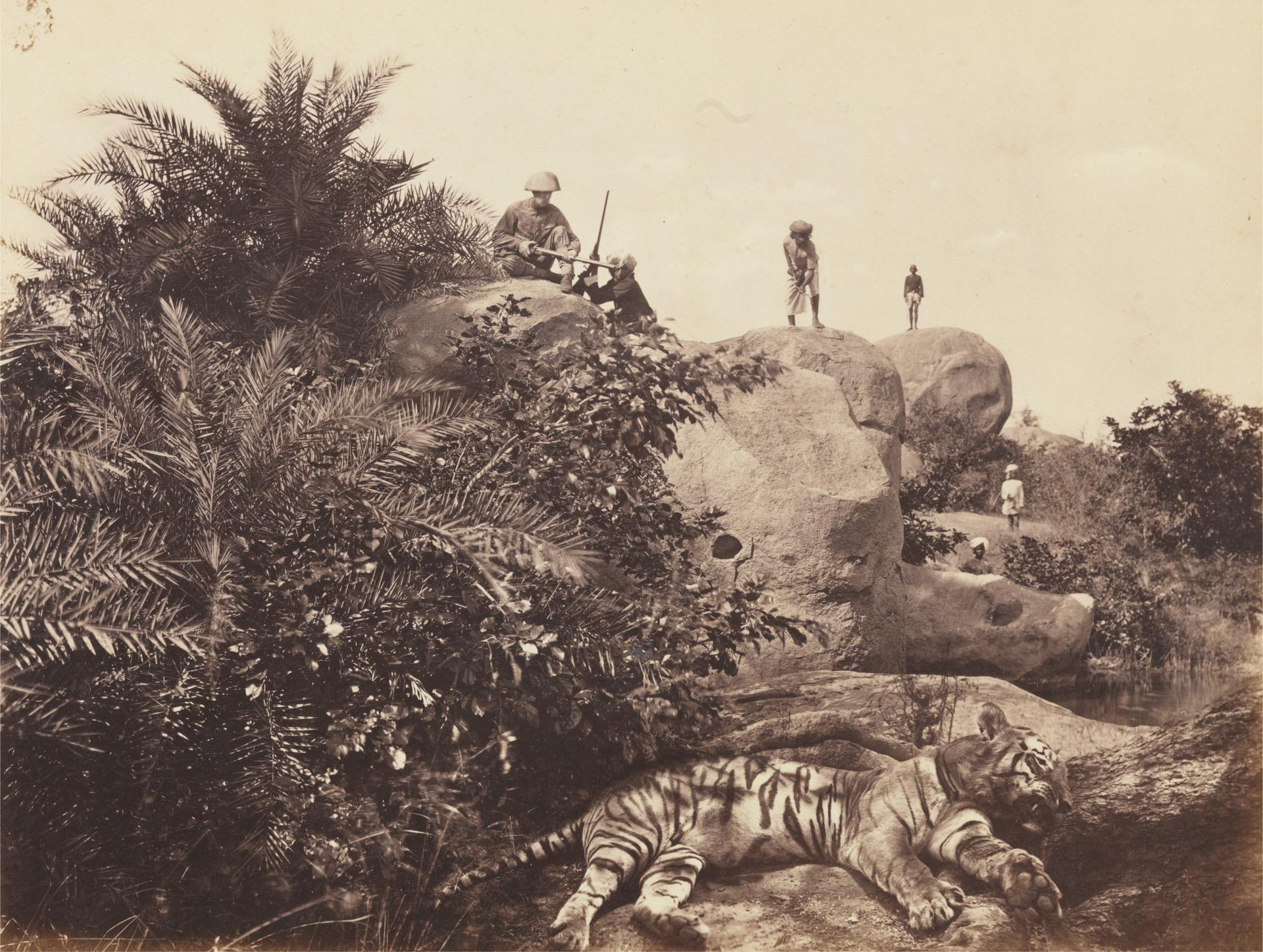
The Tiger Hunt, ca. 1872

Around 1872, he published a series of staged photographs titled "Tiger Shooting", which he sold to hunters as proof and souvenirs, and edited again in 1887 as Lantern readings: Tiger shooting in India.

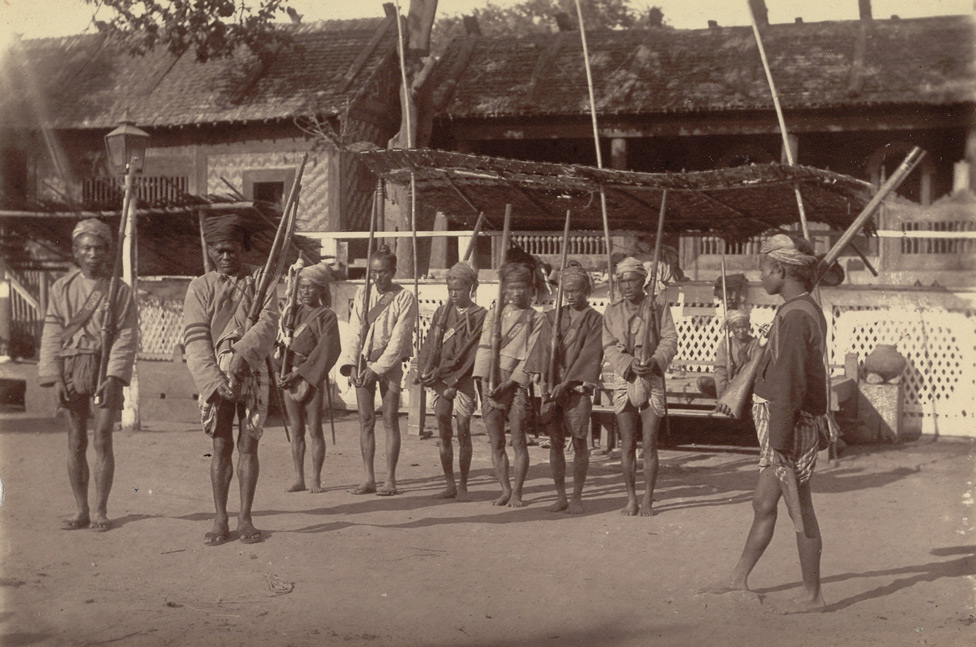
A Burmese police guard at Mandalay

In 1885, he participated as Provost Marshal in the Third Anglo-Burmese War, which led to the end of the last Burmese monarchy under King Thibaw and to the establishment of British rule all over the country. Hoopers photographs of the fighting during this war are considered as “one of the most accomplished and comprehensive records of a nineteenth-century military campaign”. They were published in 1887 as ‘Burmah: a series of one hundred photographs illustrating incidents connected with the British Expeditionary Force to that country, from the embarkation at Madras, 1st Nov, 1885, to the capture of King Theebaw, with many views of Mandalay and surrounding country, native life and industries’. There were two editions, one with albumen prints, one with autotypes, and a set of lantern slides was issued.

In 1896, Hooper retired from military service in the grade of colonel and lived in England until his death in 1912. – A number of his photographs are collected in the archives of the British Museum and the J. Paul Getty Museum.

=== Controversies ===
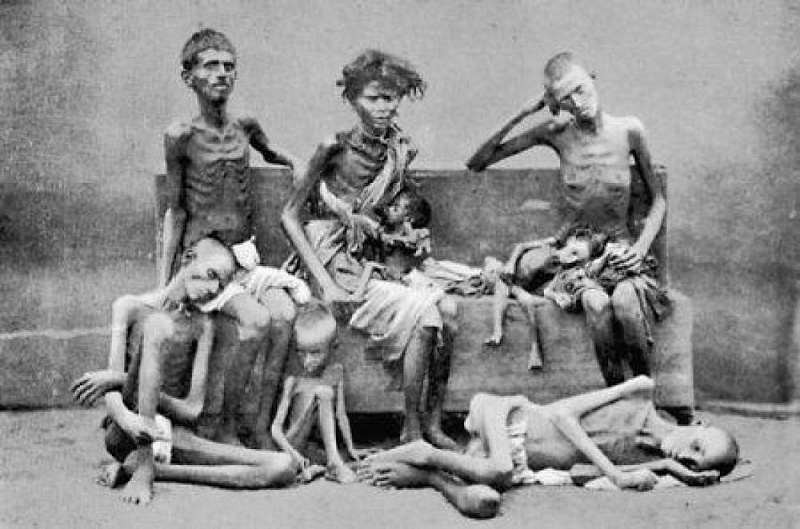
Inmates of a relief camp during the Madras famine, 1876-1878

Around 1878, Hooper had taken a series of arranged photographs showing emaciated bodies of men, women and children, who were among the millions of victims of the Madras Famine. Having been published in Britain under the title Secundarabad, and with captions such as "Deserving Objects of Gratuitous Relief", they were caricatured by the satirical magazine Punch, criticizing Hooper for not having given any help to the people he was about to depict. In 2021, articles in the journal History of Photography and the Indian magazine Scroll.in, cited these pictorial documents of atrocities as historical examples for questions about the photographer's ethical responsibility and their effects on the general public.

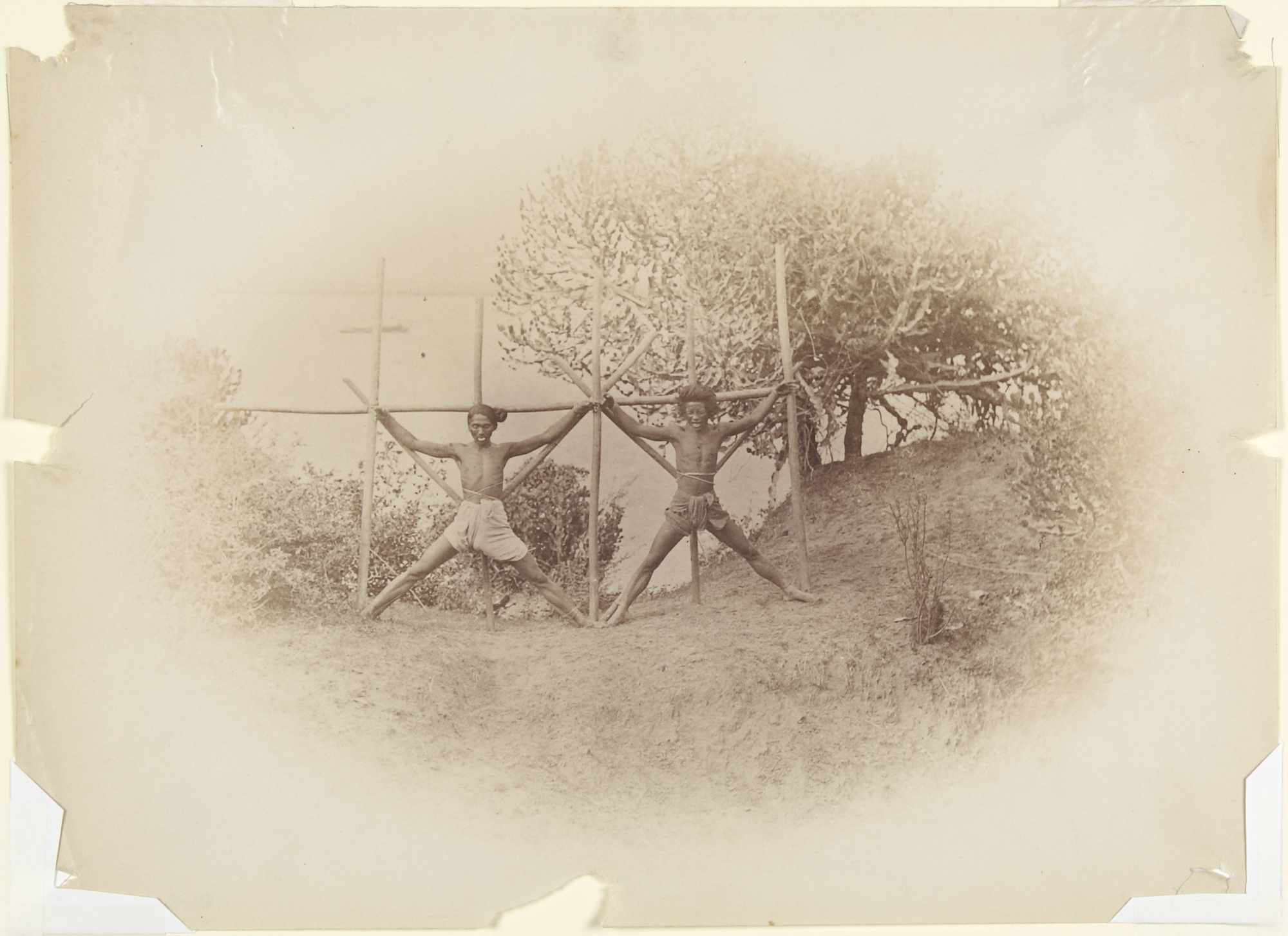
Burmese prisoners readied for execution, 1880s

Some of his pictures showing the execution of Burmese prisoners became notable for the investigation following allegations that Hooper had them treated cruelly and inhumanely by delaying the firing squad for the time necessary to take the photographs. The subsequent court of inquiry concluded that he had behaved in a “callous and indecorous” way, and his pay was temporarily reduced. Shortly afterwards, the affair also raised issues over the ethical role of the photographer in documenting human suffering and the moral justification of carrying out executions against "a conquered people".

In a more general sense, contemporary art historian Ariella Aïsha Azoulay wrote in her article The Captive Photograph: "Photographs taken under circumstances of violence are not reducible to what is recorded in them, since the violence that enabled their creation does not disappear after the camera’s shutter clicks."

== See also ==
Other notable photographers of 19th-century Burma:

- John McCosh
- Felice Beato
- Linnaeus Tripe
- Philip Adolphe Klier
- Max Henry Ferrars
