= Elizabeth Ferrars =

British writer (1907–1995)

- Born: Morna Doris MacTaggart; 6 September 1907; Rangoon, British Burma
- Died: 30 March 1995 (aged 87); Blewbury, Oxfordshire, England
- Citizenship: United Kingdom
- Education: Bedales School; University of London (Diploma in Journalism)
- Occupation: Novelist
- Years active: 1932–1995
- Known for: Crime fiction; Toby Dyke, Virginia and Felix Freer, Andrew Basnett series
- Notable work: Give a Corpse a Bad Name; The Sugar Wife; A Thief in the Night
- Spouse(s): Alan G. Staniland (first husband); Robert Brown (second husband)
- Relatives: Peter MacTaggart (nephew)
- Awards: Founding member and Chairperson, Crime Writers' Association

Elizabeth Ferrars (6 September 1907 – 30 March 1995), born Morna Doris MacTaggart, was a British crime writer. During more than 50 years of writing, she wrote more than 70 novels.

== Life and work ==
Morna MacTaggart was born the fifth child of Peter Clouston and Marie MacTaggart (née Ferrars) in Rangoon (currently Yangon), during British rule in Burma. Her father worked for Bullock Brothers, a Scottish timber and rice-trading company. Her maternal grandparents where the Irish-German couple Max Henry and Bertha Ferrars, who had taken residence in Freiburg, southern Germany, after having lived and worked in Burma for many years until 1896. At an early age, the MacTaggarts sent each of their children for schooling to live with their grandparents in Freiburg. There, Morna grew up speaking both English and German during her early years of schooling.

The deteriorating political climate between Britain and Germany before World War I led to her family sending her to England. There, she attended the non-denominational Bedales School from 1918 to 1924. She claimed in later years that she never would have been able to write crime novels if she had not learned German as a child, the rigorous sentence structure and complex rules of grammar being an indispensable preparation for the architecture of a crime thriller. Unable to study English Literature, because she was never taught Latin or Greek, she took a diploma in journalism at London University (1925–1928), and wrote two first novels under her own name in the early 1930s. It was at this time that she met and married her first husband, Alan G. Staniland, who had a keen interest in contemporary literature, owned a first edition of T. S. Eliot's The Waste Land, and was a talented amateur water colorist.

Around 1940, she met a lecturer in Botany at Bedford College, Dr (later Professor) Robert Brown, (1908-1995) and the same year her first crime novel, Give a Corpse a Bad Name, was published. She separated from her first husband and lived with Robert Brown in Belsize Park, London, from 1942. However, she did not obtain a divorce and marry Brown until October 1945. She remained on friendly terms with her first husband, who also remarried. In 1951 she and her new husband moved to Cornell University in the USA, where her husband had been offered a post. Notwithstanding the financial attraction of such a posting in austerity postwar Britain, they returned a year later owing to the atmosphere of McCarthyism. Having seen the rise of fascism in Europe, they were disturbed by the "witch-hunts" against many writers and academics accused of communist sympathies. In 1953, she became one of the founding members of the Crime Writers' Association, for which she served as chairperson in 1977. In 1958, she became a member of the famed Detection Club.

From 1957, when her husband was appointed Regius Professor of Botany at the University of Edinburgh, they lived in Edinburgh until shortly after his retirement in 1977. Citing the long, cold winters as a reason, they then moved south to the village of Blewbury in Oxfordshire, where they lived until her sudden death in 1995. She professed no religious faith and was probably instrumental in turning her husband from distinct evangelism in the 1930s towards agnosticism. She was buried in Blewbury in a non-religious ceremony. Her final novel, A Thief in the Night, was published posthumously in 1995. She was survived by a nephew, Peter MacTaggart, who holds the copyright of her novels. In the United States, her novels were published under the name E.X. Ferrars, her US publishers assuring her that "the 'X' would 'do it'".

Though the majority of Ferrars's works are standalone novels, she also wrote several series. Her first five novels all feature Toby Dyke, a freelance journalist, and his companion, George, who uses several surnames and is implied to be a former criminal. Late in her career, she began writing about a semi-estranged married couple, Virginia and Felix Freer, and a retired botanist, Andrew Basnett. Several of her short stories also feature an elderly detective called Jonas P. Jonas.

Her extraordinary output owes a great deal to considerable self-discipline and diligent method. Her plots were worked out in detail in hand-written notebooks before being filled out in typed manuscript; she said that they were worked backwards from the denouement. She based characters and situations on people she knew and things she had seen in real life. She travelled with her husband when his academic career required, for example to Adelaide where he was a visiting professor at the University of South Australia, and on holidays, especially to Madeira, which they loved.

Her books are written so that readers are spared from violence or extreme unpleasantness. Due to their backgrounds, her characters do not expect crime or violence to impinge on their lives. They are educated, and often work in academic or artistic fields. Female characters are independent and "politely feminist."

== Bibliography ==
As Morna MacTaggart

- Turn Single (1932)
- Broken Music (1934)

Toby Dyke series

- Give a Corpse a Bad Name (1940)
- Remove the Bodies (1941) (published in the US as Rehearsals for Murder)
- Death in Botanist's Bay (1941) (published in the US as Murder of a Suicide)
- Don't Monkey with Murder (1942) (published in the US as The Shape of a Stain)
- Your Neck in a Noose (1942) (published in the US as Neck in a Noose)

Virginia and Felix Freer series

- Last Will and Testament (1978)
- Frog in the Throat (1980)
- Thinner Than Water (1981)
- Death of a Minor Character (1983)
- I Met Murder (1985)
- Woman Slaughter (1989)
- Sleep of the Unjust (1990)
- Beware of the Dog (1992)

Andrew Basnett series

- Something Wicked (1983)
- The Root of All Evil (1984)
- The Crime and the Crystal (1985)
- The Other Devil's Name (1986)
- A Murder Too Many (1988)
- Smoke Without Fire (1990)
- A Hobby of Murder (1994)
- A Choice of Evils (1995)

Other novels

- I, Said The Fly (1945)
- Murder among Friends (1946) (published in the US as Cheat the Hangman)
- With Murder in Mind (1948)
- The March Hare Murders (1949)
- Milk of Human Kindness (1950)
- Hunt the Tortoise (1950)
- The Clock that Wouldn't Stop (1952)
- Alibi for a Witch (1952)
- Murder in Time (1953)
- The Lying Voices (1954)
- Enough to Kill a Horse (1955)
- Always Say Die (1956) (published in the US as We Haven't Seen Her Lately; see Media Adaptations)
- Murder Moves In (1956) (published in the US as Kill or Cure)
- Furnished for Murder (1957)
- Unreasonable Doubt (1958) (published in the US as Count the Cost)
- A Tale of Two Murders (1959) (published in the US as Depart This Life)
- Fear the Light (1960)
- Sleeping Dogs (1960)
- The Wandering Widows (1962)
- The Busy Body (1962) (published in the US as Seeing Double)
- The Doubly Dead (1963)
- A Legal Fiction (1964) (published in the US as The Decayed Gentlewoman)
- Ninth Life (1965)
- No Peace for the Wicked (1965)
- Zero at the Bone (1967)
- The Swaying Pillars (1968)
- Skeleton Staff (1969)
- The Seven Sleepers (1970)
- A Stranger and Afraid (1971)
- Breath of Suspicion (1972)
- The Small World of Murder (1973)
- Foot in the Grave (1973)
- Hanged Man's House (1974)
- Alive and Dead (1974)
- Drowned Rat (1975)
- The Cup and the Lip (1975)
- Blood Flies Upwards (1976)
- Pretty Pink Shroud (1977)
- Murders Anonymous (1977)
- In at the Kill (1978)
- Witness Before the Fact (1979)
- Experiment with Death (1981)
- Skeleton in Search of a Cupboard (1982) (published in the US as Skeleton in Search of a Closet)
- Come and Be Killed (1987)
- Trial by Fury (1989)
- Danger from the Dead (1991)
- Answer Came There None (1992)
- Thy Brother Death (1993)
- Seeing Is Believing (1994)
- A Thief in the Night (1995)

Short story compilations

- Designs on Life (1980)
- Sequence of Events (1989)
- The Casebook of Jonas P. Jonas and Other Mysteries (Crippen & Landru, 2012)

Short stories

- Drawn into Error (1963, published in the 4th Bedtime Mystery Book)
- Instrument of Justice (1986, published in the Best of Winter's Crimes)

Articles

- "No Danger to Detectives!" (Reply to sci-fi author John Wyndham's "Roar of the Rockets."), John O'London's Weekly 9 April 1954.

Other

- Introduction, Planned Departures: A Crime Writers Association Anthology (Hodder & Stoughton, 1958)

== Media adaptations ==
- "We Haven't Seen Her Lately," adapted from the novel by E. X. Ferrars and starring George C. Scott, Kraft Television Theatre (Aug. 1958)
