= Linnaeus Tripe =

British early photographer (1822–1902)

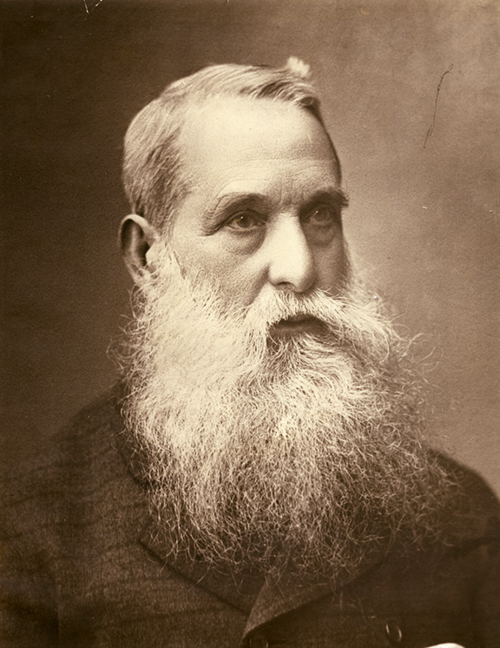
Linnaeus Tripe c. 1880s

Linnaeus Tripe (14 April 1822 – 2 March 1902) was a British pioneer of photography, best known for his photographs of India and Burma taken in the 1850s.

== Early life ==
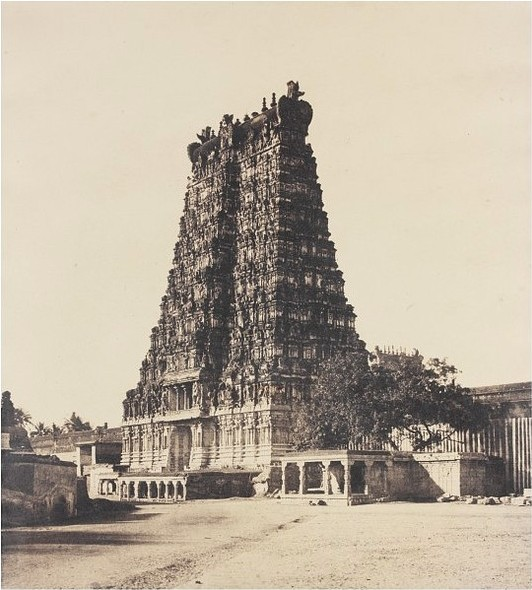
The East Gopuram of the Great Pagoda (Meenakshi Temple, Madurai) from the album 'Photographs of Madura: Part III', 1858, Linnaeus Tripe V&A Museum no. IS.40:2–1889

Linnaeus Tripe was born on 14 April 1822, in Plymouth Dock (now Devonport), Devon, to Mary (1786–1842) and Cornelius (1785–1860). He was the ninth of twelve children. He joined the East India Company army in 1838, and in 1840, became a lieutenant based in the south of India. He returned to England in 1850, on a leave that was extended due to ill health until 1854. During this time he began to experiment with photography, and joined the Photographic Society of London in 1853. He returned to Bangalore, India, as a captain in June 1854. In December of that year he made his first photographs of India. In February of the following year he took part in the Madras Exhibition of Raw Products, Arts, and Manufactures of Southern India, displaying 68 photographs of previously unphotographed temples. The jury declared these photographs the "Best series of photographic views on paper." He won a gold medal for his series of calotypes, illustrating Burmese architecture and ornament.

A further comment in the jury report noted the artistic qualities in Tripe's works:

"...it would be supposed from the nature of Photography that all pictures executed by its means must possess a similarity of style; it is however a curious fact, that this is not the case, the works by one operator being perfectly distinct in character from those by another, even when the same description of apparatus and the same process has been used; this may be observed, when two pictures have been taken by different exhibitors from the same view — the best Indian Photographs in the Exhibition, those by Capt. Tripe and Capt. Greenlaw, exemplify this in a marked manner. The views by Capt. Tripe excel in finish and delicacy — those by Capt. Greenlaw in boldness, freedom and effect, the former are perhaps the best photographs, but the latter are the best pictures. The Calotypes taken in Burmah and exhibited by Capt. Tripe are excellent; remarkable for great distinctness and also for their unusual and beautiful tint. When all are so excellent it is difficult to particularize any as especially worthy of notice."

== Burma ==
After the second of the Anglo-Burmese wars a British mission in 1855 attempted to persuade the Burmese king, Mindon Min to ratify a treaty transferring Pegu to British rule. The mission was led by Major Arthur Phayre, with Henry Yule as the secretary. Photography was becoming the preferred medium for creating a visual record for reasons of economy and accuracy. Tripe - already known as a photographer from his time in India, was chosen by Lord Dalhousie to accompany an official expedition to Ava, Burma, to obtain representations of scenes and buildings. This visit resulted in the publication of Views of Burma. The Indian government requested that 50 sets of prints be produced and 20 were requisitioned by the Court of Directors of the East India Company. Of these, 7 complete sets are held in galleries, libraries and museums. Tripe returned to India and spent nearly two years printing the photographs, including painstaking retouching of clouds and skies, introducing an aesthetic quality into the documentary purpose.

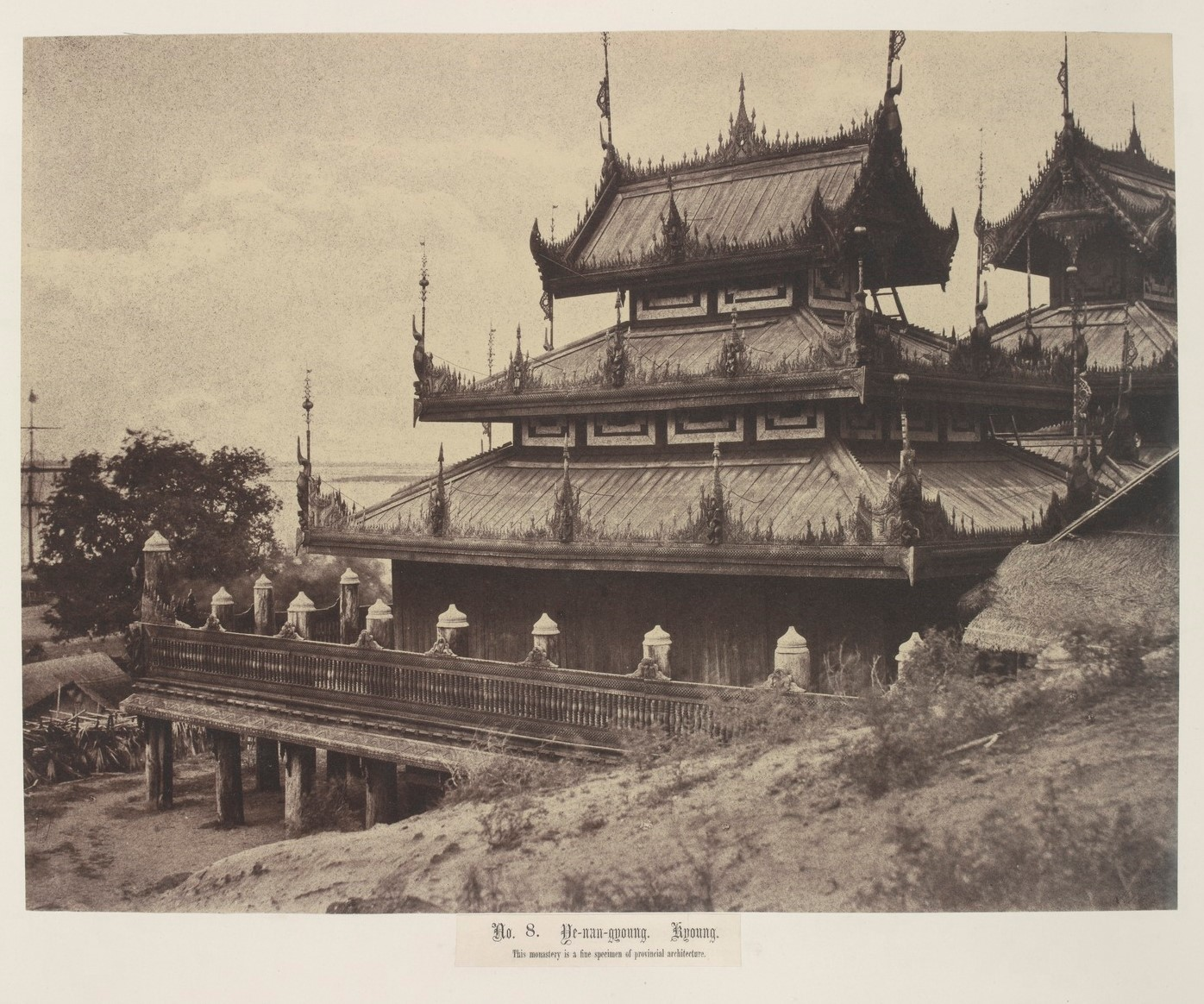
Ye-nan-gyoung monastery. Kyoung, Burma (Myanmar). Views of Burma, No.8. State Library Victoria, Melbourne, Australia. H98.41/8

== Madras ==
In March 1857, Tripe became official photographer to the Madras government, taking photographs of objects shown at the Madras exhibition and portraits of Madras residents. In 1858, he took photographs of subjects of architectural or antiquarian interest, and pictures useful from a practical, engineering perspective. He exhibited 50 photographs from this tour in the annual exhibition of the Photographic Society of Madras in 1859. In March 1862, a series of his photographs were exhibited by Professor Archer at a meeting of the Photographic Society showing Poodoocotah (Pudukottai), Madura (Madurai), Ruakotta, Seringham (Srirangam), the Elliot Marbles, &c., &c. These photographs are now in the British Library.

His photos of the "Elliot Marbles", that is, sculpture removed to Madras from the Amaravati Stupa by Sir Walter Elliott remain of special interest to scholars, as some of the sculptures are now damaged or missing. The rest are now divided between the Government Museum, Chennai and the British Museum, as the Amaravati Marbles.

Following the Indian Rebellion of 1857, control of India went to the British Crown, and in June 1859 Tripe was ordered not to undertake any new work. At the end of that year he was told to close the business and sell off the equipment. One of his assistants, C. Iyahswamy, also became a talented photographer.

== Return to the army ==
In 1863, Tripe returned to the army and was continually promoted, becoming colonel in August 1873. Whilst in Lower Burma in February 1869 he made his two final series of photographs. Here he took photographs of landscapes made on glass negatives. Tripe left India in 1873 and retired from the Army in April 1874. He died in Devonport on 2 March 1902.

== See also ==
Other important photographers of the 19th century in Burma:

- John McCosh
- Willoughby Wallace Hooper
- Felice Beato
- Philip Adolphe Klier
- Max Henry Ferrars
