= Yoke thé =

Marionette puppetry of Myanmar

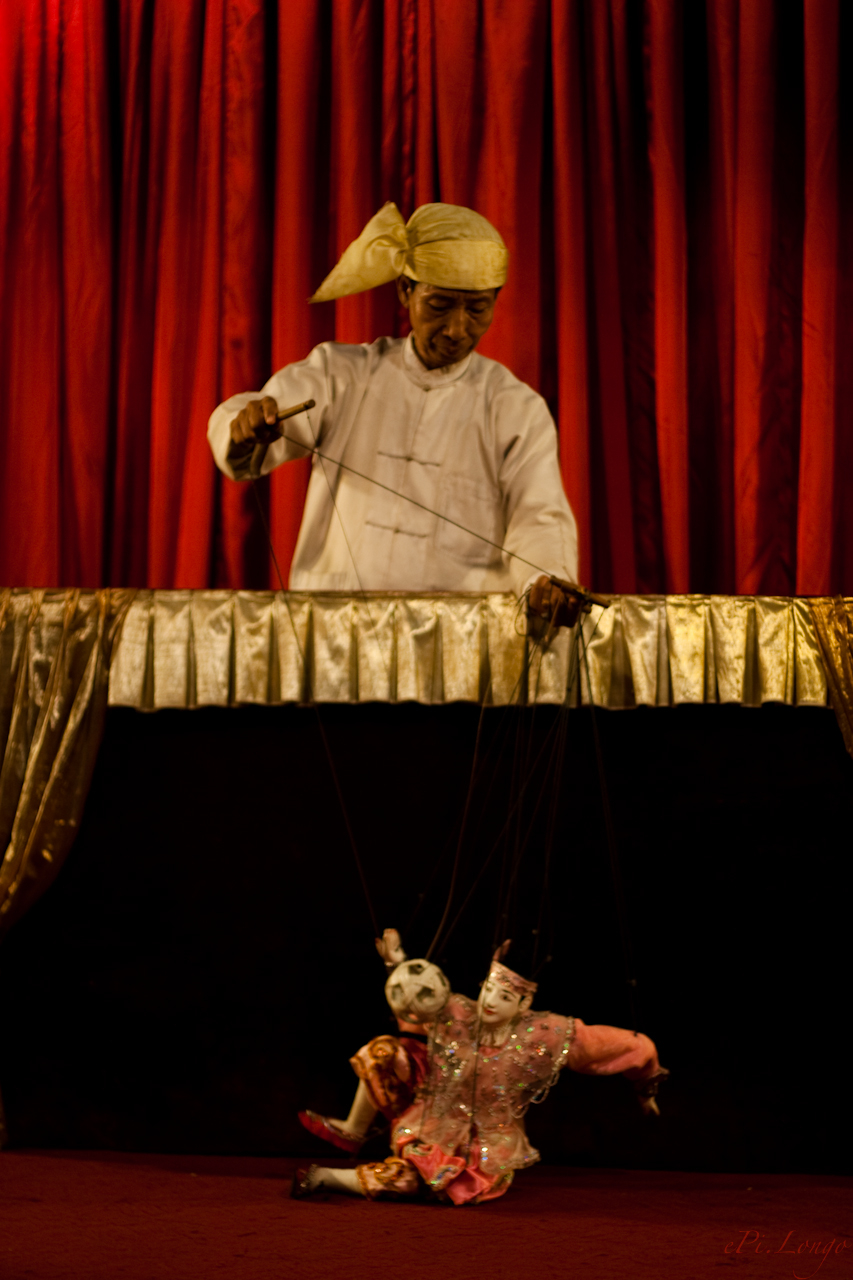
Yoke thé and puppet master

Yoke thé (Burmese: ရုပ်သေး, MLCTS: rupse:, IPA: [joʊʔ θé], literally "miniatures") is the Burmese name for marionette puppetry. Although the term can be used for puppetry in general, its usage usually refers to the local form of string puppetry. Like most of Burmese refined art, yoke thé performances originated from royal patronage and were gradually adapted for the wider populace. Yoke thé are almost always performed in the form of Burmese operas.

Burmese marionettes are very intricate and their use requires dexterous skills, as they employ 18 or 19 wires for male and female characters respectively, and each puppet is controlled by only one puppeteer.

== History ==
The probable date of the origin of Burmese marionettes is given as around 1780, during the reign of Singu Min, and their introduction is credited to the Minister of Royal Entertainment, U Thaw. From their inception, marionettes enjoyed great popularity in the courts of the Konbaung dynasty. Little has changed since the creation of the art by U Thaw, and the set of characters developed by him is still in use today. Until the conquest of Upper Burma by the British in late 1885 during the Third Anglo-Burmese War, yoke thé troupes thrived under royal patronage.

== List of characters ==
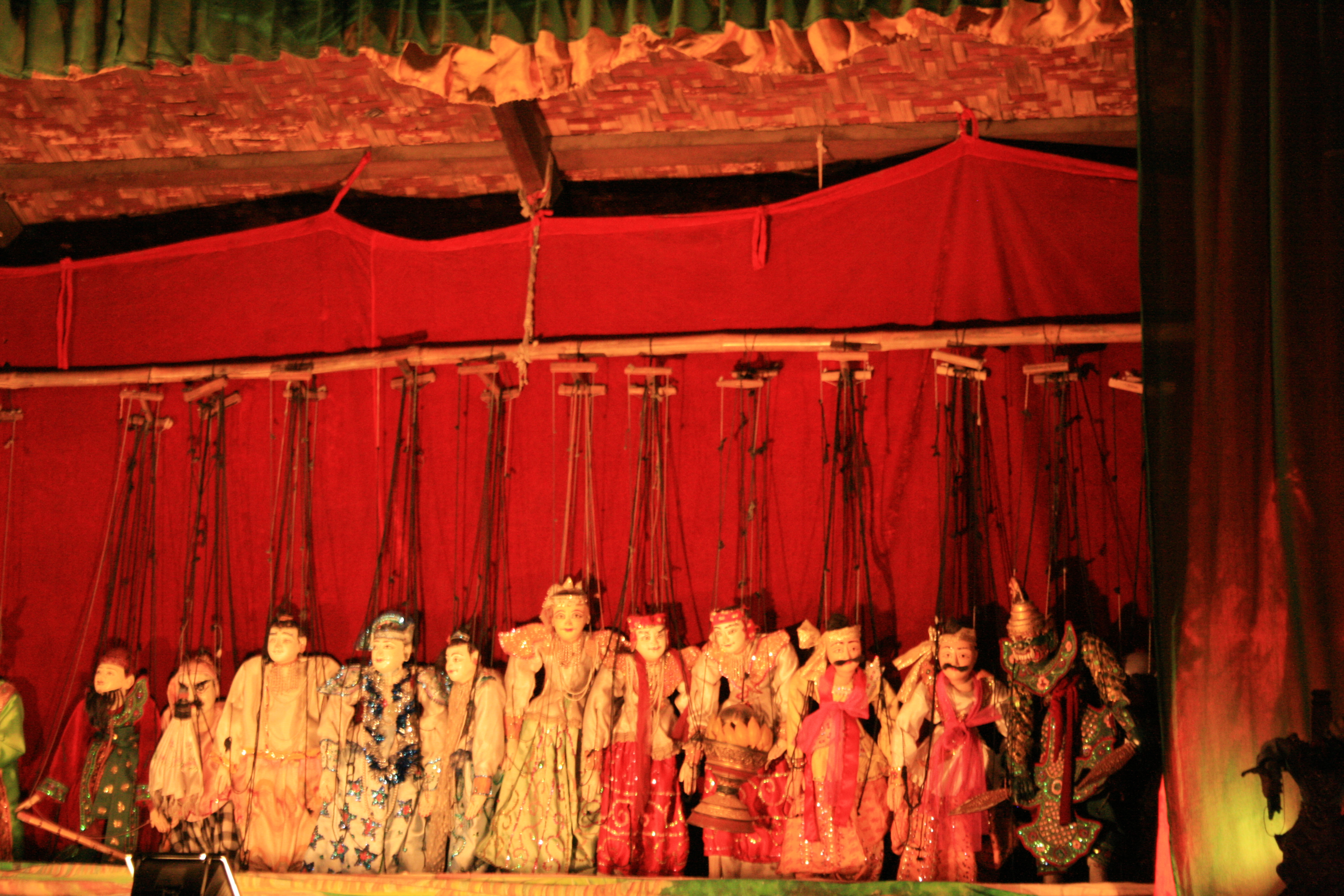
Yoke thé troupe in Bagan, May 2010

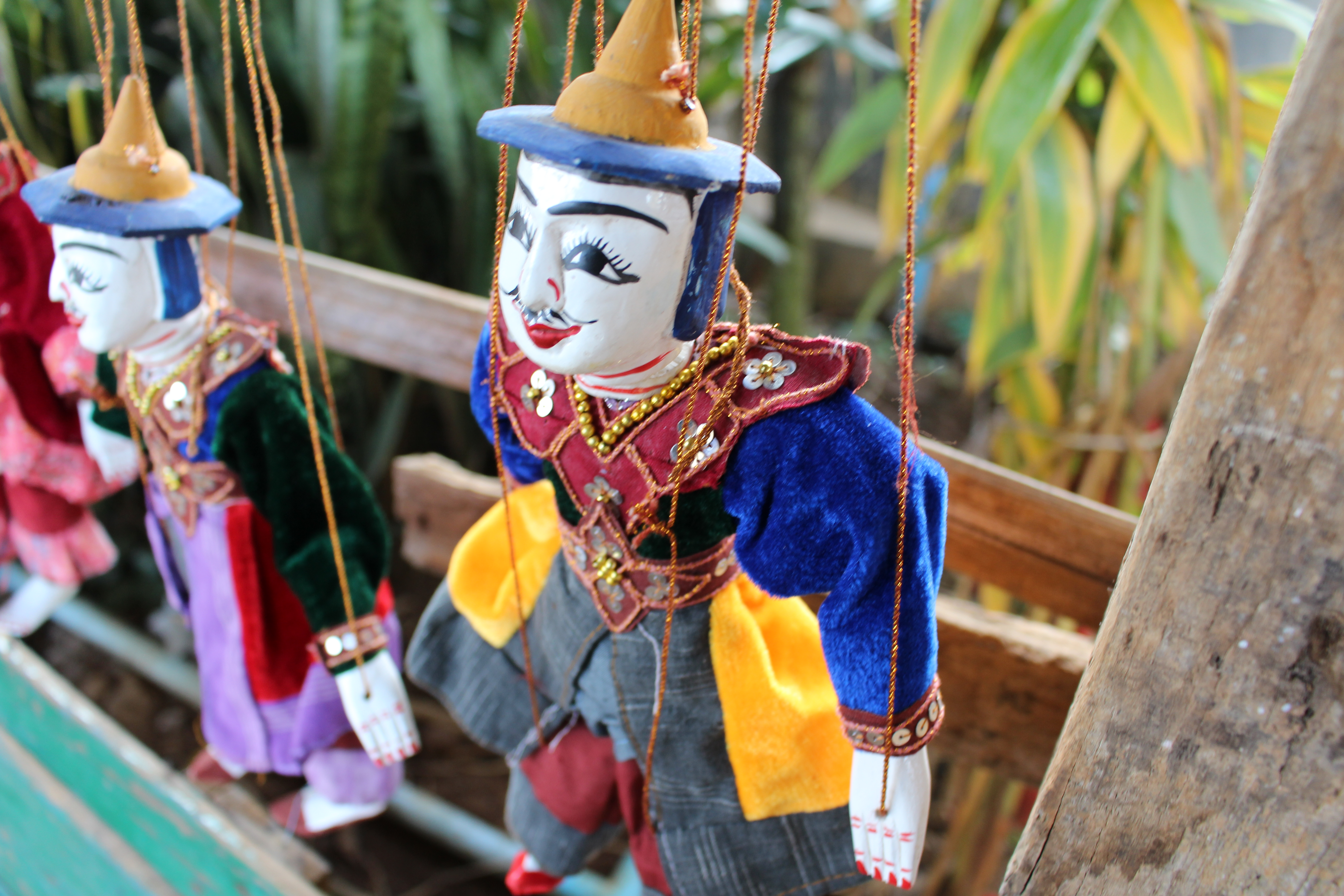
Traditional Burmese Commander-in-chief Marionette

A Burmese marionette troupe has 27 character figures.

- Nat votaress (နတ်ကတော်ရုပ်, Nat Kadaw) – two figures
- Horse (မြင်း,Myin) – one figure
- Elephant (ဆင်, Hsin) – two figures (one white, one black)
- Tiger (ကျား, Kyar) – one figure
- Monkey (Myauk) – one figure
- Parrot (Thalika) – two figures
- Alchemist (ဇော်ဂျီ, Zawgyi) – one figure
- Minister (Wungyi) – four figures
- King (Mintayar gyi) – one figure
- Prince (မင်းသား, Minthar) – one figure
- Princess (မင်းသမီး, Minthami) – one figure
- Prince Regent (Uparaja or Ain-shei-Minthar) – two figures (one white-faced, one red-faced)
- Brahmin (ပုဏ္ဏား, Ponenar) – one figure
- Hermit (Yathei) – one figure
- Nat (နတ်, Nat) – one figure
- Deva (Maha Deiwa) – one figure
- Old man (Apho-O) – one figure
- Old woman (Aphwa-O) – one figure
- Buffoon (Lu phyet) – two figures

== Music ==
A traditional Burmese orchestra known as a hsaing waing usually provides the music. The puppeteers themselves often provide the voices of the characters.

== Political role ==
The Burmese court was concerned with preserving the dignity of its members, and marionettes were often used to preserve the esteem of persons who had erred. The king could reprimand his children or his wife in this way by asking the puppeteers to put on a parable warning errant children or careless wives about their reckless ways. While the reprimand would be obvious to anyone who was in the know, it would largely pass unheeded by the people looking on, something that had a great deal of value in a court that could, and did, contain hundreds of people.

Burmese marionettes also served as a conduit between the ruler and his subjects. Many times, people would ask the puppeteers to mention a current event or warning to the ruler in a veiled fashion. Thus, information or popular discontent could be passed on without any disrespect, as marionettes could say things that a human could be punished for with death.

== Decline and revival ==
Yoke thé troupes, like most artisans in pre-colonial Burma alongside the Sangha, enjoyed great royal patronage. However, like most forms of traditional arts, patronage vanished upon the colonisation of Upper Burma by the British in November 1885, following the Third Anglo-Burmese War.

In the late 1990s, General Khin Nyunt of the ruling junta lent official support to marionette actors and troupes, thus reviving a rapidly dying tradition. Nowadays, marionettes are very common as tourist attractions and also amongst the populace, and they have resumed their role of relatively safe political satire reflecting popular discontent.

Also, a new genre of yoke thé is emerging, where a character and a real life actor perform the same show, usually with the yoke thé puppets able to mimic and sometimes out-perform their human counterparts.
