= Javier Viver =

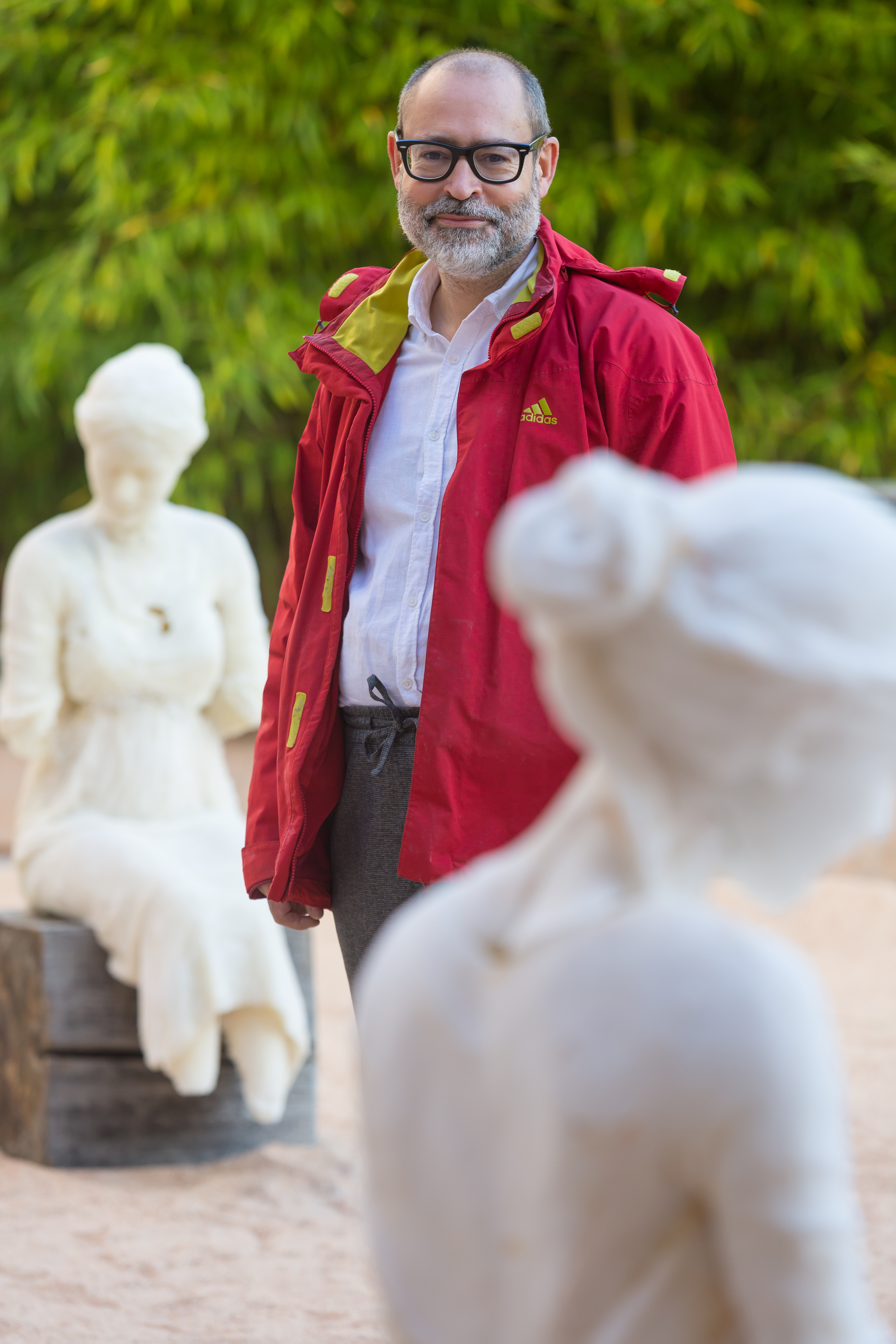
Spanish sculptor, photographer, designer and photobook editor; Javier Viver.

Javier Viver (born 1971 in Madrid) is a sculptor, photographer, designer and editor of photobooks. His work proposes a debate between the iconography and the inconoclasty as means of the invisible apparition.

In 2015 publishes, with the editorial RM, the photobook Révélations about the iconography of Salpêtrière (Paris, 1875-1918). This book was favourably reviewed and various prizes like the first prize for The Best Book of Art 2015 awarded by the Spanish Ministry of Culture, Education and Sport and the prize Ars Libris Barcelona (International Fair of Contemporary Edition). In 2016 it is nominated for the Best Photobook in the Fotobookfestival of Kassel and is selected for the Prize PhotoEspaña for The Best Book of Photography 2016.

In 2006 makes the series The Celebrities, a project about Narcissus and the loss of the face, which becomes the prize «Generaciones 2007».

In 2005 designs the installation The Audience, an analogy of the play El gran teatro del mundo by Calderón de la Barca.

His work Sic transit (2004), where photography and cinematography join together, won the I Prize Plastics Arts of Madrid.

Between 2001 and 2003 he works in ESpHeM, a fictitious company which offer temporary systems of packaging to live in the world. It was very good received by the critics and was rewarded with three prizes awarded by the Spanish Ministry or Foreign Affairs, the Spanish Fine Arts Circle and the Botin Foundation.

== Biography ==
He makes the degree of Fine Arts at the Complutense University of Madrid, where he became Doctor with a research about the Spanish producer José Val del Omar in the PLAT laboratory. The title is Laboratorio Val del Omar, and was published as a documentary by Cameo within the Val del Omar. Elemental de España collection (2010). As a consequence, he received the request of making an installation with Javier Ortiz Echagüe in the Reina Sofía National Museum during the exhibition Desbordamiento Val del Omar.

Viver completes his education with residences in The Spanish Academy of Rome, in Location1 with the «International Residency Program» (New York, 2002-2003), in Hangar (Barcelona, 2002), and in the «ARtist residence project» at The Swatch Art Peace Hotel (Shanghai, 2014).
