= Bella-Veneet =

Finnish boat building company

Bella-Veneet Oy
- Industry: Boat building
- Founded: May 7, 1981; 44 years ago in Kuopio, Finland
- Headquarters: Kuopio, Finland
- Owner: Nimbus Boats Sweden AB
- Number of employees: 314
- Website: www.bellaboats.fi

Bella-Veneet Oy — Bella Boats is a motorboat manufacturer located in Kuopio, Finland. The company is the largest manufacturer of fiberglass motorboats in the Nordic countries. The boats are produced in four factories with a total of 150 employees. Three of the factories are situated in Kuopio, North Savo, and one in Larsmo, Ostrobothnia. Since autumn 2018, the company is owned by the Swedish company Nimbus Boats.

== History ==
In 1970 Raimo Sonninen, founder of Bella Boats, starts his career by building 24 windscreen boats in his own garage. He got the first incentive into the boat building from his hobby, competitive boating. Sonninen sold his self-made catamaran type plywood boat to a South Finnish boat manufacturer and received a windscreen boat mould kit as payment. The first boat immediately succeeded so well that a neighbour wanted to buy it. This was the beginning of the manufacturing of Bella boats for sale. The company started its action in Iisalmi, and from 1972 onwards operations continued in Kuopio.

=== 1980s ===
In 1985, Bella Boats opens a new factory at Leväsentie 1, Kuopio. Leväsentie 1 was leased from the city as early as 1974, and the manufacture of boats began. A new-build boat factory completed in 1985 at the same address, and it paid for itself in two years.

In 1986, Italian racing driver and boat builder Renato Molinari sells the Falcon day cruiser moulds to Bella and Bella develops a cabin version. In the same year, Sonninen was rewarded with an Entrepreneur Award by the City of Kuopio. Design cooperation was carried out with Molinari, while strengthening cooperation with top Finnish designers Tor Hinders and Sven Lindkvist.

In 1989 the new factory, Väliköntie 10, is completed. The factory has four production lines and at best one boat is completed from each line per day. With the new plant, the number of employees rose from 35 to 80, and Bella Boats ended up training the new employees together with the Employment Office in Kuopio due to the high and rapid need. In total, four courses of half a year in boat building would be organised over two years.

During the 1980s Bella-Boats’ development was steadily growing. Towards the end of the decade, the boats were made in as many as eight factories, two of them own and six by subcontractors. Turnover reached over 70 million Finnish marks in the best years. Between 1987 and 1990, the average sales growth was 39 per cent. Consequently, the biggest competitor on the Finnish market at that time were the old, second-hand Bella boats.

Towards the end of the decade, Bella got its share of the effects of high demand as well; there was no need to sell any boats, answering the phone and writing down the orders was enough. At that time, the company decided to invest in exports. Sweden was a success, so the next target was Central Europe.

The Falcon, designed by Molinari, continued as the flagship of Bella Boats. At the 1989 Oslo boat show, the Bella 640 HT was selected as the winner of the hard top category. The Bella Falcon 35, which became the flagship in the early 1990s, continued the tendency from the previous decade to bring new concepts to the Finnish boat world. However, the expensive yacht failed to find its target audience in the midst of the deepest recession, and only four boats were manufactured. The Falcon 26, on the other hand, proved to be a success; over 1,000 boats were manufactured from 1988 until the 2010s.

=== 1990s ===
The turnover of Bella Boats totalled around 70 million Finnish marks in 1989. However, a record result was achieved the following year, 1990, when turnover reached 74 million Finnish marks. From that point forward, revenue declined as a result of the recession years, but the operation still remained profitable. The strength of Bella Boats was the arrangement of operations in accordance with demand during the difficult years of recession. During the recession years, among the companies that filed for bankruptcy were some that were seeking quick profit but even professionals who had based their business on a healthy foundation. An example of the latter was the selling of Flipper to Bella in 1992.

In 1992, Bella Boats buys the rights, moulds and the brand name of Flipper Boats. In the same year, the first sales office was established in Sweden and Raimo Sonninen was awarded the national entrepreneur award.

The purchase of Flipper, resulting in two of Finland’s biggest boat brands ending under one roof, was a news item in the European boat industry. Bella Boats began to target foreign markets, particularly Central Europe and Japan, where the impact of the recession was less pronounced. In some countries there were more dealers available than needed, and it can be said that the strong share of exports saved the company over the years of recession. On the other hand, it was difficult to increase the Finnish market share anymore, as Bella already held a 50 per cent share of the Finnish market in the category of mid-size boats.

In autumn 1992 Bella Boats employed 70 people, 60 of them in production. The company had at its disposal the most modern production facility in Europe, the design of which was based on lessons from abroad and the services of top industry experts. Major influences were taken from the automotive industry, such as focusing on production lines; raw materials were brought in from the northern end of the factory, and out from the southern end came a boat ready for the world.

At that time there were forty dealers in Finland and Sweden each. Exporting accounted for 60-70 per cent of turnover, which at that time was 40 million Finnish marks. Bella Boats was a peculiar exception of the Finnish depression period, whose survival through difficult times was considered a kind of miracle.

In 1993, Sakari Mattila comes to the picture, and with him Raimo Sonninen develops the Aquador 22, which becomes a success. Bella Boats starts manufacturing Aquador boats in Kuopio in 1994. The first property was also purchased in Helsinki, it was leased to Bella-Marina Oy and 20 per cent remained in the possession of Bella Boats.

In 1994, the boat trade continued its steady recovery from recession. The growth rate was not huge, but the future looked better than it had been in years. Sonninen noted that growth was more restrained than was hoped during the Helsinki boat show, but at the same time he assumed that trade would still grow later in the spring.

Notable was the increased demand for 6-7 metre boats, as during the worst depression years, boats sold were generally under six metres long. According to Sonninen, Finnish companies had had to increase the quality of boats compared to previous years, as internationalisation of trade had improved quality criteria. The depression had also boosted foreign trade as the Finnish market was almost catastrophically dwindled for several boat manufacturers. Most of Bella Boats’ production was sold abroad at that time, in addition to that half of the motorboats sold in Finland were made by Bella. However, in spring 1994, trade in Finland could not be increased, as almost all focus was geared towards the foreign orders.

In the same year, Bella Boats signed a subcontract with OMC for an order of 125 boats. The contract was the first initiative for collaboration with the global company OMC, Bella becoming a subcontractor to one of OMC’s subsidiaries. OMC Finland Oy imported Evinrude and Johnson outboard engines. The subcontract included the three smallest models of the boat brand Ryds, the main production of which was in Sweden. Bella was assigned to produce boats for the Finnish market. The subcontracting order facilitated the managing of the inactive period in the Kuopio plant during the winter season, and Sonninen calculated that at the end of January all four production lines would be fully occupied.

As a result of the depression years, the boating market shrank by more than half between 1990 and 1995. Bella Boats was one of the few winners of the period. In 1995, Sunmar was acquired by Bella. At the Vene 95 boat show, the company set a goal of selling 50 boats, and the goal was achieved. In late winter 1998, Aquador moved its production from Kuopio to Ireland.

In 2000, preparation of a new factory was undertaken at Väliköntie. The factory would employ around 40 people and produce between 500 and 600 motorboats per year. The new employees for the factory Väliköntie 8B, completed in spring 2001, were acquired by organising specific training in cooperation with Savo Vocational College and the Employment Office. After six months of training, the participants moved smoothly to the factory to do the same jobs they had already done in training. In the first phase, 20 people were trained. Annual production at that time was 1500 boats and the main export countries Nordic countries, Germany, the Benelux countries, the UK, Ireland, Switzerland, Austria, Greenland and the Baltic countries.

In 2000, the rights to Aquador are bought back from Mattila and production is transferred from Ireland back to Finland, Kuopio. The 21st century design of Aquador boats was designed by Rolf Eliasson, perhaps the most respected boat designer in the Nordic countries. Product development was observed with interest both in the international press and among dealers and boaters. Sonninen said that attention is paid to small luxurious details in addition to comfort, safety and quality. The goal was to make Aquador the leading brand product in Europe in its class. The third plant in Kuopio, completed around the same time, focused on the production of Aquador boats. The factory was constructed to follow the principles of production lines, and through partitioning the best possible conditions for each stage of work were achieved.

In 2003, Raimo Sonninen sells 36 per cent of the company to Brunswick. Due to the acquisition, Bella Boats achieved sales from new markets such as France and Spain. Previously, the company exported to 14 countries and turnover amounted to 32 million euros, of which about 70 per cent came from exports. The collaboration with Brunswick resulted in additional distribution channels and product development expertise.

In autumn 2005, the magazine Suomen Kuvalehti selected Bella Boats as Finland's best employer company. They explained that the company had invested and recruited significantly outside the metropolitan area and served as an example for small and medium-sized enterprises of how growth builds employment. In addition, Bella's founder Raimo Sonninen was voted Finland's best growth entrepreneur in the 2006 Entrepreneur of the Year competition.

In 2006, cooperation begins with Oy Scan Mould Ab in Yttere.

=== Factory Fire and Development Activities ===
The Särkiniemi factory in Kuopio burned down in August 2006, and over a thousand square metres of production space was partially destroyed. The company had seven factories at the time of the fire. In addition to the factory building, moulds for boat sets were destroyed. After the fire, the company's operations were reassessed, and large-scale development work began. As the first tangible result of the development efforts, the company started operating at a new 3,000-square-metre factory in Siikaniemi, Kuopio. Bella subcontractors and other companies in the sector have also moved into the area.

In spring 2008, Bella Boats announced the construction of a testing, development and training centre in Siikaniemi Marine Park. The construction of the Boat Development Centre envisioned by the company started in the autumn of 2008. At the time, it was estimated that the research centre would cost around 2.5 million euros and employ approximately 10 people directly. Borrowing its concept from the automotive industry, the project had interested partners such as VTT and various engine manufacturers. Furthermore, Savo Vocational College was planning a training programme for boat sellers to operate within the research centre. However, due to the global recession and layoffs at Bella Boats, the project has proceeded on a limited and slower schedule than intended.

On December 20, 2009, Bella was met by fire again. A roof and a 250-square-metre section, where a flooring company operated, were destroyed in a factory hall in Pietarsaari. However, Bella's production facilities suffered only smoke damage. CEO Raimo Sonninen estimated that the fire would cause a production outage of a few days for the boat factory. The factory had produced 28-foot Aquador fiberglass boats with 15 employees.

=== 2008-2010 ===
2008 was marked by an economic recession that shook the boat industry. Sonninen recalls that the Helsinki and Stockholm boat shows were still going well, but in May and June the situation began to freeze. In mid-summer, dealers commented that the trade is stopping, and stocks are full. There was overstock in the market because all manufacturers had increased their production. Bella Boats had to drive down production and lay off staff. In the autumn of 2008, Bella Boats closed six of its factories until January of the following year. 250 employees were laid off.

Only cautious hopes were placed on the 2009 Helsinki boat show. Bella Boats was prepared for fewer sales than usual and that the boats sold would be smaller than usual. Staff layoffs, which began the previous autumn, were estimated to continue until April. A few dozen boats were sold at the Helsinki boat show.

Production was restarted in March 2009. With orders for about 100 boats, part of staff returned to work, and production was estimated to rotate again at full capacity in April. Bella launched nine new boat models. However, the market situation was still difficult, and boats would only be made according to demand. The Finnish Marine Industries Federation Finnboat predicted a 20-30 per cent decline for the market compared to the previous year. However, additional orders were expected from the spring boat shows.

In 2009, turnkey installation and testing line and first turnkey deliveries at Väliköntie 10 factory. Siikaranta test driving harbour starts operating. Bella Boats also acquired the Aquador Center in Koivusaari, Helsinki, which used to be known as Flipper Market and owned by the bankrupt Vator Oy.

After the economic downturn in 2008, the subsequent recovery of Bella Boats was not hindered solely by economic reasons; boat brands also needed an upgrade. The boat shows in 2008 and 2009 taught the company that the boat world had changed, and Bella should change views as well. Lessons were taken by analysing successful boat brands. It was noted that especially Flipper had become a brand with a mediocre image, which would need a strong identity to rise to a higher level. The reforms started by the search of a suitable top designer, and Espen Thorup was chosen. He was given free rein to design a series of 6—9 metre day cruiser boats.

=== 2010s ===
In 2010, boat sales are rising again, but not at the same level as 2007. After the 2008 recession, Bella Boats focused on product development and renewal of boat models.

In winter 2010, the situation in the boat industry looked significantly better than it had been a year earlier, although the pace of record years would not yet be reached in the sales statistics of the Helsinki boat show. The target was set to sell 60 boats at the 2010 Helsinki boat show, while 80 boats had been sold in the best years. Early in the year, some of the employees were still laid off.

In the same year, the newest boat model was the Bella 9000 Hybrid, which ran on both electric and diesel. At a quiet pace, the boat used an electric motor; at speeds of more than six knots, a diesel engine started. At the time, the reception of the boat was attentively waited because while ecological solutions are appreciated by buyers, the batteries made the boat more expensive. Not long after, the boat was excluded from the model range. In spite of everything, it was chosen as the Motorboat of the Year at the Helsinki boat show 2012.

For 2011, Bella Boats was aiming for a turnover of approximately 40—45 million euros, which would mean an increase of approximately 25 per cent compared to the previous year. There were 800 pre-orders for the year. The market was already clearly recovering from the recession years, but the situation was not yet completely normal.

In the autumn of 2011, Bella Boats started development work with all three boat brands, and the aim was to present several new models at the following year's Helsinki boat show. The spring looked promising for the boat trade, but people were still cautious in their purchasing decisions.

In 2012, Nimbus Boats Ab went bankrupt, and Bella Boats was one interested buyer candidate. The deal would have included boat brands Nimbus, Ryds, Paragon Yachts and Storebro. However, the deal did not materialise at the time. If completed, the deal would have increased the employment, especially in Kuopio.

In the same year, Bella Boats acquired six boat models from MV-Marin's boat range with moulds and manufacturing rights. With the purchase, Bella Boats received moulds for the company's boat Access 7, and based on them the Bella 700 Patrol wheelhouse boat was designed and launched in 2013. However, the boat's driveability was desired to be better than with usual wheelhouse boats, so the hull was redesigned under the direction of Espen Thorup, who already did good work with the new Flipper range.

In the autumn of 2013, Bella Boats estimated that more boats would be produced in the beginning season, since dealer stocks were depleted as a result of the warm summer. Annual production of Bella Boats was around 800 boats at the time, and in the early part of the year the company had increased its sales by a fifth compared to the previous year. Although the boating industry was still in decline, Bella's sales share had increased due to product development.

The ease and flexibility of boat maintenance is also important for the consumer, and therefore the supply of such services falls to dealers. In 2013, exports accounted for about 75 per cent of Bella Boats' net sales and the company had over 100 dealers in 25 countries.

In the early 2010s, Bella began a revamp of boat designs that would cover all of the company's three boat brands, Bella, Flipper and Aquador. Espen Thorup was chosen as the designer. He began by renewing the Flipper range, whose first three new generation boats were introduced in 2012. The new Flipper range, which was designed in a couple of years, included ten new boat models. In 2014, first new boats from the Bella range were presented, and later the Aquador range would also be renewed.

In just over a year, seven new boats were added to the Bella range, and at the same time several old models were left out of production. A few of them had only been produced for a couple of years. Rapid renewal had become essential in the boat industry: the same model was no longer kept in production for up to ten years with only minor changes, but changes in trends had become much faster than before.

The renewal of Flipper two years earlier was also completed, and the newest boat in the collection, Flipper 600 ST, was selected as the Motorboat of the year in the category Shuttle and Picnic Boats at the Helsinki boat show 2014. Overall, the revamp of the range was successful, with 43 per cent more Flippers registered in 2014 than one year earlier. At the VeneBåt15 boat show in February 2015, the Bella 600 BR was selected as the Open Motorboat of the Year.

The new Flipper models also received international recognition: the Flipper 600 DC was selected as a finalist in the European Powerboat of the Year competition in the category of boats under 25 feet. In addition, the Flipper 600 SC was nominated for Best of Boats 2014 in the category of pleasure boats. The nominations were a welcome accolade for Finnish industry and products in the world economy of that time and increased the recognition of Finnish production.

Since 2015, close cooperation with Toivalan Metalli. Toivalan Metalli supplies Bella Boats with parts and components. These unique steel and aluminium parts of various sizes are needed in different parts of the boat.

In 2016, Bella's turnover was well over 26 million euros, and in 2017 it was estimated to reach 27.5 million euros.

At the 2018 Düsseldorf boat show, the Bella 620C was selected as the Boat of the Year in the category of pleasure boats under 25 feet.

In 2018, Bella Boats launches Falcon boats with aluminium hull.

=== Nimbus ===
The company passed into the ownership of Swedish company Nimbus Boats in autumn 2018. Nimbus itself has about 145 employees. The company's turnover was just under 50 million euros in 2018.

The turnover of Nimbus Group in 2019 amounted to approximately 92—93 million euros, of which Bella Boats accounted for approximately 26 million euros. After purchasing Bella Boats, the group has a total of about 300 employees, half of them in Finland, one hundred in Sweden and 50 in Poland.

At the time of the acquisition, it was suspected that boat production would come to an end in Kuopio. On the contrary, Nimbus gave the design and production of its new T8 model to Bella Boats. The boat was presented at Düsseldorf boat show in 2020, after which more orders came in than the factory had the capacity to produce. As a result, Bella Boats hired 15 to 20 new employees and explored solutions to make the workflow even more efficient. The target was to manufacture one T8 every two days.

In the summer of 2020, Bella's 50th anniversary model Flipper 900 DC would be presented to the international boat media in Nauvo. In the same year, the boat was also presented at the Genoa boat show, where Bella Boats participated with three Flipper boats. The boats being showcased were 900 ST and 600 DC in addition to 900 DC, and the aim of the show was to present the collection to new dealers in Mediterranean countries and boaters as well. The boat is designed by the Norwegian Karl Marius Norschau, and the aim is to produce 50—70 boats per year. In early autumn, sales of the Flipper 900 DC were so successful that all the boats that were on the production plan were sold.

In 2021, the new electric boat Bella ZERO 6.3 is launched.

The new Aquador 300 HT was presented to the public at the UIVA Helsinki boat show on 18 August 2022 and the Aquador 250 HT later that autumn. It is Aquador's most extensive model renewal in 20 years. In the coming years, the largest Aquador ever, Aquador 380 HT, will be presented.

In 2023, the boat trade fell more drastically than expected, and dealers' stocks were full. As a result, many Finnish boat manufacturers didn't restart their operations after the summer holidays. Bella Boats also closed most of its production in Kuopio. Production in Larsmo, however, continued as normal, as uncertainty concerns primarily boats under eight metres, and boats being produced in Larsmo are more than eight metres tall. Of the 140 employees of the Kuopio factory, about 60 employees would be provisionally laid off for about one month, after which work would continue on a three-day working week. At Bella, the market is closely monitored, and boats will be manufactured according to demand. Despite the layoffs, Bella Boats’ sales in early autumn were ahead of the previous year. In total, the company produces more than 900 boats a year, with exports accounting for about 80 per cent.

== Design history ==
After the economic downturn in 2008, the subsequent recovery of Bella Boats was not hindered solely by economic reasons; boat brands also needed an upgrade. The boat shows in 2008 and 2009 taught the company that the boat world had changed, and Bella should change views as well. Lessons were taken by analysing successful boat brands.

The 2015 Bella range included 9 boat models, the Flipper range 10 models and the Aquador range 7 models. Attempts had been made to reduce the model range; in the past there had been up to 15 different models of Aquador in the production, but at that time it was estimated that five models and their different versions would be sufficient five years later. Bella and Flipper would each have approximately ten models with different versions. The boat industry was heading to the same direction as the automotive industry; customers are constantly waiting for something new, and therefore there are fewer models, but they are even more sophisticated. Furthermore, in terms of development costs, downsizing the model range was wise.

In autumn 2018, the company passed into the ownership of Swedish company Nimbus Boats. In the new situation, Bella Boats started to adapt their design to suit international tastes, however without copying what others already had. Regarding the international market, attention started shifting towards Asia and Australia, whereas it had earlier been heavily focused on the Nordic countries.

After the acquisition, Nimbus set the goal of clarifying the brands of different boat models Bella had; the goal for the Aquador boats was to develop the design and increase the export. Bella and Flipper had become so similar to each other over the time that Bella was brought back closer to its roots as a general-use boat for families and Flipper was taken in a sportier direction to make it interesting to a buyer who also drives a sporty car.

=== Bella ===
Over the years, Bella's boat collection has included several boat models that have become popular in Finland.

In 1975, the Bella 530 HT, or “clog”, went into production, and 1600 boats were produced by the late 1980s. The model is the most manufactured hardtop boat in Finland. Production was restarted in the mid-1990s and continued until the 2000s.

The 700 series boats, developed on the basis of the 660 model, also became popular folk’s boats. They differ from current boat trends by their plump shape.

One of the long-lived Bella models was introduced in 1988 under the name Falcon 26 Molinari, and its production continued until the 2010s under the name Falcon 26 Fantino. In total, over one thousand boats were produced. The popularity of the boat is explained by a functional hull shape and a design that has aged well. Significant changes were made in 1998 and 2008.

In the 2010s model renewal, the boats were refreshed with orange-coloured details on the hull taping, seat upholstery and detailing. However, for the 2018 model year, colourful hull taping was abandoned, and grey became the option for orange details.

=== Aquador ===
The Aquador boat company was founded by advertising agency entrepreneur Sakari Mattila, and Raimo Sonninen was involved as a minority shareholder. In 1993, the Aquador 22 boat was designed, and Bella Boats started its production in 1994 in Kuopio. In spring 1996, Bella acquired half of Aquador Yachts Oy, and a 26-foot version was also designed together.

The first Aquador model, 22 HT, was presented at the Helsinki boat show in 1995. The next new model was 26 HT, and at the same time the manufacture of boats moved to Bella Boats. In 1998, Aquador Boats Oy was founded, and the production was moved to Ireland. However, manufacturing costs quickly became too high, there were labour supply problems and production experienced disruptions even if there was sufficient demand in European markets. The decision was made to sell the Aquador collection with moulds, and the buyer was Bella Boats.

Aquador 21 WA was introduced in 1999. It was designed by Rolf Eliasson and Jörvel Sundqvist. In the middle of the boat design process, Bella Boats bought Aquador, and production returned from Ireland to Finland, Kuopio. As the quality of the Aquador boats improved with the change of owner, boat prices increased by about 15 per cent.

In the first decade of the 21st century, Aquador was the leading Finnish premium boat brand. However, due to the fierce competition, Aquador's style began to be overshadowed by competitors, and the collection needed an update. In 2017, the new flagship of the collection, 35 AQ, was introduced. It was designed by Espen Thorup, who had already redesigned the Bella and Flipper collections. Deviating from the traditional Aquador style, the boat was more angular and steeper in design. It was well received right after its premiere at the Düsseldorf boat show.

=== Flipper ===
The history of Flipper begins in 1966, when Harry Ölander from Nauvo founded the Na-Boats boatyard. The Flippers were designed by the Swede Sigurd Isacson, and his stepped hull design became a trademark of Flipper boats. The name, Flipper, was borrowed from the dolphin in the popular television series of the 1960s, and it gave the boats a fresh and positive image.

Known for its quality fiberglass work, Flipper was also among the first boat brands to use only layered deck structures. The success boat model of the early 1980s was the Flipper 640 HT with its over one thousand produced boats. However, the flagship of the collection was the Flying Flipper, which entered the market in 1984.

Flipper, which had been well off, sought even better opportunities for growth when it was sold in 1986 to Rapala and in 1990 further to Siltala Yachts. Eventually, Bella Boats bought the rights, moulds and the brand name of Flipper in 1992. Flipper's image immediately increased demand for Bella Boats in international markets.

In the early 2000s Sigurd Isacson opted aside and Håkan Södergren took full responsibility for the design of the Flippers.

All the Flipper boats were redesigned in the early 2010s. The reforms started by the search of a suitable top designer, and Espen Thorup was chosen. He was given free rein to design a series of 6—9 metre day cruiser boats. The boats sought to meet customers' needs even better by improving the design of the boats, making handling easier, and creating stiffer and more durable boat structures. Between 2012 and 2014, a total of ten new Flipper models entered the market.

The fourth-generation Flippers designed by Thorup renewed the image of the Flipper brand. The new boats were aimed at premium class, while earlier models had been more modest in their image. Flipper had survived the 1990s recession under the ownership of Bella Boats, but since then, distinctly less effort was invested in the development of the label than, for example, in Aquador, which was acquired by Bella Boats in 2000. The third-generation boats of Flipper did not gain much popularity, but with Thorup's new models, interest in the boat brand rose to a new level.

=== Falcon ===
Falcon aluminium boats entered the market in the 2018 season, and their aluminium hulls are manufactured by Campnou Oy in Ähtäri, Finland. Aluminium boats had already gained popularity in the boat market in the preceding years, so even in Bella Boats the time was considered appropriate for the launch of their own production. In the Nordic market in particular, aluminium boats had a strong position.

The Falcon name was used by Bella Boats already earlier; the early Bella flagship brand Falcon, born in 1986, was inspired by Italian boat designers when the company wanted to turn the down-to-earth Bella into a classier boat. The Falcon aluminium boats brought the name back to the model range, this time as high-quality multi-purpose boats.

Manufacturing of Falcon aluminium boats began in the autumn of 2017 with two models (BR6 and BR7), and two more models (BR5 and BR8) were added to production the following year. The production of a cabin version (C7) started in 2019.
