= Opinion polling for the 2011 Finnish parliamentary election =

Opinion polling in the 2011 Finnish parliamentary election began in January 2010, just over a year before the April 2011 election. The major difference between the polls before 2011 and the polls before previous elections was the larger-than-expected support for the True Finns.

== Polling information ==
Taloustutkimus performs monthly telephone polls on party popularity for the Finnish Broadcasting Company. The monthly sample size varies between 2,900 and 3,900 with a margin of error of about ±1.8 %. (Polling does not include Åland as it has its own party system.)

There were also other less frequent opinion polls.

== Polls ==
View source data.

Taloustutkimus' monthly polls:

Party	2007	Jan 2010	Feb 2010	Mar 2010	Apr 2010	May 2010	Jun 2010	Jul 2010	Aug 2010	Sep 2010	Oct 2010	Nov 2010	Dec 2010	Jan 2011	Feb 2011	Mar 2011	Apr 2011
Centre Party	23.1%	20.7%	19.6%	20.7%	20.6%	18.6%	19.2%	19.7%	19.7%	19.0%	17.6%	18.6%	18.8%	18.5%	18.9%	18.1%	18.6%
National Coalition Party	22.3%	23.2%	23.6%	22.9%	22.7%	23.0%	21.9%	23.0%	22.8%	21.9%	21.7%	21.1%	21.2%	20.4%	20.9%	20.1%	21.2%
Social Democrats	21.4%	21.0%	21.2%	21.2%	21.3%	21.3%	21.1%	20.5%	20.4%	19.8%	19.1%	18.4%	18.1%	18.9%	17.5%	18.1%	18.0%
Left Alliance	8.8%	8.1%	8.3%	8.0%	7.6%	7.7%	8.1%	7.8%	7.5%	7.2%	7.8%	7.9%	8.1%	7.2%	7.3%	7.3%	8.2%
Green League	8.5%	10.1%	10.4%	10.4%	10.3%	10.3%	10.6%	9.5%	9.2%	9.9%	9.7%	9.1%	9.5%	9.2%	8.5%	9.0%	9.0%
Christian Democrats	4.9%	4.6%	4.3%	4.3%	4.8%	4.2%	4.2%	4.3%	3.9%	4.4%	4.6%	4.5%	3.8%	3.8%	4.2%	4.6%	4.2%
Swedish People's Party of Finland	4.6%	4.1%	4.1%	4.0%	3.6%	3.7%	3.9%	4.0%	4.4%	3.9%	4.2%	4.0%	3.4%	4.1%	3.9%	3.8%	4.2%
True Finns	4.1%	6.4%	6.3%	6.8%	7.8%	9.6%	9.8%	10.1%	10.7%	12.5%	14.3%	14.9%	15.3%	16.6%	16.9%	17.2%	15.4%
/

Other polls also indicated a significant rise in support for the True Finns. A poll commissioned by TNS Gallup for Helsingin Sanomat in March showed the True Finns with 18.4% of support, making it the second most popular party behind the National Coalition Party. Surveys in individual electoral districts as well had shown large support for the True Finns. The party had polled over 20% support in several electoral districts. An Helsingin Sanomat poll suggested that the party was eating into the Centre Party's vote bank in Lapland and the Left Alliance could also lose one of its two seats in the district. Similar developments had been polled in the other electoral districts; Suomen Kuvalehti said that on the whole the True Finns were attracting supporters from all the three largest parties and that one-fifth of its voters did not vote in the last election.

A poll in March indicated that rural residents - the core support base of the Centre Party - and blue-collar workers took the most negative views towards immigration.

The latest poll commissioned by TNS Gallup for Helsingin Sanomat in early April indicated that the NCP was still the largest party with 20.2%, closely followed by the Centre Party with 17.9% and the Social Democrats with 18%, while True Finns polled slightly less than in the previous poll with 16.9%. The Green League was further behind with 8.3%. A representative of TNS Gallup said that the actual support of the True Finns was hard to estimate because of exceptionally high margins of error and the fact that the result of the previous election was used to adjust the poll's raw data.

Although the NCP had been atop the Centre Party in all opinion polls, the polls concerning the voters' preference for the next prime minister had given higher numbers for the incumbent PM Kiviniemi of the Centre Party. In an April poll she was the citizens' favourite candidate to be next PM with 28%, while NCP's Katainen received 27%. Soini of the True Finns got a share of 13% and the Social Democrat Urpilainen received 10%.

=== Other polling ===
A poll of Finnish teachers, mostly from southern and western Finland, indicated that 41% questioned by Opettaja-lehti ("Teacher Magazine") wanted limits of 20-30% on immigrant students in schools and daycare centres. A 75% majority also said that immigrants should be dispersed throughout the country to avoid concentrations of immigrant populations within certain areas. A majority also said that they had received no training to teach immigrants.

A study conducted by Swedish and Finnish economists found that there is "a greater effect of good looks, in terms of more votes for candidates on the right." A poll, conducted for the eighth time, of 28,000 secondary, upper secondary, and vocational school students below the age of voting suggested that the Eduskunta would have 12 parties in the "youth election." The poll suggested that only 58 women would be MPs, the average age of MPs would be 38.6 and that there would be more immigrant MPs. In terms of seats the Green League and the National Coalition Party would be the largest followed by the Centre Party. The Pirate Party would also get as many seats as the Left Alliance. Incumbent Prime Minister Mari Kiviniemi would not win her seat and True Finns leader Timo Soini would get the largest number of personal votes.
