= Chicks with Guns =

2011 photographic book by Lindsay McCrum

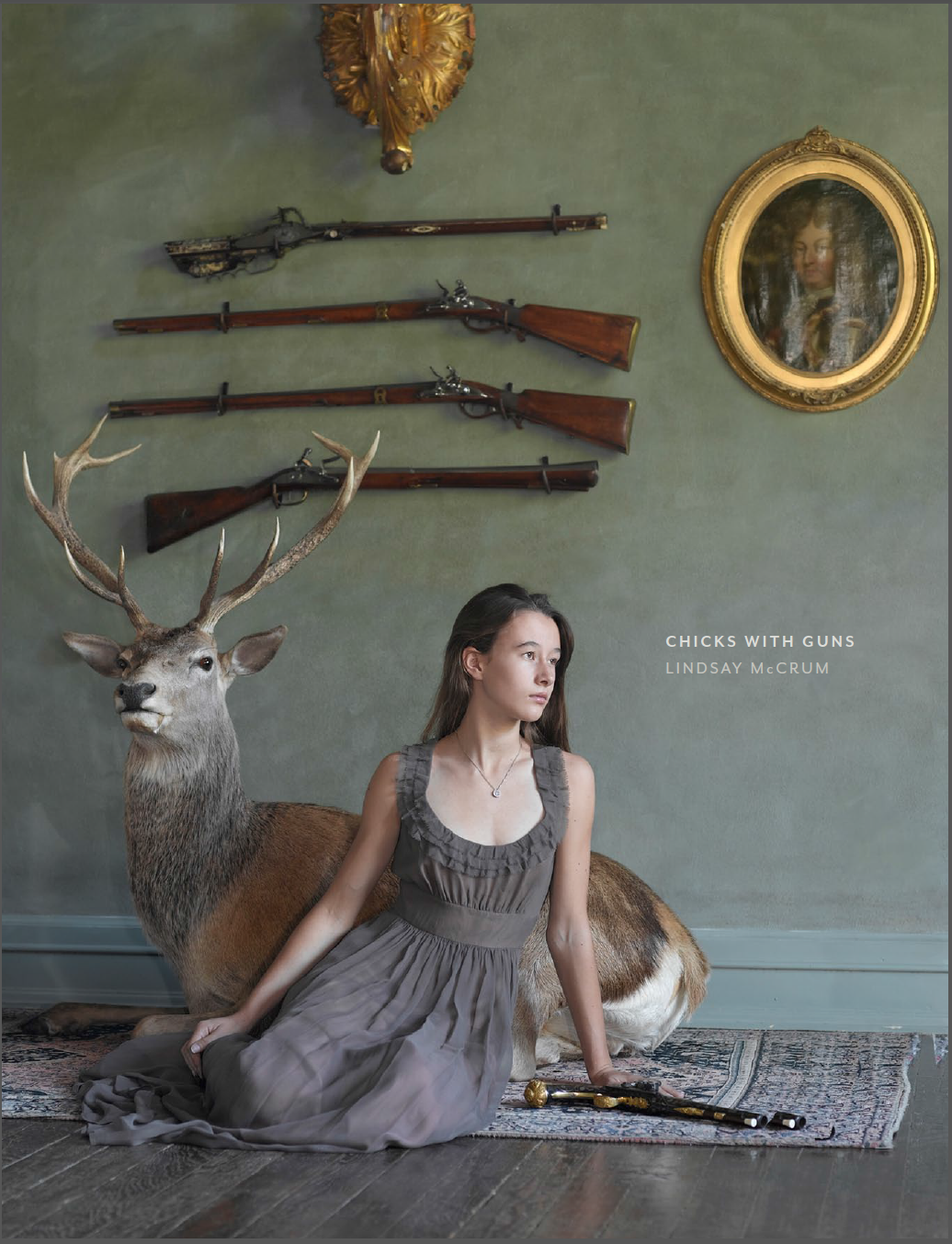
- Book Cover Image
- Author: Lindsay McCrum
- Genre: Photo-book
- Publisher: Vendome Press
- Publication date: October 1, 2011
- Pages: 168
- ISBN: 9780865652750

Chicks with Guns is a photo-book created by Lindsay McCrum. Lindsay McCrum is a fine arts photographer, and resides in both New York and California. Ms. McCrum received her undergraduate degree from Yale University and her Masters of Fine Arts from the San Francisco Art Institute.

"Chicks with Guns" features portraits of American women from different backgrounds with their firearms. The book serves to explore the issues of self-image and gender roles by challenging assumptions of gun ownership. The women were all different, ranging from hunters, police officers, sportswomen, and competitive shooters. Some weapons are collectible, others are still active. During the photography, McCrum photographed 280 women, selecting only 81 after the final editing process. The oldest female participant was 85 years old. The youngest female participant was 8 years old.

McCrum stated that the idea for photo-book came after reading an article in The Economist which described the large size of the American gun industry. McCrum did not create "Chicks with Guns" for political statement amongst controversy. McCrum does not own a gun.

== Reception ==
The book was well-received selling out on Amazon on its first day. McCrum made it clear that she has no personal involvement with firearms.
