= Sean Foley =

Sean Foley may refer to:

- Seán Foley (born 1949), Irish sportsman
- Sean Foley (director) (born 1964), British theatre director, actor and writer
- Sean Foley (golf instructor) (born 1974), Canadian golf instructor who coaches several PGA Tour players
- Sean Foley (ethnographer), Irish ethnographer
- Sean Foley (film editor), American film editor, whose credits include The Slumber Party Massacre
- Sean Foley, American musician of Bright Eyes

== See also ==
- Sean Reid-Foley (born 1995), American baseball player
- Shaun Foley (born 1986), Australian rugby league footballer
