= Social Burgerjoint =

Hamburger restaurant chain

Social Burgerjoint is a Finnish hamburger restaurant chain, part of the Kotipizza Group. In 2021 the chain had nine restaurants in Finland. The interior of the restaurants is decorated to look like a North American hamburger restaurant. The menu includes many vegetarian and vegan options. The food is prepared on a charcoal grill.

== History ==
In January 2017 Herkko Volanen and 2012 MasterChef Suomi winner Mika Tuomonen founded a hamburger restaurant called Social Food Street Burgerjoint in Sörnäinen, Helsinki. According to an interview by Suomen Kuvalehti the owners, their hamburgers and most of all the Mibrasa charcoal grill used at the restaurant impressed Kotipizza Group CEO Tommi Tervanen. The founders stayed in the chain as minority shareholders and restaurateurs.

In autumn 2018 the chain had three restaurants in Helsinki and a fourth restaurant in Kerava.

The chain opened a new restaurant in Hamina in April 2019 and another one in Porvoo in May in the same year. The chain opened its seventh restaurant in Oulu in December 2019.

In 2021 the chain had nine restaurants in Finland.

== Awards ==
- The Social Burgerjoint "Korean Kimchi Burger" won the best hamburger award at the European Street Food contest in September 2018. It reached joint first place along with the Swedish Matsas Mat. The contest was held in Berlin, Germany and had participants from 16 countries.
- In spring 2019 Social Burgerjoint reached 28th place at the "Big seven travel - world's best burger" list.
- In 2019 the Social Burgerjoint "Brookdale" hamburger won the best hamburger award at the European Street Food contest.
