= Lukas Birk =

Austrian photographer, archivist, and publisher

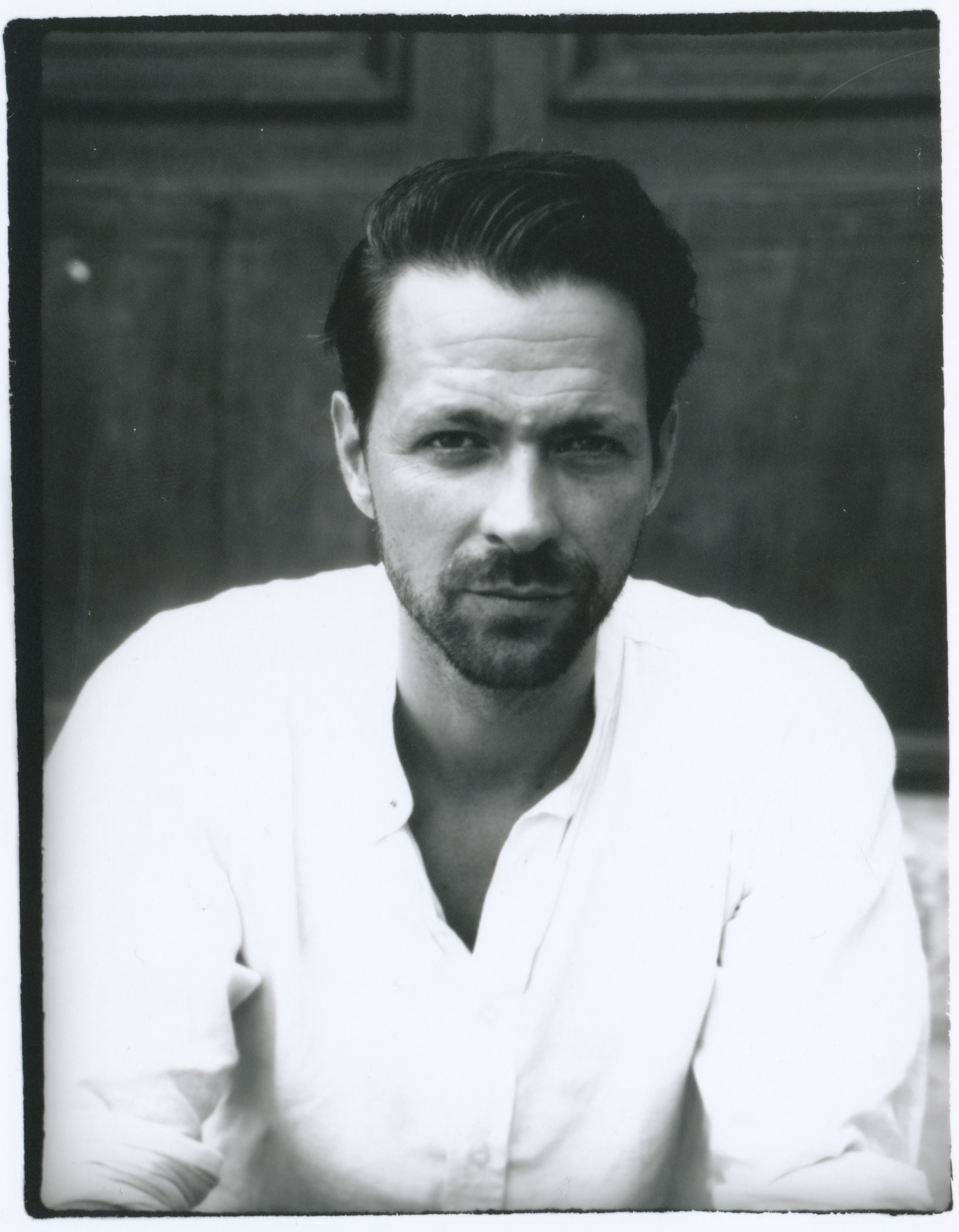
- Lukas Birk, 2019.
- Born: 30 August 1982 (age 44); Bregenz, Vorarlberg, Austria
- Education: University of West London, Rhode Island School of Design
- Known for: Historical photography of Asia
- Website: www.lukasbirk.com

Lukas Birk (born 1982) is an Austrian photographer, archivist, and publisher. He is mainly known for his visual archive work in Myanmar and research on Box Camera photography in Afghanistan. Birk has worked on photographic projects, films and visual research in China, South and Southeast Asia and the Indian subcontinent. He has published numerous books on visual culture and photographic history.

Birk also co-founded the Austro Sino Art Program (2008–2014) in Beijing, China and the SewonArtSpace in Yogyakarta, Indonesia. In Myanmar, he founded the Myanmar Photo Archive, the country’s first public photography archive and set up an accompanying publishing program. Further, his publishing company Fraglich Publishing focuses on publications of visual culture and limited edition prints.

== Early life and education ==
Lukas Birk was born in 1982 in Bregenz, Vorarlberg, Austria. Initially he studied journalism and radio. Birk attended the Ealing School of Art Design and Media of the University of West London, graduating with a bachelor's degree in digital art and photography in 2005.^{[dead link,better source needed]} He then continued his studies at Rhode Island School of Design (RISD), graduating with a M.F.A. degree in Printmaking in 2017.

== Work ==
=== Kafkanistan ===
Birk’s first major body of work Kafkanistan – tourism to conflict areas (2005–2008), produced with Irish ethnographer Sean Foley, explored the activities of tourists in Afghanistan and the Pakistani tribal areas. Their research resulted in a feature film, exhibition and book.

=== Austro Sino Arts program ===
Together with Austrian artist and scholar Karel Dudesek, Birk co-founded the Austro Sino Arts Program (ASAP). This program operated out of Beijing, P.R. China, between 2008 and 2014, organizing exhibitions, film festivals and publications. It showcased the work of non-Chinese artists working in China and produced these artists’ perspectives on China. The project received major support from the Austrian Arts Council.

During his stay in China, Birk both collected historical photographs and took his own pictures of the same places. These were published in his monograph Polaroids from the Middle Kingdom. Old and New World Visions of China.

=== SewonArtSpace ===
In 2011, Karel Dudesek and Birk founded SewonArtSpace in Yogyakarta, Indonesia. SewonArtSpace is a non-profit art space and residency program hosting primarily Austrian artists and connecting them to the local art scene in Yogyakarta, one of Southeast Asia’s most thriving art cities. The first public exhibition presented artworks by Dudesek, Birk and Marbot Fritsch as well as Indonesian artists Nurul 'Acil' Hayat, Arya Sukapura Putra, and Baskoro Latu. The project received funding from the Austrian Federal Ministry for Culture, Arts and Education.

=== Afghan Box Camera project ===
In 2011, Birk and Sean Foley returned to Afghanistan to investigate the last remaining Box Camera photographers working in the streets of Kabul and other cities in Afghanistan as well as in Peshawar, Pakistan. They conducted research trips between 2011 and 2014, resulting in an online archive as well as the books Afghan Box Camera and Photo Peshawar. Birk and Foley coined the terms Afghan Box Camera and Kamra-e-Faoree, two descriptions for Box Camera photography in these countries. This was achieved primarily through international media coverage, open-source films and their manual ‘How to build an Afghan Box Camera’, published on social media and their own platform on Vimeo.

=== Alaminüt photography ===
In 2014, Birk began collecting box camera photographs called alaminüt (Turkish, from French: 'by the minute') in bazaars in Istanbul and Ankara, but also in Izmir, Mardin and Erzerum. Alaminüt photographers had been active across Turkey from the 1910s until their gradual disappearance in the mid-1980s. In 2023, Birk published a dedicated website and the photo-book Alaminüt Fotoğraf. Itinerant photography in Turkey in English and Turkish. In his introduction, he wrote about the social importance of this kind of vernacular photography during the formative years of the modern Turkish republic and presented images of different sub-genres, including portraits of families, professional groups, soldiers and alaminüt photographers at work. According to Turkish social scientist Özge Calafato, who contributed with an introduction to the book, alaminüt photographers "filled in an important vacuum by penetrating remote towns and villages, reaching out to the lower classes, who might otherwise have no access to photo studios at the time."

=== Myanmar Photo Archive ===
In 2013, Birk started collecting photographic material and conducting research on the history of photography in Myanmar. The same year, he founded the first public photographic archive focusing on local Myanmar vernacular photography, the Myanmar Photo Archive (MPA). The MPA has produced several exhibitions with materials from their archive comprising more than 30,000 images and started a photo-book publishing program in Yangon. The books were published in English and Burmese and distributed internationally. The MPA has received major funding from the British Library's Endangered Archives Programme and the German cultural center – Goethe-Institute – in Myanmar.

== Topography of Remembrance ==
In April 2026, the Vorarlberg Museum in Bregenz, Austria, opened a temporary exhibition created by Birk. Titled Topography of Remembrance, it presented visual media and other documents about World War II reflecting the war as a global conflict from each of the different country's perspective. The exhibition and accompanying book chronicle the lives of ten individuals who lived during this time, with each person presenting a specific and individual perspective. These life stories bear witness of a Japanese soldier in China, an Indian nurse working in Italy, an African-American GI experiencing personal freedom in Europe, a guerrilla fighter in the Philippines, a Kenyan soldier sent to Burma, a Senegalese tirailleur imprisoned in a German camp, a French Jewish resistance fighter in Algeria, a Palestinian woman witnessing post-war violence, a Crimean Tatar woman enduring deportations under Stalin and an Austrian carpenter imprisoned in former Yugoslavia. According to the publisher, these narratives offer a multi-focused understanding of the war, shaped by questions of empire, colonial expansion, and new concepts of human rights.

== Collections ==
Birk's work is held in the following public permanent collections:

- Museum Vorarlberg, Austria
- Walker Art Center
- RISD Museum

== Publications ==
- with Sean Foley. Kafkanistan – tourism to conflict zones. Fraglich, Austria / Glitterati, USA, 2008/2012. ISBN 978-0985169626
- with Sean Foley. Afghan Box Camera. Dewi Lewis, UK, 2013. ISBN 978-1907893360
- Polaroids from the Middle Kingdom. Glitterati, USA, 2014. ISBN 978-0988174566
- 35 Bilder Krieg. Fraglich, Austria, 2015. ISBN 978-3-9502773-7-1
- with Sean Foley and Omar Khan. Photo Peshawar. Mapin / PIX, Ahmedabad & New Delhi, India: 2018. ISBN 978-9385360466
- Burmese Photographers. Goethe-Institut Myanmar, Yangon, 2018
- with Natasha Christia. Gülistan. Fraglich, Austria, 2019
- FERNWEH – a man's journey. Fraglich, Austria, 2019. ISBN 978-3-9502773-0-2
- with Özge Calafato. Alaminüt Fotoğraf. Itinerant photography in Turkey. Fraglich, Austria, 2023. ISBN 978-3-9505064-1-9
- My Name is Noor Mohammad Khan. 2nd ed. Fraglich, Austria, 2024.
- Topography of Remembrance. Fraglich, Austria, 2026. ISBN 978-3-903616-08-0
