= Vapautemme hinta =

1941 Finnish book

- A copy of Vapautemme hinta
- Author: Compiled by Suomen Kuvalehti
- Language: Finnish
- Subject: Finnish soldiers killed in the Winter War; civilian deaths from Soviet air raids
- Genre: Memorial / historical directory
- Set in: Winter War (1939–1940)
- Publisher: Suomen Kuvalehti
- Publication date: 1941
- Publication place: Finland

Vapautemme hinta ('The price of our freedom') is a 1941 book compiled by the Finnish magazine Suomen Kuvalehti. It consists of the names and, when available, pictures of all the Finnish soldiers who died in the Winter War from 1939–1940 between Finland and the Soviet Union. Soldiers were grouped by county and municipality to show the effect on each region, and pictures of the soldiers' church from their hometown was also included. The book also includes pictures of civilian deaths from Soviet air raids as well as pictures of bombed cities, and a directory to make it easier to search up specific people.

Politically, Suomen Kuvalehti was a publication of the Finnish right; it had previously published a column in its magazine to memorialize and honor fallen Finnish Whites from the Finnish Civil War between the German-friendly "Whites" and the Soviet-friendly "Reds". Vapautemme hinta is a continuation of the idea; it made the case that a unified Finland preserved its independence and freedom through the heroic blood sacrifice of its sons, and bolstered Finnish nationalism. In spite of great losses, the Winter War was thus presented as a success in that Finland still stood as an independent nation at all rather than being entirely conquered. Many Finnish families kept a copy of Vapautemme hinta in their homes.

The artist Seppo Renvall made a 1990 experimental film based on Vapautemme hinta. In 2019, artist Harri Pälviranta utilized the book from another angle, scanning all the fallen soldiers from the book and reworking the pictures into artwork. The extensive records compiled by Vapautemme hinta have been used in occasional academic research when studying death rates in war and similar studies requiring a large and complete record of fallen soldiers.
