= PHotoEspaña =

Annual exhibition of photography in Spain

Coordinates: 40.4333°N 3.6833°W

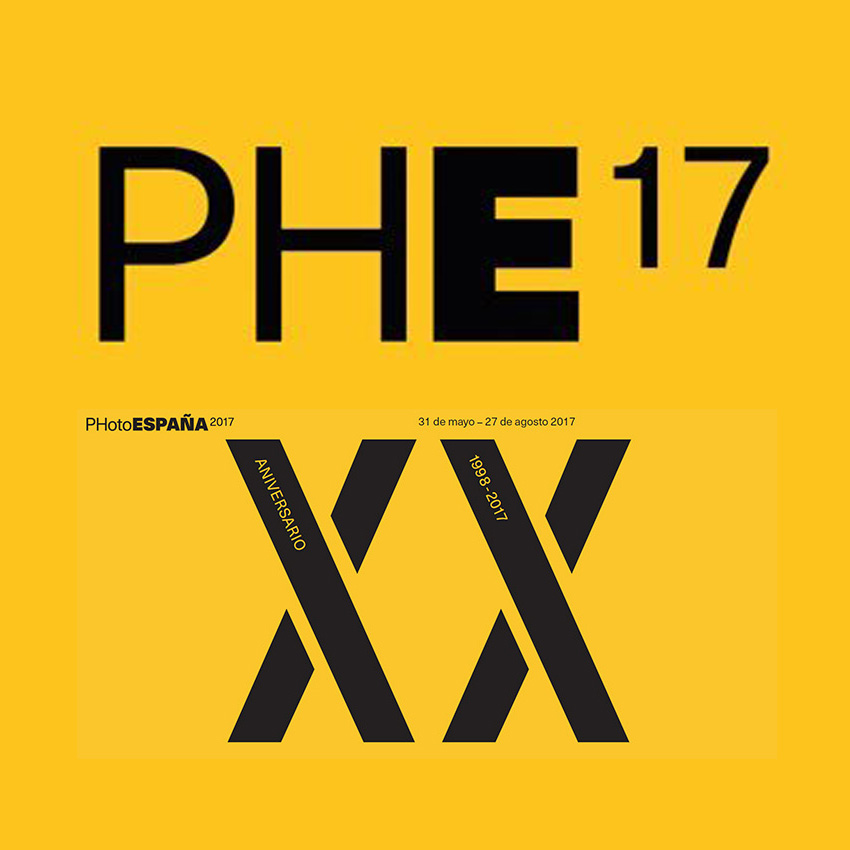
PHotoEspaña 2017 poster

PHotoEspaña, the International Festival of Photography and Visual Arts of Madrid, is a Spanish photography festival based in Madrid, founded in 1998. It is supported by private companies and public institutions, and its program presents work by Spanish and international photographers. The festival includes an awards programme with several categories.

== History ==
PHotoEspaña, or International Festival of Photography and Visual Arts of Madrid, was founded in 1998.

== Description ==
PHotoEspaña is the largest photography event in Europe.

Each edition of PHotoEspaña is dedicated to a specific theme, and the programme is divided into the Official Section, which includes museums, institutions and large exhibition centres; and the Festival Off, which includes art galleries and other venues.

Some of the institutions that have taken part in hosting the festival include: Casa de América, Museo Nacional Centro de Arte Reina Sofía, Museo Thyssen-Bornemisza, Círculo de Bellas Artes, and the Prado Museum.

The festival is supported by private companies and public institutions such as the Ministry of Culture and the regional and municipal governments of Madrid. It is organized by La Fábrica, a cultural management entity.

Since 2011 the Loewe Foundation has partnered with PHotoEspaña, in most years showcasing the work of a well-known photographer. In 2021 (digitally in 2020; physical exhibition postponed owing to the COVID-19 pandemic) the foundation presented a photographic exhibition, Divine: an icon of queer culture. which was held at CASA LOEWE in Madrid, and honoured queer icon Harris Glenn Milstead, better known by his stage name, Divine. Featured photographers have included George Platt Lynes, Ron Galella, Tina Modotti, Peter Hujar, and David Wojnarowicz.

Francis Hodgson, writing in the Financial Times in 2014, said "PHotoEspaña gives every photography festival in the world a standard to aim for."

== Awards ==
=== Discovery Award ===
The PhotoEspaña Discovery Award for best portfolio (Premio PHotoEspaña Descubrimientos al mejor portfolio) is an award that has been given since 1998. It is open to any photographer who has attended one of PhotoEspaña's portfolio reviews, which are held in Madrid, Caracas and São Paulo. The winner receives an exhibition in the next edition of Photoespaña.

- 2007: Battered by Harri Pälviranta
- 2014: Moises by Mariela Sancari; the judges were Greg Hobson, Raphaelle Stopin, and Christin Ann Bertrand.
- 2015: Parallel Crisis by Yannis Karpouzis. The judges were Lorenza Bravetta, Gilles Favier and Markus Hartmann.
- 2016: Edited monument by Andres Duran
- 2019: Investigation of Love by Lilia Luganskaia

=== Best Photography Book, international category ===
- 2010: Atlas Monographs by Max Pam. Sydney: T&G Publishing, 2009. With the writer Stephen Muecke.
- 2014: Party. Quotations from Chairman Mao Tse-Tung by Cristina de Middel. Madrid: RM; London: Archive of Modern Conflict, 2013. ISBN 9788415118671.
- 2017: (Un)expected by Peter Dekens. Breda, the Netherlands: The Eriskay Connection, 2016.
- 2018: The Restoration Will by Mayumi Suzuki. Siena, Italy: Ceiba Editions, 2017.
- 2019: Gülistan by Lukas Birk and Natasha Christia. Austria: Fraglich, 2019.
- 2021: Hayal & Hakikat: A Handbook of Forgiveness & A Handbook of Punishment by Cemre Yeşil Gönenli

=== Best Photography Book, national category ===
- 2014:
  - Winner: Ostalgia by Simona Rota. Cádiz, Spain: Cuadernos de la Kursala, University of Cádiz, 2013. Edited by Fabulatorio.
  - Honourable mention: The Pigs by Carlos Spottorno. Madrid: RM / Phree, 2013.
- 2018: Like by Eduardo Nave. Barcelona, Spain: Ediciones Anómalas, 2018.
- 2019: Remembering the Future by Ángel Albarrán & Anna Cabrera. Madrid: RM / Phree, 2019.
- 2021: Where the maps bend by Juan Valbuena

=== Best Self-Published Book ===
- 2019: The Migrant by Anäis López
- 2021: SPIN by Yusuke Takagi

=== Outstanding Publishing House of the Year ===
- 2014: Dewi Lewis
- 2018: Skinnerboox
- 2019: Phree

=== PhotoEspaña and OjodePez Award for Human Values ===
- 2014: Aitor Lara

=== PhotoEspaña Award ===
This award pays tribute to the professional career of a major figure.

- 2014: Ramón Masats
- 2019: Donna Ferrato
- 2021: Isabel Muñoz

=== Bartolomé Ros Award ===
Awarded for the best Spanish career in photography.

- 2014: Gervasio Sánchez
- 2019: Pilar Pequeño
