= Myanmar Photo Archive =

Cultural heritage project for Myanmar visual culture

Coordinates: 16°48′07.7″N 96°09′30.6″E

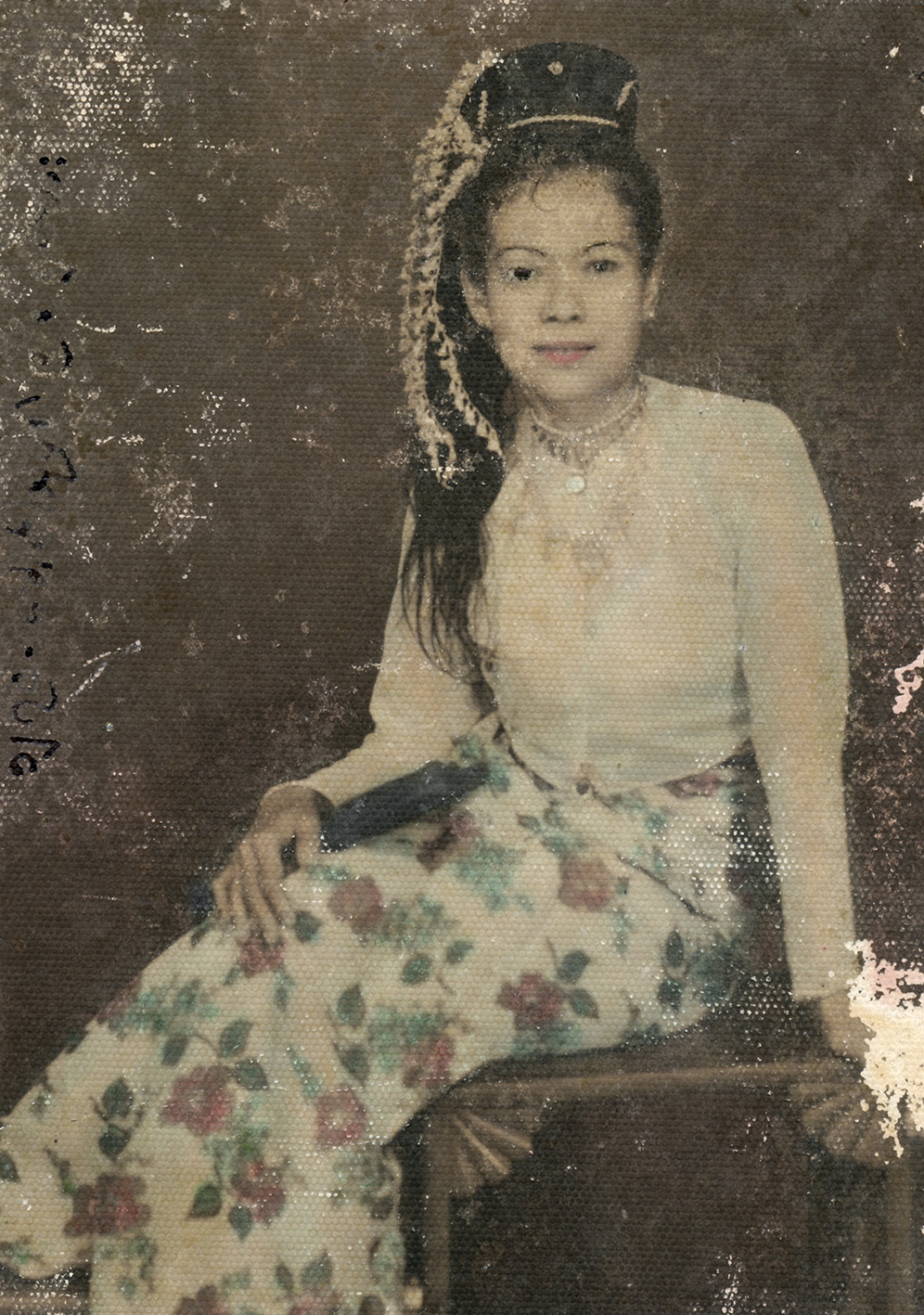
Hand-colored studio portrait of a woman in Burma, ca. 1910

Myanmar Photo Archive (MPA; Burmese: မြန်မာဓာတ်ပုံမော်ကွန်းသည်, romanized: myanmardharatpone mawkwann sai) is both a physical archive of photographs taken between 1889 and 1995 in Myanmar (Burma), and a public awareness project of the country's visual culture. The MPA presents exhibitions, online resources, public events, and publishes books on the history of photography in Myanmar and former Burma. The collection holds more than 30,000 images and other related materials, and is the largest archive for Myanmar's photographic history.

== History and activities ==
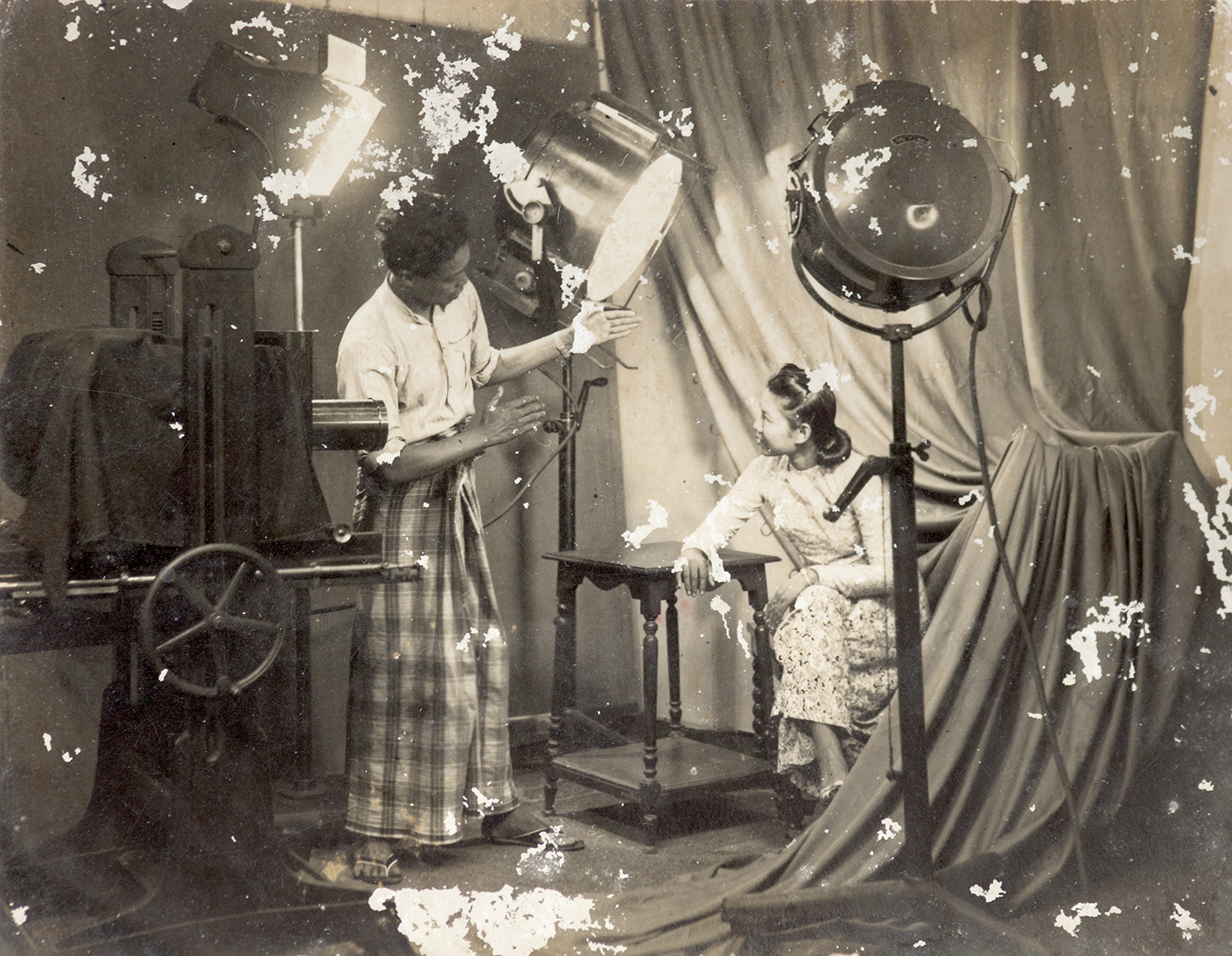
Burmese photographer U Kywat at work, Asia Studio, Yangon, 1940s

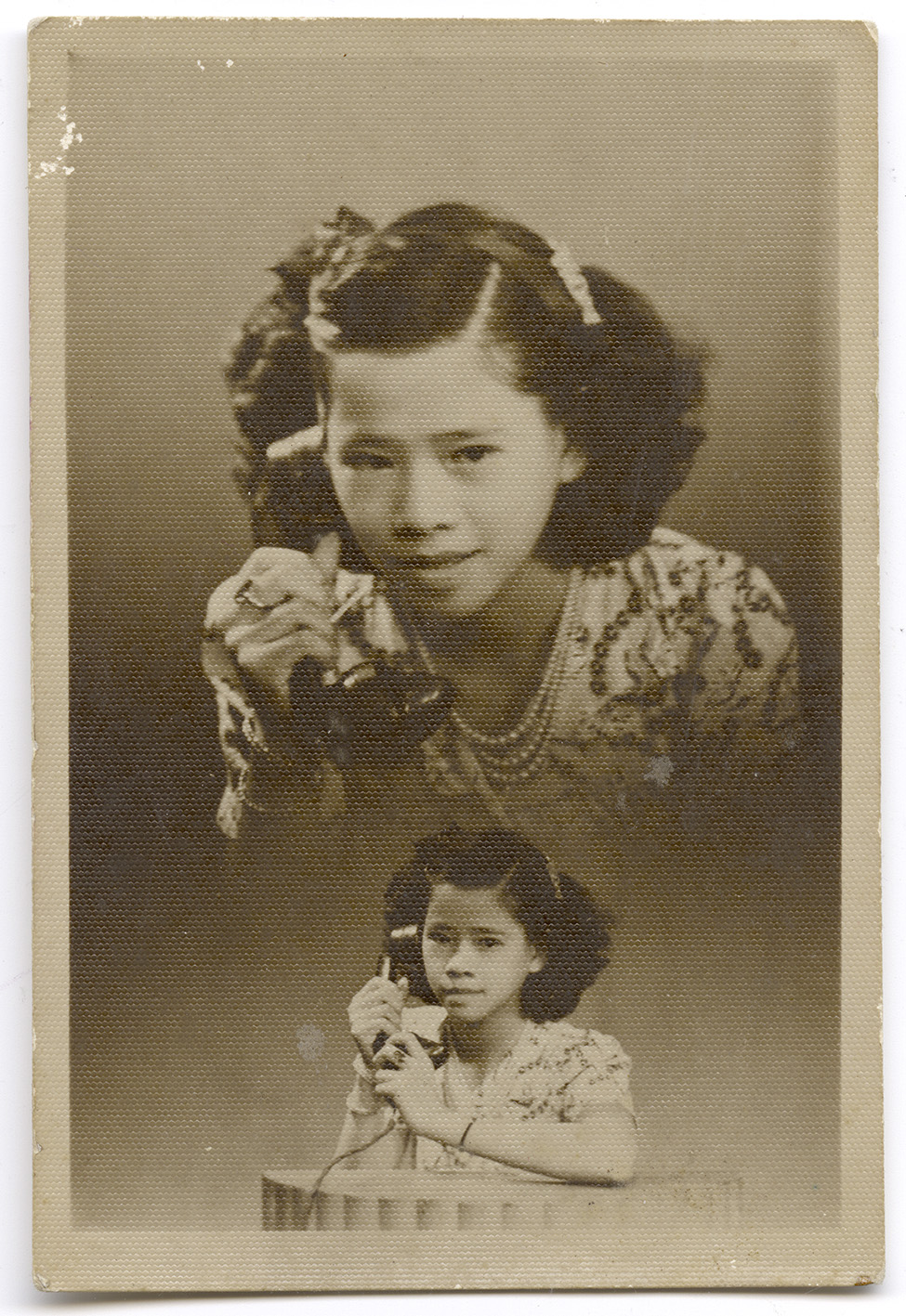
A child's portrait, double exposures in the darkroom, Yangon, 1960s

In 2013, Austrian photographer Lukas Birk began collecting photographic material and conducting research on the history of photography in Myanmar. The same year, he founded the first public photographic archive focusing on images taken by local professional and amateur photographers, including Sino-Burmese professionals, the Myanmar Photo Archive (MPA). It contains images from photo studios, private photo albums, official photography, company records, documentary and scientific images, as well as studio accessories, photographic slides and negatives. As of 2023, MPA has produced several exhibitions with materials from their archive comprising more than 30,000 images. Using photographs from the archive, MPA also runs a photobook publishing programme in Yangon.

The archive focuses on the social significance of individual's and families' visual stories rather than the political history of Myanmar. In a 2019 interview with Photo District News, Birk explained that one reason for establishing the archive was the general lack of availability in the country of records of visual culture.

The MPA receives support from the British Library's Endangered Archives Programme and the German Goethe-Institut in Yangon.

=== Exhibitions ===
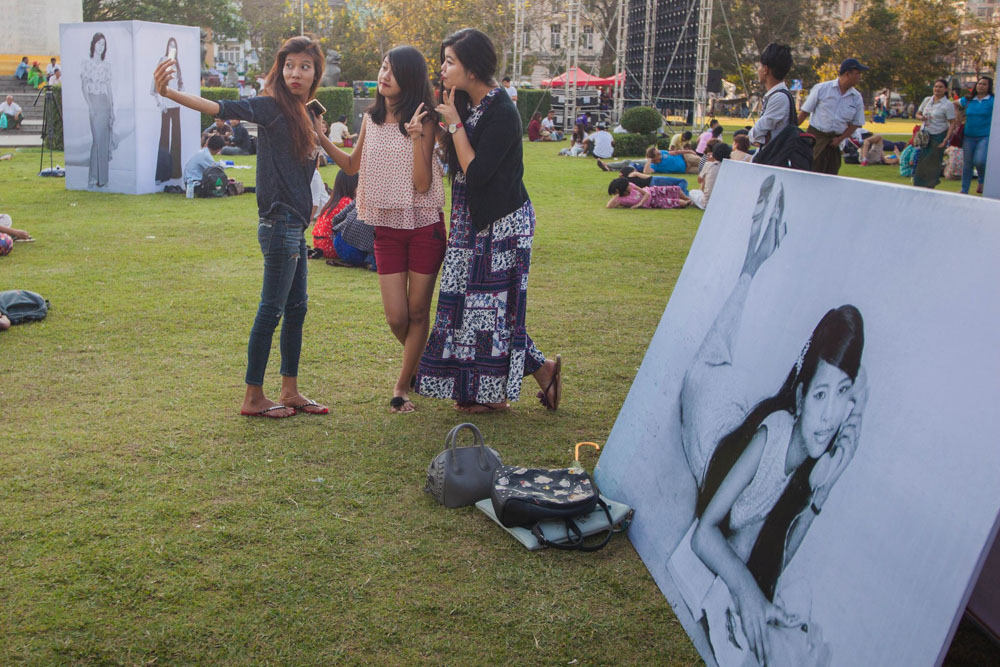
Visitors at Yangon Fashion Exhibition 2017

In 2017 the MPA presented its first public exhibition titled Yangon Fashion 1979 as part of the Yangon Photo Festival in Maha Bandula Park. The exhibition featured larger-than-life images of young people dressed in 1960s and 1970s local or Western-style clothes, that allowed the audience to view how "studio photography provided an opportunity to dress up and share images with friends."

In February 2018, the MPA presented a public exhibition at the historic Secretariat Building for the Yangon Photo Festival. This exhibition titled "Burmese Photographers" presented 300 images and information on the country's history and the development of photography from the colonial era up to the 1970s. These photographs were complemented by the work of contemporary photojournalists in Myanmar, films and a replica of a colonial-era photo studio.

In 2019, the MPA showed reproductions of 25 vintage photos again in Maha Bandula Park. These images had been given to the archive by the daughter of amateur photographer U Than Maung, who had been prompted by the 2018 exhibition, and were later documented in the photobook U Than Maung, the No 1 Amateur Photographer.

=== MPA incubator programme ===
After the 2021 Myanmar coup d'etat, the MPA and the Goethe-Institut started a new programme on 30 May 2023. This programme, "Reinterpret Myanmar's History", provided forty-seven production grants to writers, visual artists, gallery owners, curators and representatives of art organizations to create their own projects inspired by images from the archive. The resulting artworks and literary texts, along with materials from the MPA, are to be presented through online exhibitions, printed materials and physical exhibitions.

== Publications ==
In 2017, the MPA published their first photobook, One Year in Yangon 1978, containing images taken by various historical photo studios in downtown Yangon after the country's independence in 1948. The second publication featured the work of U Than Maung, an amateur photographer who worked both before and after independence. The third volume called REPRODUCED, rethinking P.A. Klier & D.A. Ahuja presented information and the contemporary significance of the widely known images by expatriate photographers Philip Adolphe Klier and D. A. Ahuja during colonial times. The next book, My Universe by BayBay, is a visual diary of the photographer BayBay. Following this, Irene: A Burmese Icon presented photographs from the life of an upper-middle-class woman in Mandalay during the years of Myanmar's military regime in the 1960s and 1970s. The sixth book, Yangon Fashion 1979 – Fashion=Resistance, focused on pictures documenting the fashionable clothes of mostly young men and women in Yangon. All of these publications were designed and published in Myanmar and distributed both locally and internationally.

- One Year in Yangon 1978, Myanmar Photo Archive, Yangon, 2017 ISBN 978-3-9504079-8-3
- Burmese Photographers, Goethe-Institut Myanmar, Yangon, 2018
- REPRODUCED, rethinking P.A. Klier & D.A. Ahuja, Myanmar Photo Archive, Yangon, 2018 ISBN 978-3-9504079-1-4
- U Than Maung, the No 1 Amateur Photographer, Myanmar Photo Archive, Yangon, 2019 ISBN 978-3-9504079-0-7
- My Universe by BayBay, Myanmar Photo Archive, Yangon, 2019 ISBN 978-3-9504079-2-1
- Irene: A Burmese Icon, Myanmar Photo Archive, Yangon, 2020 ISBN 978-3-9504079-4-5
- Yangon Fashion 1979 – Fashion=Resistance, Myanmar Photo Archive, 2020 ISBN 978-3-9504079-3-8

== Critical reception ==
In a 2018 review of the exhibition, Burmese Photographers, Zuzakar Kalaung wrote in the Myanmar Times that the images of "ordinary" Burmese people revealed "a side of modern Myanmar that, until very recently, remained hidden in dusty attics and decaying photo albums, hidden from the country's visual history as we know it." The same year, the Journal of Photography, Theory and Visual Culture, noted that images from the archive brought "the work of local photographers [that] has namely remained unknown until today" into the public view. The Irrawaddy reported on how the show displayed ways in which photographic technology and access changed throughout the decades, and quoted a visitor's comment: "As a young photographer, this event has left me inspired and given me the chance to acknowledge the history of the photography of my country."

An article in Frontier Myanmar in 2019 reported that the "slow, unpredictable and life-affirming qualities of analogue film photography" was gradually being discovered by young people in Yangon who were more familiar with digital and phone cameras. These newer generations were discovering, through the archive's holdings, that by 1910 Burmese photographers documented "their own cultural perspective and lived experience to photography."

In 2019, Photo District News, described the MPA as "currently the only anthology specializing in local Burmese photography and one of the largest collections of Burmese visual identity. It shows the Burmese people, by the Burmese people."

The art historian Nathalie Johnston, who worked in Myanmar from 2012 to 2021, wrote in her 2023 essay subtitled Beh Hma Leh? ('Where Are You?'): The Forgotten Stories of Ordinary Lives in Myanmar that MPA questions the origination of the images, and how the respective photographers found their subjects to photograph, calling attention to "what happens behind the lens". She asks readers to consider the underlying stories behind the images, and goes on to state that the archive "changed the way photography was valued, collected, and exhibited in Myanmar, and it will be so for years to come."
