= Sean Foley (ethnographer) =

Irish ethnographer

Sean Foley is an Irish ethnographer specialising in visual anthropology. He works as a researcher on art projects. Foley has made ethnographic films on mortuary workers in India, tourism in Pakistan and Afghanistan, and cultural ecology in the south of Greece. He is best known for his research work on Afghan Box Camera photography.

== Kafkanistan ==
Foley worked alongside Austrian artist Lukas Birk on a film on tourism to Afghanistan. The research was published under the title Kafkanistan in 2012. Foley also produced a short film titled Kafkanistan as well.

== Afghan box-camera project ==
Foley and Birk investigated the history of the last working box camera photographers practising in Afghanistan and Peshawar, Pakistan. The research resulted in an online archive, the book Afghan Box Camera (Dewi Lewis, UK, 2013) and the book Photo Peshawar (PIX, India, 2017). They first published the terms Afghan Box Camera and Kamra-e-Faoree, two descriptions for Box Camera photography in Afghanistan that have become common terms in the photography world. They also published open-source films and a ‘how to build an Afghan Box Camera’ manual.

== Publications ==
- Kafkanistan Lukas Birk and Sean Foley. Glitterati Inc., USA, 2012. ISBN 978-0985169626
- Afghan Box Camera Lukas Birk and Sean Foley. Dewi Lewis Publishing, United Kingdom, 2013. ISBN 978-1907893360
- Photo Peshawar Sean Foley and Lukas Birk. Pix Publishing, India, 2017. ISBN 978-9385360466
