= Harri Pälviranta =

Finnish visual artist

Harri Pälviranta (born 1971 in Tampere, Finland) is a visual artist who uses mostly photography but also moving images and archival approach. Pälviranta is also a researcher, who specializes in photography studies and theories of documentary.

== Career ==
Pälviranta started his academic studies in 1993 at the Tampere University, majoring in political sciences. In 1996, he moved to Turku to study photography at the Turku Arts Academy and received his BFA in 2000. In 2002, he started studying media studies at the University of Turku, receiving MA in 2005. In 2007 he moved to Helsinki to work on his doctoral thesis at the Aalto University, and he successfully defended the thesis (EXPERIENCING REALITY IN AN ART EXHIBITION. Encountering violence-related documentary photography in a gallery context) in 2012, earning a Doctor of Arts degree.

Pälviranta's artworks have been widely exhibited in Finland and internationally, for instance, featured in institutions and galleries such as the National Museum of Contemporary Art in Lisbon Portugal, Fotomuseum Winterthur in Switzerland, Deichtorhallen in Hamburg Germany, Latvian Museum of Photography in Riga Latvia, The MAC in Belfast Northern Ireland, Museo de Arte Contemporaneo in Madrid Spain, as well as in Institute Camões in Lisbon Portugal.

His works are part of collections such as the Finnish State Art Commission, Contemporary Art Museum Kiasma, Finnish Museum of Photography, Tampere Art Museum, Centro de Fotografía Isla de Tenerife and WAM Turku City Art Museum. As a young artist, Pälviranta was awarded the PhotoEspana Discovery Award in 2007.

== Selected series ==
Pälviranta's work often deals with issues of violence. According to Pälviranta, violence is "a diverse practice: it can be seen as subjective and objective, and it can take both symbolic and systemic forms". In his artworks, he has touched on issues such as street violence, school shootings, gun violence, and the aesthetics of violence.

=== Battered (2007) ===
Battered is a series photographed in 2006–2007 in Finland. It focuses on banal street violence. In Battered, Pälviranta wishes to show the real faces of person-to-person violence. The series consists of 35 portraits of battered people.

=== News Portraits (2014) ===
News Portraits depict the perpetrators of the 10 most fatal school shootings from 1999 until 2014.

=== The Price of Our Liberty (2019) ===
The Price of Our Liberty deals with the question of the blood offering. The series is based on a book published in 1941, also titled Vapautemme hinta. Pälviranta scanned all the 26 662 fallen soldiers presented in the book and reworked the pictures into an artwork.

=== Choreography of Violence (2020) ===
Choreography of Violence approaches violent person-to-person behavior from the perspective of a collection of historical press photos.

=== Wall Tourist (2022) ===
During the years 2016-2021, Pälviranta travelled to twelve countries on five continents to photograph the border walls and fences.

== Books ==
- Toden tuntua galleriassa: Väkivaltaa käsittelevän dokumentaarisen valokuvataiteen merkityksellistäminen näyttelykontekstissa / Experiencing Reality in an Art Exhibition. Doctor of Arts Dissertation. Helsinki: Aalto Arts Books ja Musta Taide 2012. ISBN 978-952-60-4794-2
- News Portraits. Paris: Èditions Bessard 2017.
- Wall Tourist. Stockholm: kult books 2022. ISBN 978-91-987606-1-3
- Battered. Stockholm: kult books 2022. ISBN 978-91-987606-2-0
