= Street box camera =

Camera

The street box camera or kamra-e-faoree is a handmade wooden camera. It is both a camera and a darkroom in one. The term Kamra-e-faoree comes from Dari where it means ‘instant camera’.

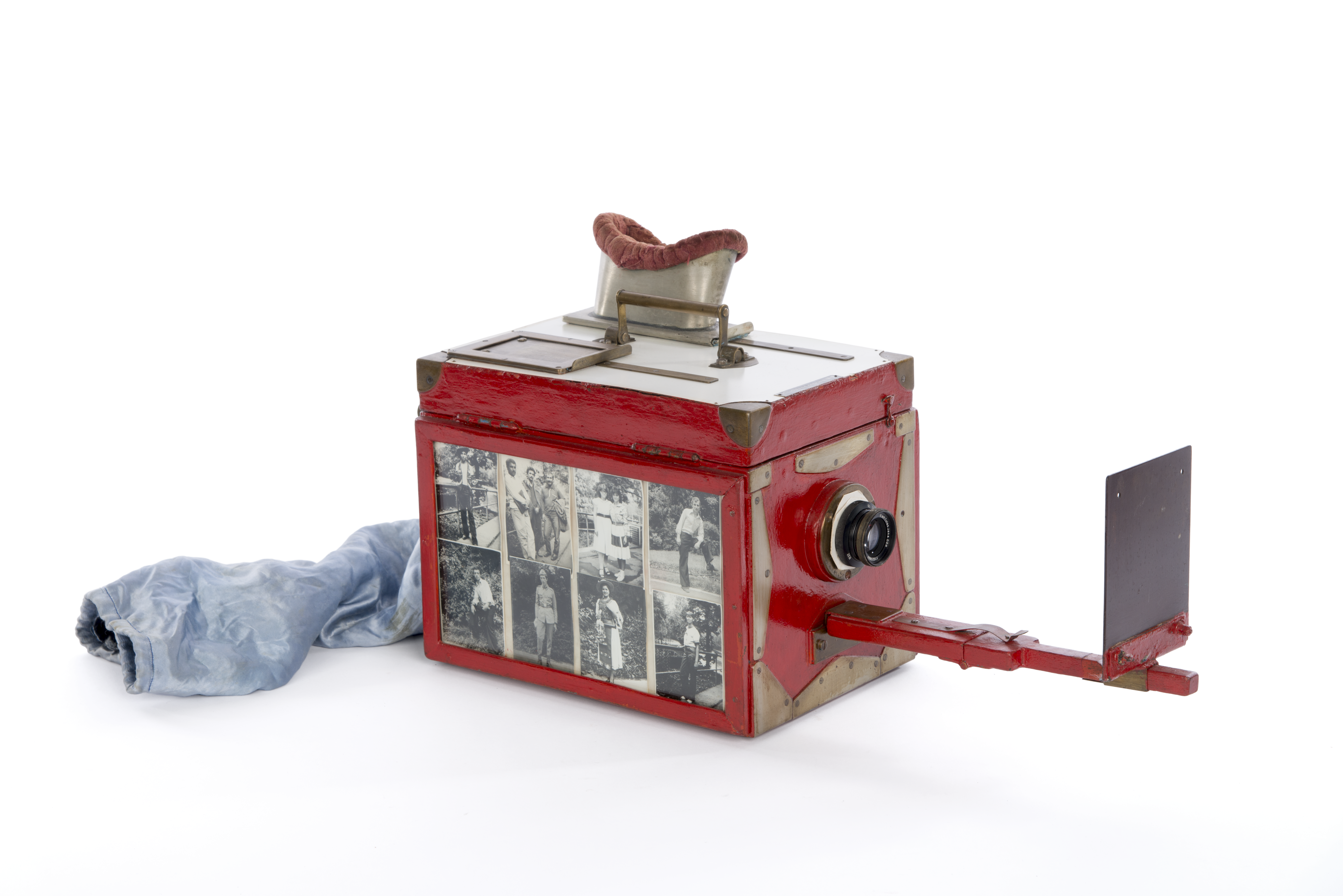
Street Box Camera from Romania – Collection Fotomuseum Antwerpen

== History ==
This type of camera was first used in small towns and villages where there were no photographic studios. These places were visited by travelling photographers that would improvise a studio on the spot .

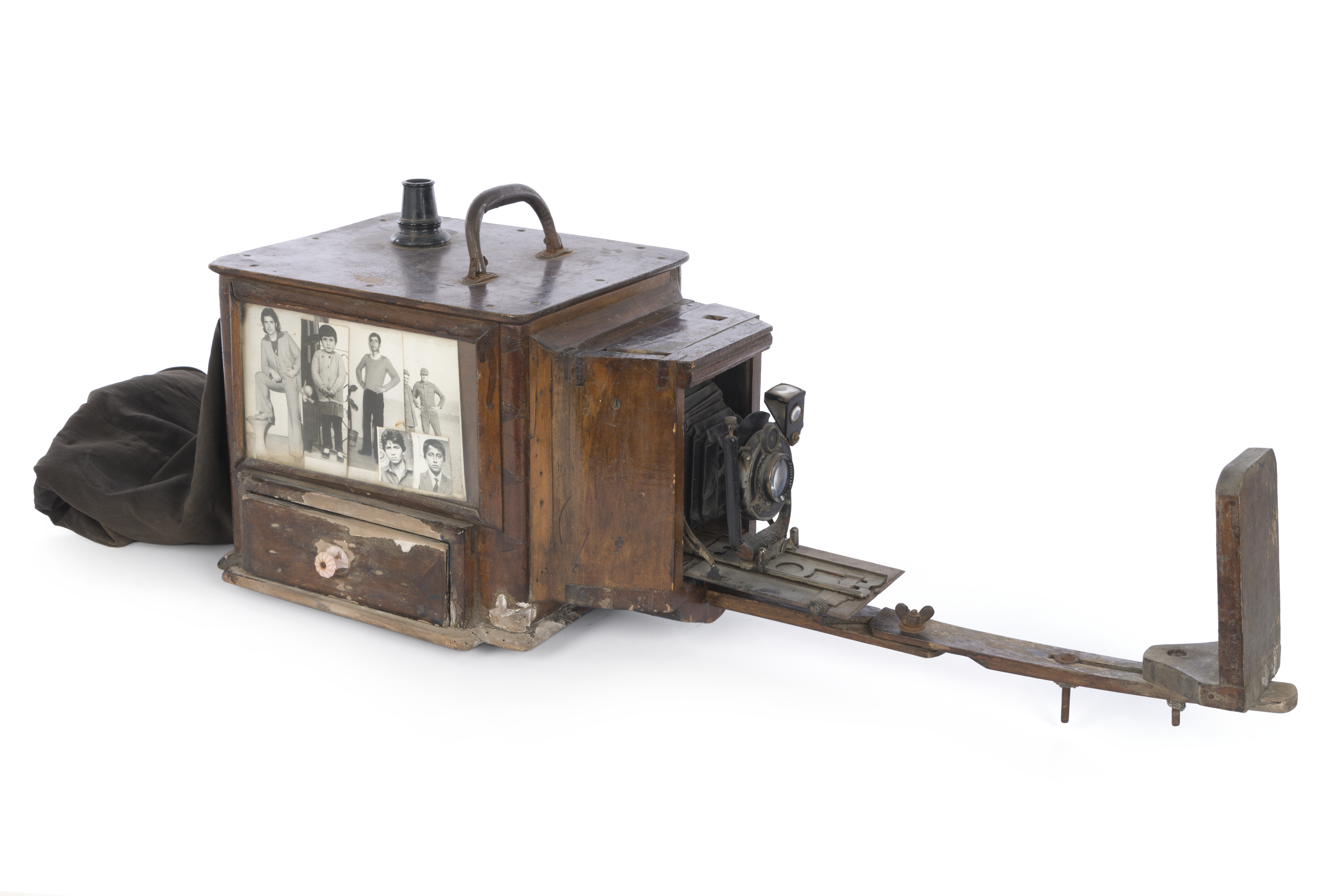
Street box camera from Istanbul, Turkey – Collection Fotomuseum Antwerpen

After the First World War street box cameras became increasingly popular in big cities. Most of these street photographers had a fixed spot outdoors near touristic hot spots. They lured passengers to get their portrait taken at the spot. The photos were developed right away and the picture was ready within a couple of minutes. That is why in Spanish, these street photographers are called Minuteros.

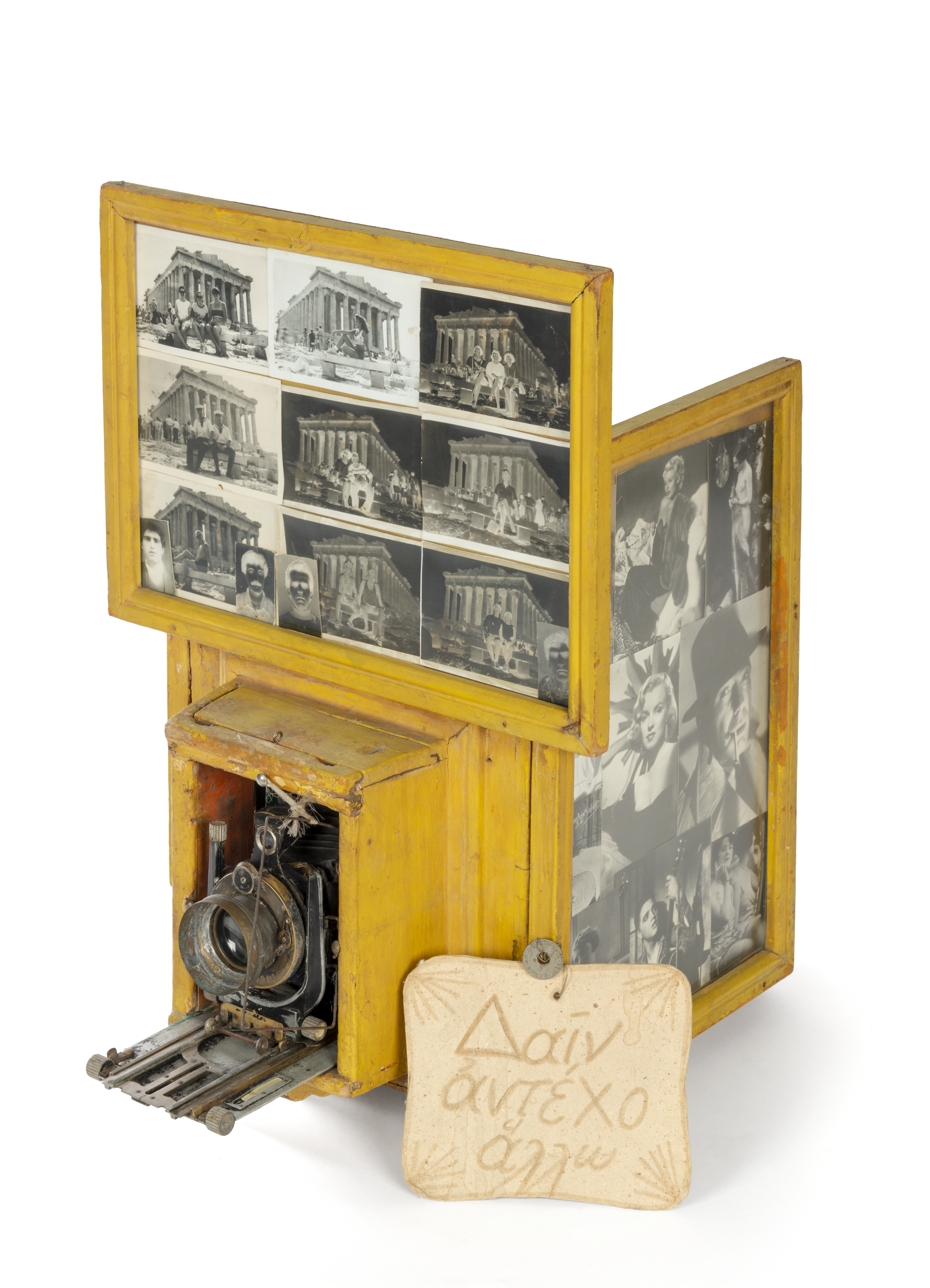
Street box camera from Greece – Collection Fotomuseum Antwerpen

== Technical details ==
The cameras were often built by the photographers themselves, and this resulted in unique designs emerging in each country.

Generally speaking the camera composes of a wooden box with a simple lens mounted in front. Often a complete folding camera is built into the front. In the back inside of the box, a sheet of photographic paper is mounted for exposure. To process the picture the photographer sticks his hand in an opening with a sleeve that prevents light from entering. Inside the box there is room for an improvised lab where the sheet of paper is developed and fixed in simple containers. The rinsing is done in a bucket of water. The pictures are taken on photographic paper and not film, because the latter would be more time-consuming to develop and requires an indoor lab. After development you get a negative image. This negative image is put on a holder attached to the front of the camera and a new photo is taken of the same image. The complete in-tank process is repeated and the result is a regular, positive image.

== Current use ==
Generations of people living in small town villages have had their portrait taken while sitting in front of a Kamra-e-faoree, but a significant decline has happened since the 21st century due to digital photography. Nowadays the street box camera is only used in touristic hot spots all across the world.

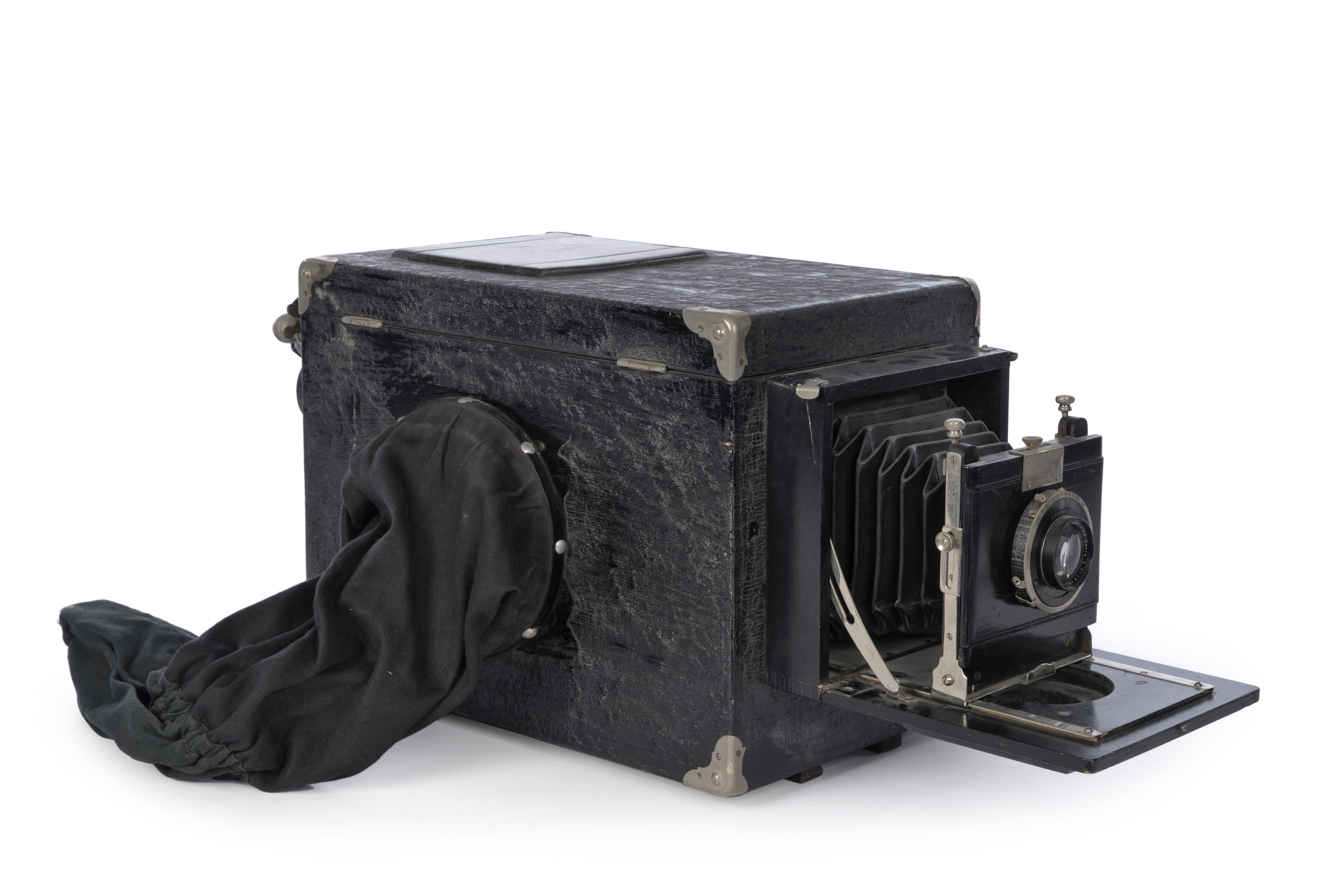
Street box camera from the USA – Collection Fotomuseum Antwerpen

== External links and Publications ==
=== Publications ===
- Afghan Box Camera, Lukas Birk & Sean Foley. Dewi Lewis Publishing, 2013. ISBN 978-1-907893-36-0
- Smudgers, Chris Wroblewski, Selfpublished, 2003.
- Photographes de Rue. Street photographers. Minuteros, Ghnassia, Patrick, Zilmo de Freitas. Mialet, Katar press, 2003.
- 2 MISSISSIPPI, Hans Zeeldieb. Edition Le Mulet, 2019.
- Los Ambulantes: The Itinerant Photographers of Guatemala, Avon Neal & Ann Parker, The MIT Press, 1984. ISBN 978-0262660532
