= Suomen Kuvalehti =

Weekly Finnish magazine

- Editor: Matti Kalliokoski
- Categories: News magazine
- Frequency: Weekly
- Circulation: 79,275 (2013)
- Founded: 1873; 153 years ago
- Company: Otava
- Country: Finland
- Based in: Helsinki
- Language: Finnish
- Website: www.suomenkuvalehti.fi
- ISSN: 0039-5552

Suomen Kuvalehti (lit. 'Finland's picture magazine' or 'the Finnish picture magazine') is the leading Finnish language news magazine featuring politics and culture. It is published weekly in Helsinki, Finland. Suomen Kuvalehti and its reporters have received multiple awards for their feature journalism.

== History and profile ==
Suomen Kuvalehti was founded in 1873 and published until the year 1880. The magazine started publishing again in 1917, and continues to this day. It was merged with Kansan Kuvalehti in 1934. The editor in 1935 was L.M. Viherjuuri. Ilmari Turja edited the magazine from 1936 to 1951.

The headquarters of Suomen Kuvalehti is in Helsinki. Otava publishes the magazine, every Friday. One of its former editor is Ville Pernaa.

Suomen Kuvalehti originally supported center-right politics in the country. In the aftermath of the Finnish Civil War, from which Finland emerged as an independent, democratic republic, the magazine valorized the victorious Whites as patriots and heroes. It also published Vapautemme hinta, a book detailing Finnish losses during the Winter War and like the vast majority of the Finnish press strongly favored the Finnish government against the Soviet invasion of Finland. During the Cold War period it was one of the Finnish publications which were accused by the Soviet Union of being the instrument of US propaganda, and the Soviet Embassy in Helsinki frequently protested the editors of the magazine.

In more modern times, the magazine has had a conservative and Finnish liberal stance without direct political affiliation. The weekly aims to write in-depth articles about current topics and to provide opinion-shaping editorials. The magazine focuses on news about national and international politics and culture. It is one of the investigative journalism outlets in the country. Diary excerpts of Finnish novelist Antti Tuuri about his visit to Germany between 1992 and 1995 were published in Suomen Kuvalehti. The comic strip Blondie regularly appears in the magazine. In the Jyviä ja akanoita ("wheat and chaff") column, various humorous misprints and grammatical goofs from other magazines and newspapers are printed.

In March 1997 two journalists from Suomen Kuvalehti were arrested in Diyarbakır, Turkey, while reporting about the Kurdish movement in the region.

== Circulation ==
The circulation of Suomen Kuvalehti was 102,000 copies in 2007 and 96,000 copies in 2009. In 2010 its circulation fell to 88,667 copies. The 2011 circulation of the weekly grew to 91,277 copies. But, it fell to 86,786 copies in 2012 and to 79,275 copies in 2013.

Year	Circulation
2007	102,000
2009	96,000
2010	88,667
2011	91,277
2012	86,786
2013	79,275

== Editor ==
- Matti Kivekäs 1916–18
- L. M. Viherjuuri 1918–36
- Ilmari Turja 1936–51
- Primary Rislakk 1952–60
- Leo Tujunen 1961–74
- Jouko Tyyri 1974
- Mikko Pohtola 1974–86
- Pekka Hyvärinen 1987–92
- Martti Backman 1993–96
- Tapani Ruokanen 1996–2014
- Ville Pernaa 2014–2019
- Matti Kalliokoski 2020-

== See also ==
- List of magazines in Finland
