= Photo book =

Book in which photographs make a significant contribution to the overall content

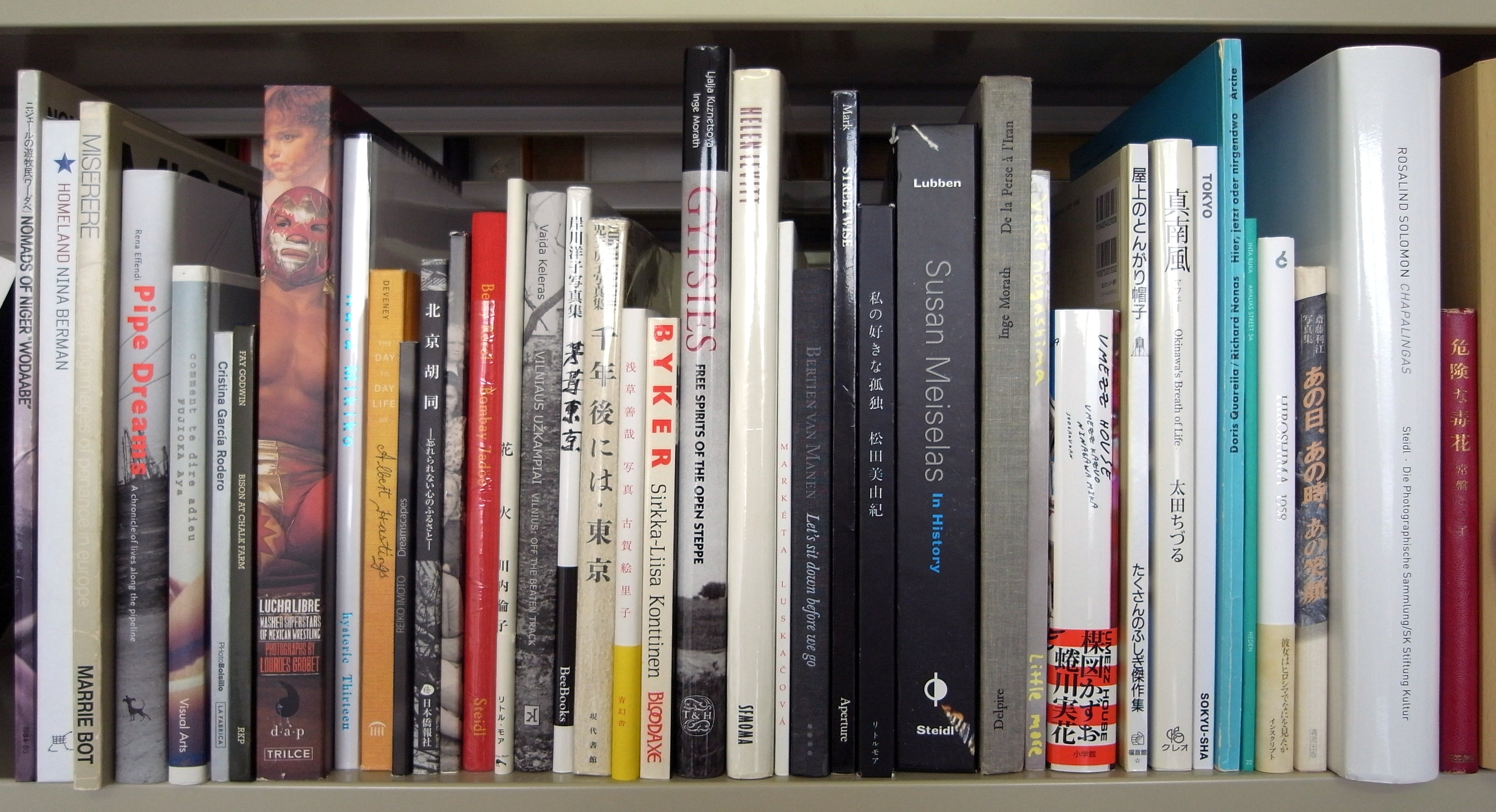
Some photo books

A photo book or photobook is a book in which photographs make a significant contribution to the overall content. A photo book is related to and also often used as a coffee table book.

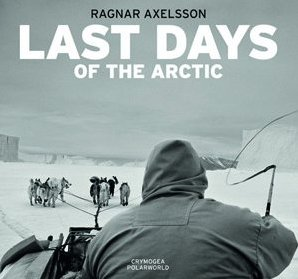
Front cover of a 2010 photo book by Ragnar Axelsson

== Early ==
Early photo books are characterized by their use of photographic printing as part of their reprographic technology. Photographic prints were tipped-in rather than printed directly onto the same paper stock used for letterpress printed text. Many early titles were printed in very small editions and were released as partwork to a network of well-informed and privileged readers. Few original examples of these books survive today, due to their vulnerability to light and damage caused by frequent handling.

What is arguably the first photo book, Photographs of British Algae: Cyanotype Impressions (1843–53), was created by Anna Atkins. The book was released as a partwork to assist the scientific community in the identification of marine specimens. The non-silver cyanotype printing process worked by pressing actual specimens in contact with light-sensitive paper; hence the word "impression" in the book's title.

The Pencil of Nature (1844–46) was produced by William Henry Fox Talbot, who had invented the Calotype photographic process in 1839. Although significant as the first negative/positive photography process, the Calotype was also envisioned as a commercial prospect for the reproduction of images in books through mass publication. Anticipating commercial success, Fox Talbot established purpose-made printing premises in Reading to carry out the reproduction of his book. The Pencil of Nature was released in six parts between 1844 and 1846, to an initially promising list of private subscribers whose numbers dwindled, causing the premature termination of his project.

Julia Margaret Cameron created the first photo book to illustrate a literary work. The 1874 edition of Tennyson's Idylls of the King contained twelve Cameron images that had been specially created, but reproduced as wood engravings. Cameron sought her own publisher, creating a new version of Idylls of the King, containing her original photographs as albumen prints, which came out in December of the same year.

== Japanese ==
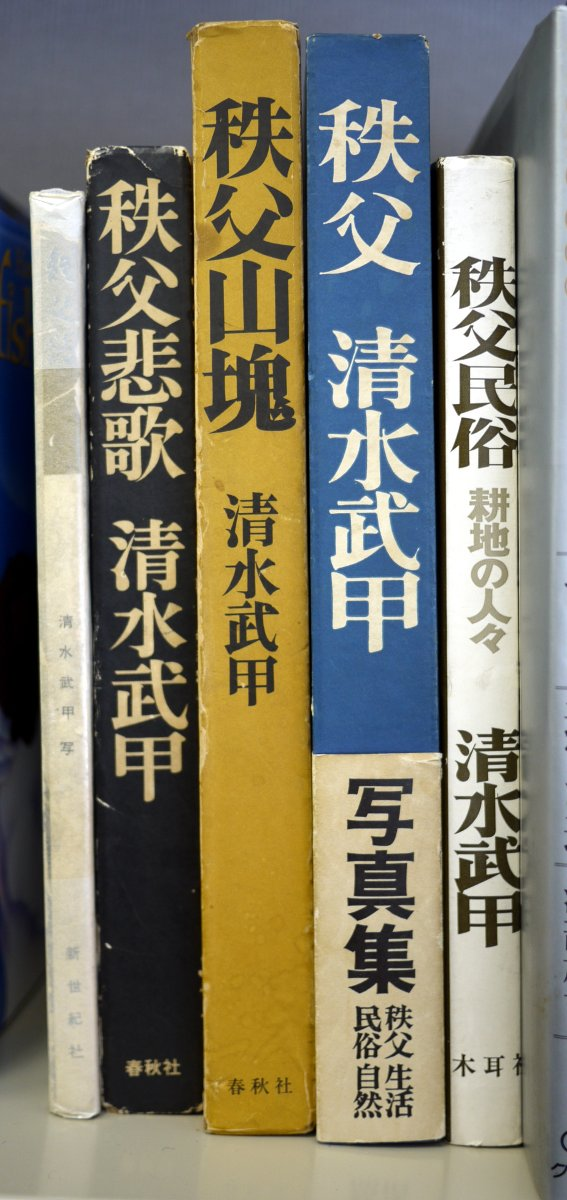
Some photo books by Bukō Shimizu

Photographers such as Shinzō Fukuhara were producing photography books in the 1920s. The postwar years brought low-priced photography books, such as the many volumes of Iwanami Shashin Bunko magazine. From the 1950s onward, most Japanese photographers of note have had photo books published.

The simplest Japanese translation of photo book is shashinshū (写真集), and the shashinshū section of a typical Japanese bookstore displays books of photographs with various levels of documentary or artistic merit. They primarily portray currently popular celebrities in a variety of settings and outfits. Many are of cheesecake models (guradoru), or porn starlets (nūdoru); others are of singers, television personalities, professional sportswomen (often wrestlers) and so forth.

One of the best selling Japanese photobooks of all time, Santa Fe (1991), a fine art nude photo book modelled by Rie Miyazawa and photographed by Kishin Shinoyama, sold 1.5 million copies in the early 1990s.

== Personalized ==
Storing digital images in traditional photo albums means printed copies are inserted in the pages of an album. Companies allow users to create personalized photo books. The resulting book is printed on digital color printers and case bound.

Professional printing and binding services offer easy creation of photo books with professional layouts and individual layout capabilities. Because of the integrated design and order workflow, hardcover bound books with customized pictures and text can be produced very cost-effectively.

Currently there are many photo book software companies who sell licensed solutions to photo labs and print houses so that their customers can create photo books (and other photo related paraphernalia) with ease. These software solutions are available for free download or online access or through apps.

== See also ==
- Myanmar Photo Archive

== Sources ==
- Parr, Martin, and Gerry Badger. The Photobook: A History. London: Phaidon, 2006. Vol 2.
- Parr, Martin. The Photobook: A History. London: Phaidon, 2004. Vol 1.
- Heiting, Manfred, and Roland Jaeger (ed.): Autopsie. Deutschsprachige Fotobuecher 1918 bis 1945. Band 1; Goettingen: Steidl Verlag, 2012.
