= Plus =

Plus or PLUS may refer to:

== Mathematics ==
- Addition
- +, the mathematical sign

== Music ==
- Plus (band), a Japanese pop boy band

=== Albums and EPs ===
- + (Ed Sheeran album), (pronounced "plus"), 2011
- Plus (Astrud Gilberto and James Last album), 1986
- Plus (Autechre album), 2020
- Plus (Cannonball Adderley Quintet album), 1961
- Plus (Martin Garrix EP), 2018
- Plus (Matt Nathanson EP), 2003

== Companies ==
- Plus (autonomous trucking)
- PLUS (Dutch supermarket)
- Plus (German supermarket)
- Plus (interbank network), Visa's ATM and debit card network
- Plus (telecommunications Poland), a mobile phone brand
- Plus Communication Sh.A, a cellphone company in Albania
- Plus Development, a defunct American computer storage manufacturer
- PLUS Expressways, concessionaire holder of majority of Malaysian expressways
- PLUS Markets, a small stock exchange in London, UK

== Media ==
=== Television channels ===
- 5 Plus, a defunct Philippine television channel
- ABC TV Plus, an Australian television channel
- ARD 1 Plus, a defunct German television channel
- Australia Plus, one of the former names of television channel ABC Australia (Asia-Pacific TV channel)
- EinsPlus, a defunct German television channel
- HRT Plus, a defunct Croatian television channel
- Plus (British TV channel), a defunct British television channel
- Plus TV, a defunct Hong Kong television channel
- RTLplus, the former names of RTL (German TV channel) and RTLup
- SBS Plus, a South Korean television channel
- TV Plus (Netherlands), a defunct Dutch television channel
- TV4 Plus, the former name of Swedish television channel Sjuan
- TVB Plus, a Chinese-language Hong Kong television channel
- Venevisión Plus

=== Other ===
- 7plus, an Australian video-on-demand platform
- ABS-CBN TV Plus, a Philippine digital television service

== Other uses ==
- +, the international call prefix
- Microsoft Plus!, a discontinued software product
- Planning and Land Use Services, a division within the South Australian Department of Trade and Investment
- PLUS, abbreviation of the Freedom, Unity and Solidarity Party of Romania
- Plus (cereal), a breakfast cereal range by Australian breakfast company Uncle Tobys
- Plus (novel), 1976, by Joseph McElroy
- Plus (programming language)
- PLUS card, an expansion card type for some Tandy 1000 computer models
- PLUS Loan, a United States Federal student loan
- Plus Magazine, an online mathematics magazine
- Professional Liability Underwriting Society, a non-profit organization
- Promoting Logical Unified Security, a system for rating a building's security
- PALplus, an analogue widescreen television broadcasting system used in European countries

== See also ==
- + (disambiguation)
- Circled plus (disambiguation) (⊕)
- Minus (disambiguation)
- Plus-size (disambiguation)
