= + (disambiguation) =

+ (the plus sign) is a binary operator that indicates addition.

+ may also refer to:

== Computer science ==
- Concatenation, represented by a + in some programming languages
- Operator (computer programming), represented by +, among other symbols
- Plus (programming language), created in 1976

== Media ==
=== Music ===
- + (album) (pronounced "plus"), a 2011 by Ed Sheeran
- _+, the title given to the deluxe edition of _ (album) by BT, 2016
- "+ (Más)" (pronounced "mas"), a 2019 song by Aitana and Cali y El Dandee
- "+", a 2002 song by Ayumi Hamasaki from Rainbow

=== Television channels ===
- ATV+, a Peruvian television news channel
- MGM+, an American premium television network
- TV+ (Gabon), a Gabonese television channel
- Canal+ (France), a French television channel
- Plus Satelital (LATAM) a defunct Latinamerican channel (1991-2006)
- TV+ (Chile), a Chilean television channel
- TVM+, a Maltese television channel
- MTV+(Europe) a defunct European channel
- Plus (TV channel), a defunct British channel
- CNN+ (TV network), a defunct Spanish television news channel
- Timeshift channel(+1)

=== Streaming services ===
- BET+, an American streaming service
- Discovery+, an American streaming service
- Disney+, an American streaming service
- ESPN+, a defunct American streaming service
- NHK+
- Paramount+, an American streaming service
- RTL+
- TVNZ+

=== Other media ===
- HD+, a German satellite television service

== Other uses ==
- The international call prefix used with International direct dialing
- Positive electric charge
- Check (chess)
- + (LGBTQIA+), entry in acronym representing other diversities

== See also ==
- ++ (disambiguation)
- +++ (disambiguation)
- ± (includes section on ∓)
- ⊕ (disambiguation)
- Positivity (disambiguation)
- x (disambiguation)
- Plus (disambiguation)
- Cross (disambiguation)
