= PLU =

PLU or Plu may refer to:

== Organizations ==
- Pacific Lutheran University
- People Like Us (Singapore), a gay equality lobby group in Singapore
- Phi Lambda Upsilon, an honorary chemical society
- Poor law union, in the United Kingdom and Ireland
- United Liberal Party (Chile) (Spanish: Partido Liberal Unido), a former political party in Chile

== People ==
- Benjamin Plu (born 1994), French wide receiver
- People Like Us (musician), stage name of Vicki Bennett

== Transport ==
- Carlos Drummond de Andrade Airport, IATA callsign
- Pierce County Airport, Washington, US, FAA LID
- Plumstead railway station, London, National Rail station code

== Other ==
- PLU (control code), a C1 control code, in character encoding
- Palikúr language of Brazil/French Guiana (ISO 639-3 language code: plu)
- Plew, Missouri, United States (also spelled Plu), an unincorporated community in Lawrence County
- Price look-up code, in supermarkets etc.

== See also ==
- Plus (disambiguation)
