= Negative =

Negative may refer to:

== Science and mathematics ==
- Negative number
- Minus sign (−), the mathematical symbol
- Negative mass
- Negative energy
- Negative charge, one of the two types of electric charge
- Negative (electrical polarity), in electric circuits
- Negative result (disambiguation)
- Negative lens, in optics

== Photography ==
- Negative (photography), an image with inverted luminance or a strip of film with such an image
- Original camera negative, the film in a motion picture camera which captures the original image
- Paper negative, a negative image printed on paper used to create the final print of a photograph

== Linguistics ==
- A negative answer, commonly expressed with the word no
- A type of grammatical construction; see affirmative and negative
- A double negative is a construction occurring when two forms of grammatical negation are used in the same sentence.

== Music ==
- Negative (Finnish band), a Finnish band established in 1997
- Negative (Serbian band), a Serbian band established in 1999
- The Negatives, a band fronted by Lloyd Cole
- Negative (Yōsui Inoue album), 1987
- Negative (Negative album), 1999
- Negatives (album), a 2004 album by Phantom Planet
- The Negatives, a 2014 album by Cruel Hand
- Negative (song), a 1998 song by Mansun
- Negative (album) by Act Of Denial
- "The Negative", song from the musical Waitress

== Other uses ==
- Negatives (film), a 1968 film
- Negative (policy debate) (NEG), the Grayden which negates the resolution in policy debate
- Negative feedback, a feedback loop that responds in the opposite direction to a perturbation
- Negative liberty, freedom from interference by other people
- Negative repetition, the performance of the eccentric phase of weight lifting
- Negative sign, the passive or feminine signs of the zodiac in astrological sign polarity
- Negative space, in art, the space around or between elements of the subject

== See also ==
- Mu (negative)
- Negation (disambiguation)
- Negativity (disambiguation)
- Positive (disambiguation)
- Double Negative (disambiguation)
- Negative test
- Positive and negative (disambiguation)
