= Positive =

Positive is a property of positivity and may refer to:

== Mathematics and science ==
- Positive formula, a logical formula not containing negation
- Positive number, a number that is greater than 0
- Plus sign, the sign "+" used to indicate a positive number
- Positive operator, a type of linear operator in mathematics
- Positive result, a result that has been found significant in statistical hypothesis testing
- Positive test, a diagnostic test result that indicates some parameter being evaluated was present
- Positive charge, one of the two types of electrical charge
- Positive (electrical polarity), in electrical circuits
- Positive lens, in optics
- Positive (photography), a positive image, in which the color and luminance correlates directly with that in the depicted scene
- Positive sense, said of an RNA sequence that codes for a protein

== Philosophy and humanities ==
- Affirmative (policy debate), the team which affirms the resolution
- Negative and positive rights, concerning the moral obligation of a person to do something for/to someone
- Positive economics, in economics, about predictions of behavior of economic actors, as opposed to the normative aspect
- Positive law, man-made law (statutes) in contrast with natural law (derived from deities or morality)
- Positive liberty, the opportunity and ability to act to fulfill one's own potential
- Affirmative (linguistics), a property of a non-negated expression (the opposite of negative)
- Positive (linguistics), the form of an adjective or adverb on which comparative and superlative are formed with suffixes or the use of more or less
- Positive affectivity, the psychological capability to respond positively
- Positive psychology, a branch of psychology
- Positive statement, in economics and philosophy, a (possibly incorrect) factual statement about what is, as opposed to what should be (a normative statement)

== Films and television ==
- Positive (1990 film), a documentary film about AIDS and activism
- Positive (2007 film), a short film in Hindi on HIV and AIDS
- Positive (2008 film), a 2008 Malayalam language film directed by V. K. Prakash
- Positive (TV series), a Filipino drama series

== Music ==
- Positive (Peabo Bryson album)
- Positive (Tofubeats album)
- Positive (EP), the sixth EP by South Korean band Pentagon
- "Positive", a 1994 song by Baboon from Face Down in Turpentine
- "Positive", a 2011 song by Taio Cruz from TY.O
- "Positive", a song from Legally Blonde
- "(Gotta Be) Positive", a song by Eddy Grant from Reparation
- Positive hardcore, a subgenre of hardcore punk
- Positive organ

== Other uses ==
- Positive sign, in western astrology, the supposedly extroverted personalities of the fire and air signs

== See also ==
- HIV-positive people
- Negative (disambiguation)
- Negative (photography), as opposed to positive images used in such applications as slide projection or photo emulsion stencil-making
- Normative
- Optimism
- Positif (disambiguation)
- Positive action (disambiguation)
- Positivism (disambiguation)
- Positive and negative (disambiguation)
