= Double Negative =

Double Negative may refer to:

== In popular culture ==
- Double Negative (artwork), 1969 artwork on the Mormon Mesa in Nevada
- Double Negative (band), hardcore punk band based in North Carolina
- Double Negative (VFX), former name of DNEG, a London-based visual effects facility
- "Double Negative", a single release from British art rock band Grammatics
- Double Negative, 2004 album by Maryland-based The Muffins
- Double Negative: A Vicky Bauer Mystery, a 1988 book by Leona Gom
- Deadly Companion, 1980 film also known as Double Negative
- Double Negative, the fourth album by Steampunk band The Men That Will Not Be Blamed for Nothing
- Double Negative (album), 2018 album by Low

== Science and mathematics ==
- Double negative (DN), T cells, also called CD4–CD8–
- Double negation in logic

== Other ==
- Double negative, concept in linguistics
- Double negative (contract bridge), a type of bid

== See also ==
- Double (disambiguation)
- Negative (disambiguation)
- Negative double, a type of bid within the game of contract bridge, distinct from double negative
