= Decrement =

Decrement may refer to:

- Decrement table
- Logarithmic decrement
- Increment and decrement operators

== See also ==
- Increment (disambiguation)
