= Negativism =

Negativism may refer to:

- Pessimism
- A trait of catatonic stupor
- Antipositivism

== See also ==
- Negative (disambiguation)
- Negativity (disambiguation)
