= +++ =

+++ may refer to:

- +++ (modem), a command to switch from data to command mode in modems in telecommunication, originally by Hayes
- +++ (Leiden), a sign to indicate traces of letters according to the Leiden Conventions
- +++ (Shulgin Rating Scale), a quantification for the subjective effect of psychoactive substances

== See also ==
- xxx (disambiguation)
- ++ (disambiguation)
- + (disambiguation)
