= John McCosh =

Scottish army surgeon and photographer

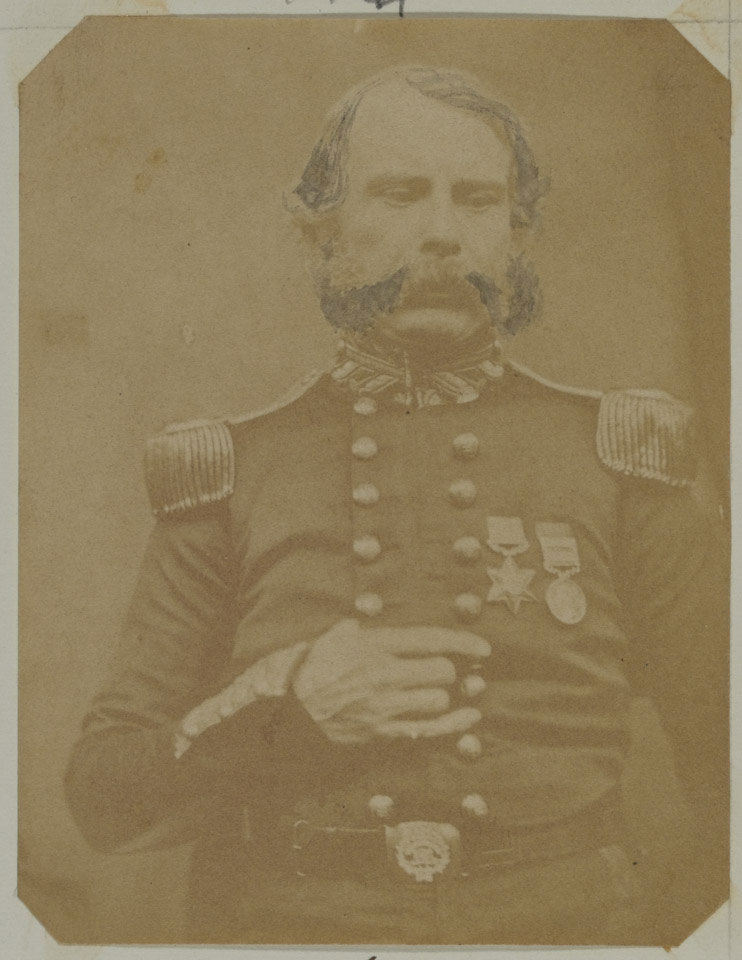
Surgeon John McCosh, Bengal Medical Establishment, India, 1852

John McCosh or John MacCosh or James McCosh (Kirkmichael, Ayrshire, 5 March 1805 – 18 January / 16 March 1885) was a Scottish army surgeon who made documentary photographs whilst serving in India and Burma. His photographs during the Second Anglo-Sikh War (1848–1849) of people and places associated with the British rule in India (for which he is best known), and of the Second Anglo-Burmese War (1852–1853), count as sufficient grounds, some historians maintain, to recognise him as the first war photographer known by name. McCosh wrote a number of books on medicine and photography, as well as books of poetry. John McCosh took the earliest known photographs of Sikhs and their ruler, Duleep Singh.

Roddy Simpson has written of McCosh's photographs that "Given the circumstances, these images are a considerable achievement and, regardless of artistic merit, are historically very important". Taylor and Schaaf have written that "McCosh fashioned compositions that were exceptional for the period" and that unlike his contemporaries "in his hands, photography was not merely a pastime but became the means of recording history."

== Life and work ==
=== Early life ===
In 1831, aged 26, McCosh became an assistant surgeon in the Indian Medical Service (Bengal), in the army of the East India Company, and served with its Bengal Army. He saw active service on the north-east frontier of India against the Kol people in 1832 to 1833.

On 11 October 1833, on sick leave with a tropical disease, the barque on which he was sailing from Madras to Hobart in Tasmania, Australia, (Note: It is referred to as "jungle fever", which is what tropical diseases, such as malaria, were known as.) was wrecked off the desolate and remote Amsterdam Island in the southern Indian Ocean. Of the 97 people aboard, 21 survived, with McCosh the only surviving passenger. They were rescued on 26 October by a US sealing schooner, General Jackson, and taken to Mauritius. He wrote a book describing his experience, Narrative of the Wreck of the Lady Munro, on the Desolate Island of Amsterdam, October, 1833 (1835).

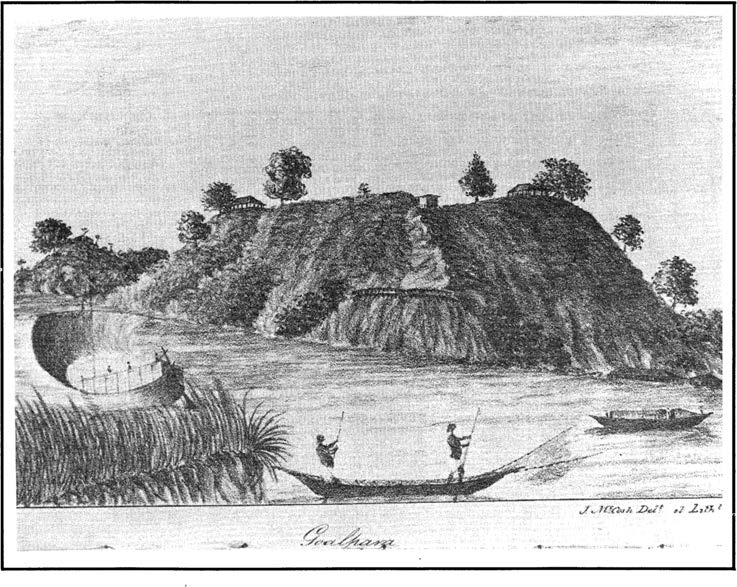
'Goalpara' (1837), lithograph, by John McCosh, from Topography of Assam

In 1840 / 1841 to 1842 he returned to Edinburgh for further training as a surgeon, studying military surgery, surgery and medical jurisprudence at Edinburgh University.

=== Photographic career ===
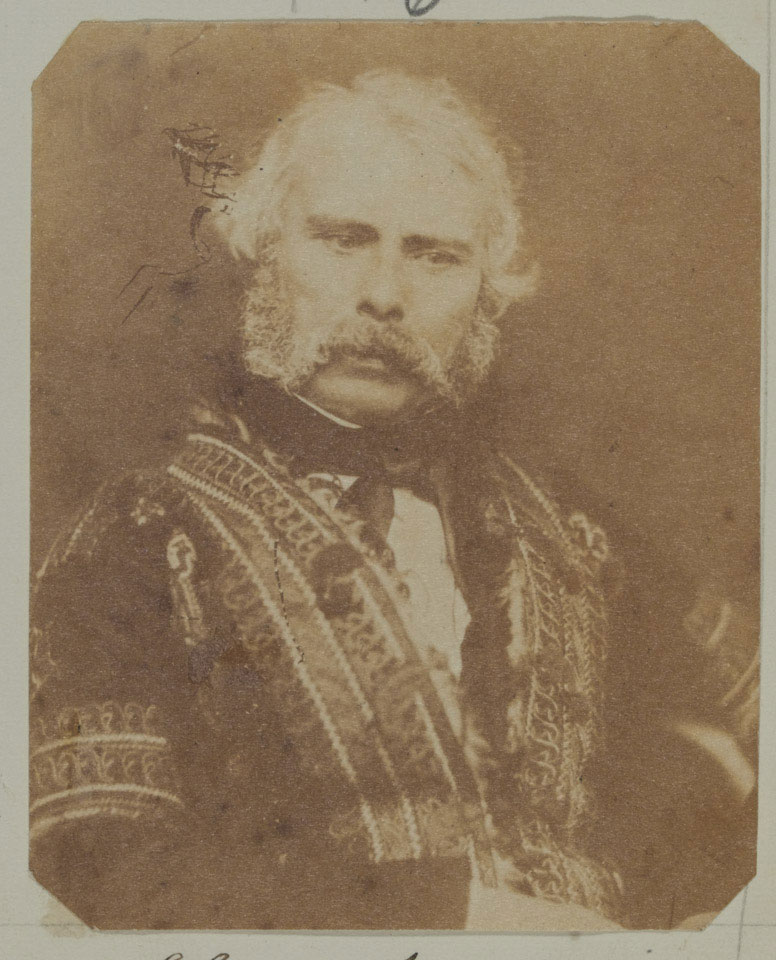
'The Artist McCosh', India, by John McCosh, 1850

In 1843 McCosh returned to India as assistant surgeon with the 31st Bengal Native Infantry, taking part in the Gwalior campaign and its battle of Maharajpur on 29 December 1843. He was awarded the Gwalior Star for Maharajpoor. McCosh began producing photographs either in 1843 or 1848. (Note: Simpson (2012) claims McCosh began producing images in 1843, as does McKenzie (1987), describing one of McCosh's earliest photographs of Lt Stewart who was killed in 1843. However Hannavy (2007) claims his first datable photograph to be from 1848.)

He was sent to Almora, in the foothills of the Himalayas, and to Jalandhar in the Punjab.

In 1848 in the Punjab, he took part in the Second Anglo-Sikh War (1848–1849) with the 5th Battery, Bengal Artillery / 2nd Bengal European regiment, where he was full surgeon. Mostly his photographs were portraits of fellow officers, key figures from the campaigns, administrators and their wives and daughters, including Patrick Alexander Vans Agnew, Hugh Gough, 1st Viscount Gough; the British commander General Sir Charles James Napier; and Dewan Mulraj / Mul Raj, the Diwan (governor) of the city of Multan (a key leader of the Sikh nation against the British). He also photographed local people and architecture. His prints from this period measure no larger than 10 cm × 8 cm and were likely made from a quarter-plate sized camera.

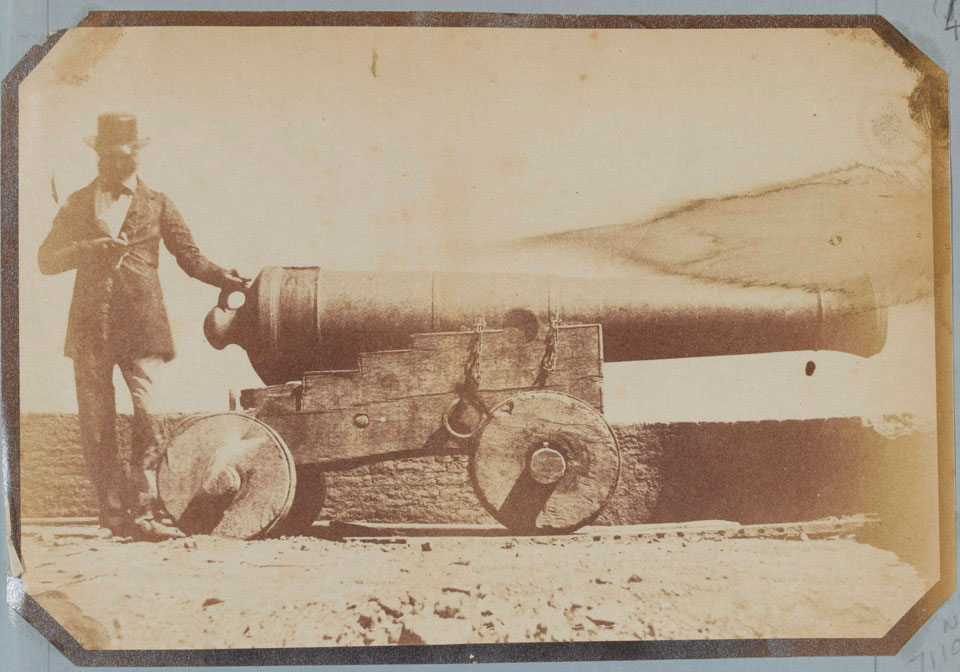
Captured guns after the battle of Rangoon, Burma during the Second Anglo-Burmese War, by John McCosh, 1852

In British Burma, he saw active service in Yangon (known by the British as Rangoon) and Prome. McCosh lived in Burma (now known as Myanmar) during the Second Burmese War (1852–1853), where he made portraits of colleagues, captured guns, temple architecture in Yangon and of Burmese people, using a larger and heavier camera and producing larger prints. According to Taylor and Schaaf, McCosh was there in a "quasi-official capacity to photograph during that conflict". His prints from this period are up to 20 cm × 22 cm, suggesting a camera measuring a whole plate in size.

McCosh took the first photographs of the Sikh people and palaces of Lahore; such as Duleep Singh, the earliest known photograph of Samadhi of Ranjit Singh in 1849. He also captured a photograph of Maharani Jind Kaur, which is now lost, and images of Bikram Singh Bedi (direct descendant of Guru Nanak), and Diwan Mulraj. His fifty photographs of Burma from 1852 are the earliest images of the country to have survived and his were the earliest photographic studies of Burmese people.

McCosh predominantly used the calotype process for his photography, the first practicable negative and positive process, using paper, patented by Henry Fox Talbot in 1841. This process produced a translucent original negative image, a paper negative, from which multiple positives could be made by simple contact printing. McCosh also used the later collodion process, though he also continued with the calotype process for larger prints, because of its fidelity.

=== Later life ===
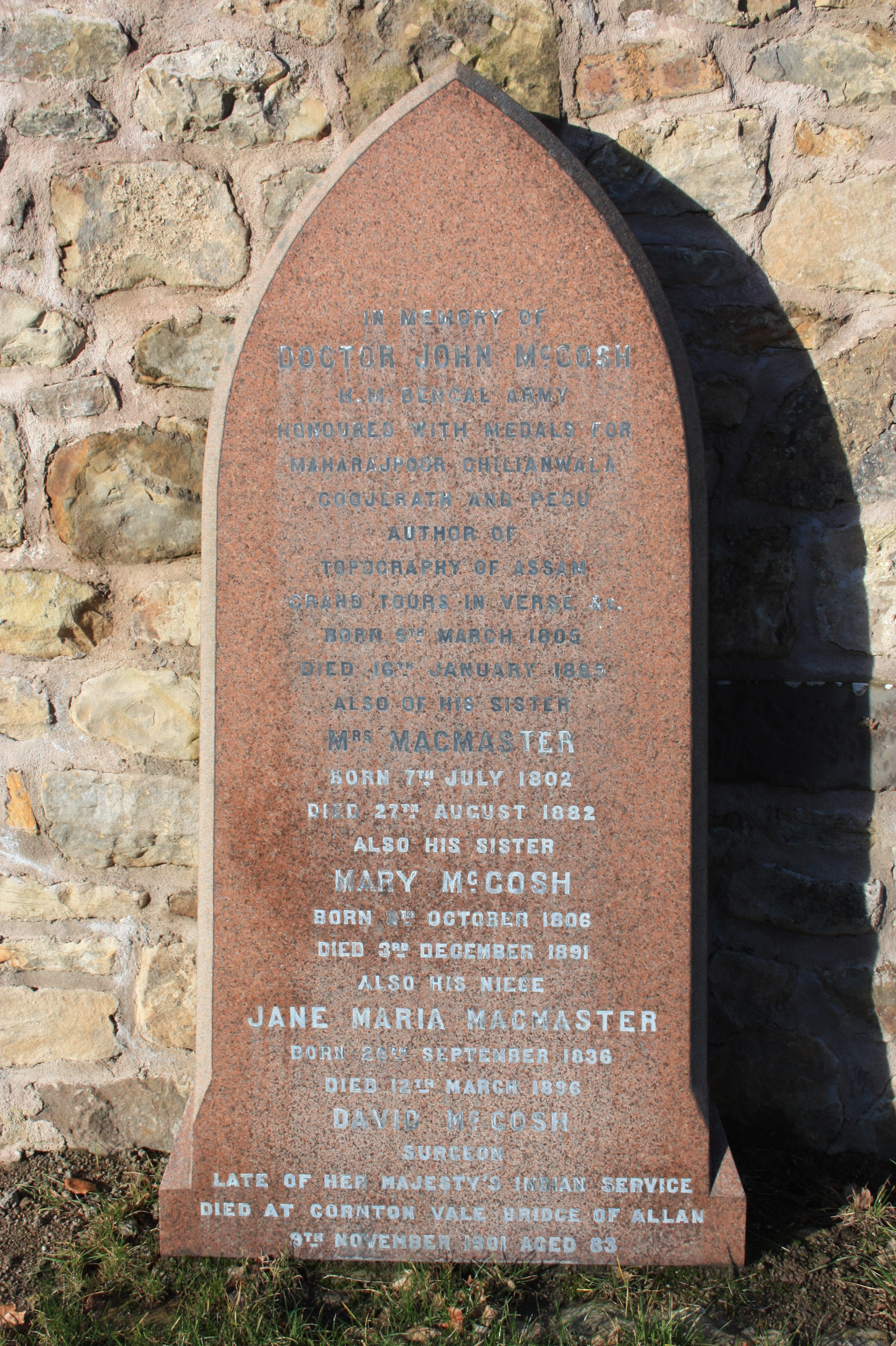
Memorial to Dr John McCosh, Dean Cemetery, Edinburgh

He gave up photography either in the early 1850s, or as late as 1856 and retired from the army on 31 January 1856.

In 1856, McCosh advised assistant-surgeons serving in India to take-up photography:

I would strongly recommend every assistant-surgeon to make himself master of photography in all its branches, on paper, on plate glass, and on metallic plates. I have practised it for many years, and know of no extra professional pursuit that will more repay him for all the expense and trouble (and both are very considerable) than this fascinating study—especially the new process by Collodion for the stereoscope. During the course of his service in India, he may make such a faithful collection of representations of man and animals, of architecture and landscape, that would be a welcome contribution to any museum. The camera should be made of good substantial mahogany, clamped with brass, made to stand extremes of heat. The flimsy, folding portable cameras, made light for Indian use, soon become useless. It is a great mistake to make things light and portable for Indian use, as if the owner himself had to carry them. Carriage for every piece of apparatus is cheap, safe, and abundant. French paper, Canson frères is the best, and does not get damaged by damp so soon as English paper.

— John McCosh, Advice to Officers in India (1856), page 7

In 1862, he became a fellow of the Royal Geographical Society. According to acquisition records, John McCosh deposited the photos he took whilst in Punjab at the Art Library in 1884.

McCosh died in London in 1885. A stone to his memory stands on the north wall of the first northern extension to Dean Cemetery in west Edinburgh, where his siblings are buried.

== Critical response ==
Roddy Simpson, in The Photography of Victorian Scotland (2012), wrote of McCosh that "these photographs do not have significant aesthetic quality, but show the desire to document likenesses. Given the circumstances, these images are a considerable achievement and, regardless of artistic merit, are historically very important". Taylor and Schaaf, in Impressed by Light: British Photographs from Paper Negatives, 1840–1860, wrote that "McCosh fashioned compositions that were exceptional for the period" and that unlike his contemporaries "in his hands, photography was not merely a pastime, but became the means of recording history." Taylor and Schaaf have also written that "the kind of work done by McCosh, [John] Murray and [Linnaeus] Tripe was echoed in a wide pattern of photographic activity throughout India, and in many ways, these three can be regarded as role models to whom others looked for inspiration." ... "Few photographers in the calotype era came close to matching the sustained output of these three, and in visual sensitivity and technical bravado they remain unequalled."

According to Ray McKenzie, John McCosh cannot truly be considered a war photographer because he just happened to take photographs whilst a military campaign was occurring rather than having the intentions to capture a war with photography. Furthermore, McKenzie states that McCosh never snapped images of live combat zones.

== Publications ==
=== Publications by McCosh ===
- Narrative of the Wreck of the Lady Munro, on the Desolate Island of Amsterdam, October, 1833. Glasgow: W Bennet, 1835.
- Topography of Assam. Calcutta: G. H. Huttmann, Bengal Military Orphan Press, 1837.
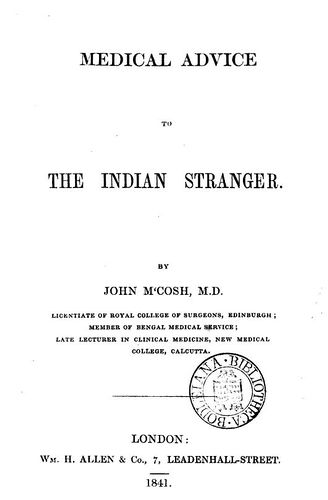
- Title-page of 'Medical Advice to the Indian Stranger' (1841) by John McCosh
  Medical Advice to the Indian Stranger. 1841.
- Advice to Officers in India. Revised edition. London: Wm. H. Allen & Co., 1856
- Nuova Italia, a Poem. Second series. 1875.
- Grand Tours in Many Lands, a Poem in 10 Cantos. 1881.
- Sketches in Verse at Home and Abroad: And from The War of the Nile in Ten Cantos. London: J. Blackwood, 1883.

=== Publications with material about McCosh ===
- The Oxford Companion to the Photograph. Oxford: Oxford University, 2005. Edited by Robin Lenman. Includes a short biography on McCosh.
- Impressed by Light: British Photographs from Paper Negatives, 1840–1860. New York: Metropolitan Museum of Art, 2007. By Roger Taylor with Larry John Schaaf. ISBN 978-0300124057. Includes a profile of McCosh.
- Encyclopedia of Nineteenth-Century Photography. Edited by John Hannavy. Abingdon, Oxford: Taylor & Francis, 2007; London: Routledge, 2013. ISBN 9781135873264.

== Exhibitions with contributions by McCosh ==
- Impressed by Light: British Photographs from Paper Negatives, 1840–1860, Musée d'Orsay, 1 January 2005 – 7 September 2008. National Gallery of Art, Washington DC, 1 March 2002 – 4 May 2008. Metropolitan Museum of Art, New York 31 December 2007 – 31 December 2009.
- First Shots: Early War Photography 1848–60, White Space Gallery, National Army Museum, London, 2009. Photographs by McCosh, Roger Fenton, James Robertson and Felice Beato.

== Collections ==
- National Army Museum, London.
- University of St Andrews, St Andrews, Fife, Scotland.
- Victoria and Albert Museum, London.

== Photograph gallery ==
=== Punjab ===
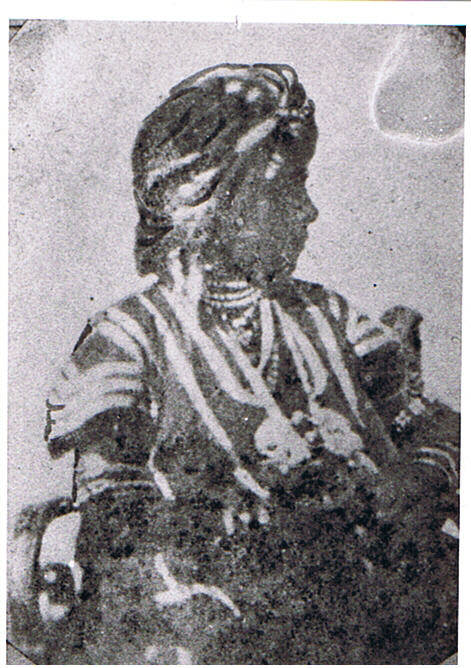
Photograph of Maharaha Duleep Singh during his reign as a child monarch of the Sikh Empire, Lahore, ca.1848

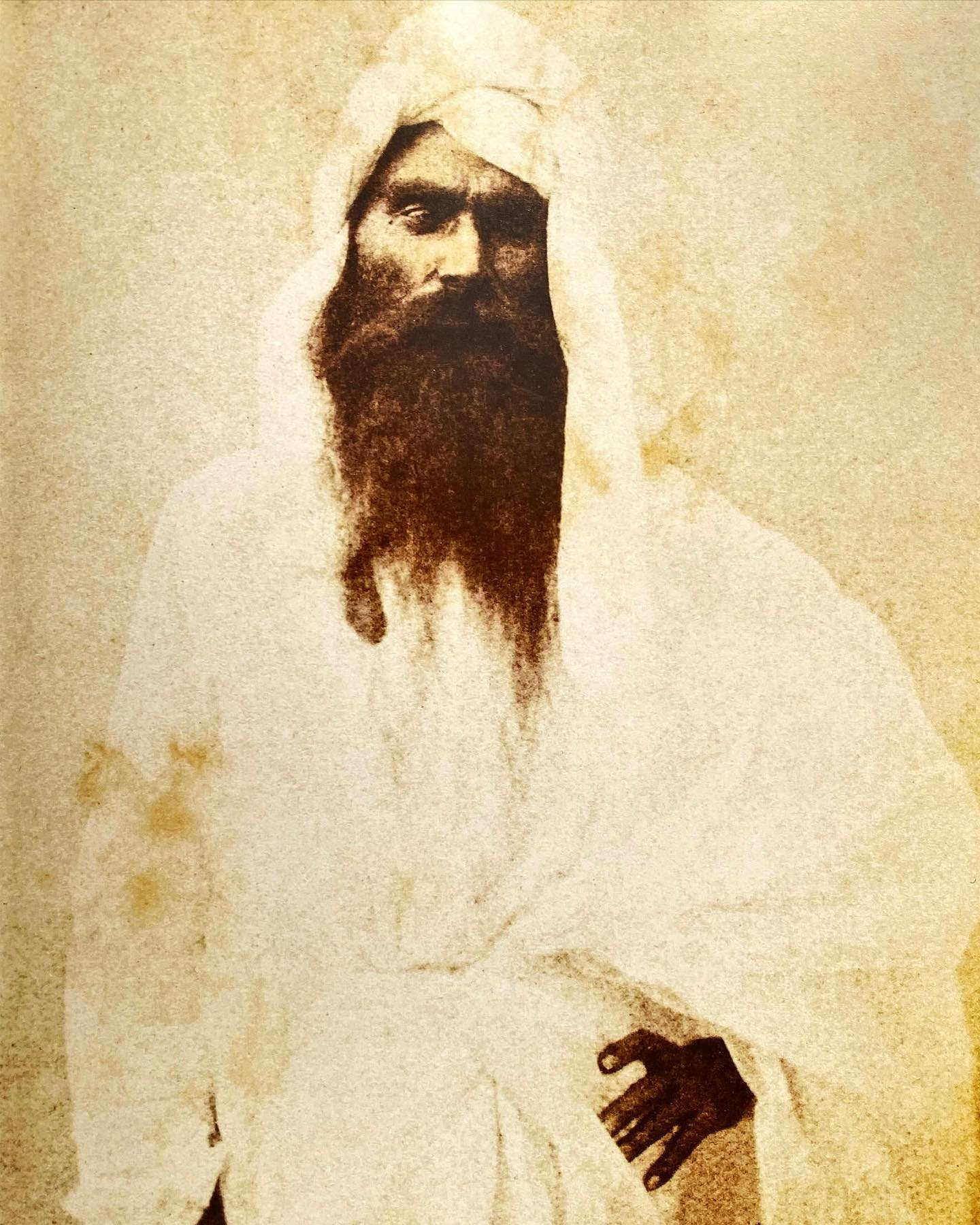
Photograph of Bikram Singh Bedi, a direct descendant of Guru Nanak, ca.1847–1849

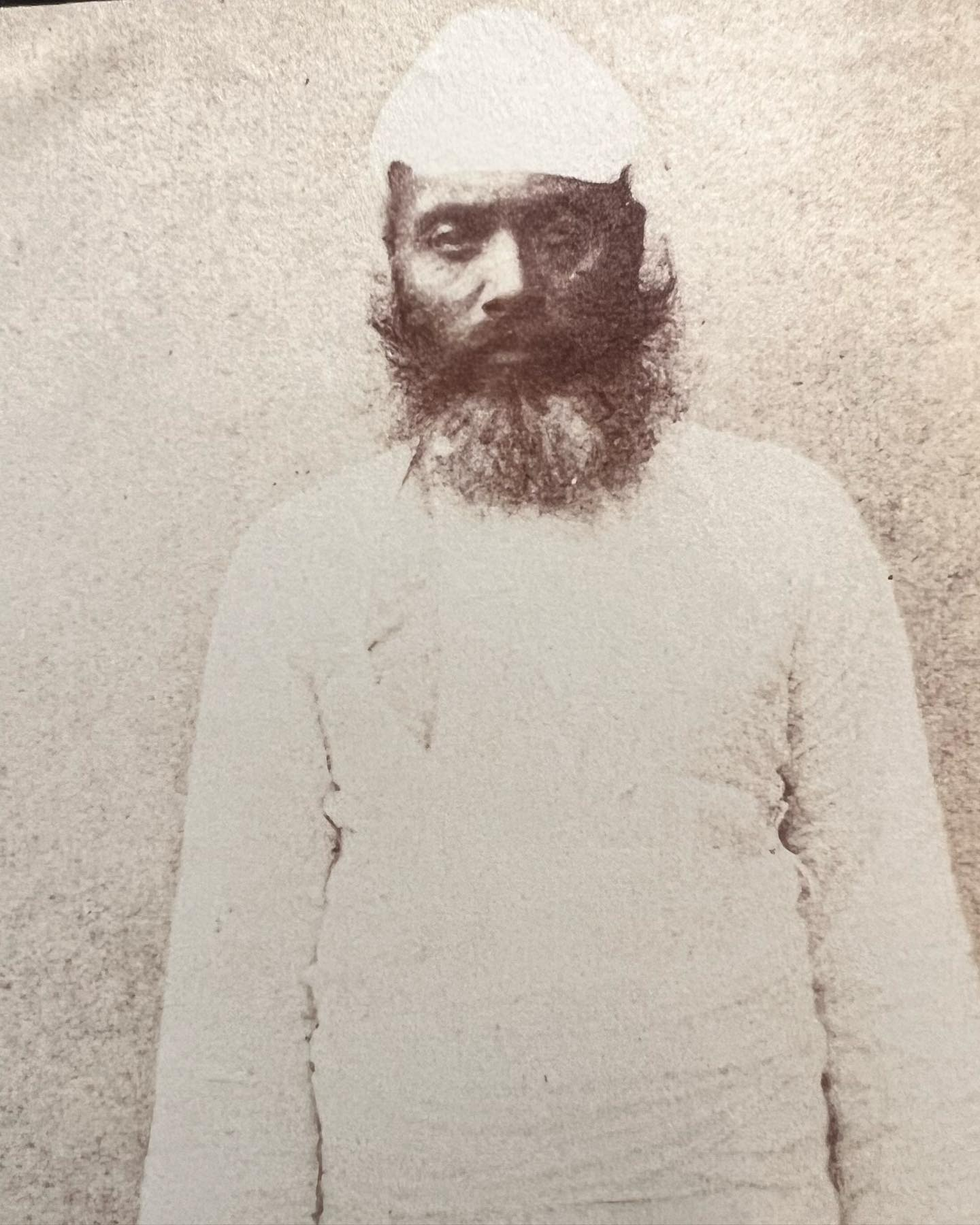
Sikh man wearing a 'sidhi pagh' style of turban, ca.1847–1849

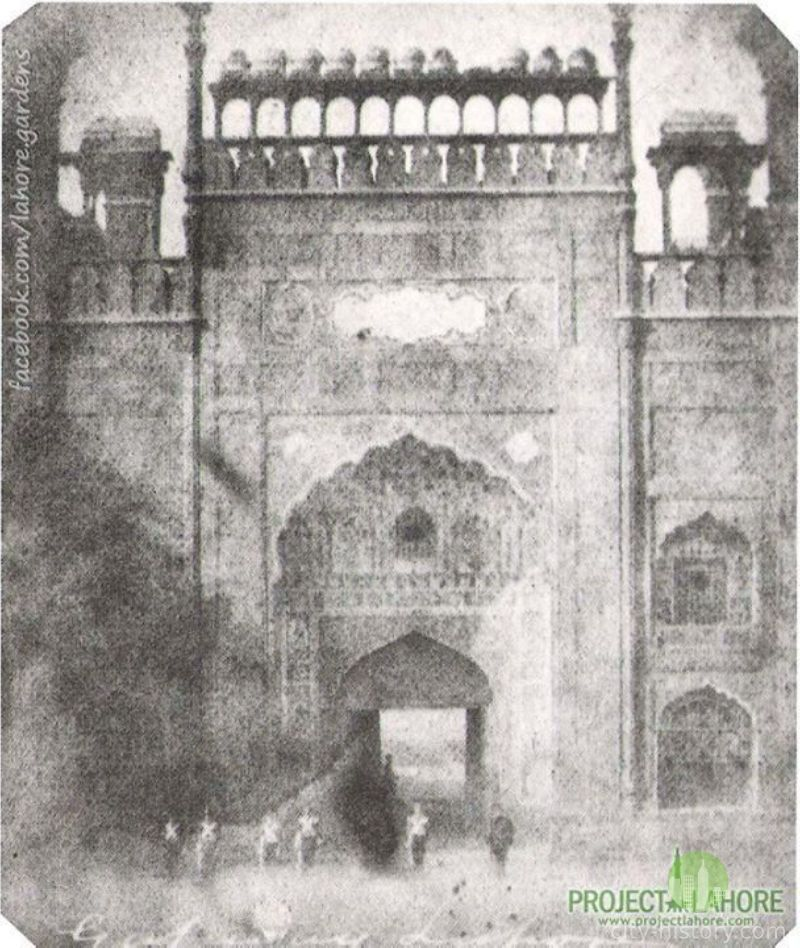
Gateway of Badshahi Mosque in the aftermath of the Second-Anglo Sikh War, Lahore, ca.1849

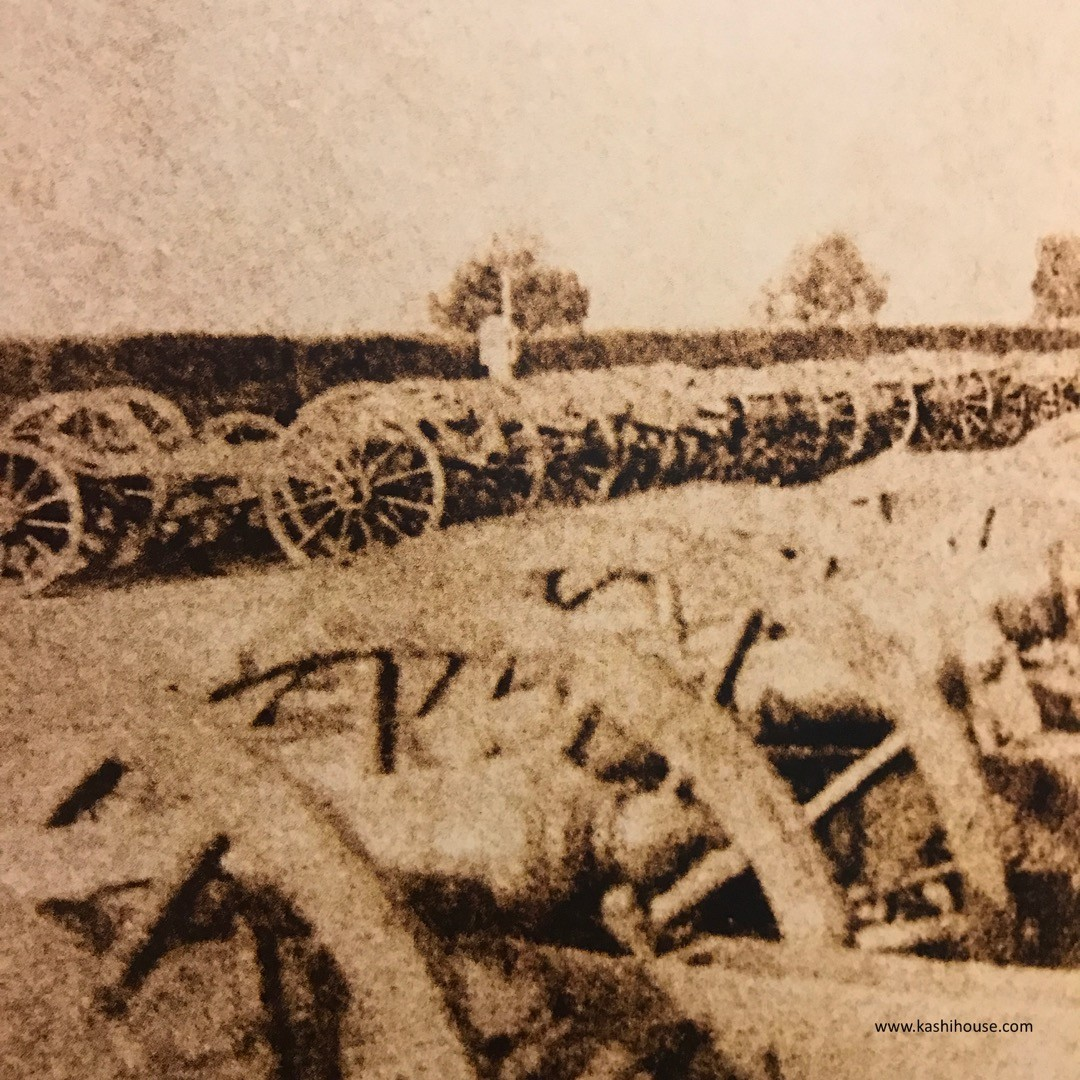
Captured Sikh guns parked in Ambala cantonment in the aftermath of the Second Anglo-Sikh War, circa April 1849

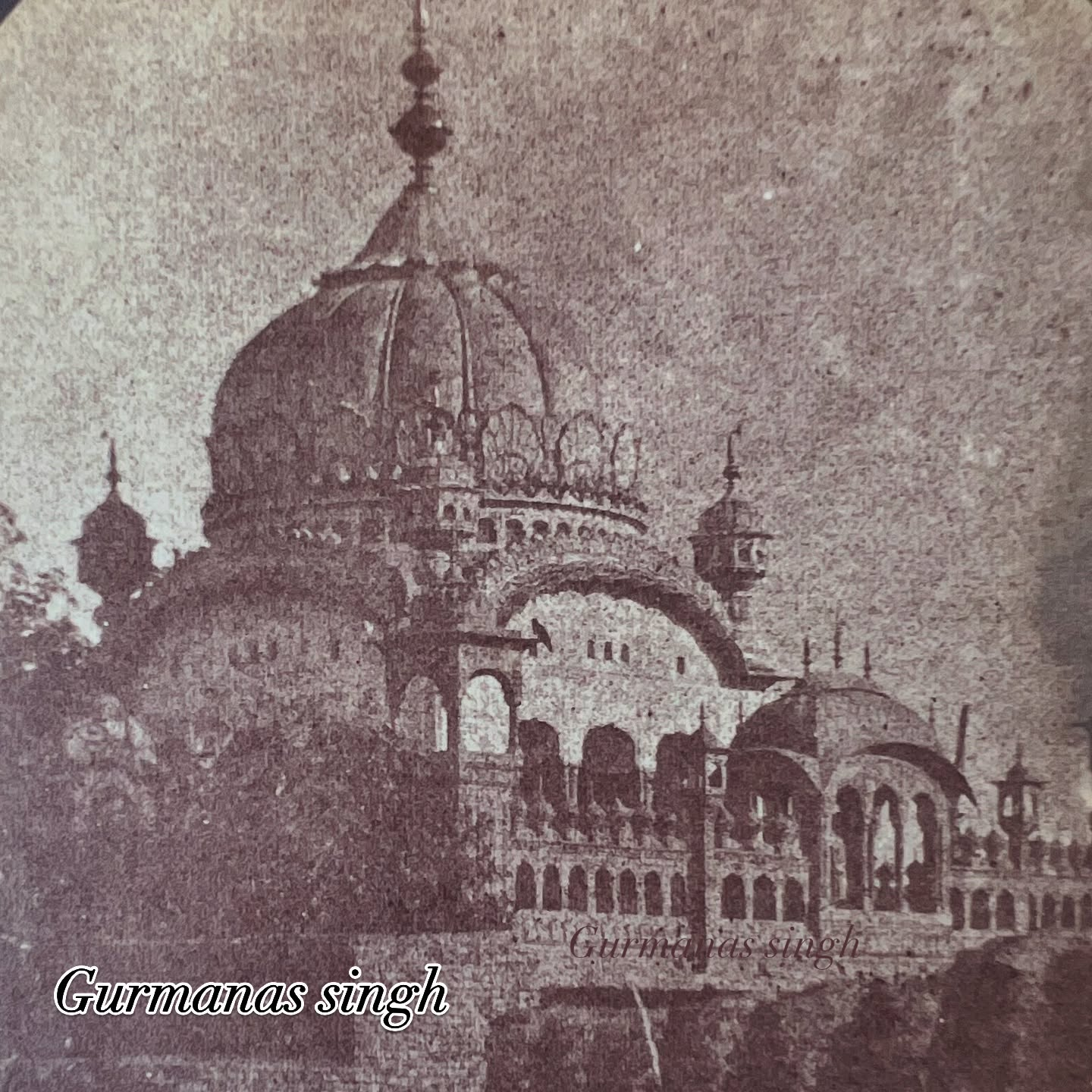
Photograph of the Samadhi of Maharaja Ranjit Singh in Lahore, Sikh Empire, by John McCosh, 1849

=== Burma ===
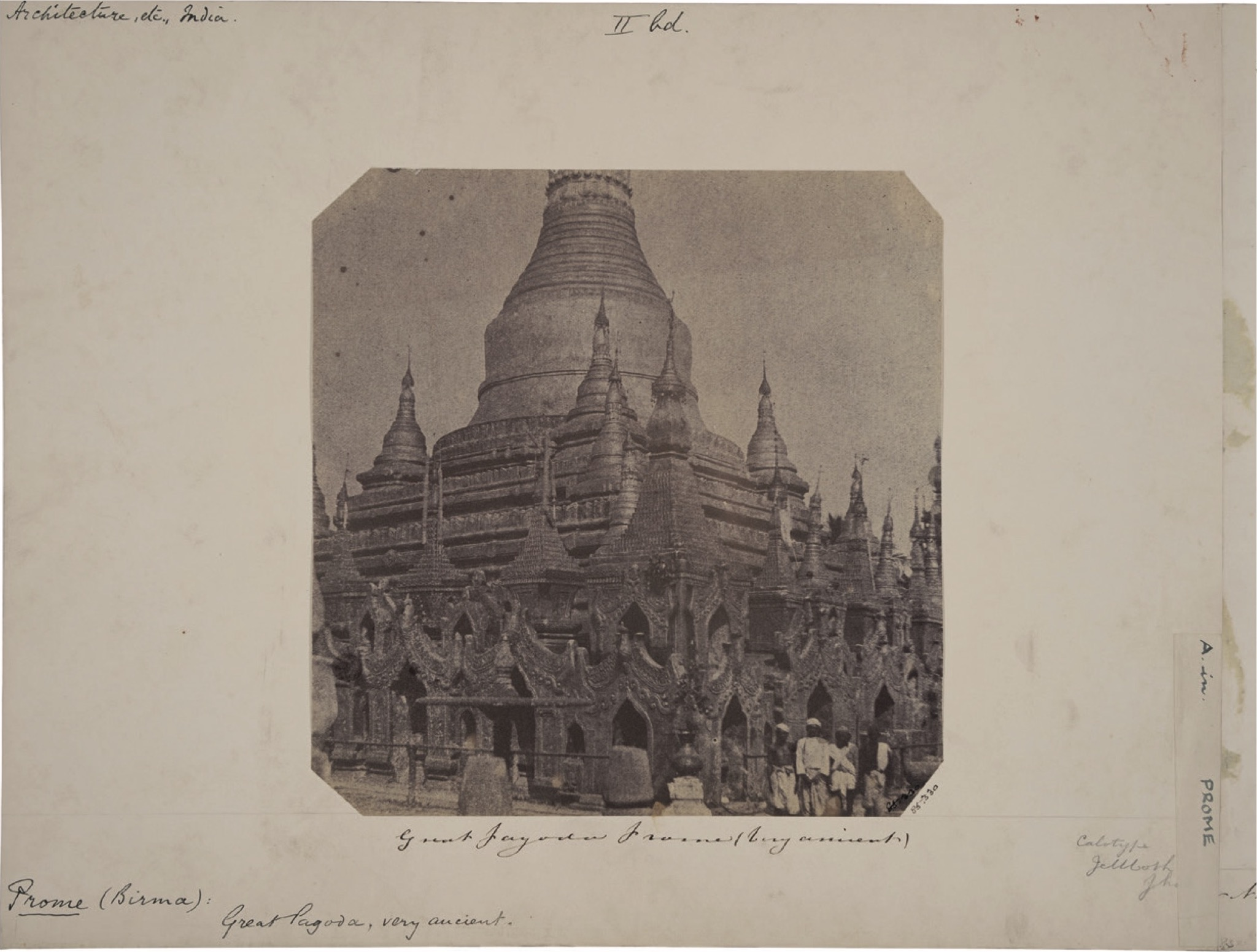
'Great Pagoda Prome (very ancient)', Burma, by John McCosh, 1852.

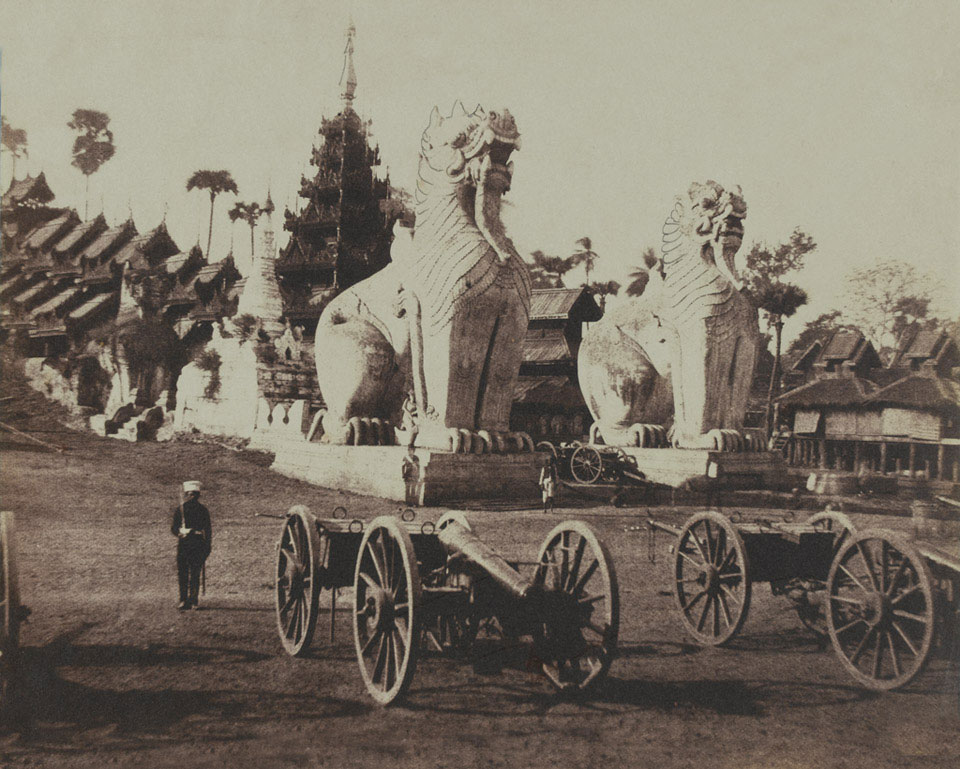
North-east view of the Great Pagoda (Shwesandaw or Temple of the Golden Hair Relic) at Prome, Burma, by John McCosh, 1852

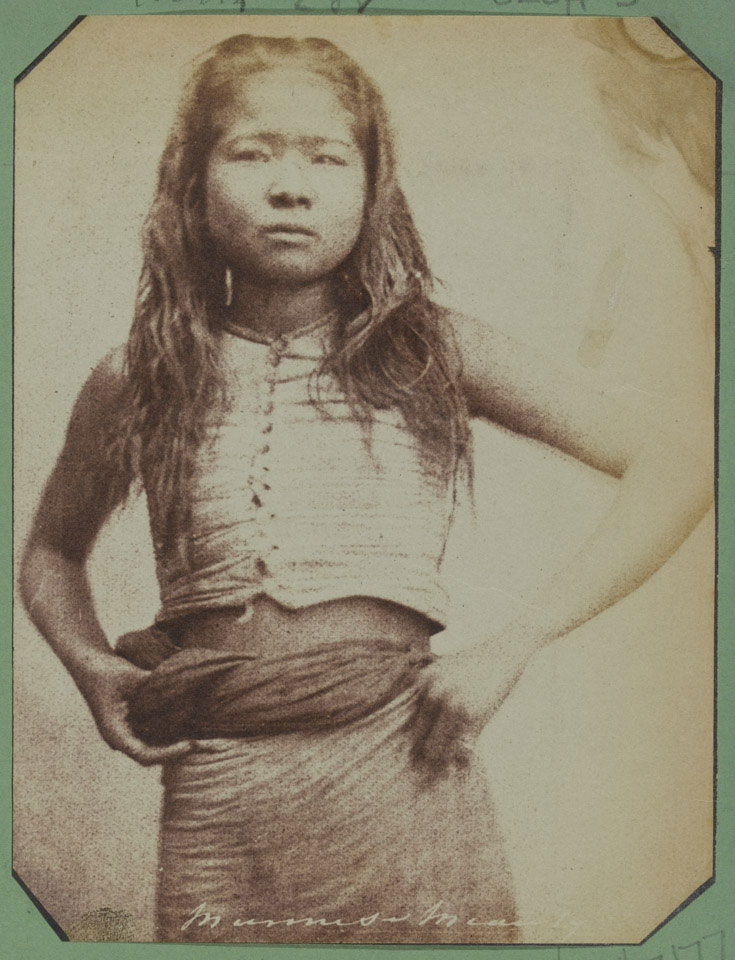
Burmese girl, by John McCosh, 1852

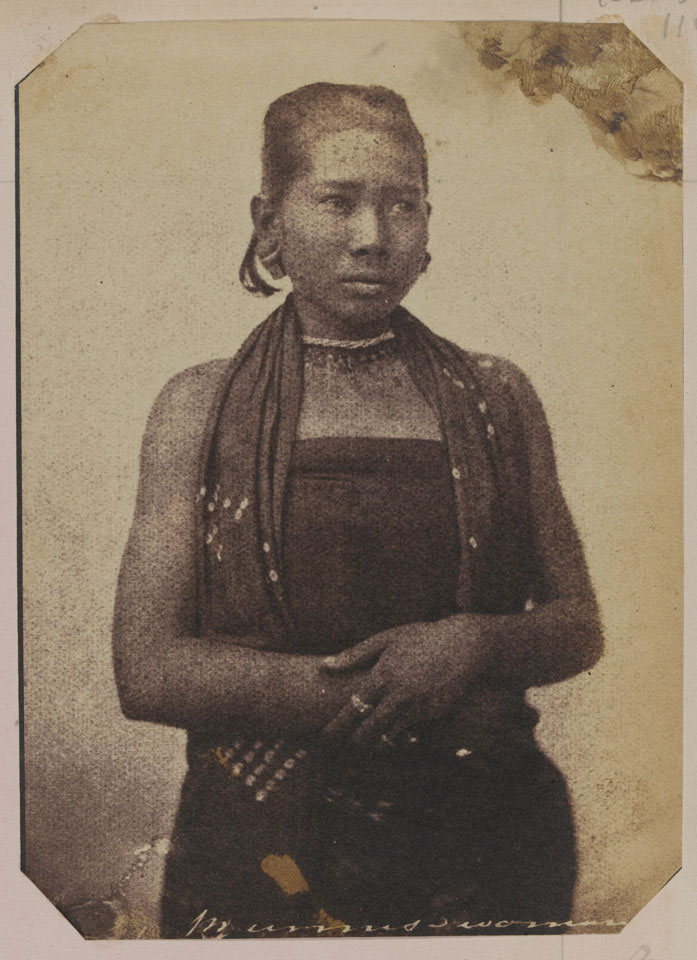
Burmese woman, by John McCosh, 1852

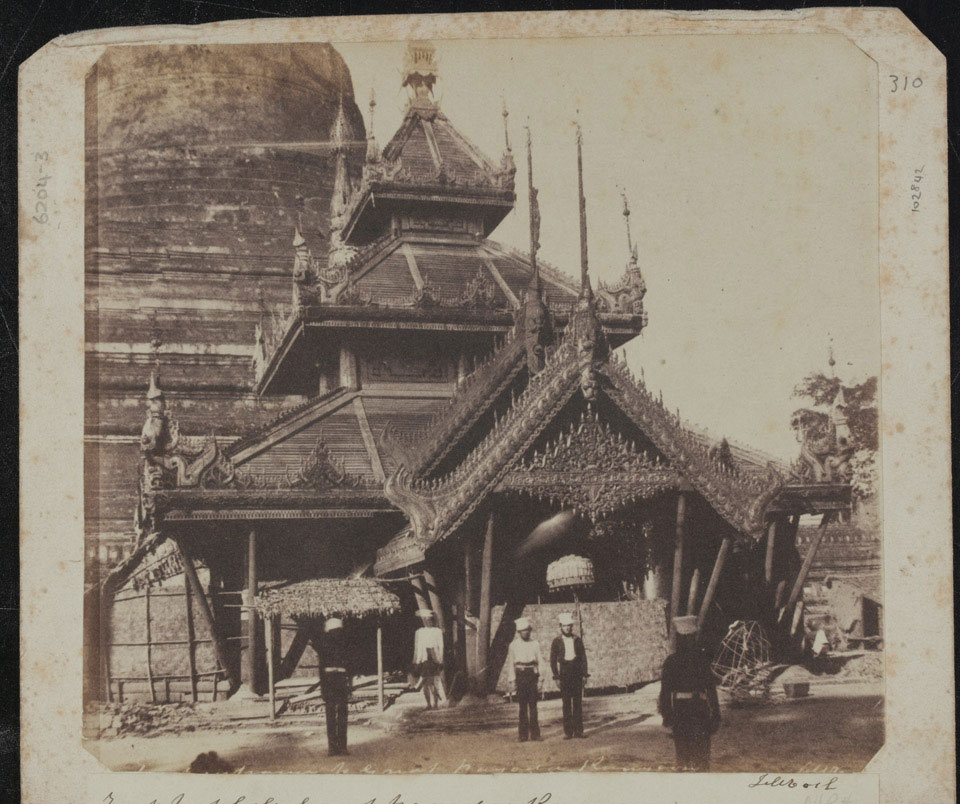
East vestibule of the Great Pagoda (Shwesandaw or Temple of the Golden Hair Relic) at Rangoon, Burma, by John McCosh, 1852

== See also ==
- History of photography
- Linnaeus Tripe
- Willoughby Wallace Hooper
- Felice Beato
- Philip Adolphe Klier
- Max Henry Ferrars
