= Calotype =

Early photographic process

Calotype or talbotype is an early photographic process introduced in 1841 by William Henry Fox Talbot, using paper coated with silver iodide. Paper texture effects in calotype photography limit the ability of this early process to record low contrast details and textures.

The term calotype comes from the Ancient Greek καλός (kalos), "beautiful", and τύπος (typos), "impression".

== The process ==
Talbot made his first successful camera photographs in 1835 using paper sensitised with silver chloride, which darkened in proportion to its exposure to light. This early "photogenic drawing" process was a printing-out process, i.e., the paper had to be exposed in the camera until the image was fully visible. A very long exposure—typically an hour or more—was required to produce an acceptable negative.

On 23 September 1840, Talbot discovered a very different developing-out process (a concept pioneered by the daguerreotype process introduced in 1839), in which only an extremely faint or completely invisible latent image had to be produced in the camera, which could be done in a minute or two if the subject was in bright sunlight. The paper, shielded from further exposure to daylight, was then removed from the camera and the latent image was chemically developed into a fully visible image. Talbot patented this major improvement in February 1841, and it was introduced to the public that year as the calotype or talbotype process.

The light-sensitive silver halide in calotype paper was silver iodide, created by the reaction of silver nitrate with potassium iodide. First, "iodised paper" was made by brushing one side of a sheet of high-quality writing paper with a solution of silver nitrate, drying it, dipping it in a solution of potassium iodide, then drying it again. At this stage, the balance of the chemicals was such that the paper was practically insensitive to light and could be stored indefinitely. When wanted for use, the side initially brushed with silver nitrate was now brushed with a "gallo-nitrate of silver" solution consisting of silver nitrate, acetic acid and gallic acid, then lightly blotted and exposed in the camera. Development was effected by brushing on more of the "gallo-nitrate of silver" solution while gently warming the paper. When development was complete, the calotype was rinsed, blotted, then either stabilized by washing it in a solution of potassium bromide, which converted the remaining silver iodide into silver bromide in a condition such that it would only slightly discolour when exposed to light, or "fixed" in a hot solution of sodium thiosulphate, then known as hyposulphite of soda and commonly called "hypo", which dissolved the silver iodide and allowed it to be entirely washed out, leaving only the silver particles of the developed image and making the calotype completely insensitive to light.

The calotype process produced a translucent original negative image from which multiple positives could be made by simple contact printing. This gave it an important advantage over the daguerreotype process, which produced an opaque original positive that could be duplicated only by copying it with a camera.

Although calotype paper could be used to make positive prints from calotype negatives, Talbot's earlier silver chloride paper, commonly called salted paper, was normally used for that purpose. It was simpler and less expensive, and Talbot himself considered the appearance of salted paper prints to be more attractive. The longer exposure required to make a salted print was at worst a minor inconvenience when making a contact print by sunlight. Calotype negatives were often impregnated with wax to improve their transparency and make the grain of the paper less conspicuous in the prints.

Talbot is sometimes erroneously credited with introducing the principle of latent image development. The bitumen process used in private experiments by Nicéphore Niépce during the 1820s involved the chemical development of a latent image, as did the widely used daguerreotype process introduced to the public by Niépce's partner and successor Louis Daguerre in 1839. Talbot was, however, the first to apply it to a paper-based process and to a negative-positive process, thereby pioneering the various developed-out negative-positive processes which have dominated non-electronic photography up to the present.

== Popularity ==
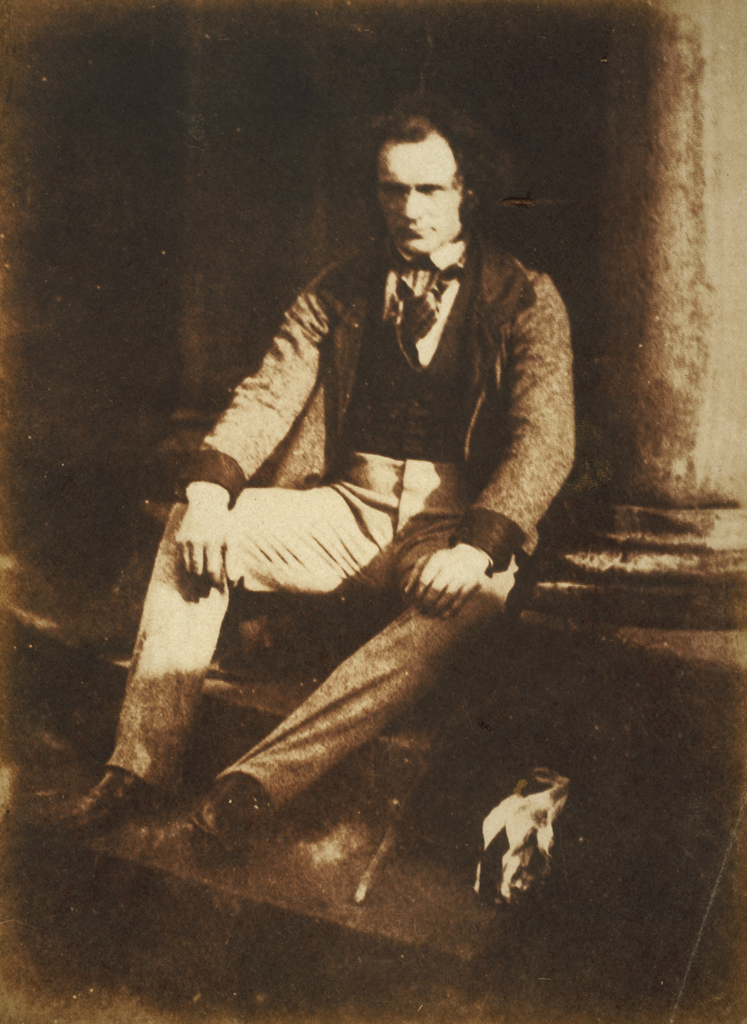
Thomas Duncan, by Hill & Adamson, c. 1844; medium: calotype print, size: 19.60 x 14.50 cm; from the collection of the National Galleries of Scotland

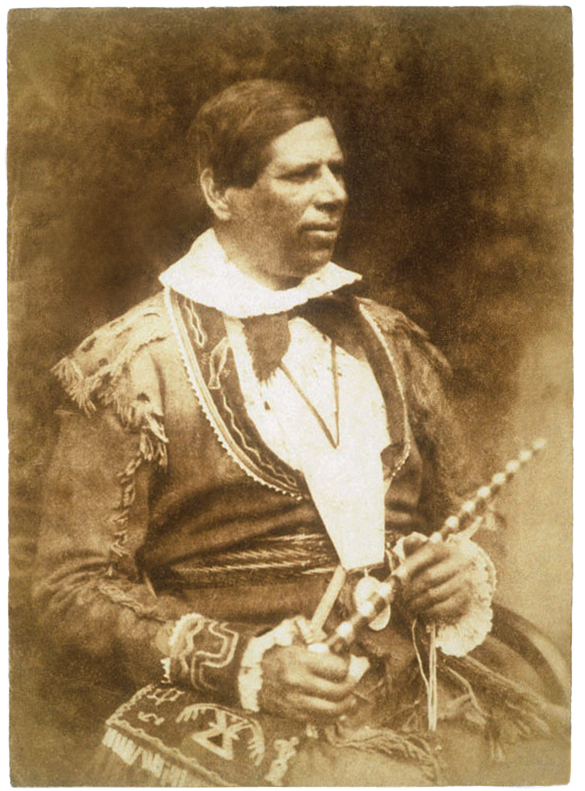
Calotype of Mississauga band Chief Kahkewaquonaby was taken August 4, 1845, in Edinburgh, Scotland, by Hill & Adamson. Images made that day are the oldest existing of a Native American. He is wearing a chiefs medal and his bag has the Ojibwa thunderbird. Getty Center

The process was in general use from 1841 to about 1860. Despite their flexibility and the ease with which they could be made, calotypes did not displace the daguerreotype.

In part, this was the result of Talbot having patented his processes in England and beyond. Unlike Talbot, Daguerre who had been granted a stipend by the French state in exchange for making his process publicly available, did not patent his invention. In Scotland, where the English patent law was not applicable at the time, members of the Edinburgh Calotype Club and other Scottish early photographers successfully adopted the paper-negative photo technology. In England, the Calotype Society was organized in London around 1847 attracting a dozen enthusiasts. In 1853, twelve years after the introduction of paper-negative photography to the public, Talbot's patent restrictions were loosened.

In addition, the calotype produced a less clear image than the daguerreotype. The use of paper as a negative meant that the texture and fibers of the paper were visible in prints made from it, leading to an image that was slightly grainy or fuzzy compared to daguerreotypes, which were usually sharp and clear. Nevertheless, calotypes—and the salted paper prints that were made from them—remained popular in the United Kingdom and on the European continent outside France in the 1850s, especially among the amateur calotypists, who prized the aesthetics of calotypes and also wanted to differentiate from commercial photographers, until the collodion process enabled both to make glass negatives combining the sharpness of a daguerreotype with the replicability of a calotype later in the nineteenth century. British photographers also brought the calotype to India, where, for example, in 1848, John McCosh, a surgeon in the East India Company, took the first image of the Maharajah Duleep Singh.

== See also ==
- Albumen print
- Ambrotype
- Collodion process
- Daguerreotype
- Tintype
