= Positive and negative (disambiguation) =

Positive and negative are signs used in mathematics.

Positive and negative or negative and positive may also refer to:

== Hard sciences ==
=== Mathematics ===
- Positive and negative signs, symbols
- Positive and negative parts, characteristics of a function
- Positive and negative sets, in measure theory
- Positive and negative zero, signed zero

=== Statistics and medicine ===
- Positive and negative predictive values, statistical measures
- False positives and false negatives, types of errors in binary classification
- Positive or negative test, possible result of a medical test

== Humanities ==
- Negative and positive rights, concept of obligations
- Negative and positive atheism, forms of atheism
- Positive and negative feedback, qualitative types
- Positive and Negative Affect Schedule, a form of questionnaire measuring psychological effects
- Positive or negative externalities, economic activities
- Positive and negative politeness, types of politeness strategies in politeness theory
- Positive and negative value, ethic or philosophical values
- Positive-negative film, prints
- Positvity/negativity ratio, discredited concept in positive psychology
- Positive and negative sign (astrology), types of energetic polarity

== See also ==
- Positive (disambiguation)
- Negative (disambiguation)
- Pros and Cons (disambiguation)
