= Affirmation =

Affirmation/Affirmations" or Affirm/Affirming" may refer to:

== Logic ==
- Affirmation, a declaration that something is true
- In logic, the union of the subject and predicate of a proposition

== Law ==
- Affirmation (law), a declaration made by and allowed to those who conscientiously object to taking an oath
- Affirmed in law, means that a decision has been reviewed and found valid

== Business ==
- Affirm Holdings, a financial technology company

== Psychology ==
- Self-affirmation, the psychological process of re-affirming personal values to protect self-identity
- Affirmations (New Age), the practice of positive thinking in New Age terminology
- Affirmative prayer, a form of prayer that focuses on a positive outcome
- Nietzschean affirmation, a philosophical concept according to which we create meaning and knowledge for ourselves in a nihilistic world

== Organisations ==
- Affirmation: LGBTQ Mormons, Families, & Friends, an international Latter-day Saint organisation
- Affirmations (Ferndale, Michigan), an LGBT community center in Ferndale, Michigan

== Music ==
- Affirmation (Beverley Knight album), and song by Knight on this album
- Affirmation (Savage Garden album)
- "Affirmation" (George Benson song), a song written by José Féliciano, which became a jazz standard associated with George Benson
- "Affirmation" (Savage Garden song)

== Other uses ==
- Affirmation and negation in grammar
- Affirmation of St. Louis, the founding document of the Continuing Anglican Movement churches
- Affirmations (film), a 1990 short film
- The Affirmation, a 1981 novel by Christopher Priest
- Affirmations (L. Ron Hubbard), a work written by L. Ron Hubbard

== See also ==
- Affirmative (disambiguation)
- Negation (disambiguation)
