= Swim Kids =

Australian swimming education initiative

Swim Kids is an Australian initiative by Uncle Tobys together with Royal Life Saving Society Australia. The goal is to reach the long term objective of helping thousands of Australian kids learn how to swim and survive.

The website features swimming videos from Grant Hackett and Eamon Sullivan, and tips from Emily Seebohm and Cate Campbell.

== See also ==
- Swimming lessons
