= Uncle Tobys =

Australian food manufacturing company

- Product type: Breakfast cereal
- Current owner: Nestlé
- Country: Australia
- Introduced: 1892
- Markets: Australia
- Previous owners: Goodman Fielder
- Website: uncletobys.com.au

Uncle Tobys is an Australian food manufacturing company which specialises in breakfast oat products. Since its foundation in 1861, the company has expanded its product range across the cereal and ready-to-eat snack market. Uncle Tobys is a subsidiary of Nestlé, after being acquired in 2006. Uncle Tobys’ main factory is situated in the town of Wahgunyah, Victoria.

== History ==
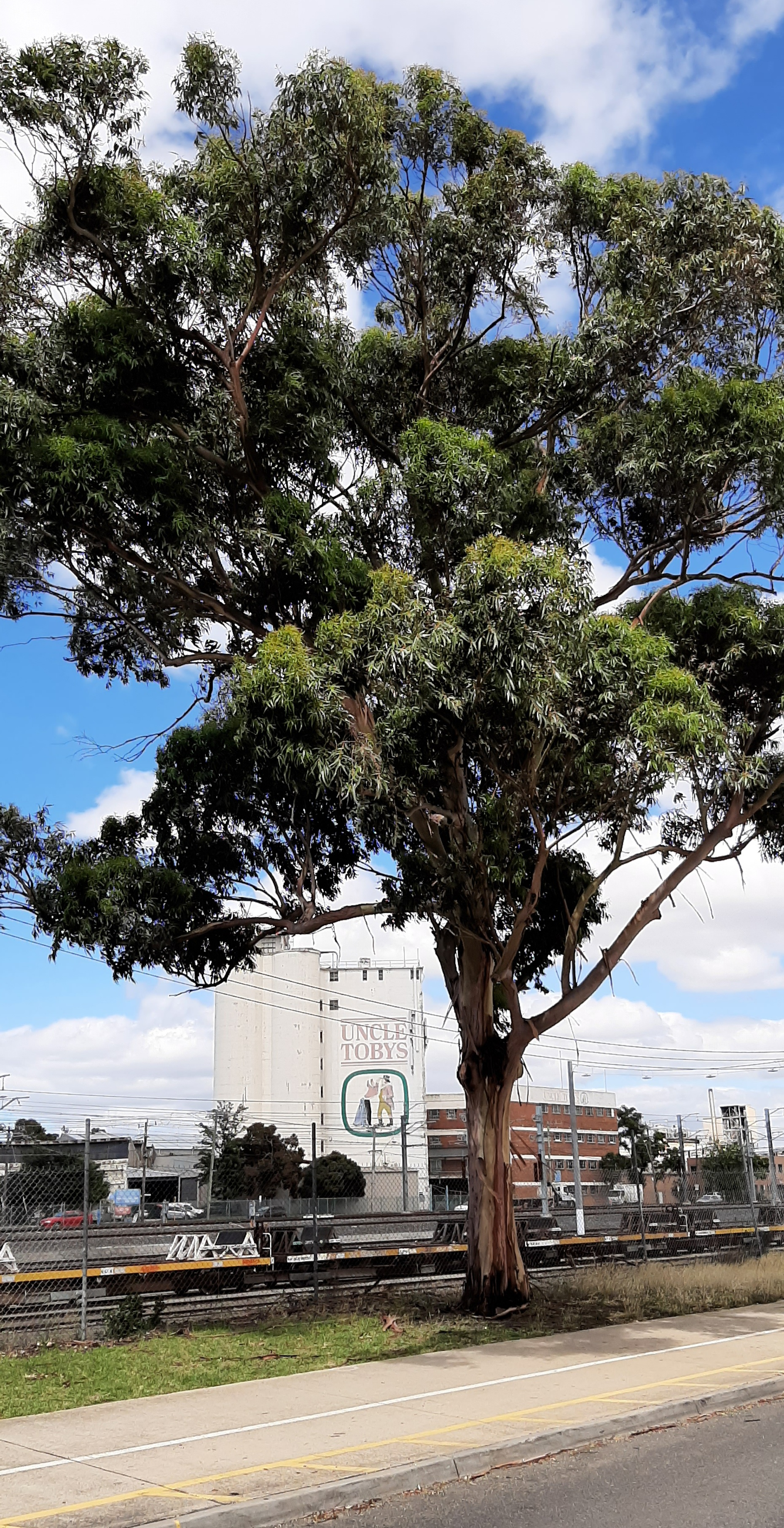
The Uncle Tobys silo on Sunshine Rd, West Footscray, Victoria

During the gold rush in Victoria, brothers Leonard and George Parsons left England for Melbourne and began manufacturing under the name John Bull Oats, and in 1861 established the Parsons Bros. company. Parsons Bros. oats were marketed by Clifford Love & Co, which created the Uncle Tobys brand and logo for a new line of oats in 1893.

In 1982, Clifford Love & Co. was merged with the consumer product division of a rival company, ICM Australia, to form Best Foods. ICM began expanding the Uncle Tobys brand to products beyond oats and muesli, and in 1989 renamed Best Foods to Uncle Tobys due to the much higher consumer recognition.

On 23 May 2006, Nestlé announced its acquisition of Uncle Tobys Australia—in addition to the brand rights in New Zealand—for the total sum of $890 million Australian dollars. The Uncle Tobys cereal business—which accounted for approximately 40% of its overall sales—was bought by Cereal Partners Worldwide (a joint venture between General Mills and Nestlé). Other sections of the Uncle Tobys business, such as nutritious snacks and instant soups, were directly incorporated into Nestlé Australia.

== Products ==
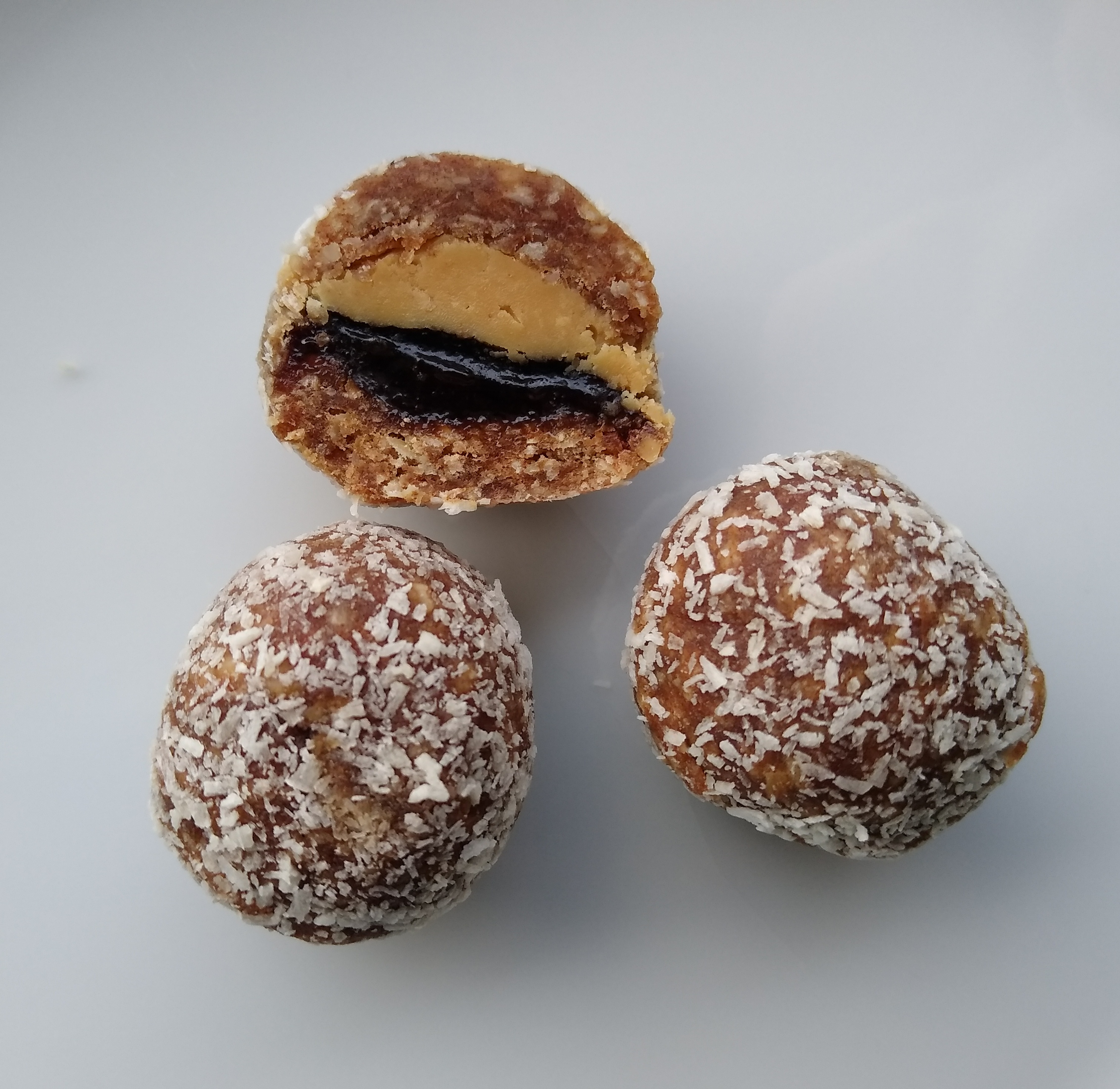
Uncle Tobys oat balls

The Uncle Tobys product suite includes oats, cereals (including Cheerios under the Uncle Tobys brand, PLUS, Fruity Bites), snacks (Chewy bars, gummy fruit rolls as "Roll-Ups", and Crackers), and "goodness shakes".

== Oats and nutrition ==
80% of the oats used by Uncle Tobys Australia are of the Mikita variety. Mikita oats differ from conventional oats due to higher levels of disease resistance, increased yield potential, and increased levels of β-glucan. Mikita oats were developed at the South Australian Research Development Institute (SARDI), by the National Oat Breeding Program. The research was funded by the Uncle Tobys Corporation, in partnership with various governmental and corporate entities.

Uncle Tobys sources 50% of its oats from local farms, which are within 100 km its main factory. In its corporate supply chain, Uncle Tobys exclusively utilises suppliers who have been certified as “Level A” by the National Association of Sustainable Agriculture.

Uncle Tobys often advertises the health benefits of its oats, calling them a ‘natural superfood’. Monro et al. (2003) conducted research on three of Uncle Tobys oat bars (Break-Free Fruesli, Whole meal Fruit, and Chewy Muesli). The study found that: "Dietary Fibre contents are consistent with recommendations for adult males made by the Standing Committee on the Evaluation of Dietary Reference Intakes of the Food and Nutrition Board".

== Advertising malpractice ==
On 13 September 2006, the Australian Competition & Consumer Commission (ACCC) mandated that Uncle Tobys stop advertising that its Fruit Roll-Ups are ‘Made with 65% real fruit’. The chairman of the commission released a statement saying: "The ACCC was concerned that the Roll-Ups composition was being misrepresented to consumers". After the announcement, Uncle Tobys altered its advertising practices to remove the aforementioned phrase. Uncle Tobys was prevented from suggesting that Roll-Ups are equivalent to any percentage of fresh fruit and was prevented from running an advertisement that showed an apple being compacted into a Fruit Roll-Up.

After the mandate, the ACCC required Uncle Tobys to publish an article for the food industry, emphasising the importance of advertising standards. In the article, Uncle Tobys stated that its "key learning from this experience was that in making representations to consumers, we have to carefully consider how consumers might view both representations on packaging and the overall impression created by all the aspects of product marketing, including labels, branding and advertising."

On 26 November 2015, Uncle Tobys was fined $32,400 for false claims about the protein content in oats, after being warned three times by the ACCC in infringement notices. The commission issued infringement notices because it had reason to believe that Cereal Partners Australia had violated Australian Consumer Law by misrepresenting the protein content within Uncle Tobys oat products. The commission alleged that the packaging “made false or misleading representations that the oats in these Uncle Tobys products contained a significant amount of protein, which is not the case”. Uncle Tobys had included a disclaimer with the packaging, but this did not impact the verdict.

== Swim My Way initiative ==
Historically, the Uncle Tobys brand has been closely associated with swimming. In 1983, the company sponsored its first athlete—Lisa Curry—a swimmer at the Commonwealth Games. Currently, Uncle Tobys has two brand ambassadors: Olympic Champions Cate and Bronte Campbell.

Uncle Tobys, in collaboration with Royal Life Saving Australia, previously launched a swimming campaign. The program is named ‘Swim My Way’ and was launched on the 6 March 2018. The aim of this program is to promote swimming to all Australians, regardless of their age demographic.

See also: Swim Kids, another initiative by Uncle Tobys, with the purpose of helping kids learn how to swim.

== Product recall ==
On 10 January 2020, Food Standards Australia New Zealand issued a product recall for a number of Uncle Tobys products. The recall affected four flavours of fruit roll-ups; including passionfruit, rainbow berry, rainbow fruit salad, and fun-prints strawberry (Food Standards Australia New Zealand, 2020).

The product recall was due to equipment failure within one of Nestlé's production facilities, which created the possibility for there to be foreign matter (small metal fragments) in the product. Customers who purchased the recalled batches were entitled to a full refund.

== See also ==
- List of oldest companies in Australia
