= Positivity =

Positivity may refer to:

- The degree to which something is positive
- Positive charge, a type of electric charge
- Positivity/negativity ratio
- Positivity effect
- Positivity offset

== Music ==
- Positivity (album), an album by Incognito
- "Positivity", a song by Prince on his Lovesexy album
- "Positivity", a song by Stevie Wonder and his daughter Aisha Morris on his A Time to Love album
- "Positivity", a song by Ashley Tisdale on Headstrong (Ashley Tisdale album)
- "Positivity" (Suede song), a song by Suede
- "Positivity", a song by Black Eyed Peas from Behind the Front

== See also ==
- Positivism
- Positivism (disambiguation)
- Toxic positivity
