= Negativity =

Negativity may refer to:

- Negativity (quantum mechanics), a measure of quantum entanglement in quantum mechanics
- Negative charge of electricity
- Electronegativity, a chemical property pertaining to the ability to attract electrons
- Positivity/negativity ratio, in behavioral feedback.
- Negativity effect, a psychological bias
- Negativity (album)

== See also ==
- Negative (disambiguation)
- Negativism (disambiguation)
