= Increment =

Increment or incremental may refer to:

- Incrementalism, a theory (also used in politics as a synonym for gradualism)
- Increment and decrement operators, the operators ++ and -- in computer programming
- Incremental computing
- Incremental backup, which contain only that portion that has changed since the preceding backup copy.
- Increment, chess term for additional time a chess player receives on each move
- Incremental games
- Increment in rounding

== See also ==
- 1+1 (disambiguation)
- ++ (disambiguation)
