= Positive action (disambiguation) =

Positive action is the promotion of an under-represented group without prejudicing the criteria of selection by merit.

Positive action may also refer to:

- Positive Action, a series of political protests and strikes in pre-independence Ghana
- Positive Action Group, a political pressure group based in the Isle of Man
- Affirmative action or positive action, policies that take race, color, religion, sex or national origin into consideration

== See also ==
- Positive (disambiguation)
- Positive affectivity, the psychological capability to respond positively
- Positive liberty, having the power and resources to act to fulfill one's own potential
