= The Surprises of the Superhuman =

Poem by Wallace Stevens

"The Surprises of the Superhuman" is a poem from Wallace Stevens's first book of poetry, Harmonium. It was first published in 1918, so it is in the public domain.

The Surprises of the Superhuman

The palais de justice of chambermaids
Tops the horizon with its colonnades.

If it were lost in Űbermenschlichkeit,
Perhaps our wretched state would soon come right.

For somehow the brave dicta of kings
Make more awry our faulty human things.

This poem was Section V of the poem-sequence "Lettres d'un Soldat" (1918). It was extracted as "The Surprises of the Superhuman" for the second edition of Harmonium, along with "Negation"; the two poems adjoin each other near the end of the book. Both poems reflect Stevens's reading of Nietzsche. Bates comments that it contrasts the bourgeois concept of justice with that suitable to "Űbermenschlichkeit".
