= Positif =

Positif may refer to:

- Positif (album), 1984 album by Jean-Jacques Goldman
- "Positif" (song), 2012 song by Matt Houston and P-Square
- Positif (magazine), French film magazine, founded in 1952
- Positif, known name for the Positive organ

== See also ==
- Positive (disambiguation)
