= Affirmative =

Affirmative may refer to:

- Pertaining to truth
- An answer that shows agreement or acceptance, such as "yes"
- Affirmative (linguistics), a positive (non-negated) sentence or clause
- Affirmative (policy debate), the team which affirms the resolution
- Affirmative action

== See also ==
- Affirmation (disambiguation)
