= Negation (disambiguation) =

Negation is a connective in logic and an operation computing that maps true to false and false to true.

Negation may also refer to:

- Negation (linguistics), a grammatical operation by which a proposition is replaced by one that states the opposite, as by the addition of not
- Negation (comics), a CrossGen comic
- The Negation, a 2004 album by the Polish metal band Decapitated
- Negation (poem), a 1918 poem by Wallace Stevens
- Negation (algebra), negation proper in various algebraic structures
- Negation (arithmetic), the act of forming the additive inverse of a number in arithmetic

== See also ==
- Negative (disambiguation)
