= Negation (poem) =

Poem by Wallace Stevens

"Negation" is a poem from Wallace Stevens's first book of poetry, Harmonium. It was first published in 1918, so it is in the public domain.

Negation

Hi! The creator too is blind,
Struggling toward his harmonious whole,
Rejecting intermediate parts,
Horrors and falsities and wrongs;
Incapable master of all force,
Too vague idealist, overwhelmed
By an afflatus that persists.
For this, then, we endure brief lives,
The evanescent symmetries
From that meticulous potter's thumb.

This poem was Section VII of the poem—sequence "Lettres d'un Soldat" (1918). It was extracted as "Negation" for inclusion in the second edition of Harmonium. It may reflect Stevens's reading of Thus Spoke Zarathustra, according to Bates. The poem's image of God as bungling potter recalls Zarathustra's dialogue with the last pope, in which God is similarly characterized.

Another Harmonium poem that clearly reflects Stevens's reading of Nietzsche is "The Surprises of the Superhuman", which was also extracted from "Lettres d'un Soldat" for inclusion in the second edition.

The poem is notable for its arch wit and the anti-poetical salutation, "Hi!", rather than as a solution to the problem of evil.
