= Negative test =

A negative test can relate to:

- Negative diagnostic test, a medical test in which the target parameter that was evaluated was not present
- Negative test variation, a software stress test designed to determine the response of the system outside of normal parameters
- Negative testing
