= Minus (disambiguation) =

Minus refers to the minus sign, a mathematical symbol.

Minus may also refer to:

- Minus (record label) (also "m_nus"), a Canadian record label
- minus (webcomic), a webcomic
- Mínus, an Icelandic band
- Minus.Driver, a nu metal band formerly known as Minus
- Minus (album), a 2008 album by Dukes of Windsor
- "Minus", a 1996 song by Beck from Odelay
- "Minus", a 2002 song by In Flames from Reroute to Remain
- Ray Minus (born 1964), a Bahamian boxer of the 1980s, 1990s, and 2000s

== See also ==
- The minus sign represents the subtraction mathematical operation.
