= Double Negative (band) =

American punk band

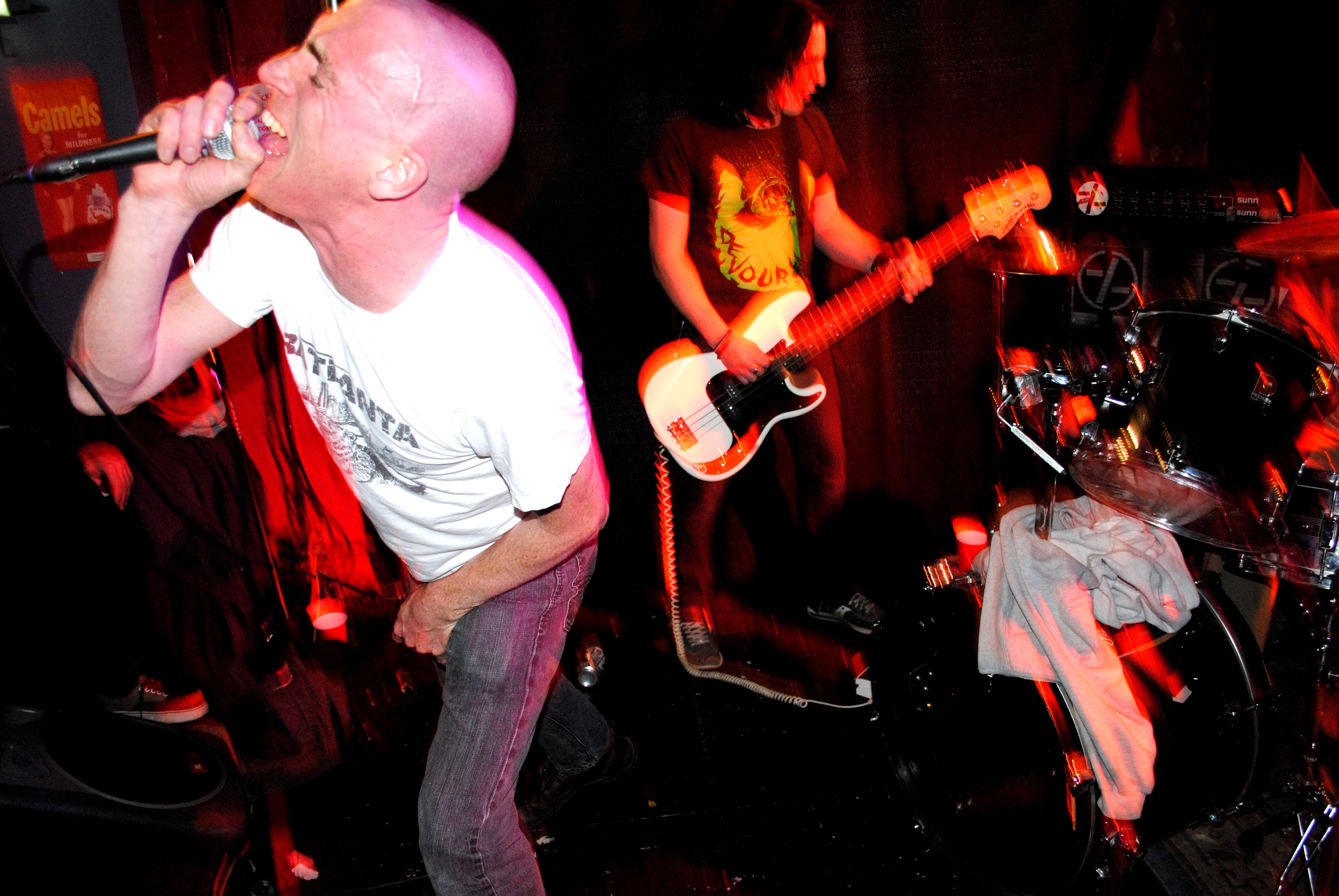
- Live at Slim's on February 28, 2010

Background information
- Origin: Raleigh, North Carolina, U.S.
- Genres: Hardcore punk, punk rock
- Years active: 2006–2013
- Label: Sorry State Records
- Past members: Scott Williams; Booby Michaud; Cameron Craig; Justin Gray; Connor Donegan; Kevin Collins; Brian Walsby

Double Negative was an American hardcore punk band from Raleigh, North Carolina.

Guitarist Scott Williams (a.k.a.: Epic Warfare) previously played in American Lore (with Mike Dean from Corrosion of Conformity), Fight 4 Life, Second Coming, Days Of..., Dixie Automotive, Garbageman, Daddy and Volcanoes. Original drummer Brian Walsby had been in California's Scared Straight, Willard, Shiny Beast and Patty Duke Syndrome (with Ryan Adams), as well as Wwax, Daddy, Siberian, Snake Nation (with Mike Dean and Woody Weatherman of Corrosion of Conformity) and even the final Polvo lineup that recorded Shapes before they disbanded. Original singer Kevin Collins (a.k.a.: KC) was in Subculture, Days Of and Erectus Monotone. Bassist Justin Gray was in Dixie Automotive, Big Dan, Willard, Garbageman, The Rails, and The Step Gods.

In 2011, both Walsby and Collins left the band for personal reasons. Charlotte, North Carolina native Bobby Michaud was asked to play drums and Cameron Craig took over vocal duties.

Their debut album, The Wonderful and Frightening World of... came out on No Way Records in 2007. The three-song Raw Energy EP was released in 2008. A burglarized practice space in December 2009 delayed their next release when a 16-track portable Korg was stolen containing the almost-complete LP. The band was finally able to deliver their sophomore release, Daydreamnation, on July 27, 2010.

They played the Hidden World Festival in Toronto, Canada in October 2007, and had an eight-page feature interview in the August 2008 edition of Maximumrocknroll (issue No. 303). In September 2010, they toured Europe for a handful of dates, supporting Daydreamnation.

In 2012, the band played Austin, Texas's Chaos in Tejas Festival, completed a full US summer tour, opened for Off! and Negative Approach on a two-week stretch of dates, and are slotted to continued as support for Off! and The Spits late that year.

The band split up in 2013.

== Members ==
- Cameron Craig – vocals (2011–2013)
- Justin Gray – bass (2006–2013)
- Scott Williams – guitar (2006–2013)
- Connor Donegan – drums (2013)
- Kevin Collins – vocals (2006–2011)
- Bobby Michaud – drums (2011–2012)
- Brian Walsby – drums (2006–2011)

== Discography ==
- The Wonderful and Frightening World of... LP (No Way Records) (2007)
- "AH!DICTION" Track on No Bullshit Vol.3 Compilation EP (No Way Records) (2007)
- Raw Energy (three-song) EP (Sorry State Records) (2008)
- Daydreamnation LP (Sorry State Records) (2010)
- Hardcore Confusion Volume I (Sorry State Records) (2011)
- Hardcore Confusion Volume II (Sorry State Records) (2011)
- Hits 7" (Sorry State Records) (2012)
- Hardcore Confusion Volumes III & IV (Sorry State Records) (2012)
