= Plus (cereal) =

Breakfast cereal

Plus is a breakfast cereal range by Australian breakfast company Uncle Tobys, now a subsidiary of Nestlé.

The range was introduced in 2001 as Flakes Plus. The original flavours were Fibre Plus, Muesli Flakes, Sports Plus, Sultanas 'n' Bran, and Lite Start. In 2002, the range was renamed simply Plus. In 2004, a new flavour, Crisp 'n' Crunchy, was introduced. In 2005, Fibre Plus and Sports Plus were renamed Fibre Mix and Sports Lift respectively. In 2006, Protein Mix was introduced, followed by Antioxidant Lift and Omega 3 Lift in 2007 and 2009 respectively.

In 2000, the face of Australian swimmer Ian Thorpe appeared on boxes of Sports Plus cereal.
