= Plus-size =

Plus-size or plus-sized may refer to:

- Obesity, sometimes euphemistically referred to as being "plus-sized"
- Plus-size clothing, a general term given to clothing proportioned specifically for people around size 18 and up in the U.S.
- Plus-size model, a fashion model who specializes in modeling the above-mentioned clothing
- Plus sizing, the practice of changing a vehicle's wheels to a larger size and reducing the size of the tires to compensate
