= TV Plus (Netherlands) =

- Country: Netherlands
- Broadcast area: Netherlands
- Headquarters: Hilversum

Programming
- Language: Dutch

Ownership
- Owner: NOS, NOB, PTT, Philips

History
- Launched: February 1992; 34 years ago
- Closed: December 31, 1996; 29 years ago

TV Plus was a Dutch satellite channel funded by Philips. Broadcasts began in February 1992 and ended in 1997. It was, most notably, the first European television channel to broadcast in widescreen.

== History ==
TV Plus started broadcasting in February 1992. It was a joint-venture between NOS, NOB, PTT and Philips, the latter of which funded the service. It was available on a Eutelsat satellite as well as on cable television as a subscription channel. Satellite signals were distributed using the D2-MAC system and were encrypted. Each partner was involved in a different aspect of the channel: NOS provided programming, NOB shared additional resources, PTT offered the satellite transponder and Philips Netherlands supplied equipment worth 50 million florins. Consequently, NOB produced programmes for TV Plus using the European HDTV system. It broadcast for four hours a day at first and it managed to share a transponder with Polsat (back then licenced to Hilversum).

In 1993, coinciding with the European Union's PALplus programme, it received a financial boost worth additional millions of florins from Brussels. By this time, the three terrestrial channels in the Netherlands, all of which part of the public system, were already airing programmes in such format. In 1994, NOS and NOB produced widescreen Eredivisie highlights as a sublicensee; these rights were later transferred to Sport7, which only broadcast in 4:3. That year it also funded VPRO's Mixomatosis, which aired on Nederland 3.

The channel carried the 1996 Summer Olympics. Just before the event, it was announced that the channel would close on 31 December. It was stipulated that TV Plus was going to be a five-year experimental project and there would be no expansion beyond that timeframe.

It wasn't until 2005 that widescreen broadcasting on Dutch television became more widespread.
