= Negative result =

Negative result may refer to:

- Proof of impossibility, a proof that a particular problem cannot be solved
- Null result, a result which shows no evidence of the intended effect
- Null hypothesis, a hypothesis that there is no relationship between two measured phenomena
