= Positivism (disambiguation) =

Positivism is a philosophy which states that the only authentic knowledge is scientific knowledge. Positivism was central to the foundation of academic sociology.

Positivism may also refer to:

- Logical positivism, a school of philosophy that combines empiricism with a version of rationalism
- Sociological positivism, a sociological paradigm
- Legal positivism, a school of thought in jurisprudence and the philosophy of law
- Positivist school (criminology), attempts to find scientific objectivity for the measurement and quantification of criminal behavior
- Positivism in Poland, a socio-cultural movement in Poland after the 1863 January Uprising

== See also ==
- Postpositivism, a metatheoretical stance that critiques and amends positivism
- Postpositivism (international relations), a school of thought in international relations theory
- Optimism, a positive mental attitude
