= ++ =

++ may refer to:

- Checkmate, in chess notation
- The increment operator, in some programming languages
- + + (EP), by South Korean girl group Loona

== See also ==
- PLUSPLUS, a Ukrainian TV channel
- Plus+, a gaming platform
