= Positive-negative film =

Positive-negative film is instant photographic film that generates both a positive print and a negative from a single exposure on a single medium.

Polaroid Type 55, Polaroid Type 665, and Polaroid Type 105 are notable films of this variety.
