= Collotype =

Photographic printing process

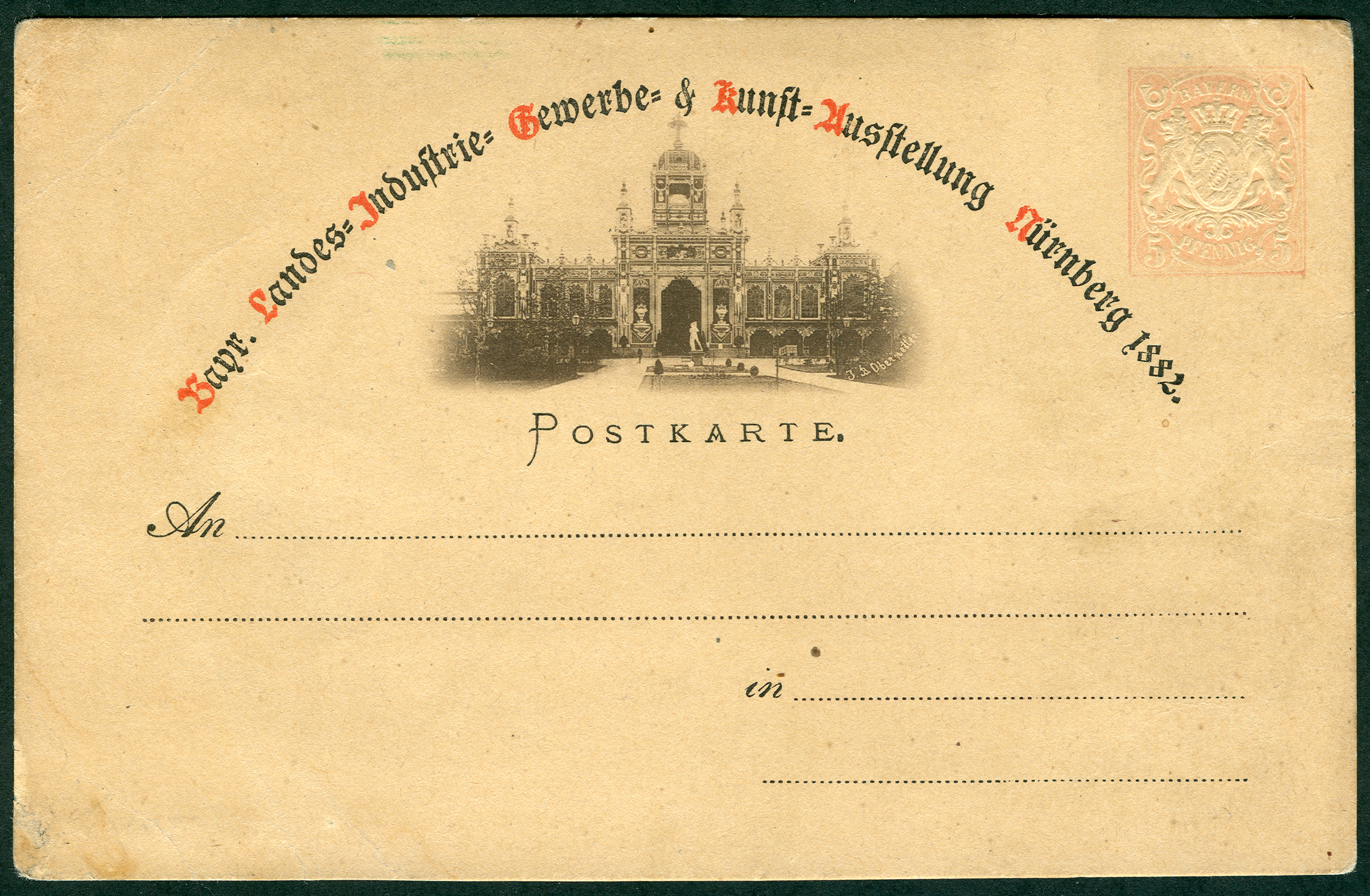
Early collotype postcard; 1882 in Nuremberg, signed by J. B. Obernetter

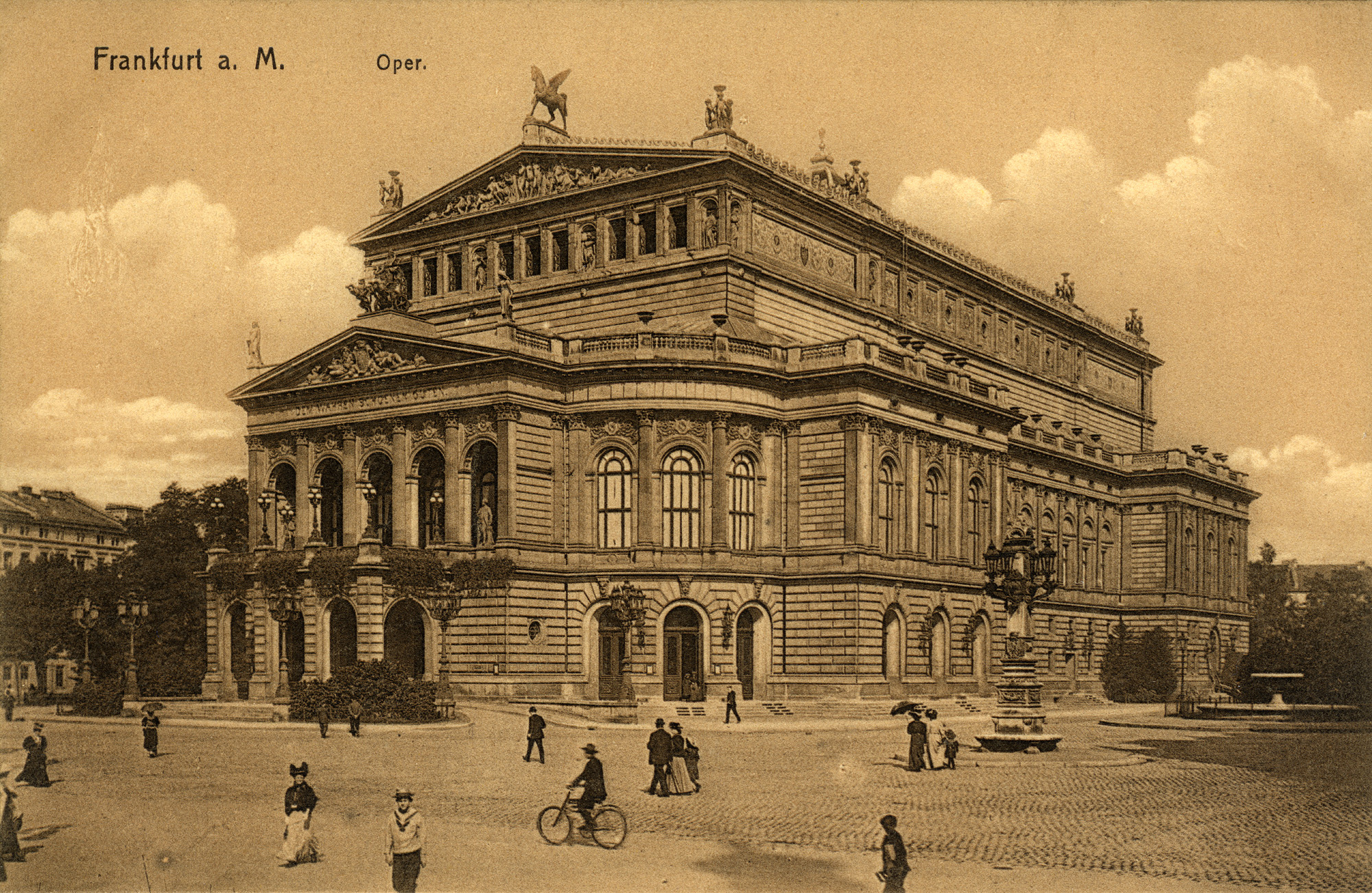
Postcard of the "Alte Oper" in Frankfurt, about 1900.

Collotype is a gelatin-based photographic printing process invented by Alphonse Poitevin in 1855 to print images in a wide variety of tones without the need for halftone screens. The majority of collotypes were produced between the 1870s and 1920s. It was the first form of photolithography.

== Invention ==
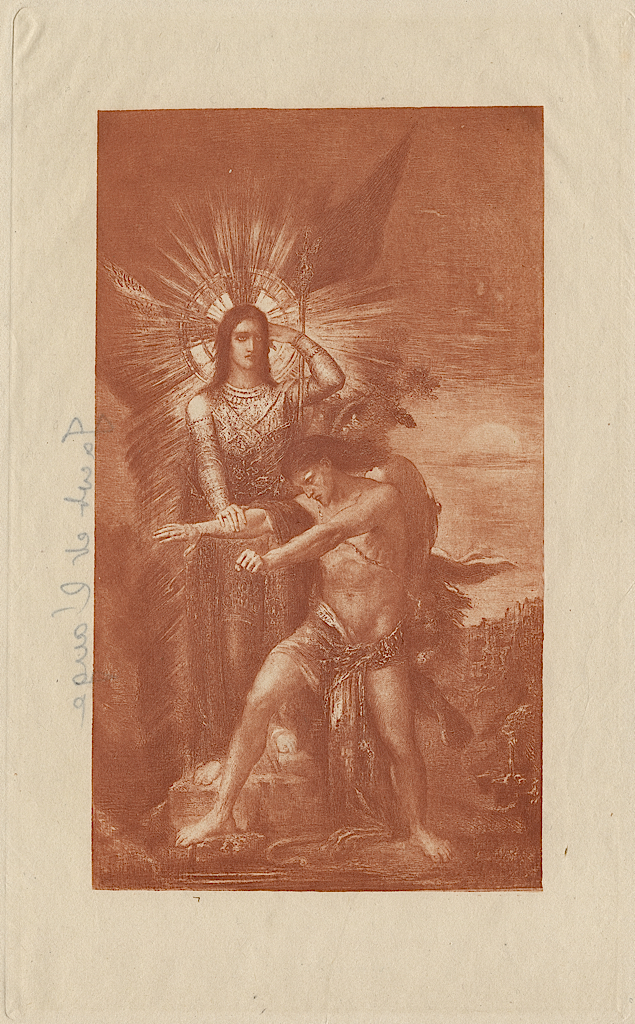
Charles Albert Waltner after Gustave Moreau, Jacob and the Angel, after 1898, collotype on Japanese paper

Collotype originates from the Greek word kolla for (flour paste) glue. Poitevin patented collotype printing the same year it was invented in 1855. The process was shown in 1859 by Ferdinand Joubert (1810–1884).

== Process ==
=== Poitevin's collotype ===
In Poitevin's process, a lithographic stone was coated with a light-sensitive gelatin solution and exposed through a photographic negative. The gelatin would harden in exposed areas, leading to the stone becoming hydrophobic in light areas (and thus receptive to the greasy ink) and hydrophilic under dark areas (ink-repelling). The stone was then printed via the standard lithographic process, producing a monochrome print.

=== 1860s developments ===
In 1865, Tessie du Motay and C. R. Marechal applied the gelatin to a copper plate, which was easier to handle than a lithographic stone. However, the gelatin did not adhere well and limited print runs to about 100.

In 1868, Joseph Albert and Jakub Husník applied a gelatin-albumen mixture to glass, which was then coated with light-sensitized gelatin. This allowed print runs of up to 1,000. This patent was later purchased by Edward Bierstadt, who developed one of the first commercial collotype companies in New York City.

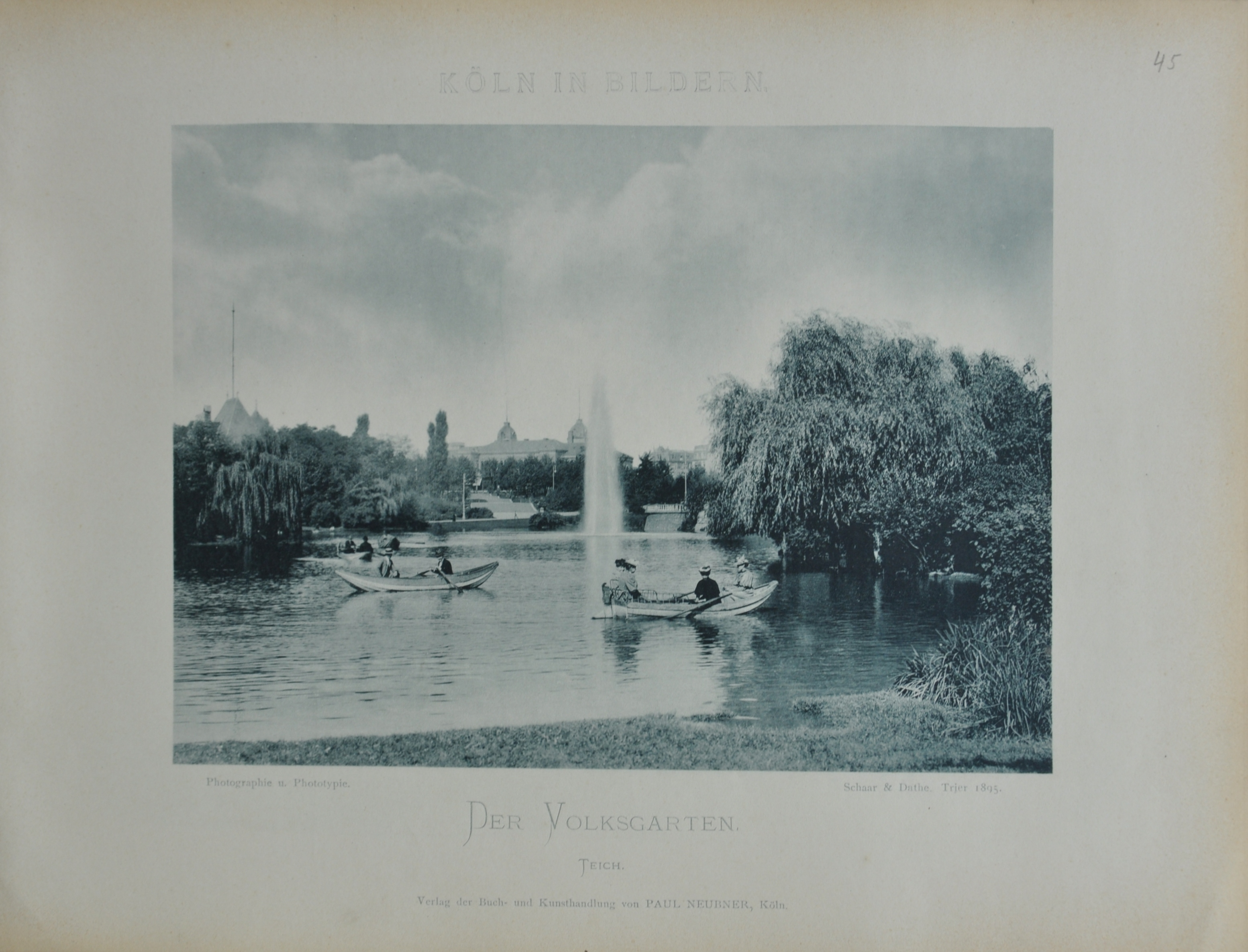
Example of a collotype ("Phototypie" in the caption) printed in blue ink. This is a monochrome collotype, not a color collotype.

=== Later collotype ===
The collotype plate is made by coating a plate of glass or metal with a substrate composed of gelatin or other colloid and hardening it. Then it is coated with a thick coat of dichromated gelatin and dried carefully at a controlled temperature (a little over 50° Celsius) so it "reticulates" or breaks up into a finely grained pattern when washed later in approximately 16 °C water. The plate is then exposed in contact with the negative using an ultraviolet (UV) source which changes the ability of the exposed gelatin to absorb water later. The plate is developed by carefully washing out the dichromate salt and dried without heat. The plate is left in a cool dry place to cure for 24 hours before using it to print.

Related processes, or processes developed from collotype, or even alternate names for collotype include albertype, Alethetype, autocopyist, artotype, Gelatinotypy, heliotype, hydrotype, indotint, ink-photo, leimtype, lichtdruck, papyrotype, photogelatin, photophane, phototype, Roto-Collotype, Rye's, and Sinop.

=== Color collotype or chromocollotype ===
In 1874, Joseph Albert produced the first color collotypes with three collotype plates, each inked in a different color. In 1882, the Hoeschtype, which used six plates, was patented.

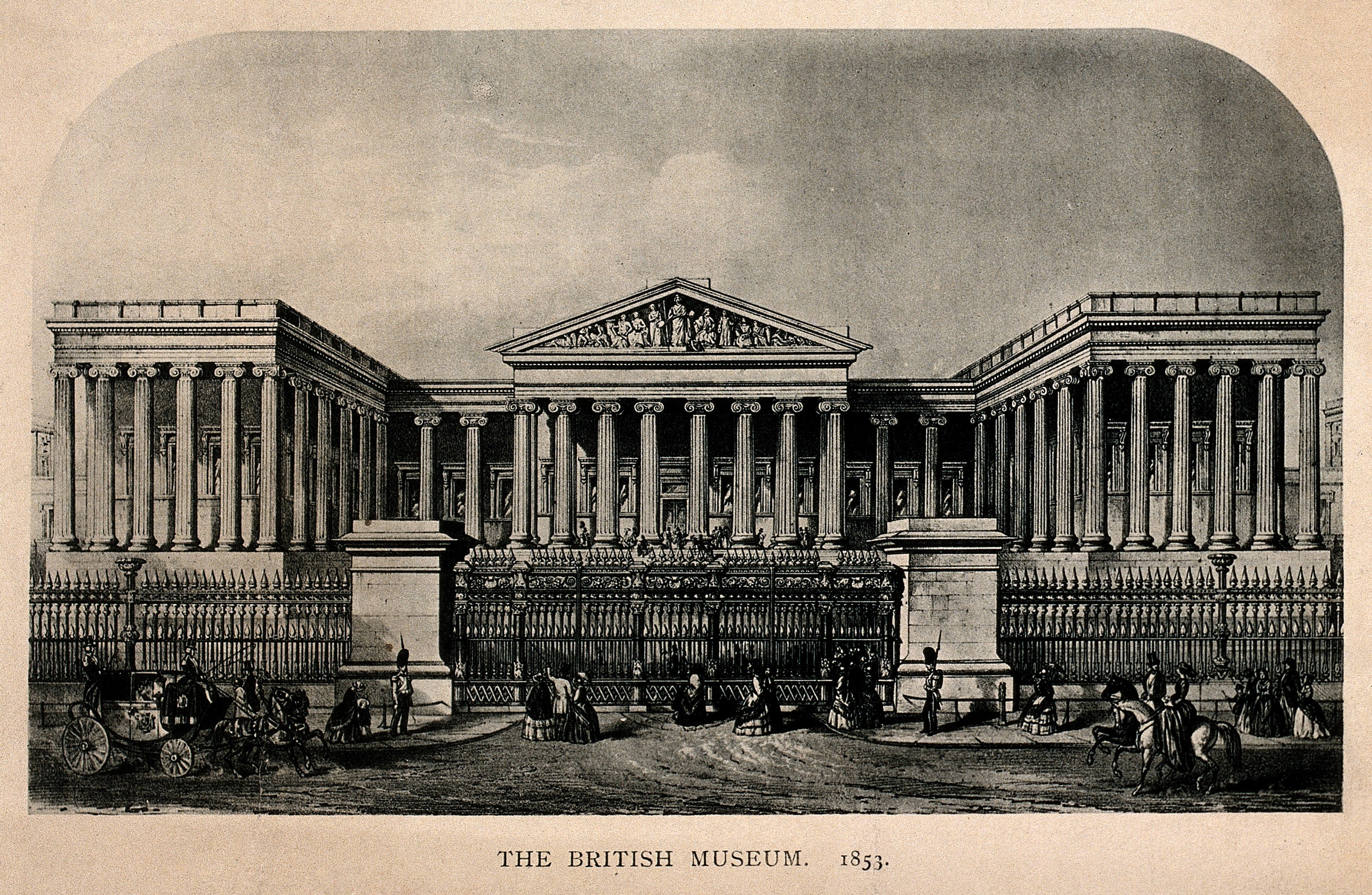
Reproductive collotype of a wood engraving of the British Museum.

=== Combination processes ===
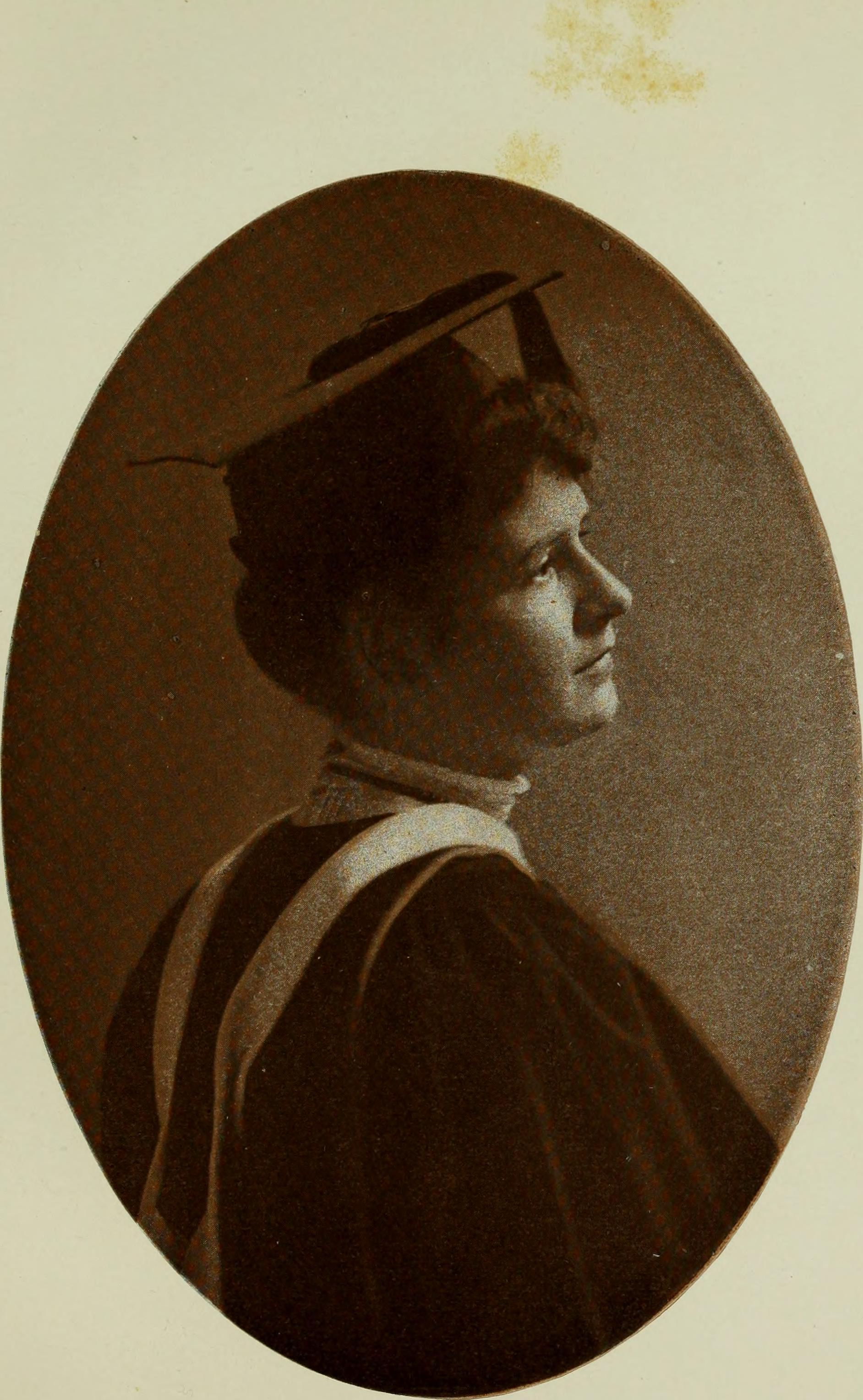
Halftone collotype process with mezzograph, 1913.

==== Mezzograph collotype ====
Mezzograph was a trade name used by Valentine Co. Ltd. of Scotland, for their multicolored postcards, printed in a hybrid process where colors were printed via photolithography and then overprinted in black or blue collotype for the "outlines" of the image.

==== Halftone collotype ====
Halftone collotype processes combine halftone printing and collotype. These include the Jaffetype, developed in Vienna; the Aquatone, developed and patented by Robert John in the United States in 1922, in which the gelatin is not reticulated; the Gelatone process, introduced in 1939; and the Optak process, introduced in 1946.

== Characteristics ==
Collotype was most often printed in monochrome in various colors of ink, most commonly black, brown, green, blue. In double-rolled collotype, the plate was first inked with stiff black ink and then re-inked with a softer colored ink; only one impression was taken. This process was most common in fancy postcards.

Collotype has a finely reticulated pattern that captures the tonal shifts of photography with a much more subtle effect that other photographic printing processes of the late 19th century, such as halftone engraving. Under magnification, the edges of the print appear as diffuse fine curved lines, unlike the more defined edges of relief or intaglio prints.

Richard Benson has described the finicky nature of collotype printing, primarily problems of registration with damp paper and the varied tones from sheet to sheet. As a young printer during the 1960s, Benson recalled how superstitious the collotype printers were because of the delicacy of the process.

As collotype is a hand-printed process, it can be printed on hand-made paper, which differentiates it from other forms of photographic reproduction.

== Historical use ==
The collotype printing process did not achieve commercial viability until Joseph Albert invented the first mechanized collotype press in 1868. Short runs can be printed on a proofing press, but longer print runs are carried out on a flatbed machine, where the plate is made square, level and fixed on the bed. The plate is then dampened with a slightly acidic glycerine–water mixture which is selectively absorbed by the different gel hardnesses, blotted before inking with collotype ink using a leather nap or velvet rollers. Best results are achieved with hard finished paper such as Bristol, placed upon the plate and covered with a tympan before slight pressure is applied. The collotype process uses much less pressure than other types of printing, such as lithography, letterpress or intaglio. While it is possible to print by hand using a roller or brayer, the best consistency in pressure and even distribution of ink is most effectively achieved on a mechanized press.

The collotype printing process was used for volume mechanical printing before the introduction of simpler and cheaper offset lithography. It can produce results difficult to distinguish from metal-based photographic prints because of its microscopically fine reticulations which compose the image. Many old postcards are collotypes. Its possibilities for fine art photography were first employed by Alfred Stieglitz in the United States and by the Youzheng and Shenzhou Guoguang publishing houses in China in 1908.

Because of its ability to print fine detail, it was also used for business cards and invitations with fine script lettering.

== Famous works ==
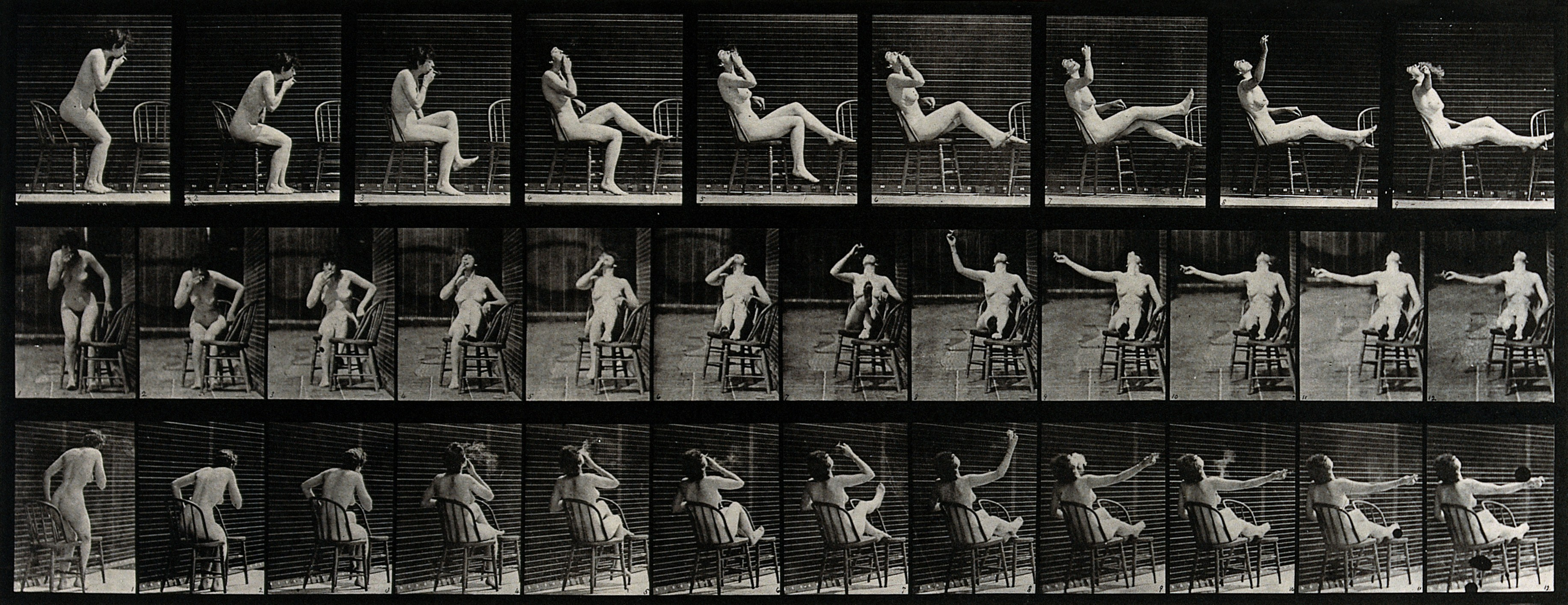
Eadward Muybridge's Animal Locomotion: an Electro-Photographic Investigation of Connective Phases of Animal Movements (1883–86, printed 1887) used collotype to print the photographs.

Eadward Muybridge's Animal Locomotion: an Electro-Photographic Investigation of Connective Phases of Animal Movements (1883–86, printed 1887) was printed in collotype from photographs transferred to gelatin.

After collotype had fallen out of commercial use, artists began to experiment with the process. Pablo Picasso's 1920 artist's book Le Tricorne was printed in (black) collotype with applied pochoir color. Surrealist Max Ernst printed the frottages in the portfolio Natural History (1926) in collotype. Marcel Duchamp's La Boîte-en-valise (Box in a Suitcase), produced in the 1930s and 1940s, combines the techniques of collotype and stencil to create its "copies." Gerhard Richter's Mao (1968) is a collotype portrait of Mao Zedong.

== Contemporary use ==
=== Commercial ===
As of 1983, there were only two commercial collotype firms in the United States, and as of 1997, there were no commercial collotype printers in the United States. As of 2015, there were two commercial collotype printers in Kyoto, Japan: Benrido and Shyniosha. In Europe, the firm Fratelli Alinari (Florence) and Lichtdruck-Kunst (Leipzig) still produce collotypes, primarily as high-quality art reproductions for museums.

=== Non-commercial or artistic ===
In 2010, only a small number of facilities in the United States, primarily art studios or organizations, still have the ability to create collotypes.

== Gallery ==
=== Monochrome collotypes ===
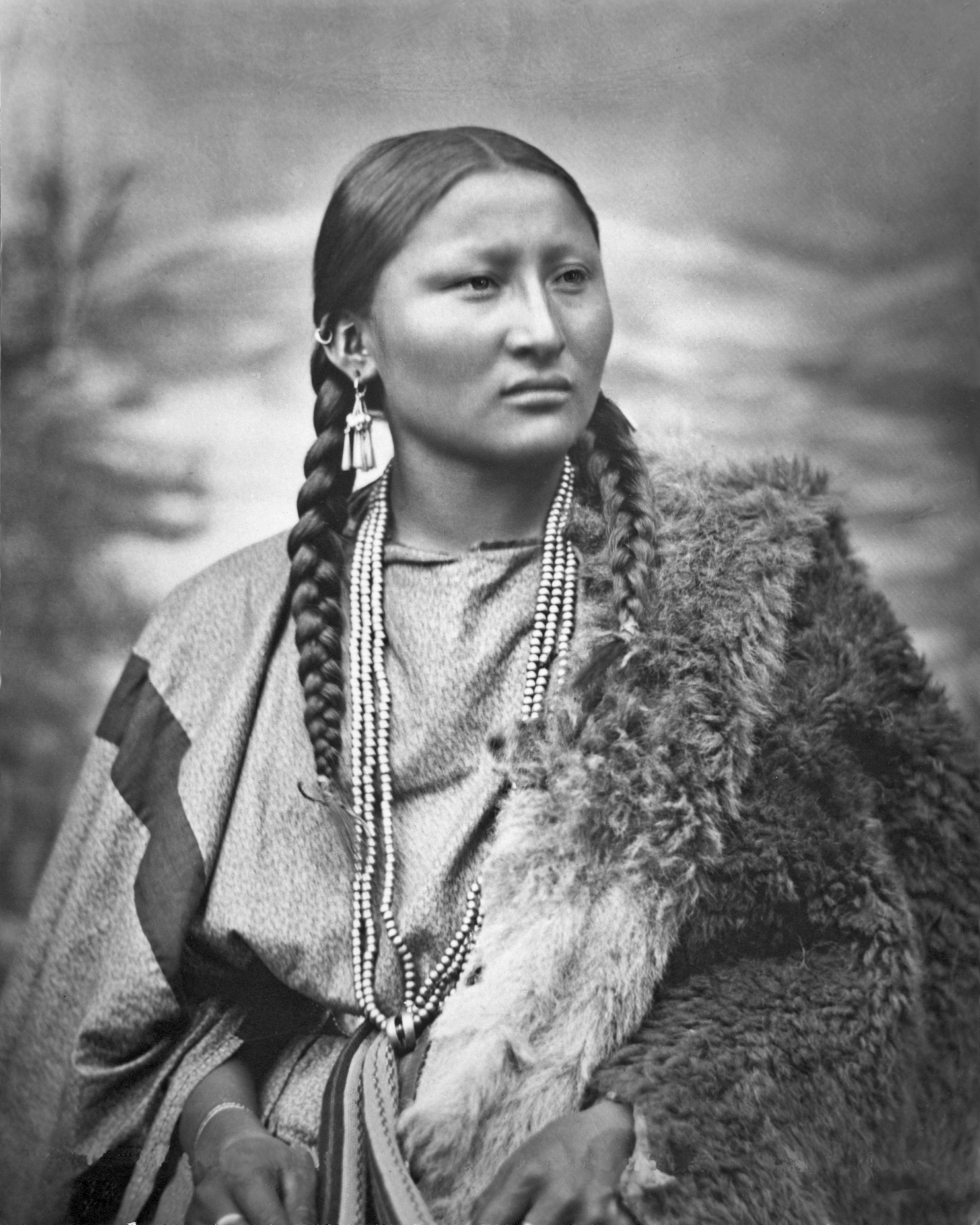
Pretty Nose, collotype with black ink, 1879.

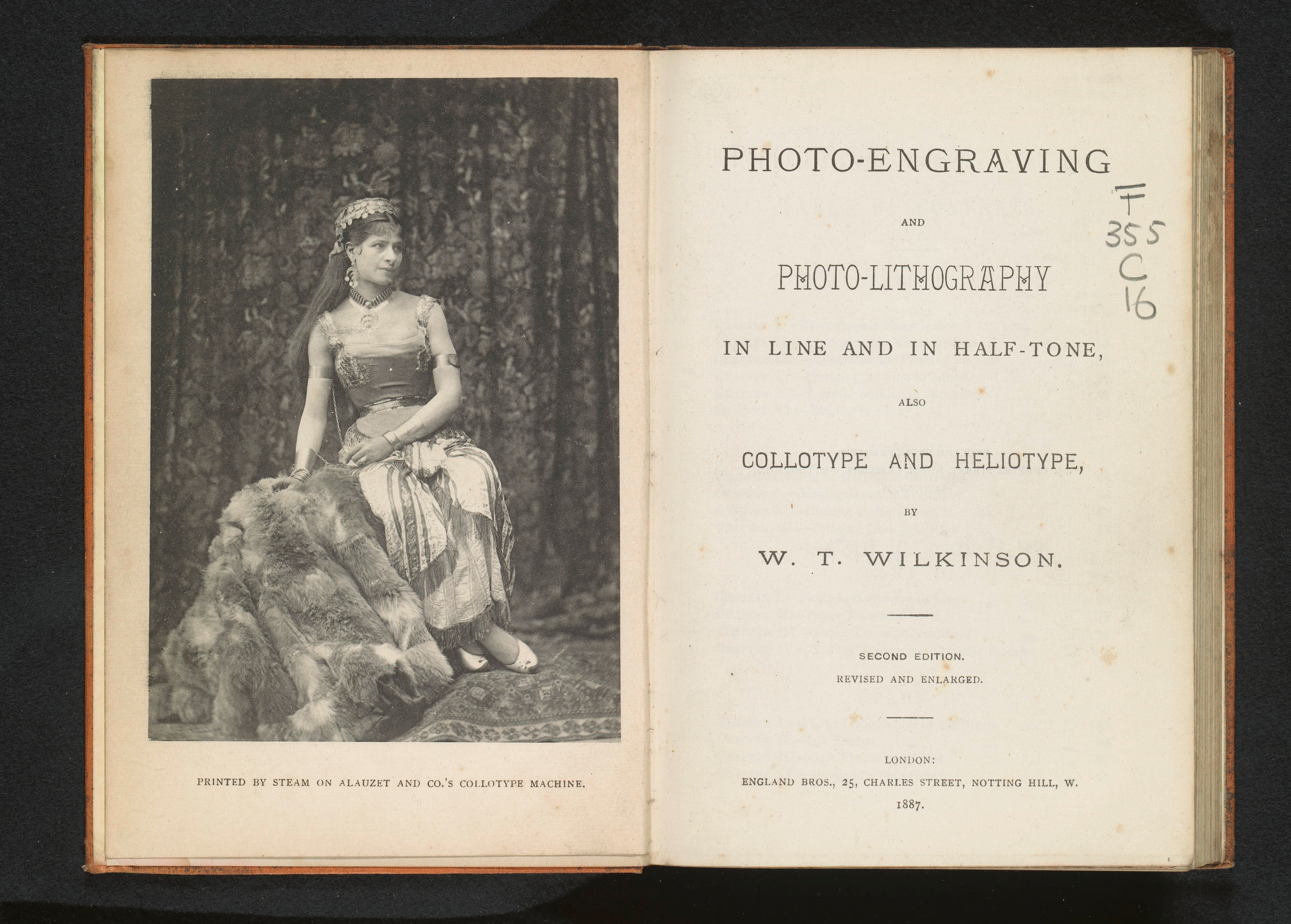
Collotype (on left page), 1887.

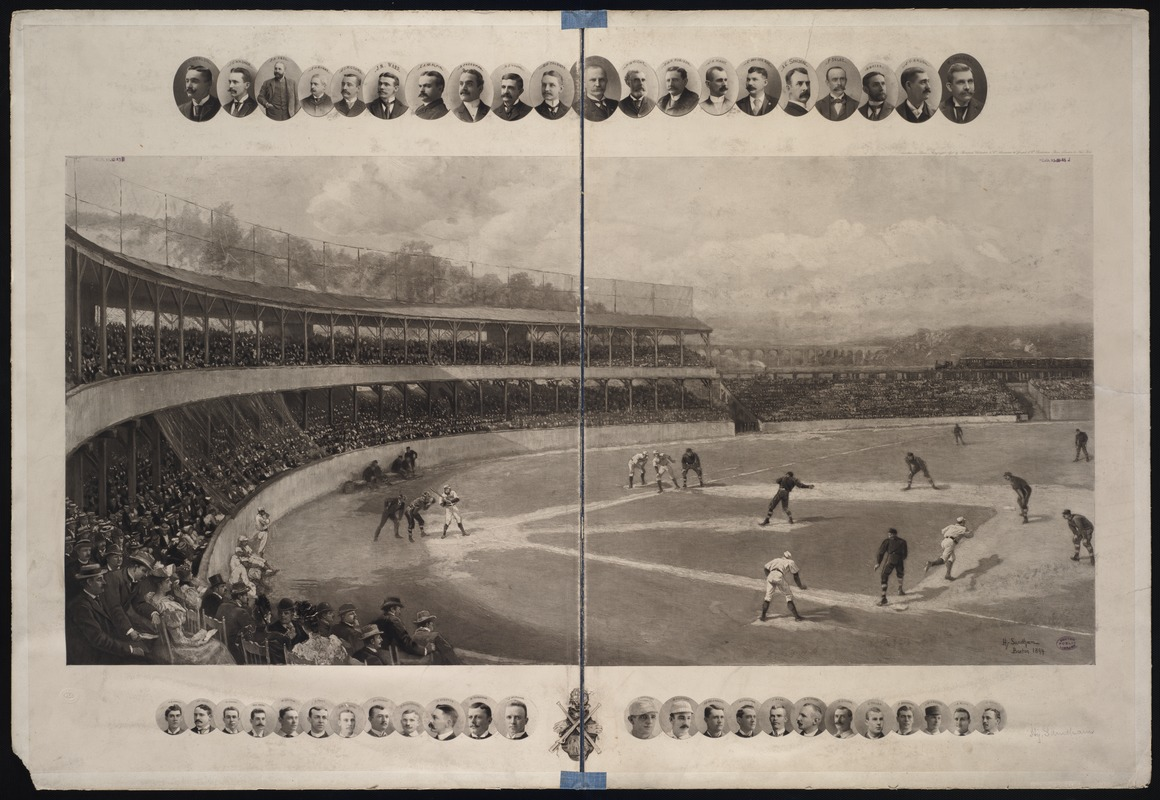
Collotype reproduction of original painting by Henry Sandham, 1896.

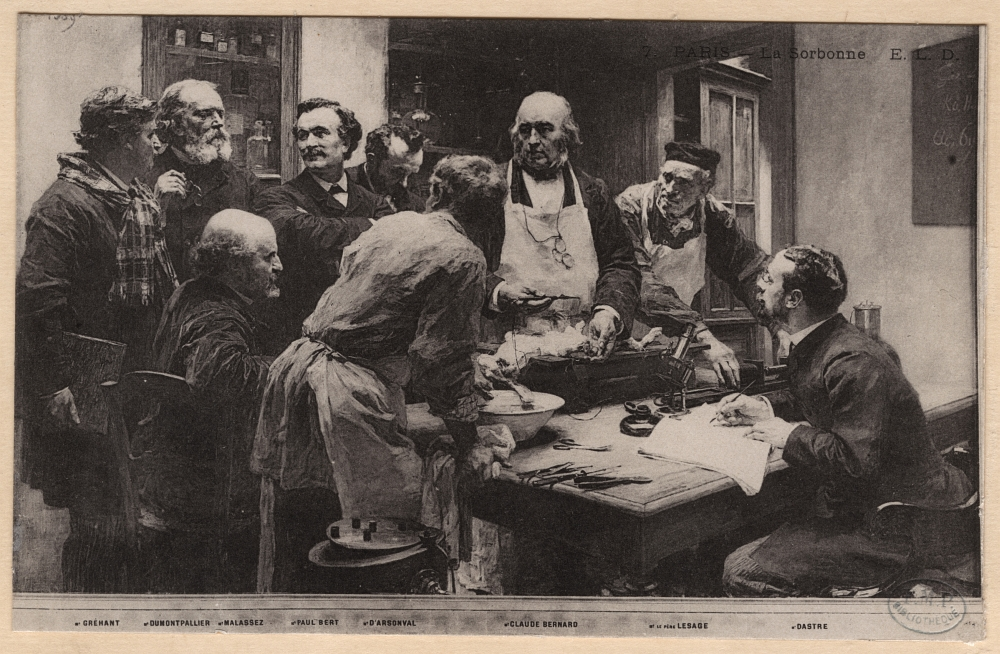
Collotype in black ink of a painting, 19th century.

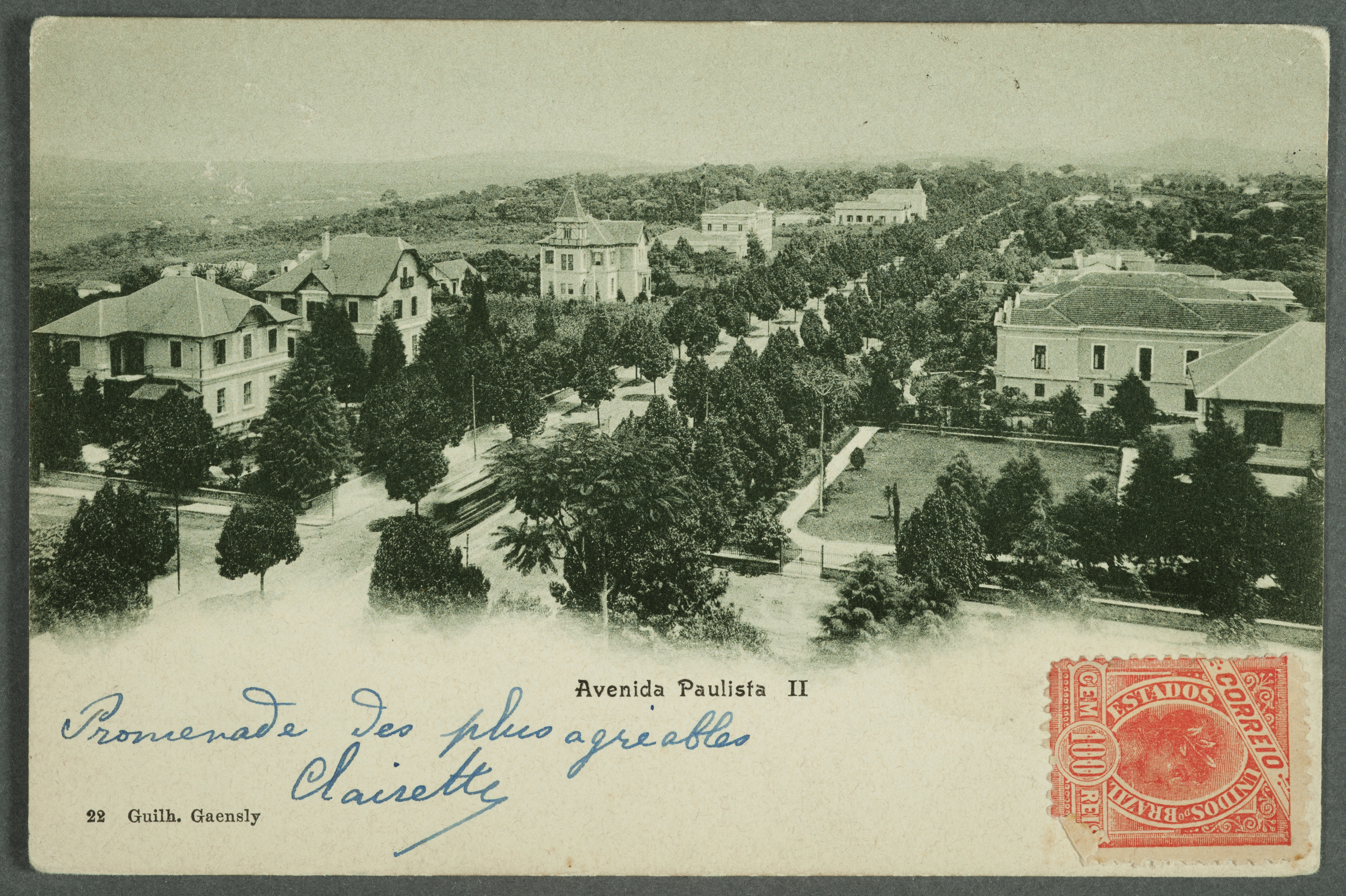
Collotype with green ink, 1908.

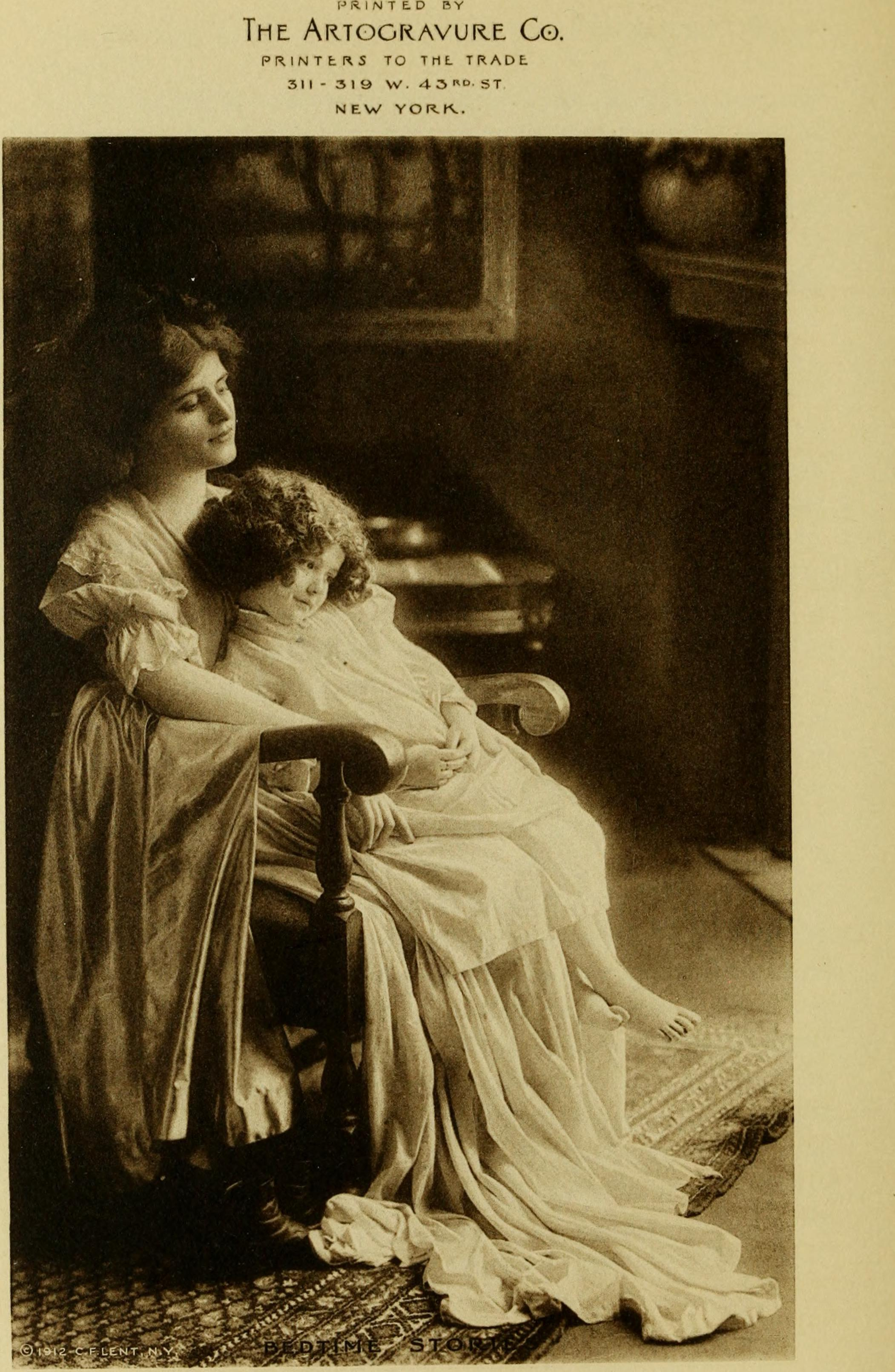
Collotype in sepia ink, 1913.

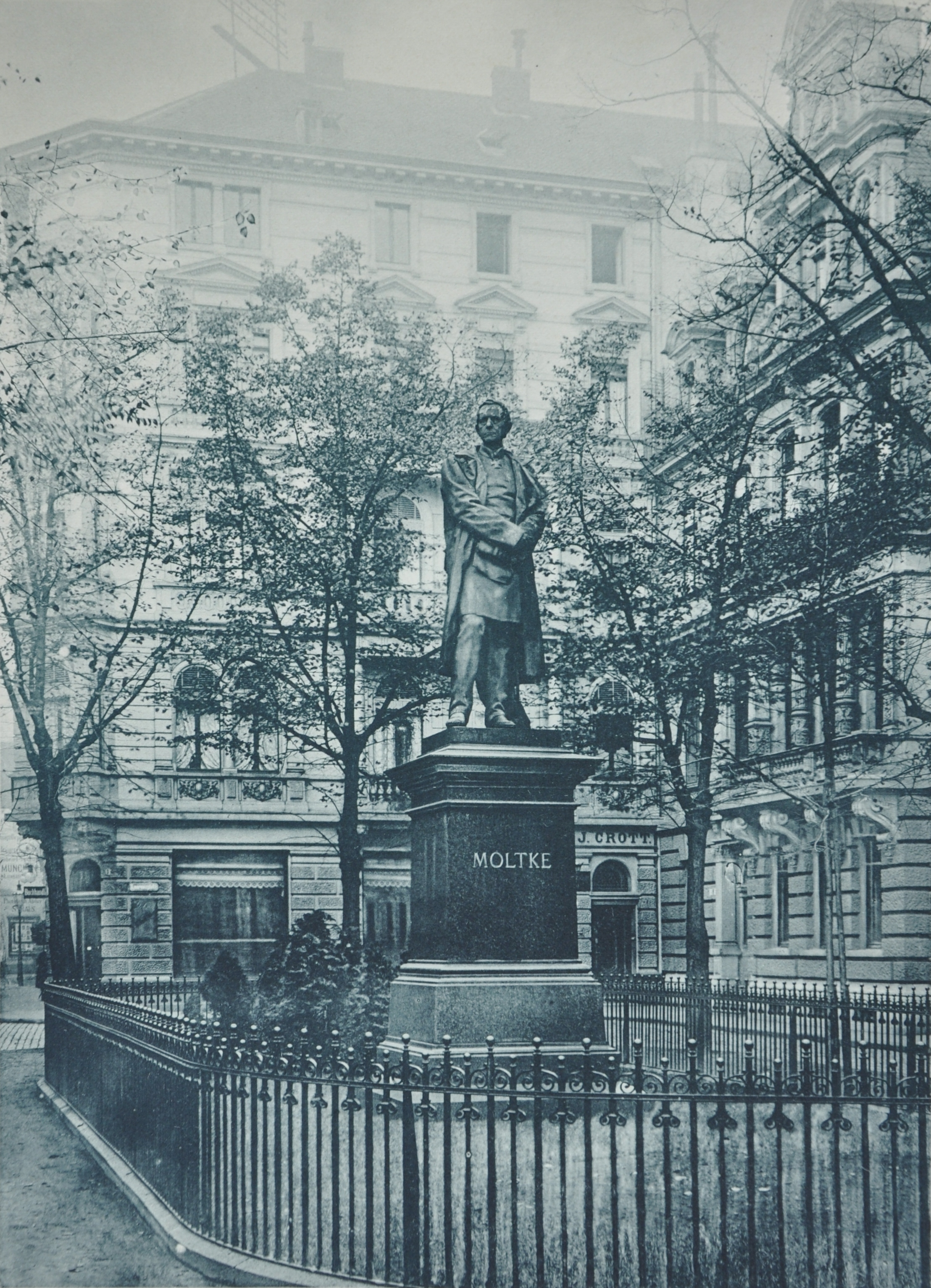
Collotype in blue-grey ink.

==== Monochrome collotypes with applied color ====
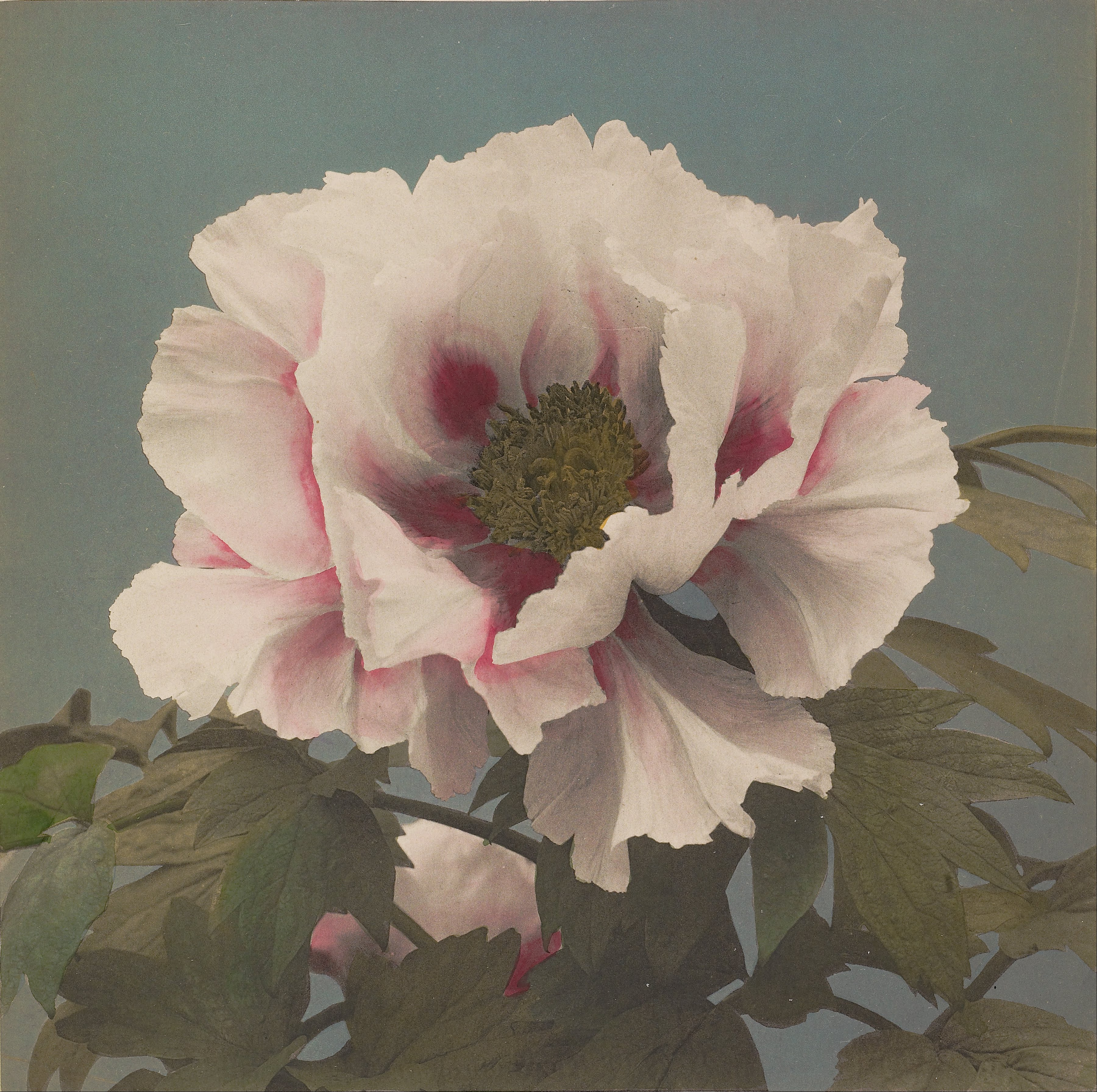
Hand-colored collotype, 1896.

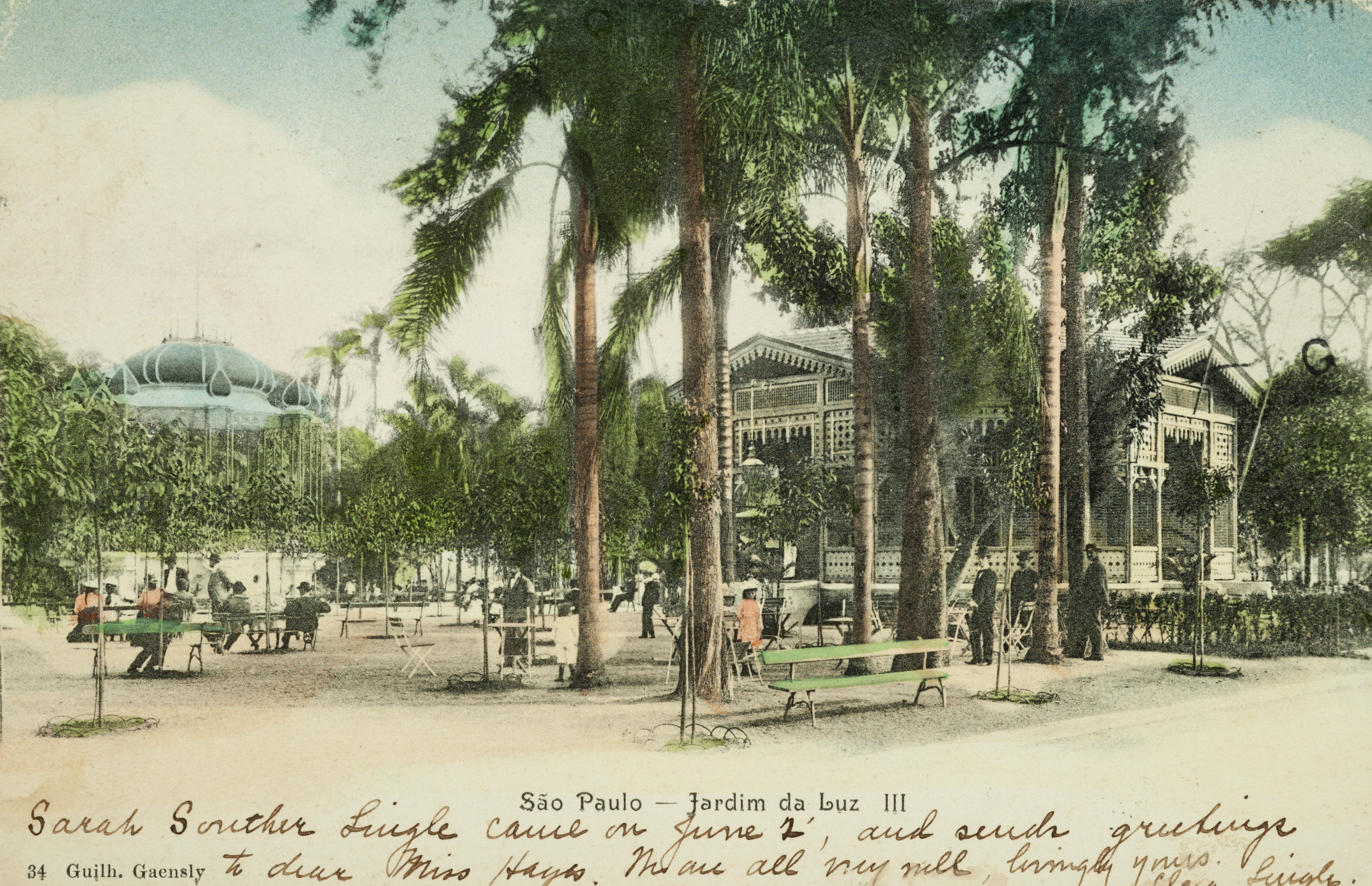
Collotype with handprinted color, 1900.

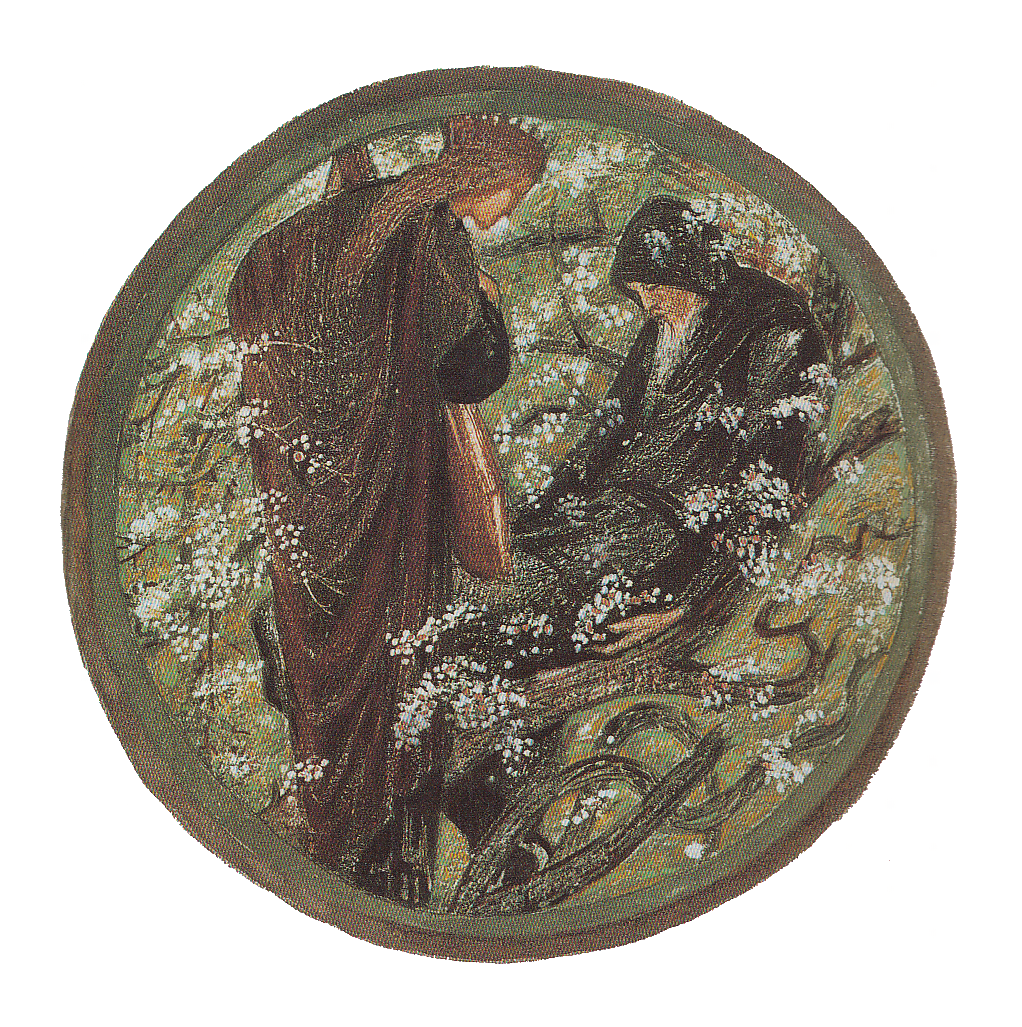
Edward Burne-Jones' The Flower Book (1905), collotype with applied pochoir.

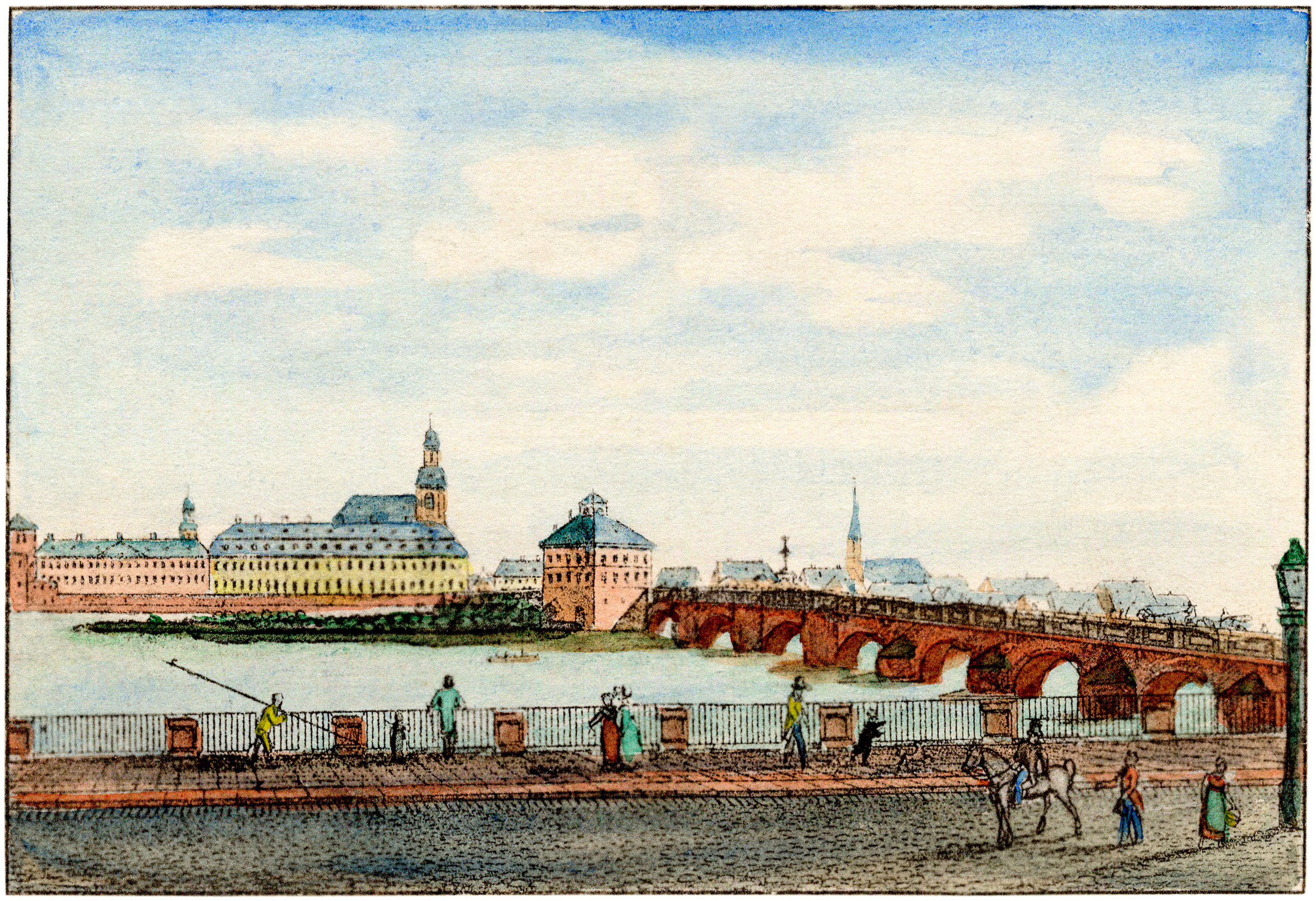
Collotype (of an engraving) with applied watercolor, 1913.

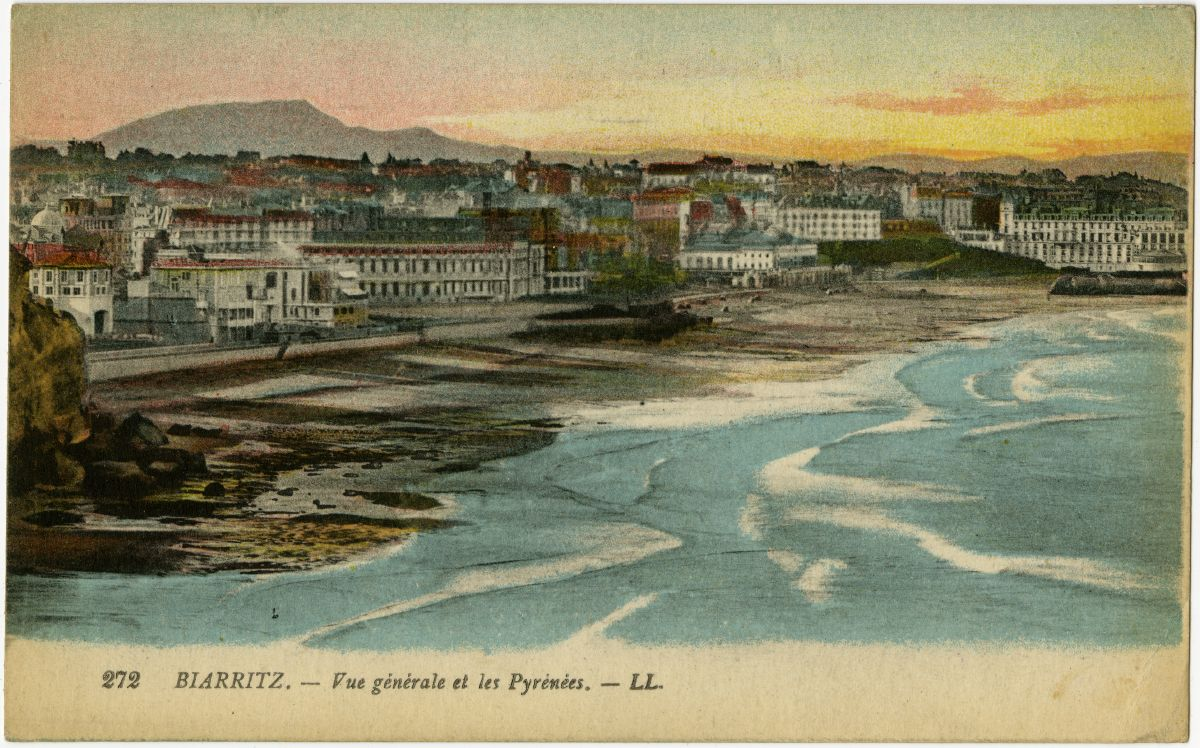
Postcard of Biarritz, collotype print with applied color, ca. 1916.

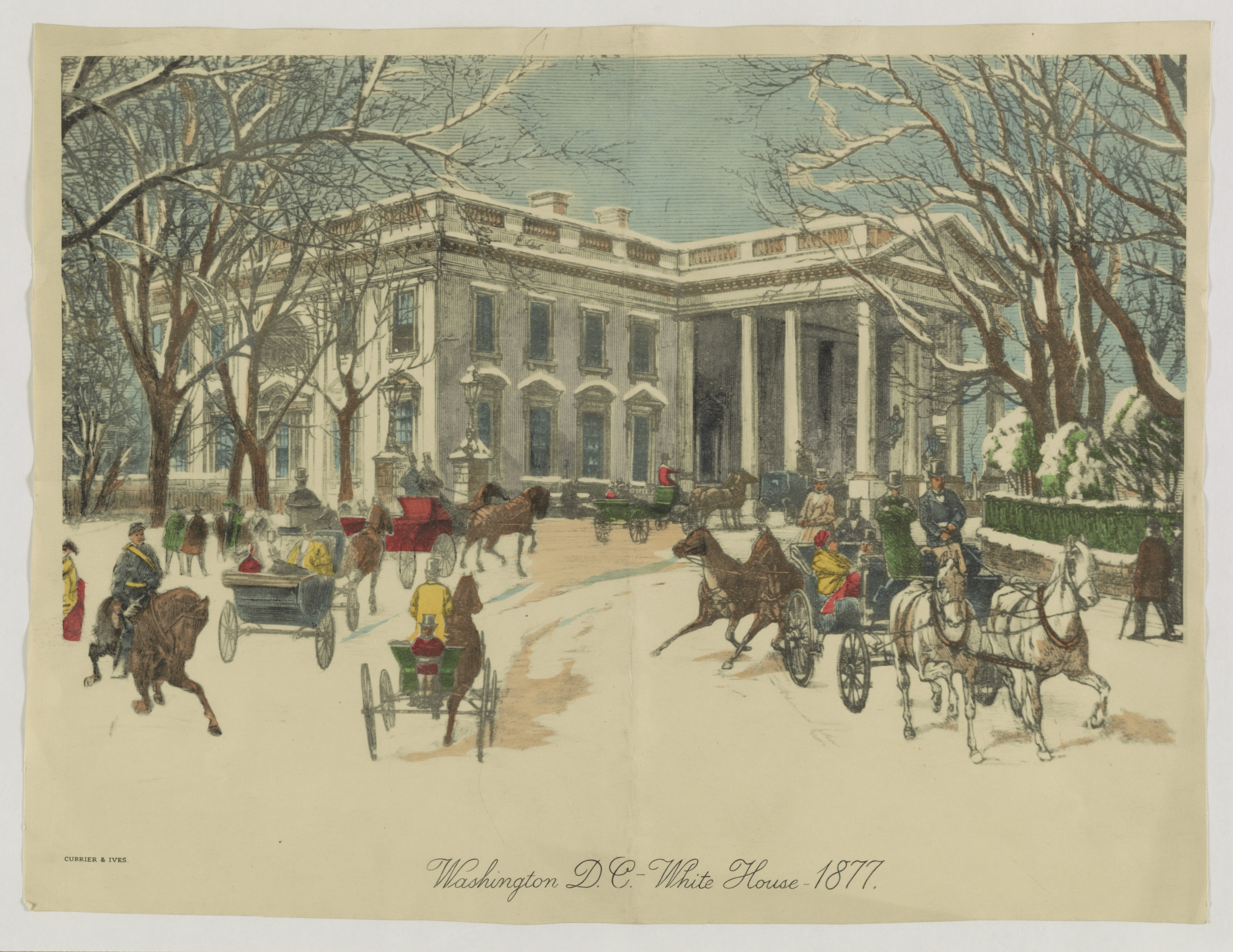
Hand-colored collotype, ca. 1877–1920.

=== Multicolored collotypes ===
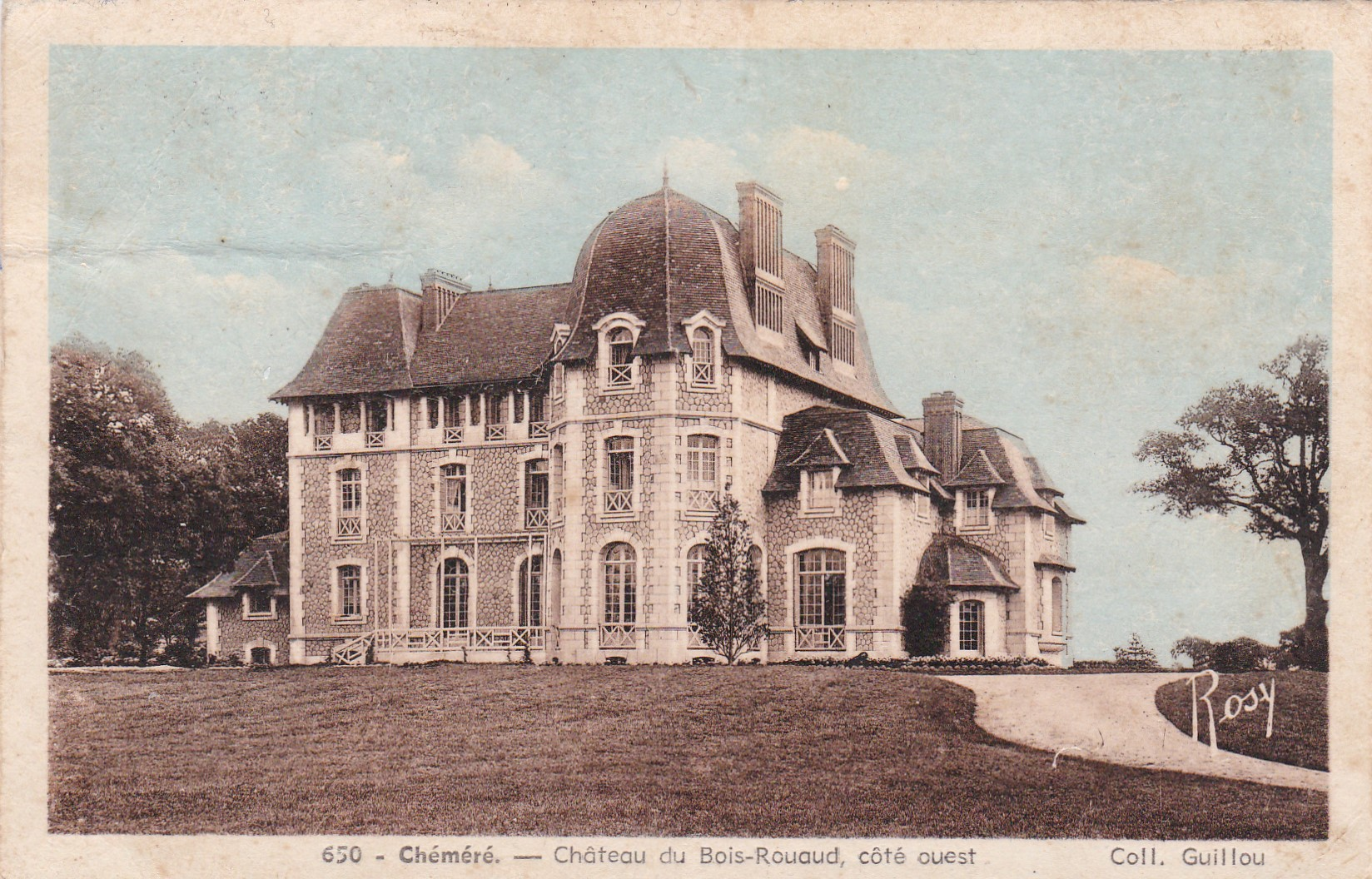
Collotype with brown and blue ink.

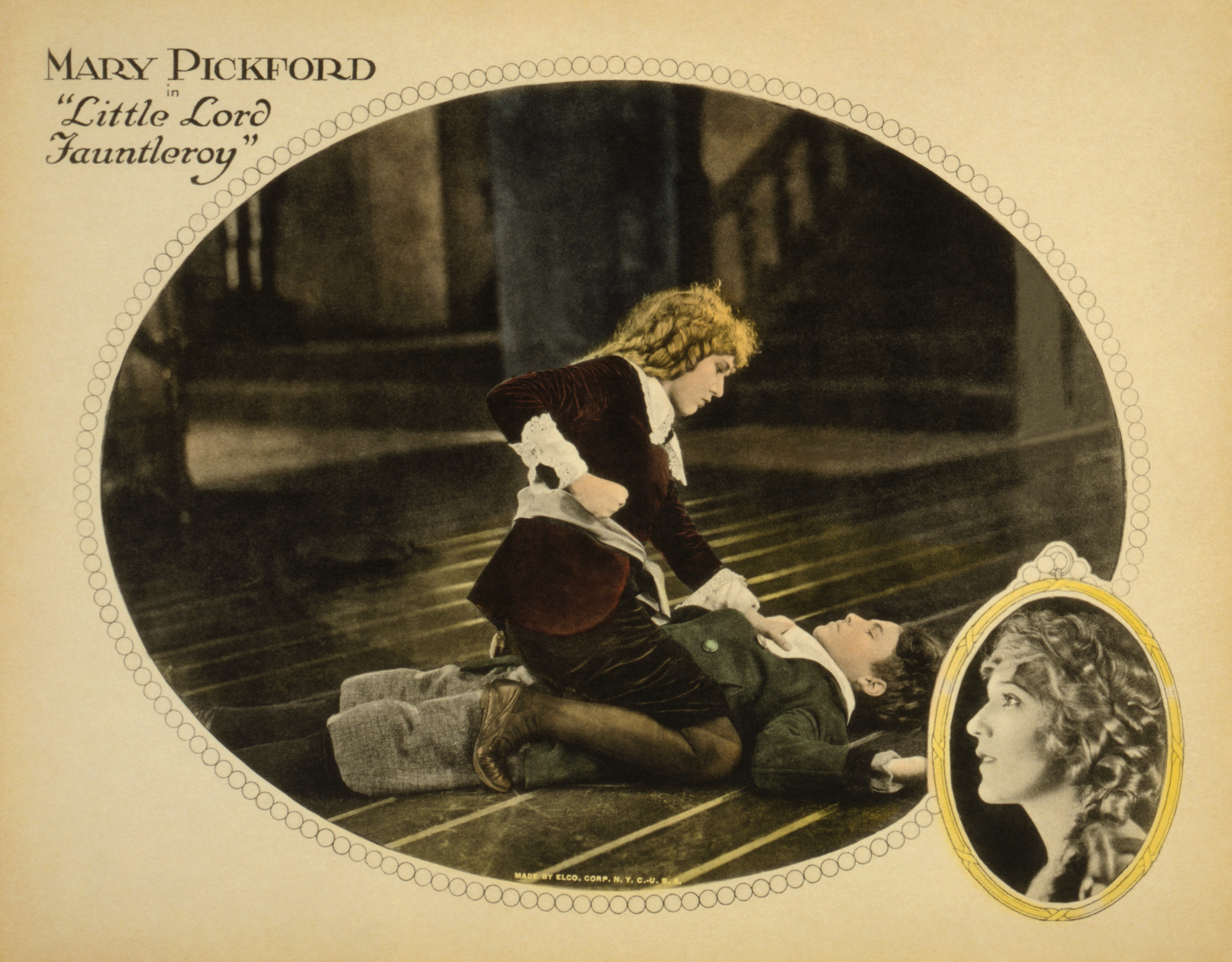
Lobby card of Mary Pickford, 1921.

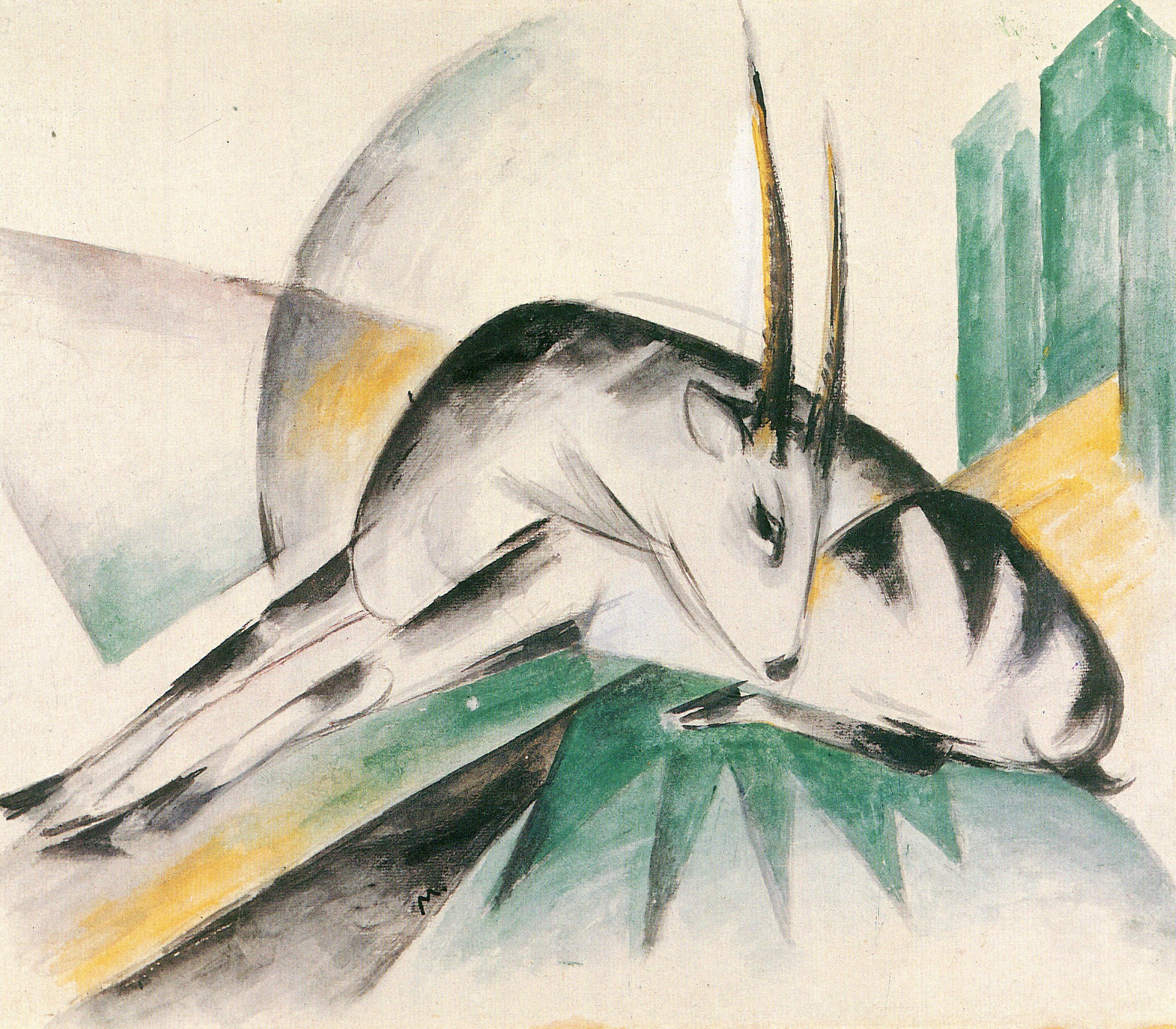
Gazelle by Franz Marc, 1923: a collotype reproduction of a painting.

== External sources ==
- Defibaugh, Denis (1997). The Collotype: & History, Process, Photographic Documentation [MA Thesis]. Rochester, NY: Rochester Institute of Technology.
- Dusan C. Stulik, Art Kaplan, Collotype. Getty Conservation Institute, 2013 (Atlas of Analytical Signatures of Photographic Processes)
- Video of collotype printing at Benrido Press, Kyoto, Japan (2009).
- http://collotype-vienna.com
