= Paper negative =

Photography Technique

The paper negative process consists of using a negative printed on paper (either photographically or digitally) to create the final print of a photograph, as opposed to using a modern negative on a film base of cellulose acetate. The plastic acetate negative (which is what modern films produce) enables the printing of a very sharp image intended to be as close a representation of the actual subject as is possible. By using a negative based on paper instead, there is the possibility of creating a more ethereal image, simply by using a type of paper with a very visible grain, or by drawing on the paper or distressing it in some way.

One of the original forms of photography was based on the paper negative process. William Henry Fox Talbot's paper negative process, which was used to create his work "The Pencil of Nature", used a negative created on paper treated with silver salts, which was exposed in a camera obscura to create the negative and then contact printed on a similar paper to produce a positive image.

When Talbot created this process it was intended to be a way to reproduce nature as accurately as possible (hence the name of his work, "The Pencil of Nature"). Through the years afterwards, however, better and more accurate ways of producing exact replicas of nature were developed, and these processes relegated the paper negative process to obsolescence.

The process of the paper negative is still relevant, though, in the realm of alternative-process photography. Photographers employing alternative processes reject the idea of the exact replica of nature and seek to use the inherent inexactness of antiquated processes to create a more personal and emotional image. The paper negative is an extremely versatile process that allows all manner of reworking and retouching of an image, and is the perfect medium to bridge the gap between camera operator and artist.

== See also ==
- Contact printing
- Calotype
- Paper texture effects in calotype photography
