= Paper texture effects in calotype photography =

Paper texture effects in calotype photography limit the ability of this early process to record low contrast details and textures. A calotype is a photographic negative produced on uncoated paper. (See Paper negative.) An important feature is that a relatively short exposure in a camera produces a latent image that is subsequently made visible by development. Then positive images for viewing are obtained by contact printing. This technique was in use principally from 1840 into the 1850s, when it was displaced by photography on glass. Skilled photographers were able to achieve dramatic results with the calotype process, and the reason for its eclipse may not be evident from viewing reproductions of early work.

== Background ==
Practical photography plausibly dates from the announcement of the Daguerreotype in 1839. This stimulated work by others: in 1840, the Englishman Talbot discovered what he called the calotype process for making photographic negatives on writing paper with the relatively short exposure time of a few minutes for subjects in bright sunlight. A positive print could subsequently be made by pressing a negative under glass against another piece of sensitive paper and exposing it to sunlight. For this, negatives were waxed to make them more transparent. Since many prints could be made from a single negative, travel photography became possible, and prints from calotypes were soon distributed in book form and sold in shops. The chemical operations used to make a calotype were not difficult to perform, and relatively few specialized supplies were required. But the process had a serious deficiency, and it was quickly replaced by photography on glass when this became practical.

== The role of paper texture ==
Paper texture limits what can be done with the calotype process. This texture can be seen by holding a piece of copier paper up to the light: the way fibers clump in the paper making process causes a relatively low contrast pattern that may remind one of bushes growing on a hillside. This pattern persists when paper is waxed, as similarly examining a piece of commercial waxed paper used for wrapping food will show. Since the contrast in the pattern is low, it does not interfere with tracing a drawing if the paper is thin enough for dark lines to show through. But it is very effective at obscuring low contrast patterns and textures and making them invisible. Consequently, calotype photographs can show bold outlines and high-contrast details clearly, but low-contrast details and textures tend to be lost because of non-uniform paper transmittance. Paper texture effects are limiting in nature photography, for example, where one expects to capture subtle patterns such as those produced by plants growing in close proximity or pebbles in a streambed. Early calotype photographers appear to have dealt with texture by composing with an eye for high contrasts and bold outlines. However, they sometimes resorted to inking in the sky areas of their negatives to eliminate distracting mottling. Information given in various works where calotype images are reproduced indicates that negative sizes of 20 x 25 cm (8 x 10 in) or greater were not unusual. This seems practical for a professional who planned to profit from the sale of contact prints that would be the same size as the original negative, but less so for an amateur because of the large amounts of silver nitrate required. The way paper texture effects become relatively more pronounced as negative size decreases can be demonstrated with a digital camera by photographing a sheet of paper lit from behind, first at a distance where the sheet just overfills the field of view, and then at a closer distance where the field of view is perhaps one third as wide. (A stack of the same paper will appear much more uniform if it is viewed by reflected light with diffuse illumination.) Anyone who wishes to make calotypes today should expect that otherwise successful negatives will suffer in comparison to the best surviving early work if a relatively small format such as 10 x 10 cm (4 x 4 in) is used. Despite the use of large formats and careful paper selection, continuing dissatisfaction with paper stimulated the invention of the collodion on glass process (see Collodion process) that quickly displaced calotypes after 1851, even though paper was the easier medium to work with.

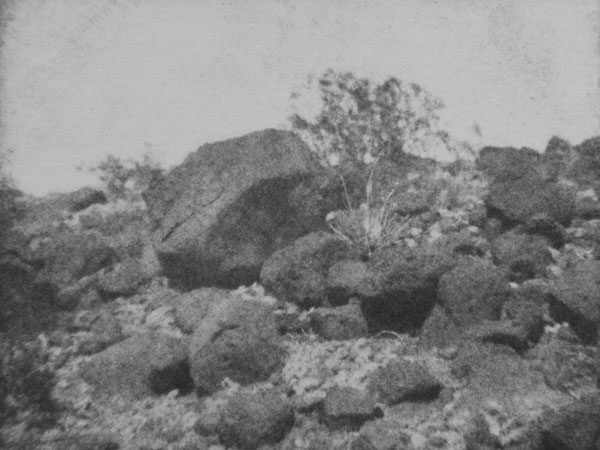
A contact print from a calotype paper negative. The original negative size was about 10 x 7.5 cm (4 x 3 in).

== Paper vs. negatives on glass ==
To understand why the calotype process could sometimes produce attractive results but was found to be generally unsatisfactory, it would be useful to compare pictures of the same subject taken with first paper and then with glass (or clear plastic film) as the negative substrate. An easier way to gain insight into the destructive effect of low contrast spurious texture is to view a relatively large format (not 35 mm) photographic negative in contact with a piece of tracing paper by transmitted light. Positives can be made with a digital camera and digital image processing so that the two cases, with and without the tracing paper, can be compared side by side. Viewed from a distance, the image made through the tracing paper may seem satisfactory. But from closer up, the paper texture will appear more intrusive and begin to camouflage low contrast scene details. This comparison will also demonstrate that paper texture is relatively coarse and, unlike pixelation in a typical digital image, does not quickly become inconspicuous as the distance from which it is viewed increases. Here it is significant to note that the scale of mottling in paper correlates to the average fiber length, which is on the order of millimeters, rather than to the much smaller fiber width.

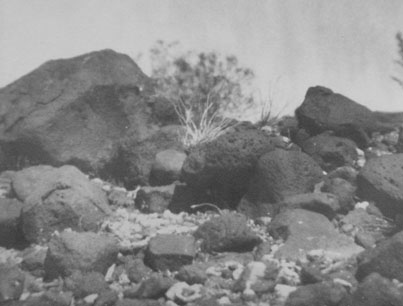
A contact print from a silver bromide/gelatin on glass negative. The same camera and the same contact printing process (cyanotype, reproduced here in gray scale) were used to make both images.

== Hazard warning ==
Silver nitrate and other materials used by early photographers are hazardous. Consult references to learn about potential hazards involved in duplicating their methods. Safety goggles are essential for eye protection.
