= Ultra large format =

Photographic film format

Ultra Large Format (ULF) photography refers to photography using cameras producing negatives larger than 8 in × 10 in (20 cm × 25 cm).

The ULF photography 'movement' has known a revival in the last few years, and is still expanding, along with film photography which, despite the very large market share of digital photography, still has many practitioners. Black and white panchromatic film in the various ULF sizes is still being produced, Ilford and Adox are two such manufacturers.

== Origins ==
In the 19th century photographic materials were not sensitive enough to light to allow for enlarging, and though after the advent of images on glass, enlargers became available in 1857 in the form of the solar camera, for most photographers they were too expensive and impractical until the 1880s when gas or electric light and faster materials arrived. Consequently, prints were made by contact which meant a large negative was needed if one wanted a large picture, which usually required a view camera.

== Advantages ==
- The sheer size of the negative allows for very precise detail reproduction.
- Large negatives can be used to make contact prints, which is a method used with many alternative photographic processes.
- Images produced have a presence that is difficult to obtain through any other means - mostly the quality of a contact print instead of enlargement.
- The view of the scene through such a huge ground glass is a remarkable experience, and allows much greater freedom in composition.
- ULF offers the opportunity to practice in-camera shooting, where sensitive paper (as opposed to negative/positive film) is placed in the film holder. This can be done also with conventional large format cameras, but of course the overall result - given the much smaller size - is less impressive and satisfactory.

== Encumbrances ==
- Ultra Large Format cameras, as well as lenses with sufficient image coverage for large film formats, are generally very costly and heavy.
- High cost of film - most films must be specially cut, and require custom film holders, often built by fine wood workers, as there are no international standards for film holders beyond 11 in × 14 in (28 cm × 36 cm) with the exception of 14" x 17" - the size of X-Ray and MRI films - which is indeed an international standard.
- Cumbersome to manipulate, which slows down the photographic process significantly. Logistics involving the camera also becomes challenging due to its size and weight.

== See also ==
- Enlarger
- Contact print
- Sheet film
- View Camera
