= Chromogenic print =

Photographic print made using a chromogenic process

A chromogenic print, also known as a C-print or C-type print, a silver halide print, or a dye coupler print, is a photographic print made from a color negative, transparency or digital image, and developed using a chromogenic process. They are typically made of three layers of gelatin containing a light-sensitive emulsion of silver halide; each layer contains a different dye coupler of subtractive color such that together, when developed, a full-color image is formed.

== History ==
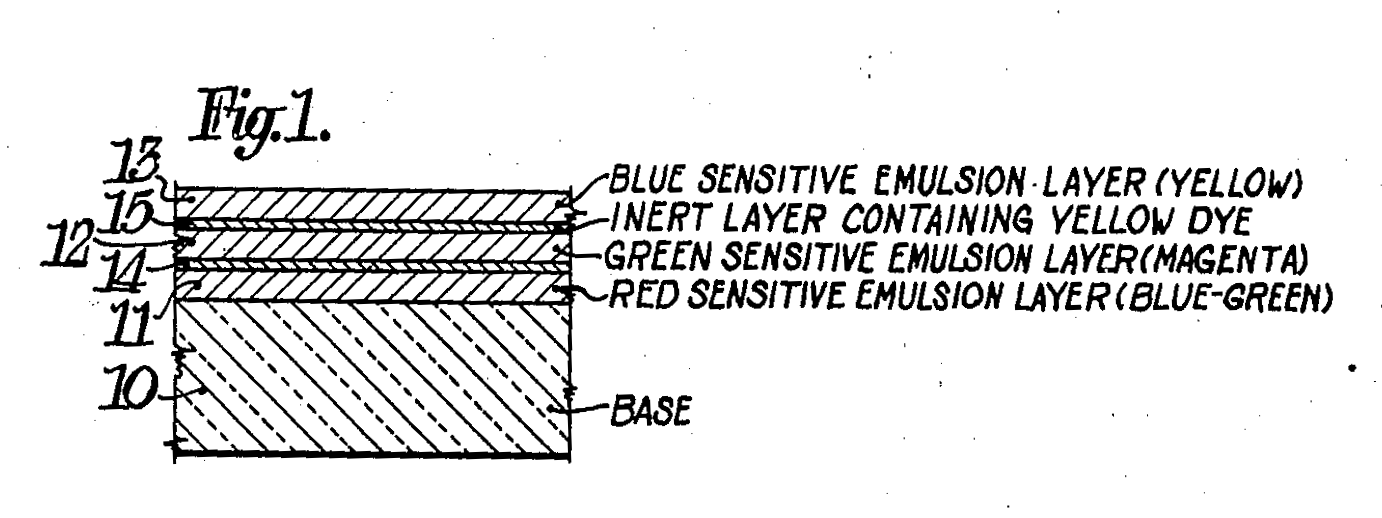
Figure from patent US2113329A, issued by Kodak, describing a photographic color process using color-coupling substances, such as the ones used in a chromogenic print.

Developing color by oxidizing a developer was first suggested by German chemist Benno Homolka who, in 1907, successfully developed water-insoluble dyes on a latent image by oxidation of indoxyl and thio-indoxyl, producing indigo-blue and red dye respectively. He noted these developers could create beautiful photographic effects.

The potential of developer oxidation products in a full-color photographic process, however, was first conceived by another German chemist, Rudolf Fischer, who in 1912 filed a patent describing a chromogenic process to develop both positives and negatives using indoxyl and thio-indoxyl-based color developers on a light-sensitive silver halide emulsion. The following year he filed a patent listing introducing the idea of a dye coupler: a compound spread throughout the emulsion layer that couples with the oxidized developer to form a dye. Fischer's patent goes on to list several developers and dye couplers which have historically been used in Agfachrome and are still in use today in Fujichrome Velvia, Provia and Ektachrome. In spite of this, Fischer never created a successful color print due to his inability to prevent the dye couplers from moving between the emulsion layers.

This first solution to this problem was devised by Agfa workers Gustav Wilmanns and Wilhelm Schneider. Their solution was to utilize dye couplers that are made of long hydrocarbon chains and ending with either a carboxylic or sulfonic acid group: The long hydrocarbon chains anchored the couplers in place, while the acid group on their ends enabled them to form micelles which are easily scattered in gelatin while also loosely tethering to it.^{:698} Agfa patented both the developer for this print and its photographic process, and promptly developed and released Agfacolor Neu in 1936, the world's first chromogenic print, a color print film that could be developed using a transparency.^{:698} Agfa developed a negative-to-positive chromogenic color film by 1939, which was possible to develop directly on the film's companion paper. While available to the German film industry at the time, the film was never publicly commercialized.

Kodak too worked to solve the issue of the dye couplers movement, and came up with a different solution. For their dye couplers, they used hydrocarbon chains that were significantly shorter than Agfa's and weren't ionically soluble, and then suspended them within droplets of water in the gelatin layers of the print.^{:698} In 1942, Kodak released Kodacolor, the first publicly available negative-to-positive chromogenic color film.

These prints were a much simpler-to-develop and cheaper counterpart to the color photography alternatives at the time. This shift meant chromogenic color prints became increasingly popular in amateur photography, and by the 1960s they overtook black and white printing in the amateur photofinishing market.

In 1955, Kodak introduced a chromogenic paper named "Type C", which was the first color negative paper Kodak sold to other labs and to individual photographers. Although the paper's name was changed to "Kodak Ektacolor Paper" in 1958, the term "Type-C Print" persisted, and became a popular name for negative-to-positive chromogenic prints which is still in-use today. "Type-R Print", meanwhile, became the name of the reversal film counterpart.

Notwithstanding their commercial success in the amateur and professional market, chromogenic prints weren't considered a medium for fine-art photography up to the 1970s. Pioneers in the fine-art usage of chromogenic prints in particular, and of color photography as a whole, include photographers such as Ernst Haas, which was profiled by the Museum of Modern Art in its first exhibition of color photography in 1962.^{:257} Other pioneers in this field include William Eggleston^{:251} and Stephen Shore, among many others. Their works had elevated chromogenic prints to the preferred medium for contemporary photography by the 1990s.

Chromogenic prints made from negatives became obsolete with the release of chromogenic digital prints, which have become the most common photographic print today.

== Development of prints ==
Chromogenic processes are characterized by an oxidation of the developer by metallic silver, followed by a coupling reaction between the oxidized developer and the different dye couplers to produce the colors that make up the full-color image:

Following the film's exposure, the 3 layers of a light-sensitive silver halide emulsion form a latent image. A developer is then added, which gets oxidized by regions of metallic silver. Subsequently, this oxidized product couples with the different dye couplers in each of the layers, forming different dyes. By using dye couplers of 3 subtractive colors, their coupling with the oxidized developer produces a full-color image. This coupling reaction also anchors the created dyes in the emulsion, allowing the print to be bleached and fixed: To better preserve the print, the remaining metallic silver is bleached by a strong oxidizer, returning it to its previous state as a silver halide. The silver halide, meanwhile, is solubilized by a fixer, allowing the silver ions to be removed from the emulsion layers. The exposure of a chromogenic print may be accomplished with a traditional photographic enlarger using color filters to adjust the color balance of the print.

The print's name is derived from the chromogenic coupling reaction between the dye coupler and the oxidized developer.

== Chromogenic print today ==
Chromogenic prints, like most color photographic prints, are developed using the RA-4 process. As of 2017, the major lines of professional chromogenic print paper are Kodak Endura and Fujifilm Crystal Archive. Plastic chromogenic "papers" such as Kodak Duratrans and Duraclear are used for producing backlit advertising and art.

== Reversal film prints ==
A reversal film chromogenic print, also known as a Type-R print, is a positive-to-positive photographic print made on reversal-type color photographic paper.

Fujifilm, Kodak, and Agfa have historically manufactured paper and chemicals for the R-3 process, a chromogenic process for making Type-R prints. As of 2008, all of these companies have ceased to produce Type R paper, although Fujifilm still has some stocks remaining.

Another positive-to-positive process was Ilfochrome, formerly Cibachrome, in use until 2012. This is sometimes also referred to as a Type-R process. Ilfochrome was a dye destruction process, with materials, processing, and results quite different from the R-3 process.

== Digital chromogenic prints ==
A digital chromogenic print, sometimes known as digital Type-C print, Lambda print or LightJet print, is a chromogenic print made from a digital file rather than a negative, and exposed using digital exposure systems such as the Durst Lambda, Océ LightJet and ZBE Chromira. The LightJet and the Lambda both use RGB lasers to expose light-sensitive material to produce a latent image that is then developed using conventional silver-based photographic chemicals. The Chromira uses light-emitting diodes (LEDs) instead of lasers. All of the aforementioned printers utilize ICC color profiles to achieve color and density accuracy and also to correct paper sensitivity errors. The same technology can also be used to produce digital silver gelatin bromide black and white prints.
