= Printer point =

In photography, a printer point is a unit of relative exposure, in printing a negative, equal to a 1/12 of a stop or 0.025 Log(base 10) unit (one-fortieth of a decade) of exposure ratio.

This numbering scheme is used in photographic printing and photographic filters. Printer points were also used to specify color timing for photochemical film processing, particularly for motion pictures shot on film.

Increasing or decreasing the light by twelve points increases or decreases the exposure by a factor of two. Such adjustments are used for darkness and color adjustment in photographic enlargers, for example. A one-stop change in the exposure of a negative may require only an adjustment of about 6 to 8 printer points in printing, depending on the gamma of the film.
