= Lego Wars =

Photograph series using Star Wars and fashion trademarks

Lego Wars is a photography series by the American photographer Dale May, begun in 2011. It consists of macro studio photographs of Star Wars–themed Lego minifigures, presented at large scale and, in several works, juxtaposed with luxury fashion branding. It was the subject of an exhibition at the Samuel Owen Gallery in Greenwich, Connecticut, in 2011 and 2012, and appeared in magazines including People, Marie Claire, and Glamour.

== Concept and technique ==
For the series, May photographed small plastic Star Wars Lego figures using macro photography, lighting and composing them to emphasize detail and to give them what one writer described as a heroic, larger-than-life presence. May has said the work was intended to return the figures to the "epic importance" they held for him in childhood, while retaining their quality as toys.

The prints are produced as large chromogenic prints, face-mounted to archival acrylic and backed with aluminum, a presentation chosen to give the works a high-gloss surface resembling the plastic of the original toys. Individual works were issued in multiple sizes, the largest measuring 48×48 in (122×122 cm) Some figures based on the Star Wars droid C-3PO were also produced as translucent prints mounted in LED light panels.

== Fashion works ==
Several images in the series pair Lego figures with the branding of luxury fashion houses. Coco Vader presents a Darth Vader figure in the style of Chanel, V3PO renders a gold C-3PO figure in a Louis Vuitton monogram pattern, and Chewy Burch references the designer Tory Burch. Other works in the series use the colour associated with the jeweller Tiffany & Co. Writers noted May's attention to detail, including his alteration of logos within the images to incorporate an "LW" monogram for Lego Wars.

== Exhibition ==
Lego Wars was the subject of a solo exhibition at the Samuel Owen Gallery in Greenwich, Connecticut from December 15, 2011 to January 19, 2012. The opening was scheduled early in the evening so that children could attend with their parents, and a costumed figure was present at the reception. The Samuel Owen Gallery represents May.

== Reception ==
The series appeared in the national and design press, including People, Marie Claire, and Glamour. The reviewer for the design blog If It's Hip, It's Here gave a mixed assessment of May's broader photography but praised the Lego Wars works specifically, writing that the style "works" for the series and that the images showed "an eye for composition" not as evident in his other work. Coverage frequently emphasized the series' combination of nostalgia, pop culture, and commercial branding.
