= RA4 =

RA4 may refer to:

- The RA-4 process, a photographic print process
- (11835) 1985 RA4, a minor planet
- RA4 an untrimmed paper size slightly larger than A4
