= Durst =

Equipment manufacturer

Durst Phototechnik AG
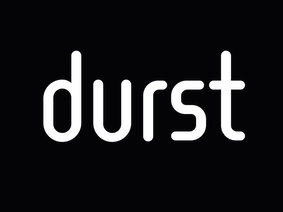
- Industry: Printer Manufacturer
- Founded: 1936; 90 years ago
- Founder: Julius and Gilbert Durst
- Headquarters: Brixen, Italy
- Products: Photographic printing equipment
- Number of employees: 250 (2017)

Durst is an Italian manufacturer of photographic printing equipment.

== History ==
Durst was established in 1936 by brothers Julius and Gilbert Durst. They were photography enthusiasts who were encouraged by their mother, who was also a keen photographer and had her own darkroom.

== Products ==
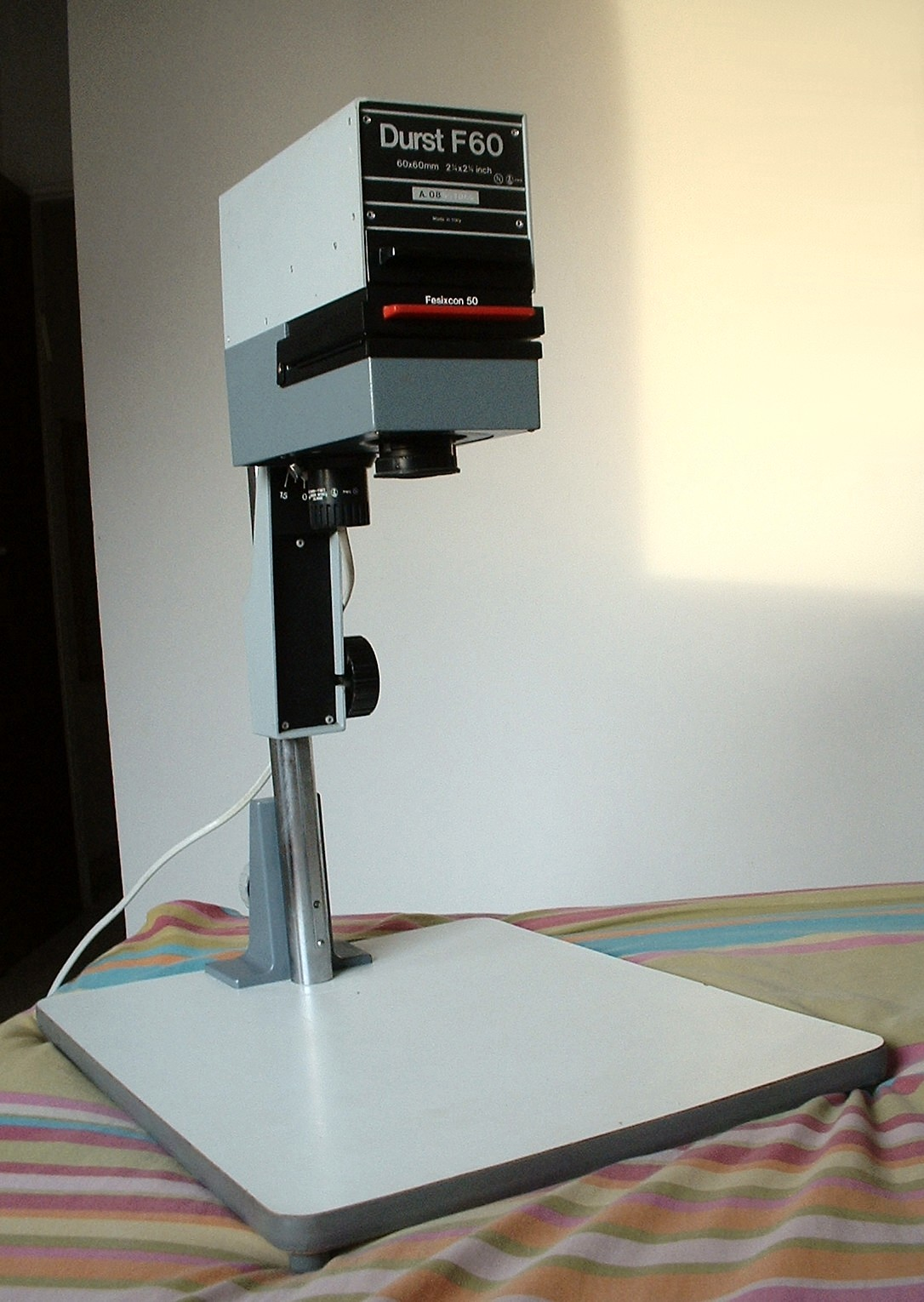
A Durst F60 enlarger

Durst ended production of their enlargers in late 2006 due to a drop in sales, probably due to growth of minilabs and later digital imaging. In the 70 years of manufacturing enlargers their sales peaked in 1979 with 107,000 sold. Durst have filed over 500 patents for various components and designs of enlargers.

Now, Durst produce a range of photochemical (Durst Lambda and Theta printers) and super wide format inkjet printers based on UV polymerization ink technology. The quality of the output of these products is exceptional, as was the case with the company's historical enlargers, for high quality image reproduction and high versatility of application, from paper and plastic materials to ceramics and wood.

== Lambda and Theta photographic printers ==
The Durst Lambda and Theta models are widely used in the photographic printing industry to produce digital C-Type prints on light sensitive colour and monochrome papers and transparency display materials such as Kodak Duratrans and Duraclear. Images are produced by exposing light sensitive material with RGB laser light which is then developed through the relevant chemical process. The Lambda is a standalone machine that requires a separate chemical processor and takes a roll of paper 50 inches (130 cm) wide, whereas the Theta uses a roll measuring 30 inches (76 cm) and has its chemical processor built in. The Theta is also capable of holding two different paper types at once.

The Durst Lambda is a continuous roll-to-roll single beam, three-laser (RGB) exposure system giving total size flexibility and achieves an image quality which is superior to all large format printers - photographic, inkjet and electrostatic). The Durst Lambda exposes digital information (raster pixel) directly to conventional photographic media at full continuous tone with a linear writing speed of up to 65 cm (26 in.) per minute with the choice of two resolutions of 200 and 400 ppi (equal to an apparent resolution of 4000 dpi). The Lambda produces images with the highest possible resolution (68 billion colours) and with a radiometric repeatability of 0.025 D per colour. Prints can be produced to an infinite length and when the 50 inch paper width is exceeded, images are automatically divided-up and exposed in strips.

— source:Techniques, Metro Imaging

== Durst inkjet printers ==
Durst expanded in 2003 into UV Curable Digital Inkjet Printers with the Rho 160, and now produces a full line of Large Format, Textile, Ceramic, Label and Industrial Inkjet printers for a variety of applications. The Durst Rho 500 Roll-to-Roll Printer and the Durst Rho P10-250 Flatbed Printer have both won "Product of the Year" at the Specialty Graphics Industry Association Awards.
