= Easel =

Upright frame for holding or displaying

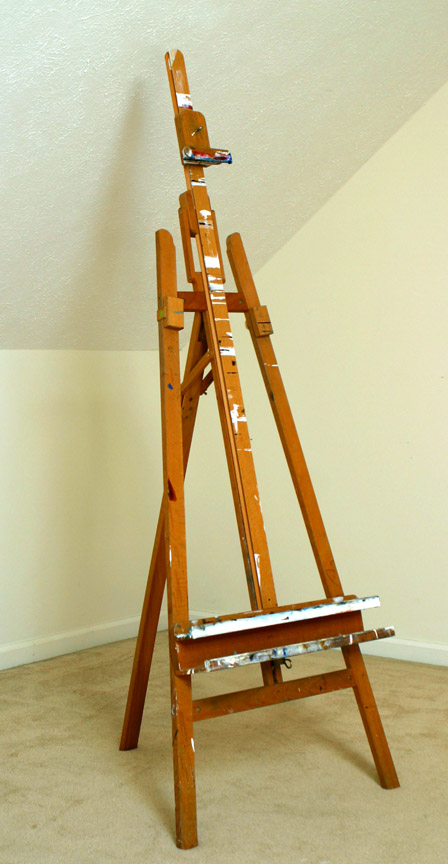
An example of a tripod design easel with an inclining mechanism built in.

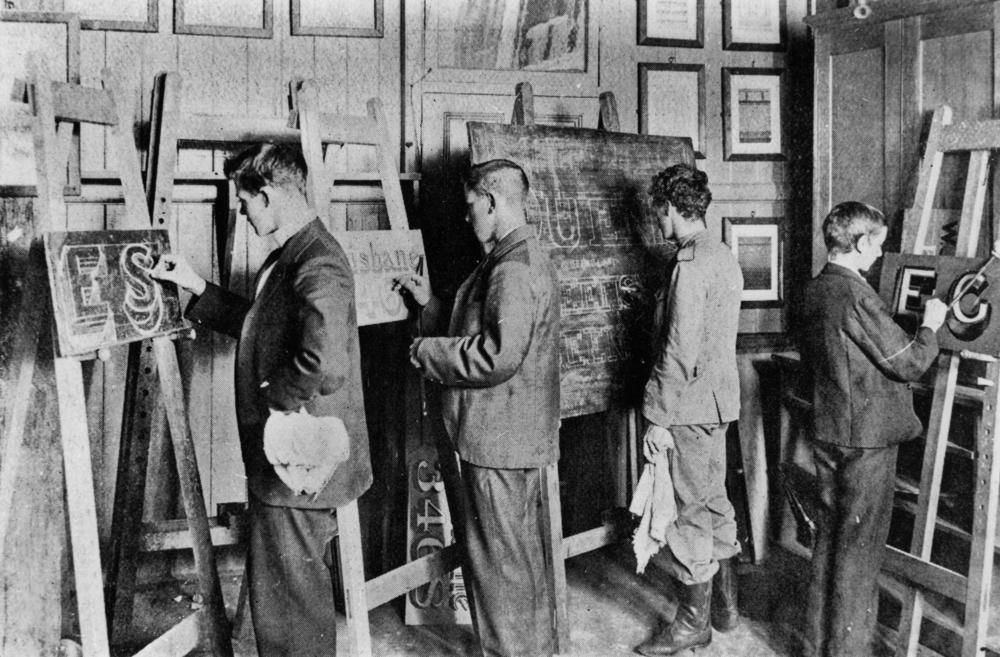
Brisbane Technical College Signwriting class, ca. 1900

An easel is an upright support used for displaying or fixing something resting upon it, at an angle of about 20° to the vertical. In particular, painters traditionally use an easel to support a painting while they work on it, normally standing up; easels are also sometimes used to display finished paintings and prints. Artists' easels are still typically made of wood, in functional designs that have changed little for centuries, or even millennia, though new materials and designs exist. Easels are typically made from wood, aluminum or steel.

Easel painting is a term in art history for the type of midsize painting that would have been painted on an easel, as opposed to a fresco wall painting, a large altarpiece or other piece that would have been painted resting on a floor, a small cabinet painting, or a miniature created while sitting at a desk, though perhaps also on an angled support. It does not refer to the way the painting is meant to be displayed; most easel paintings are intended for display framed and hanging on a wall.

In a photographic darkroom, an easel is used to keep the photographic paper in a flat or upright (horizontal, big-size enlarging) position to the enlarger.

== Etymology ==
The word easel is an old Germanic synonym for donkey (compare similar semantics). In various other languages, its equivalent is the only word for both the animal and the apparatus, such as Afrikaans: esel and earlier Dutch: ezel (the easel generally in full Dutch: schildersezel, "painter's donkey"), themselves cognates of the Latin: asinus (ass).

== History ==
Easels have been in use since the time of the ancient Egyptians. In the 1st century, Pliny the Elder made reference to a "large panel" placed upon an easel.

Around 1810s, Empress Marie-Louise reportedly presented an easel with the monogram of Napoleon's last consort to her painting teacher, miniaturist Jean-Baptiste Isabey.

== Design ==
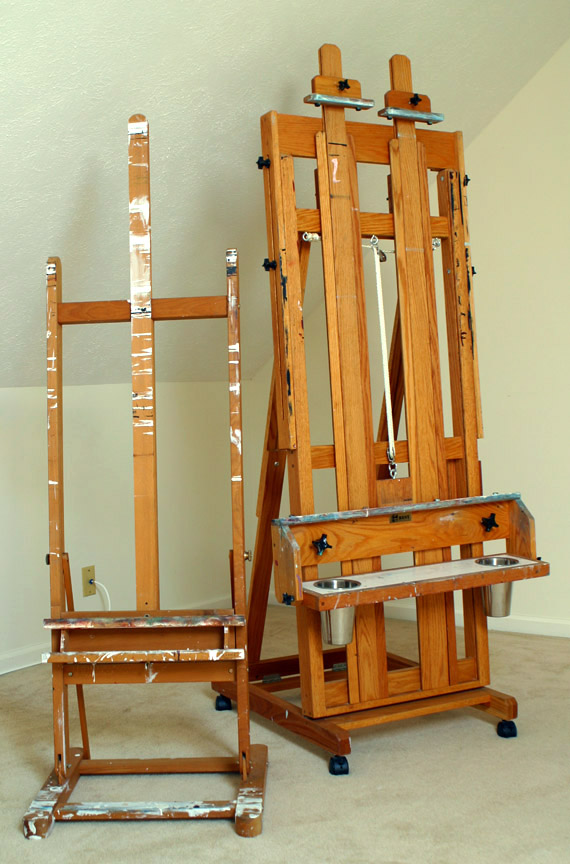
Two examples of H-frame easels.

There are three common designs for easels:

- A Frame designs are based on three legs. Variations include: crossbars to make the easel more stable; and an independent mechanism to allow for the vertical adjustment of the working plane without sacrificing the stability of the legs of the easel.
- H-Frame designs are based on right angles. All posts are generally parallel to each other with the base of the easel being rectangular. The main, front portion of the easel consists of two vertical posts with a horizontal crossbar support, giving the design the general shape of an 'H'. A variation uses additions that allow the easel's angle with respect to the ground to be adjusted.
- Multiple purpose designs incorporate improved tripod and H-frame features with extra multiple adjustment capabilities that include finite rotational, horizontal and vertical adjustment of the working plane.

== Differences ==
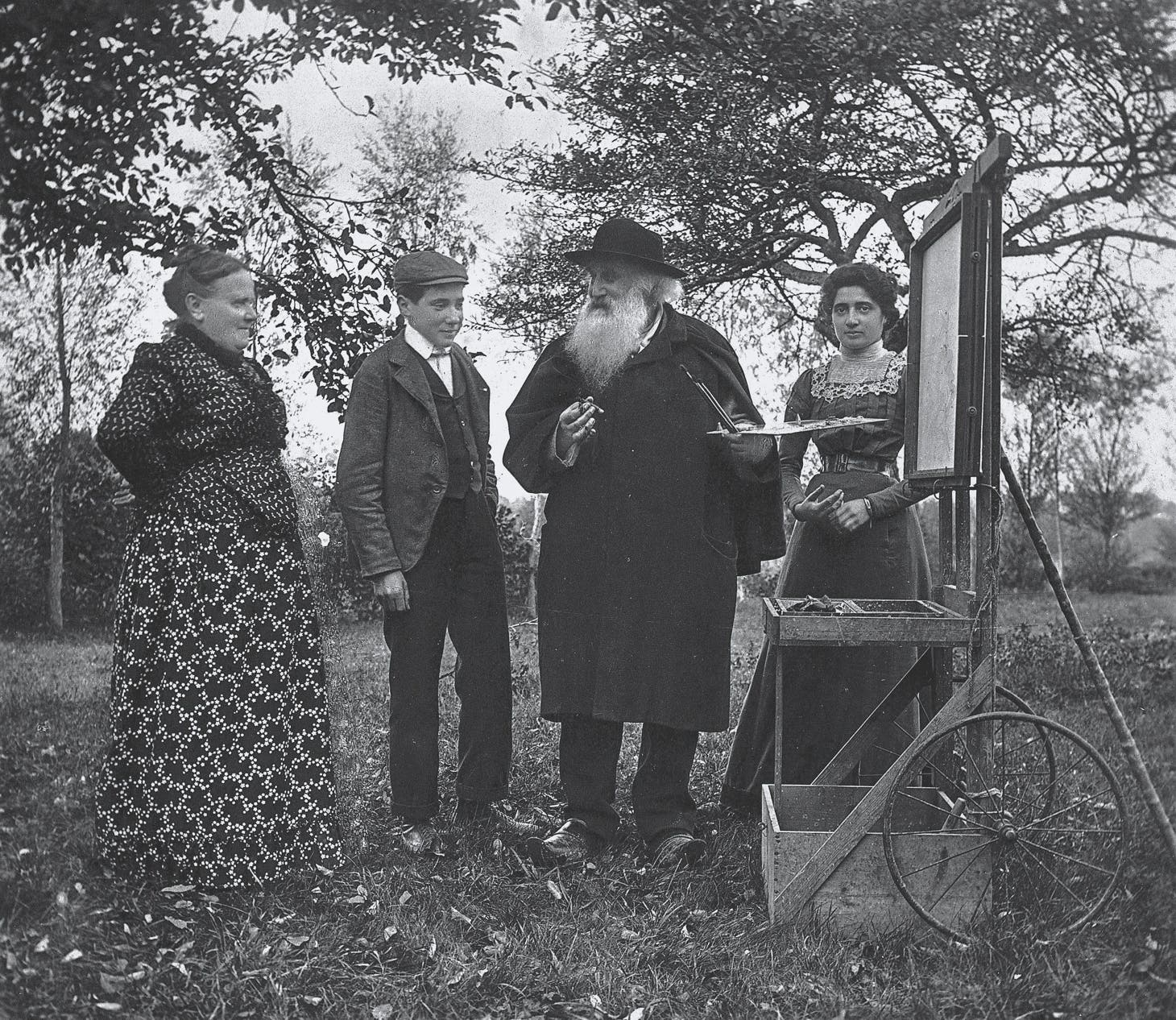
Pissarro with his family at his mobile easel, Éragny, 1901 Archives Musée Camille Pissarro

An easel can be full height, designed for standing by itself on the floor. Shorter easels can be designed for use on a table.

- Artists' easels typically are fully adjustable to accommodate for different angles. Most have built-in anti-skid plates on the feet to prevent sliding. They are collapsible and overall very slim in stature to fit in small spaces around the studio. The simplest form of an artist's easel, a tripod, consists of three vertical posts joined at one end. A pivoting mechanism allows the centre-most post to pivot away from the other two, while the two non-pivoting posts have a horizontal cross member where the canvas is placed. A similar model can hold a blackboard, projection surface, placard, etc.
- Pochade boxes are a type of artists' easel that is mounted on top of a camera tripod. They include both a support for the painting, as well as a palette. They may or may not include a box for supplies.
- Paint stations are meant as more stationary consoles. These are usually equipped with various holsters, slots and supporting platforms to accommodate for buckets, brushes and canvas styles. Most of the components can be broken down for easy cleaning and storage.
- Children's easels are intended to be more durable. They are typically shorter than standard easels and usually come equipped with dry erase boards and/or chalkboards attached.
- Display easels are for display purposes and are meant to enhance the presentation of a painting.
- Facilitation easels are for capturing audience or participant input and are meant to involve the participants with the content.
- Darkroom easels keep photographic paper in a flat or upright (horizontal, big-size enlarging) position to the enlarger.

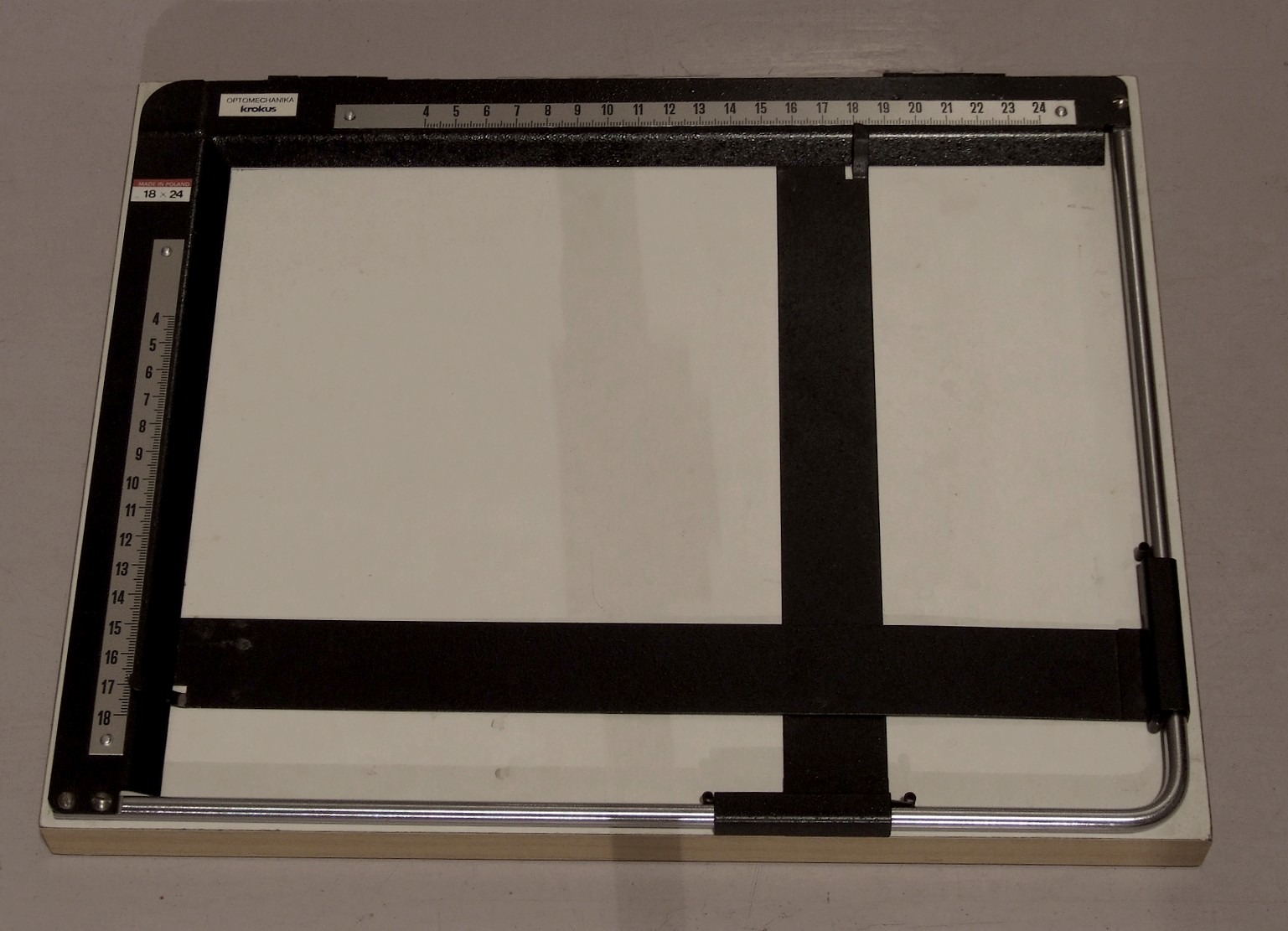
Photographic easel mask

== Use ==
It is most often used to hold up a painter's canvas or large sketchbook while the artist is working, or to hold a completed painting for exhibition.

Here are some common uses for easels:

- Studio easels are meant for use in the artist's studio with limited need for the easel to be portable. Studio easels may be simple in design or very complex, including winches, multiple masts and casters. The largest easels are studio easels, with some being able to support panels weighing over 200 pounds and measuring over 7 feet in height.

- Field easels or plein air easels are meant to be portable for the creation of en plein air work. These easels are usually midsize or small, have telescopic or collapsible legs and are based on the tripod design. French box easels include a compartment in which to store art supplies conveniently along with a handle or straps so that the French box may be carried like a briefcase or a backpack.
- Display easels are meant for the display of finished artworks. These easels tend to be very simple in design with less concern for the stability needed by a working artist. Display easels vary in size and sturdiness depending upon the weight and size of the object to be placed on them.
- Facilitation easels hold large pads of paper and have trays for holding markers of varying colors
- Mini easels are similar in design to display easels but scaled down to accommodate photos or flyers
- Darkroom easels hold photographic paper perfectly flat during exposure. Some of these easels are designed with adjustable, overlapping, flat steel "blades" to crop the image on the paper to the desired size while keeping an unexposed white border around the image.
