= Pear switch =

Type of electrical switch that usually looks like a small pear

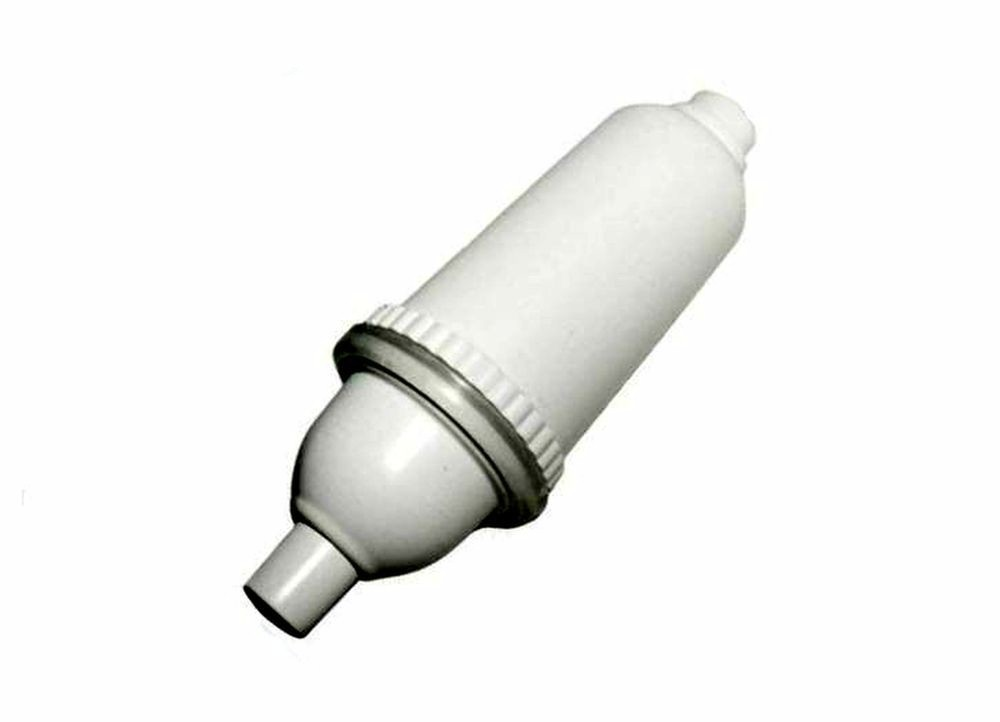
- A typical pear switch.
- Component type: Electrical switch
- Working principle: Mechanical actuation

A pear switch is a particular type of electrical switch that usually has the appearance of a small pear. Its operation is very simple, with a button that, depending on the type, is pressed to activate or deactivate a circuit or is simply pressed like a pushbutton, for example in photographic enlarger switches.

It is characterized by its form and function. Unlike conventional switches that are fixed to the wall, the pear switch is suspended from the cable. By pressing the pear, the electrical contacts close the circuit. Its most common use is for hanging lamps, bed headboards, bedside tables, or generally in situations where you do not want to mount the switch on the wall.

== Description ==
Pear push button

It is pear-shaped, oval or spherical, made of wood or plastic, which is connected to a mechanism that has a spring with an electrical contact. It is an automatic mechanism with a spring, similar to a push button but taking into account that there is a model that is bistable and returns the switch to its default position after pressing twice, changing the initial condition of the electrical circuit or restaurant, connecting or blocking the circulation of current in said electrical circuit.

== Models ==
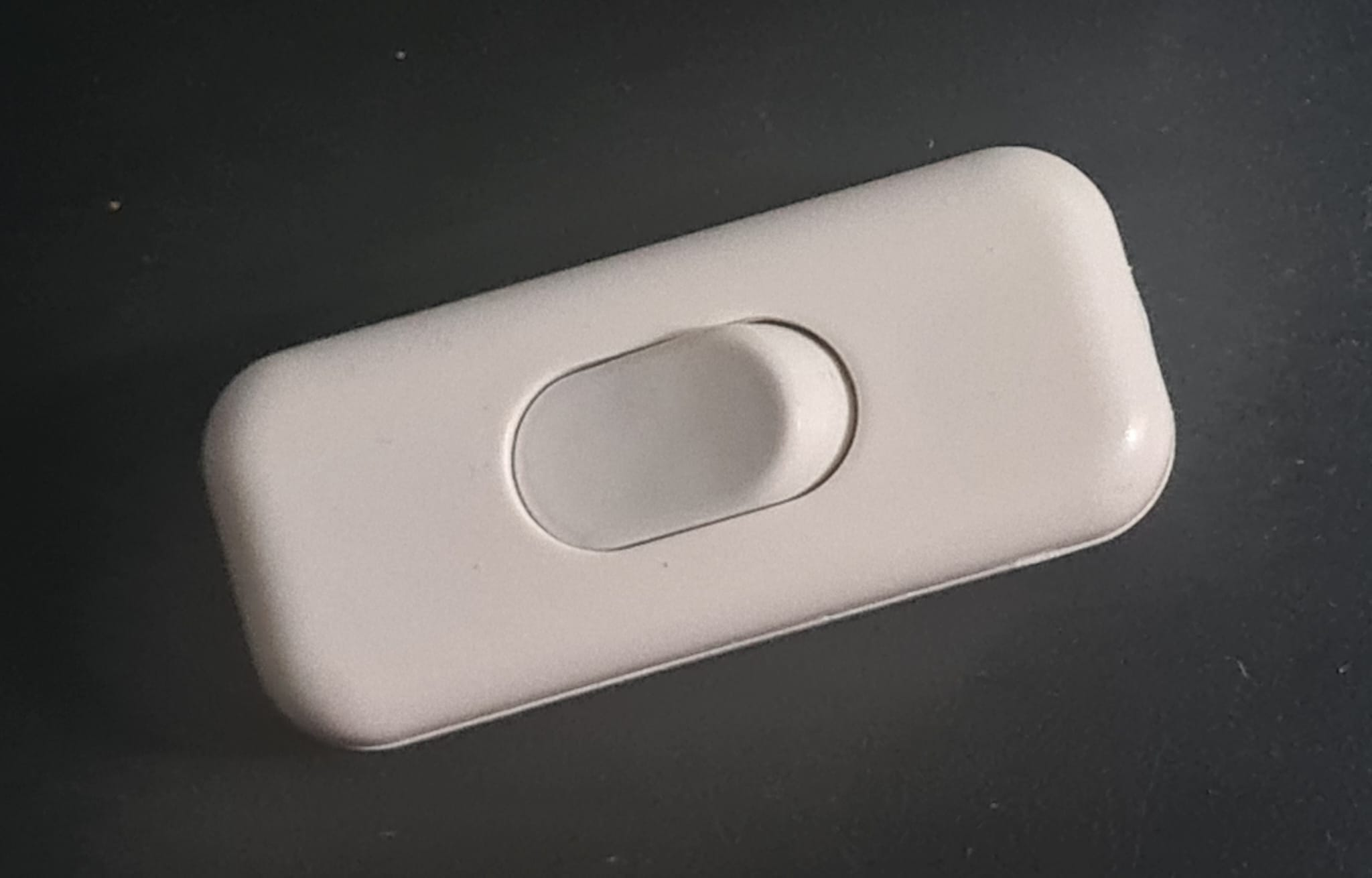
Pear push button

There are two kinds:

- Switch/commutator: similar to a push button but it is a model that is bistable and returns the switch to its default position after pressing twice, changes the initial condition of the circuit or restores it and keeps the circuit electrically connected to maintain the electrical state current. In all cases, pressing the button again returns it to its initial position. (Examples: bed head switches, bedside lamp switches, photographic enlarger switches)
- Pushbutton - is a momentary or latching switch that causes a temporary change in the state of an electrical circuit only while the switch is physically actuated . It allows electricity to flow between its two contacts when held. When the button is released, the circuit opens. This type of switch is also known as a normally open (NO) switch. Examples: bell at the head of the bed in old houses.

== Bibliography ==
- Pense-Lheritier, A.M.; Bacle, I.; Delarue, J. (2021). Nonfood Sensory Practices. Woodhead Publishing Series in Food Science, Technology and Nutrition. Elsevier Science. ISBN 978-0-12-821968-3.
