= Photographic processing =

Chemical process that transforms a latent image into a visible image

Photographic processing or photographic development is the chemical means by which photographic film or photographic paper is treated after photographic exposure to produce a negative or positive image. Photographic processing transforms the latent image into a visible image, makes this permanent and renders it insensitive to light.

All processes based upon the gelatin silver process are similar, regardless of the film or paper's manufacturer. Exceptional variations include instant films such as those made by Polaroid and thermally developed films. Kodachrome required Kodak's proprietary K-14 process. Kodachrome film production ceased in 2009, and K-14 processing is no longer available as of December 30, 2010. Ilfochrome materials use the dye destruction process. Deliberately using the wrong process for a film is known as cross processing.

== Common processes ==
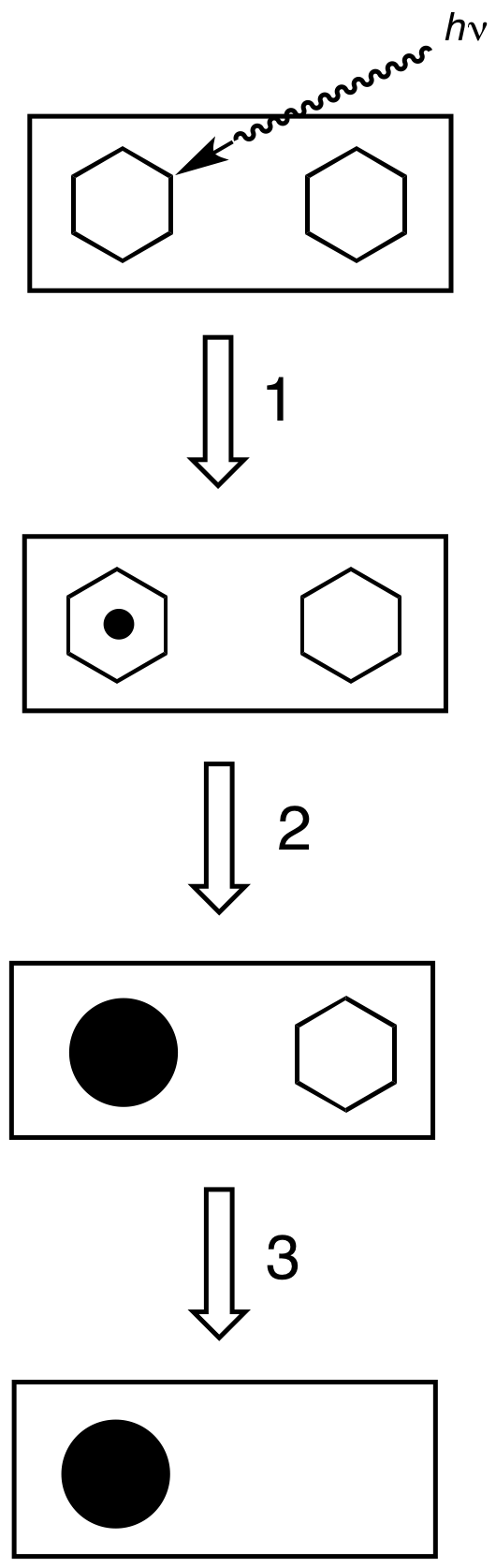
Key stages in production of Ag-based photographs. Two silver halide particles, one of which is impinged with light (hν) resulting in the formation of a latent image (step 1). The latent image is amplified using photographic developers, converting the silver halide crystal to an opaque particle of silver metal (step 2). Finally, the remaining silver halide is removed by fixing (step 3).

All photographic processing use a series of chemical baths. Processing, especially the development stages, requires very close control of temperature, agitation and time.

=== Black and white negative processing ===
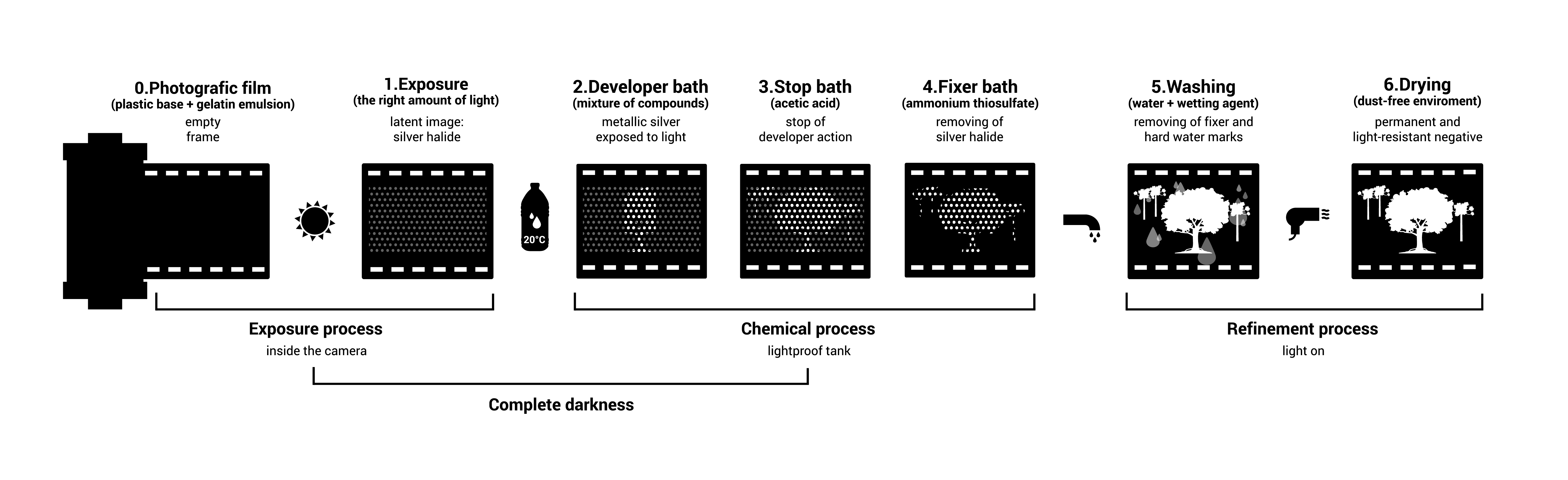
Black and white negative processing is the chemical means by which photographic film and paper is treated after photographic exposure to produce a negative or positive image. Photographic processing transforms the latent image into a visible image, makes this permanent and renders it insensitive to light.

1. The film may be soaked in water to swell the gelatin layer, facilitating the action of the subsequent chemical treatments.
2. The developer converts the latent image to macroscopic particles of metallic silver.
3. A stop bath, (Note: In modern automatic processing machines, the stop bath is replaced by mechanical squeegee or pinching rollers. These treatments remove much of the carried-over alkaline developer, and the acid, when used, neutralizes the alkalinity to reduce the contamination of the fixing bath with the developer.) typically a dilute solution of acetic acid or citric acid, halts the action of the developer. A rinse with clean water may be substituted.
4. The fixer makes the image permanent and light-resistant by dissolving remaining silver halide. A traditional fixer is hypo (sodium thiosulfate); modern rapid fixers use ammonium thiosulfate instead.
5. Washing in clean water removes any remaining fixer. Residual fixer can corrode the silver image, leading to discolouration, staining and fading.

The washing time can be reduced and the fixer more completely removed if a hypo clearing agent is used after the fixer.

1. Film may be rinsed in a dilute solution of a non-ionic wetting agent to assist uniform drying, which eliminates drying marks caused by hard water. (In very hard water areas, a pre-rinse in distilled water may be required – otherwise the final rinse wetting agent can cause residual ionic calcium on the film to drop out of solution, causing spotting on the negative.)
2. Film is then dried in a dust-free environment, cut and placed into protective sleeves.

Once the film is processed, it is then referred to as a negative.

The negative may now be printed; the negative is placed in an enlarger and projected onto a sheet of photographic paper. Many different techniques can be used during the enlargement process. Two examples of enlargement techniques are dodging and burning.

Alternatively (or as well), the negative may be scanned for digital printing or web viewing after adjustment, retouching, and/or manipulation.

From a chemical standpoint, conventional black and white negative film is processed by a developer that reduces silver halide to silver metal, exposed silver halide is reduced faster than unexposed silver halide, which leaves a silver metal image. It is then fixed by converting all remaining silver halide into a soluble silver complex, which is then washed away with water. An example of a black and white developer is Kodak D-76 which has bis(4-hydroxy-N-methylanilinium) sulfate with hydroquinone and sodium sulfite.

In graphic art film, also called lithographic film which is a special type of black and white film used for converting images into halftone images for offset printing, a developer containing methol-hydroquinone and sulfite stabilizers may be used. Exposed silver halide oxidizes the hydroquinone, which then oxidizes a nucleating agent in the film, which is attacked by a hydroxide ion and converts it via hydrolysis into a nucleating agent for silver metal, which it then forms on unexposed silver halide, creating a silver image. The film is then fixed by converting all remaining silver halide into soluble silver complexes.

=== Black and white reversal processing ===
This process has three additional stages:

1. Following the first developer and rinse, the film is bleached to remove the developed negative image. This negative image is composed of metallic silver formed in the first developer step. The bleach used here only affects the negative, metallic silver grains, it does not affect the unexposed and therefore undeveloped silver halide. The film then contains a latent positive image formed from unexposed and undeveloped silver halide salts.
2. The film is fogged, either chemically or by exposure to light.
3. The remaining silver halide salts are developed in the second developer, converting them into a positive image composed of metallic silver.
4. Finally, the film is fixed, washed, dried and cut.

=== Colour processing ===
Chromogenic materials use dye couplers to form colour images. Modern colour negative film is developed with the C-41 process and colour negative print materials with the RA-4 process. These processes are very similar, with differences in the first chemical developer.

The C-41 and RA-4 processes consist of the following steps:

1. The colour developer develops the silver negative image by reducing the silver halide crystals that have been exposed to light to metallic silver, this consists of the developer donating electrons to the silver halide, turning it into metallic silver; the donation oxidizes the developer, which then reacts with the dye couplers to form the colour dyes in each emulsion layer, but only near the exposed silver halide that is being developed.
2. A rehalogenising bleach converts the developed metallic silver into silver halide.
3. A fixer removes all silver halide by converting it into soluble silver complexes that are then washed away, leaving only the dyes.
4. The film is washed, stabilised, dried and cut.

In the RA-4 process, the bleach and fix are combined in a single bleach-fix bath; in Kodak's process for roller-transport processors, development and bleach-fixing each take 45 seconds, followed by a 90-second wash, for which a stabilizer may be substituted.

Transparency films, except Kodachrome, are developed using the E-6 process, which has the following stages:

1. A black and white developer develops the silver in each image layer.
2. Development is stopped with a rinse or a stop bath.
3. The film is fogged in the reversal step.
4. The fogged silver halides are developed and oxidized developing agents couple with the dye couplers in each layer.
5. The film is bleached, fixed, washed/rinsed, stabilised and dried as described above.

The Kodachrome process is called K-14. It is very involved, requiring 4 separate developers, one for black and white and 3 for color, reexposing the film in between development stages, 8 or more tanks of processing chemicals, each with precise concentration, temperature and agitation, resulting in very complex processing equipment with precise chemical control.

In some old processes, the film emulsion was hardened during the process, typically before the bleach. Such a hardening bath often used aldehydes, such as formaldehyde and glutaraldehyde. In modern processing, these hardening steps are unnecessary because the film emulsion is sufficiently hardened to withstand the processing chemicals.

A typical chromogenic color film development process can be described from a chemical standpoint as follows: Exposed silver halide oxidizes the developer. The oxidized developer then reacts with color couplers, which are molecules near the exposed silver halide crystals, to create color dyes which ultimately create a negative image, after this the film is bleached, fixed, washed, stabilized and dried. The dye is only created where the couplers are. Thus the development chemical must travel a short distance from the exposed silver halide to the coupler and create a dye there. The amount of dye created is small and the reaction only occurs near the exposed silver halide and thus doesn't spread throughout the entire layer. The developer diffuses into the film emulsion to react with its layers. This process happens simultaneously for all three colors of couplers in the film: cyan (in the red-sensitive layer in the film), magenta(for the green-sensitive layer), and yellow (for the blue-sensitive layer). Color film has these three layers, to be able to perform subtractive color mixing and be able to replicate colors in images.

== Further processing ==
Black and white emulsions both negative and positive, may be further processed. The image silver may be reacted with elements such as selenium or sulphur to increase image permanence and for aesthetic reasons. This process is known as toning.

In selenium toning, the image silver is changed to silver selenide; in sepia toning, the image is converted to silver sulphide. These chemicals are more resistant to atmospheric oxidising agents than silver.

If colour negative film is processed in conventional black and white developer, and fixed and then bleached with a bath containing hydrochloric acid and potassium dichromate solution, the resultant film, once exposed to light, can be redeveloped in colour developer to produce an unusual pastel colour effect.

== Processing apparatus ==
Before processing, the film must be removed from the camera and from its cassette, spool or holder in a light-proof room or container.

=== Small scale processing ===
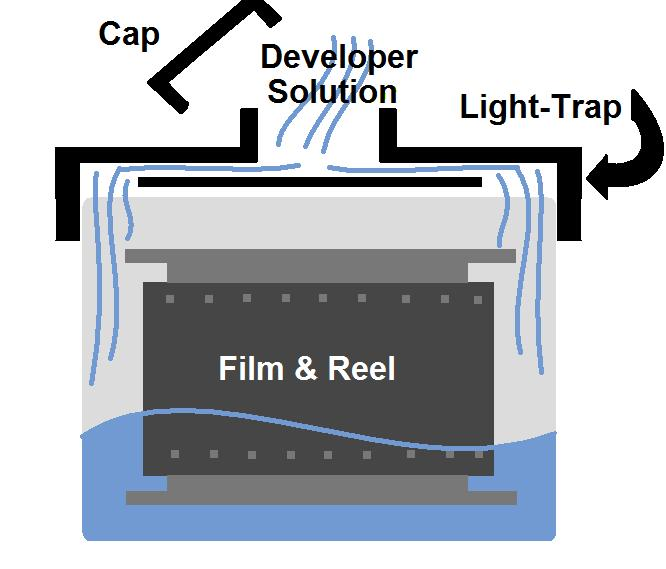
A cut-away illustration of a typical light-trap tank used in small scale developing

In amateur processing, the film is removed from the camera and wound onto a reel in complete darkness (usually inside a darkroom with the safelight turned off or a lightproof bag with arm holes). The reel holds the film in a spiral shape, with space between each successive loop so the chemicals may flow freely across the film's surfaces. The reel is placed in a specially designed light-proof tank (called a daylight processing tank or a light-trap tank) where it is retained until final washing is complete.

Sheet films can be processed in trays, in hangers (which are used in deep tanks), or rotary processing drums. Each sheet can be developed individually for special requirements. Stand development, long development in dilute developer without agitation, is occasionally used.

=== Commercial processing ===
In commercial, central processing, the film is removed automatically or by an operator handling the film in a light proof bag from which it is fed into the processing machine. The processing machinery is generally run on a continuous basis with films spliced together in a continuous line. All the processing steps are carried out within a single processing machine with automatically controlled time, temperature and solution replenishment rate. The film or prints emerge washed and dry and ready to be cut by hand. Some modern machines also cut films and prints automatically, sometimes resulting in negatives cut across the middle of the frame where the space between frames is very thin or the frame edge is indistinct, as in an image taken in low light. Alternatively stores may use minilabs to develop films and make prints on the spot automatically without needing to send film to a remote, central facility for processing and printing.

Some processing chemistries used in minilabs require a minimum amount of processing per given amount of time to remain stable and usable. Once rendered unstable due to low use, the chemistry needs to be completely replaced, or replenishers can be added to restore the chemistry to a usable state. Some chemistries have been designed with this in mind given the declining demand for film processing in minilabs, often requiring specific handling. Often chemistries become damaged by oxidation. Also, development chemicals need to be thoroughly agitated constantly to ensure consistent results. The effectiveness (activity) of the chemistry is determined through pre-exposed film control strips.

== Environmental and safety issues ==
Many photographic solutions have high chemical and biological oxygen demand (COD and BOD). These chemical wastes are often treated with ozone, peroxide or aeration to reduce the COD in commercial laboratories.

Exhausted fixer and to some extent rinse water contain silver thiosulfate complex ions. They are far less toxic than free silver ions, and they become silver sulfide sludge in the sewer pipes or treatment plant. However, the maximum silver concentration in discharge is very often tightly regulated. Silver is also a somewhat precious resource. Therefore, in most large scale processing establishments, exhausted fixer is collected for silver recovery and disposal.

Many photographic chemicals use non-biodegradable compounds, such as EDTA, DTPA, NTA and borate. EDTA, DTPA, and NTA are very often used as chelating agents in all processing solutions, particularly in developers and washing aid solutions. EDTA and other polyamine polycarboxylic acids are used as iron ligands in colour bleach solutions. These are relatively nontoxic, and in particular EDTA is approved as a food additive. However, due to poor biodegradability, these chelating agents are found in alarmingly high concentrations in some water sources from which municipal tap water is taken. Water containing these chelating agents can leach metal from water treatment equipment as well as pipes. This is becoming an issue in Europe and some parts of the world.

Another non-biodegradable compound in common use is surfactant. A common wetting agent for even drying of processed film uses Union Carbide/Dow Triton X-100 or octylphenol ethoxylate. This surfactant is also found to have estrogenic effect and possibly other harms to organisms including mammals.

Development of more biodegradable alternatives to the EDTA and other bleaching agent constituents were sought by major manufacturers, until the industry became less profitable when the digital era began.

In most amateur darkrooms, a popular bleach is potassium ferricyanide. This compound decomposes in the waste water stream to liberate cyanide gas. Other popular bleach solutions use potassium dichromate (a hexavalent chromium) or permanganate. Both ferricyanide and dichromate are tightly regulated for sewer disposal from commercial premises in some areas.

Borates, such as borax (sodium tetraborate), boric acid and sodium metaborate, are toxic to plants, even at a concentration of 100 ppm. Many film developers and fixers contain 1 to 20 g/L of these compounds at working strength. Most non-hardening fixers from major manufacturers are now borate-free, but many film developers still use borate as the buffering agent. Also, some, but not all, alkaline fixer formulae and products contain a large amount of borate. New products should phase out borates, because for most photographic purposes, except in acid hardening fixers, borates can be substituted with a suitable biodegradable compound.

Developing agents are commonly hydroxylated benzene compounds or aminated benzene compounds, and they are harmful to humans and experimental animals. Some are mutagens. They also have a large chemical oxygen demand (COD). Ascorbic acid and its isomers, and other similar sugar derived reductone reducing agents are a viable substitute for many developing agents. Developers using these compounds were actively patented in the US, Europe and Japan, until the 1990s but the number of such patents is very low since the late-1990s, when the digital era began.

Development chemicals may be recycled by up to 70% using an absorber resin, only requiring periodic chemical analysis on pH, density and bromide levels. Other developers need ion-exchange columns and chemical analysis, allowing for up to 80% of the developer to be reused. Some bleaches are claimed to be fully bio-degradable while others can be regenerated by adding bleach concentrate to overflow (waste). Used fixers can have 60 to 90% of their silver content removed through electrolysis, in a closed loop where the fixer is continually recycled (regenerated). Stabilizers may or may not contain formaldehyde.

== See also ==
- List of photographic processes
- Fogging (photography)
- Darkroom
- Cross processing
- Caffenol
