= Sun Ray Photo Company =

American photo company located in New York City

- Headquarters: Manhattan, New York, New York, United States

Sun Ray Photo Company was a 1940s and 1950s business which was located at 301 Lafayette Street The firm specialized in manufacturing low priced photographic enlargers.

== Product specifications ==
1940's Zenith 35 Photo Enlarger

1940's Zenith 35 Photo Enlarger

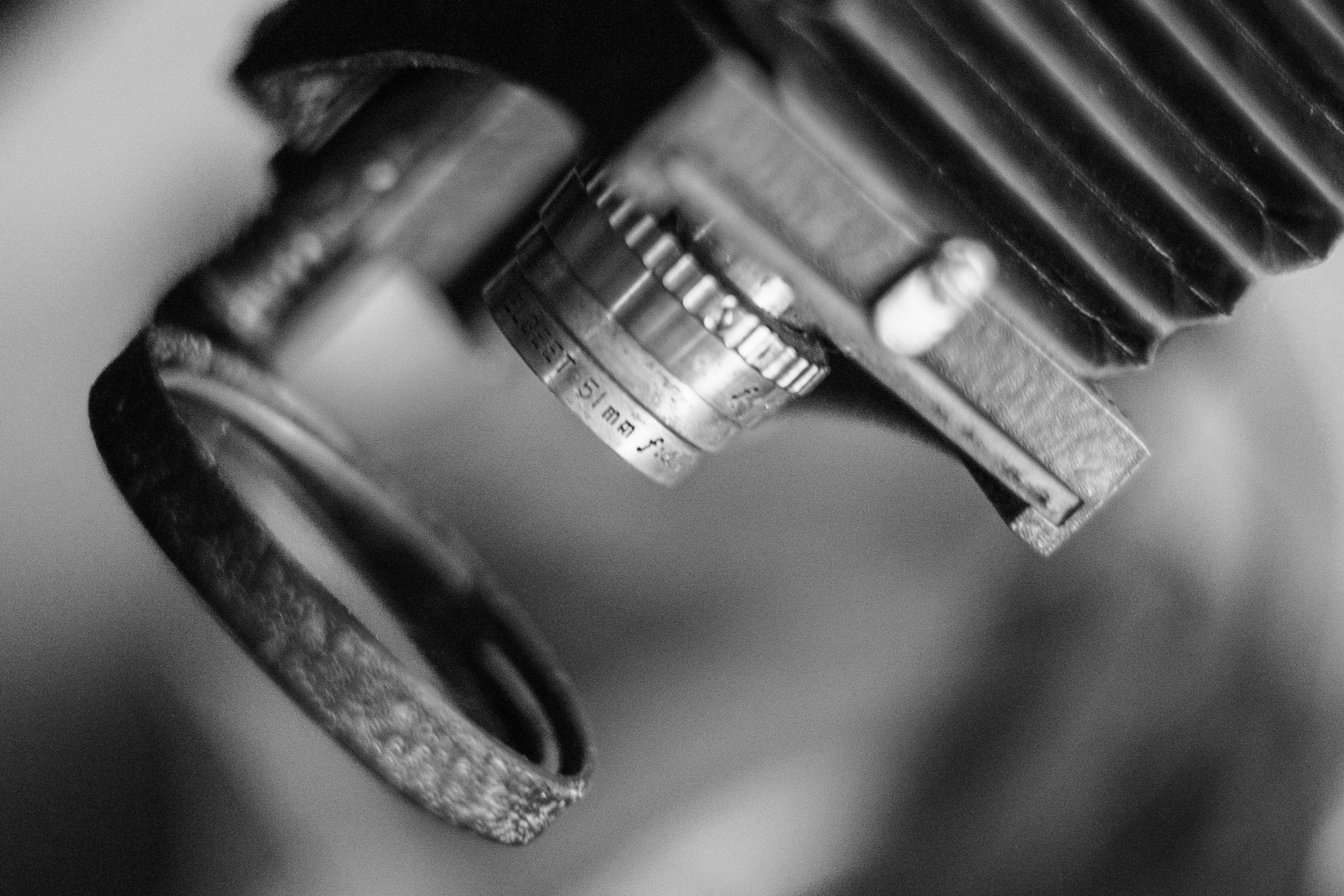
Elgeet Anastigmat 51mm 1:4 enlarging lens mounted on Zenith 35

Sun Ray Photo Company made photographers' equipment including camera tripods and at least five photo enlargers. The tripods were multi-sectional, fabricated in chrome-plated steel tubing and brass friction fittings. The photo enlargers, four of which employed a double condenser, are the Arnold D, Mastercraft 23, Zenith 35, and Mastercraft 43 models. The exception is the Aristocrat A, Sun Ray's initial entry, which is equipped with a diffusion head. The Aristocrat A is focused by means of a focusing tube. The other Sun Ray enlargers are focused through a bellows (photography). None of Sun Ray's enlargers are equipped with autofocus. All use a single post column. Aside from the corporation's final enlarger, the Mastercraft 43, each has a 2.25 × 3.25-inch format. Mastercraft 43 has a 4 × 5-inch format. The Arnold D enlarger model features a faster standard lens than any of the others. The Zenith 35, initially designed as part of a field portable darkroom kit for the military, was the sole model to have survived the Sun Ray Photo Company itself, and continued in production by the TestRite Instruments Company of NJ under their Fotolarger brand well into the 1960s.
