= Callier effect =

The Callier effect is the variation in contrast of images produced by a photographic film with different manners of illumination. It should not be confused with the variation in sharpness which also is due differences partial coherence.

The directed bright-field (see Fig. 1) has extremely strong directional characteristics by means of a point source and an optical system (condenser); in this case, each point of the photographic film receives light from only one direction.

Figure 1. Directed bright-field

On the other hand, in a diffused bright-field setup (see Fig. 2) the illumination of the film is provided through a translucent slab (diffuser), and each point of the film receives light from a wide range of directions.

Figure 2. Diffused-bright-field

The collimation of the illumination plays a fundamental role in contrast of the image impressed on a film.

In case of high scattering fraction, the attenuance provided by the image particles changes considerably with the degree of collimation of the illumination. In Figure 3 the same silver-based film is reproduced in directed and diffused bright-field setups. The global contrast also changes: the contrast on the left is much stronger than that on the right.

Figure 3. Images of the same silver-based film acquired in directed and diffused bright-field setups

In the absence of scattering, the attenuance provided by the emulsion is independent of the collimation of the illumination; a dense point absorbs a big portion of light and a less dense point absorbs a smaller portion, irrespective of the directional characteristics of the incident light. In Figure 4 are reported the images of a dye-based film acquired in directed and diffused bright-field setups; the global contrast of the two images is about the same.

Figure 4. Images of the same dye-based film acquired in directed and diffused bright-field setups

The ratio between the attenuances provided by a specific point of a photographic film, which was measured in directed (D_{dir}) and diffused (D_{dif}) bright-fields, is termed the Callier Q factor:

$$Q=\frac{D_\text{dir}}{D_\text{dif}}$$

The Callier Q factor is always equal to or greater than unity; its trend versus the diffusely measured density D_{dif} is depicted in Figure 5 for a typical silver-based film.

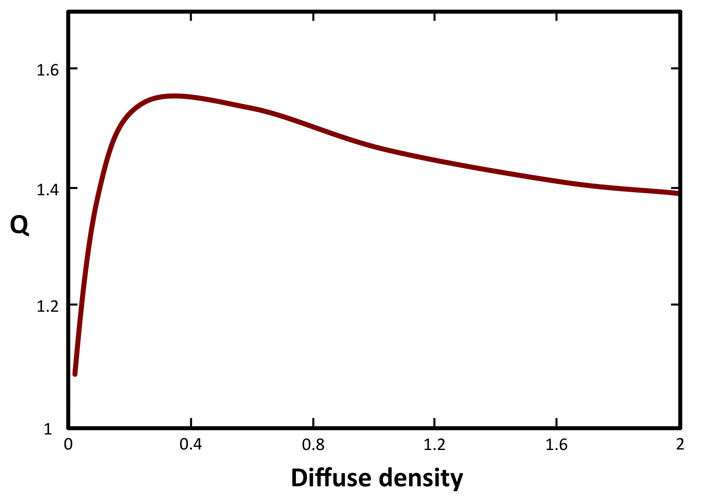
Figure 5: Callier Q factorversus diffuse density for a silver-based film.

These variations (for example with a condenser or a diffuser enlarger) were observed over a long period of time, and they became known as ‘Callier effect’.

The correct optical explanation of the Callier effect had to wait until the 1978 papers of Chavel and Loewenthal.
