= RA-4 process =

Chemical process used to make photo prints

RA-4 is Kodak's proprietary name for the chemical process most commonly used to make color photographic prints. It is used for both minilab wet silver halide digital printers common today in photo labs, and for prints made with older-type optical enlargers and manual processing.

More specifically, common color photographic paper is carefully exposed to form a latent image of the picture, and then the paper is run through the series of chemicals that together comprise the RA-4 process to convert the latent image into the final print. RA-4 uses Color Developing Agent 3, in combination with color couplers in the emulsion to generate color dyes.

RA-4 is a standardized chromogenic process used worldwide to make prints with a variety of equipment, photographic paper, and chemicals. Kodak created the RA-4 process for its color negative photographic papers. Fuji, Agfa, and other present and past photographic supply companies also make or have made both papers that are compatible with the Kodak chemicals, and chemicals that are compatible with the Kodak papers. These other companies typically call their equivalent processes by other names, but to most photographers, RA-4 is used as a generic term.

The actual chemical process occurs at 100 degrees F. The steps: 1. The paper (glossy or matte) is taken through color developer; 2. Bleach/fixer bath; 3. Stabilizer bath which both stabilizes the paper and washes out the chemicals; 4. Drying. Since the paper is Resin Coated, it dries flat and even.

This processing can be done in a machine, e.g. in a minilab, where rotary tubes transport the film through the baths, or by the photo hobbyist in a darkroom setting, using trays for each bath.

Current manufacturers of RA-4 Chemistry include Kodak, Freestyle, Rollei, Unicolor and Tetenal as of 2017.

The result of RA-4 processing is a Type C, or chromogenic print.
