= Intrepid Camera =

Intrepid Camera is a British manufacturer of large format cameras and darkroom equipment.

Their cameras are noted for being inexpensive and lightweight compared to large format cameras from other manufacturers.

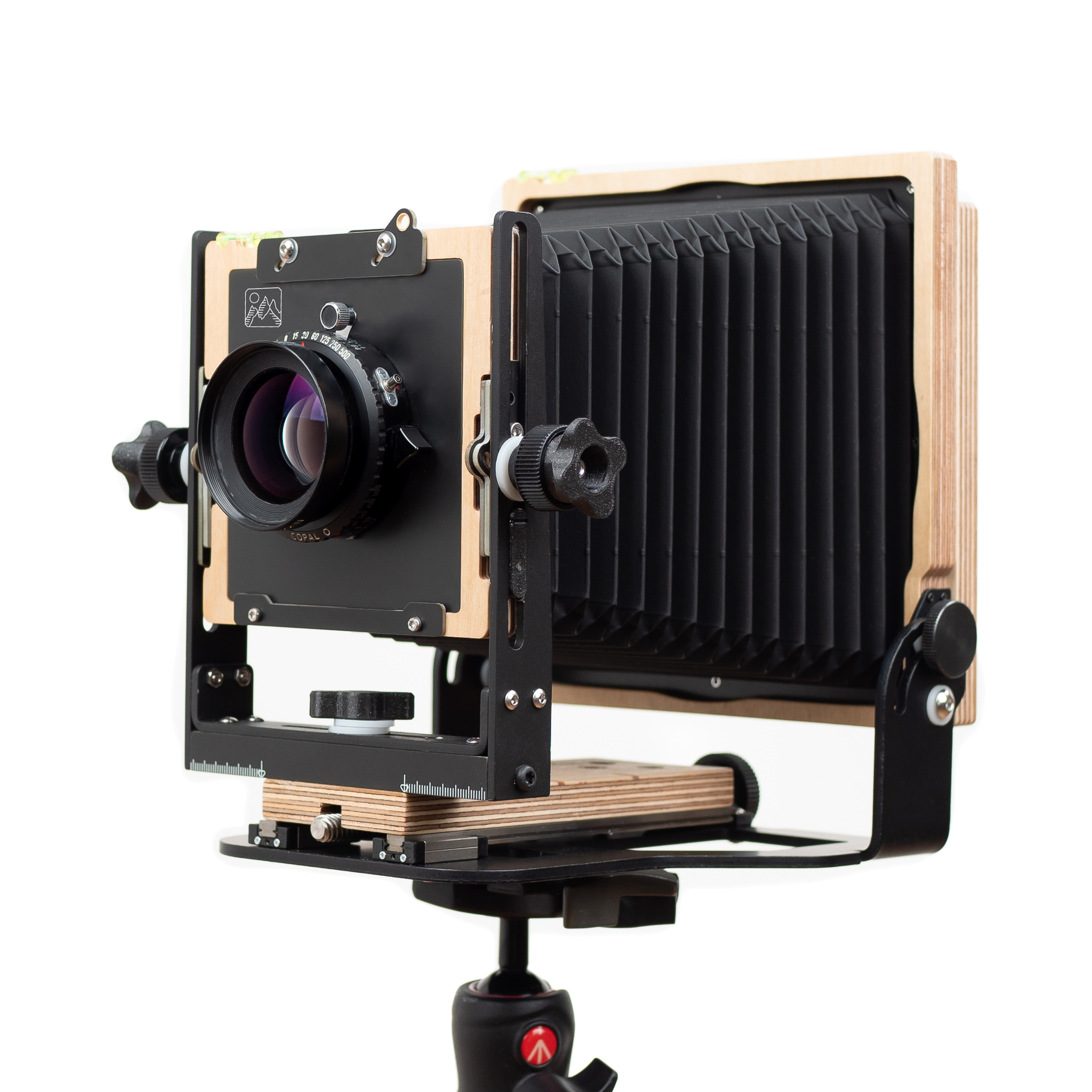
Intrepid 4x5 MK5 Camera with black bellows

== History ==
Intrepid was founded in 2014 in Brighton UK by University of Sussex product design student Maxim Grew through a successful Kickstarter campaign. Following the successful launch of a 4×5 format camera, the company has since expanded to produce cameras in 5×7 and 8×10 formats, as well as enlargers.

== Products ==
=== Cameras ===
- Intrepid 4×5 (2015)
  - MK2 (2017)
  - MK3 (2018)
  - MK4 (2019)
  - Black Edition (2021)
  - MK5 (2022)
- Intrepid 5×7 (2020)
- Intrepid 8×10
  - MK2 (2019)
  - MK3 (2022)
  - Black Edition (2023)

=== Enlargers ===
- Intrepid 4×5 Enlarger
- Intrepid Compact 35mm / 120 Enlarger
- Intrepid De Vere 504 Converter
