= Spotting (photography) =

In the production of photographic prints, spotting is a type of retouching flaws in the finished print with specially made paints, dyes, pencils and pens.

White spots on gelatin-silver prints made from negatives are caused by dust adhering to the negative or paper during exposure. Prints from positive transparencies exhibit black spots.

White spots can be carefully darkened using a fine paintbrush and a dye of the appropriate colour. A small amount of dye, which should be very weak, is needed. The spot will darken as dye accumulates in the gelatin layer.

Black spots on gelatin-silver prints are caused by holes in the negative's emulsion. These can be removed by careful knifing of the gelatin layer.

For spotting work, always use a magnifying glass and a good light source.

== See also ==
- Photo manipulation
- Photographic printing
