= Dodging and burning =

Photography terminology

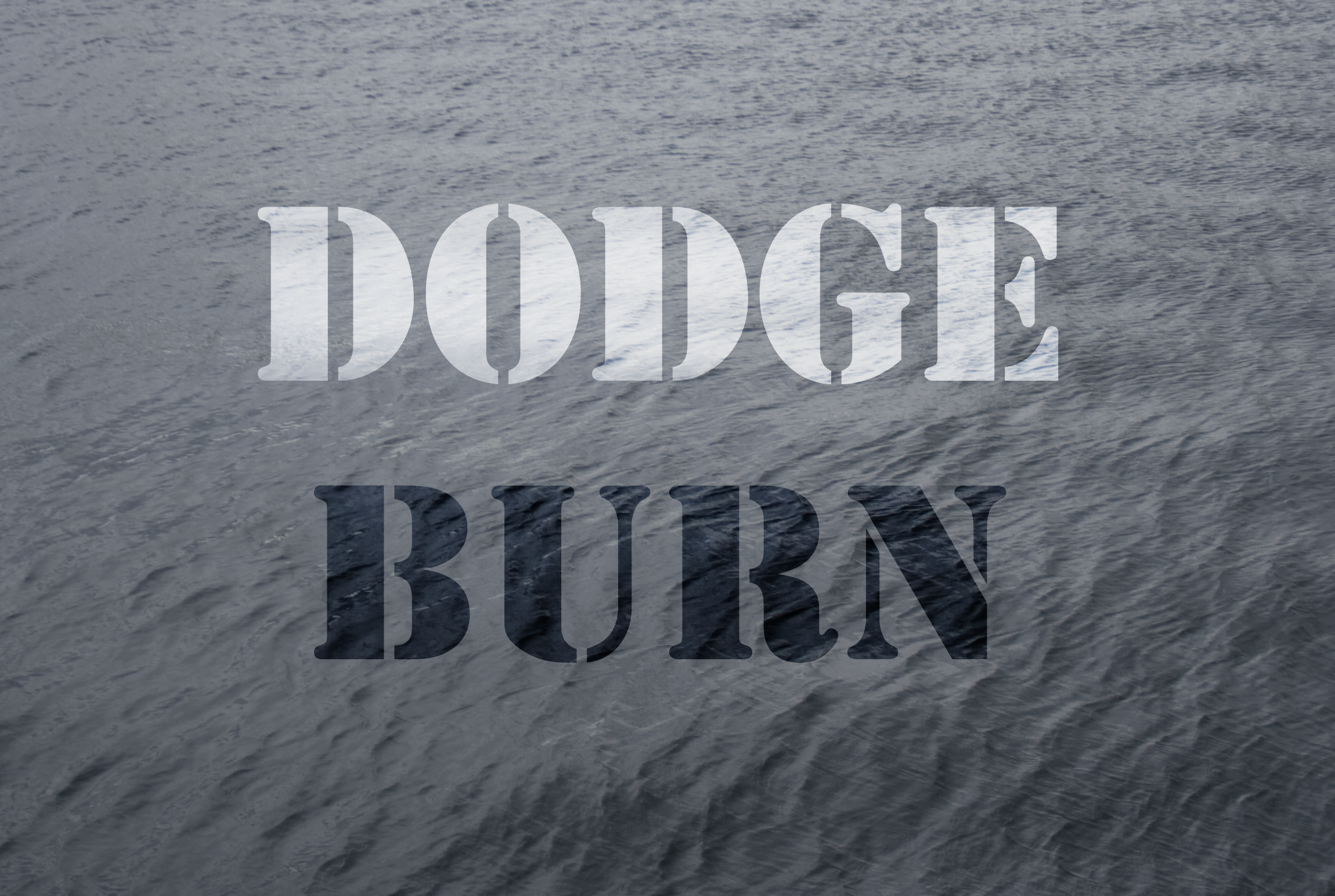
An example of dodge & burn effects applied to a digital photograph

Dodging and burning are techniques used during the printing process to manipulate the exposure of select areas on a photographic print, deviating from the rest of the image's exposure. In a darkroom print from a film negative, dodging decreases the exposure for areas of the print that the photographer wishes to be lighter, while burning increases the exposure to areas of the print that should be darker.

Any material with varying degrees of opacity may be used, as preferred, to cover or obscure the desired area for burning or dodging. One may use a transparency with text, designs, patterns, a stencil, or a completely opaque material shaped according to the desired area of burning/dodging.

Many modern digital image editing programs have "dodge" and "burn" tools that mimic the effect on digital images.

== Applications ==
A key application of dodging and burning is to improve contrast (tonal reproduction) in film print-making; today this is better known as tone mapping in digital photography – see high-dynamic-range imaging. The technical issue is that natural scenes have higher dynamic range (ratio of light to dark) than can be captured by film, which in turn is greater than can be reproduced in prints. Compressing this high dynamic range into a print either requires uniformly decreasing contrast (making tones closer together) or carefully printing different parts of an image differently so that each retains the maximum contrast – in this latter dodging and burning is a key tool.

An excellent example is the photograph Schweitzer with lamp at his desk by W. Eugene Smith, from his 1954 photo essay A Man of Mercy on Dr. Albert Schweitzer and his humanitarian work in French Equatorial Africa. The image took 5 days to produce, in order to reproduce the tonal range of the scene, which ranges from a bright lamp (relative to the scene) to dark shadow.

Ansel Adams elevated dodging and burning to an art form. Many of his famous prints were manipulated in the darkroom with these two techniques. Adams wrote a comprehensive book on producing prints called The Print, which features dodging and burning prominently, in the context of his Zone System.

They can also be used in less subtle ways, as in the stenciled lettering shown at the top of this article.

== Technique ==
By using completely opaque material as a cover over the preferred area for dodging or burning, absolutely no light will pass through and as a result, an outline of the material may be visible on the print. One way to prevent obvious cover-up lines is to slightly shake the burning material over the covered area while it is being exposed. Another way to prevent obvious cover-up lines is to use slightly less opaque material closer to the outline to produce a more subtle, faded effect.

=== Burning ===
Burning: a darkroom technique

To burn-in a print, the print is first given normal exposure. Next, extra exposure is given to the area or areas that need to be darkened. A card or other opaque object is held between the enlarger lens and the photographic paper in such a way as to allow light to fall only on the portion of the scene to be darkened.

=== Dodging ===
Dodging: also a darkroom technique

A card or other opaque object is held between the enlarger lens and the photographic paper in such a way as to block light from the portion of the scene to be lightened. Since the technique is used with a negative-to-positive process, reducing the amount of light results in a lighter image.

== See also ==
- Blend modes
- Darkroom
- Vignetting

== References and sources ==
Sources

- Adams, Ansel (June 1, 1995), The Print, p. 210, ISBN 978-0-8212-2187-7
