= Dye destruction =

Photographic printing process

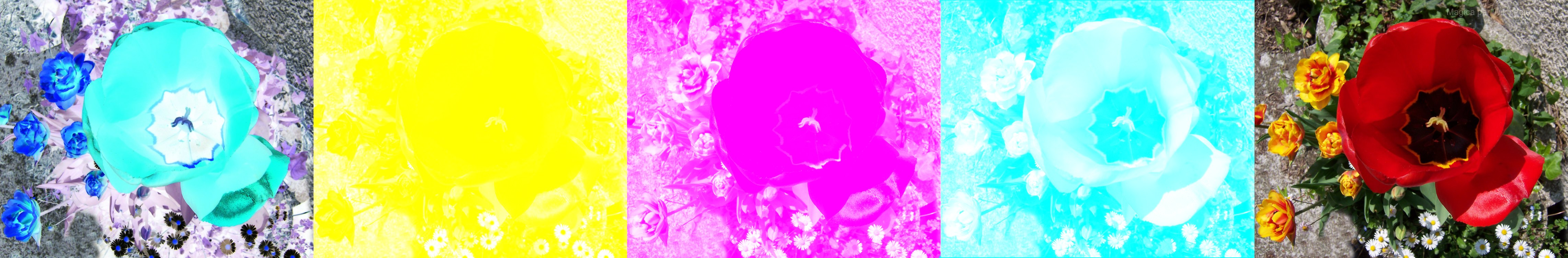
Example of a negative to positive print with dye-destroyed photographic material, 2007.

Dye destruction or dye bleach is a photographic printing process, in which dyes embedded in the paper are bleached (destroyed) in processing. Because the dyes are fully formed in the paper prior to processing, they may be formulated with few constraints, compared to the complex dye couplers that must react in chromogenic processing. This method has allowed the use of richly colored, highly stable dyes.

It is a reversal process, meaning that it is used in printing transparencies (diapositives).

Ilfochrome (originally Cibachrome) was the last widely available dye destruction process, and is known for its intense colors and archival qualities. It is no longer sold as of 2011, however Christopher Burkett is an artist who still uses Ilfochrome as his primary medium making use of stored papers and chemicals. Older dye destruction processes included Utocolor (early 1900s) and Gasparcolor (1930s). Plastic base supports have a "high gloss surface sheen".
