= Enlarger =

Specialized transparency projector

Scheme of a photographic enlarger

An enlarger is a specialized transparency projector used to produce photographic prints from film or glass negatives, or from transparencies.

== Construction ==
All enlargers consist of a light source, normally an incandescent light bulb shining though a condenser or translucent screen to provide even illumination, a holder for the negative or transparency, and a specialized lens for projection, though some, such as the Rapid Rectilinear could be used in both camera and enlarger. Enlarger lenses, like the dialyte construction, are generally symmetrical in design or nearly so, optimised for sharp focus at 2 × to 10 × magnification. The light passes through a film holder, which holds the exposed and developed photographic negative or transparency.

Prints made with an enlarger are called enlargements. Typically, enlargers are used in a darkroom, an enclosed space from which extraneous light may be excluded; some commercial enlargers have an integral dark box so that they can be used in a light-filled room.

== History ==
Staff at William Henry Fox Talbot's commercial calotype establishment in Reading, Berkshire, England. Salted paper print from a calotype paper negative, the left component of a panoramic pair of views, 1846.

Josef Maria Eder, in his History of Photography, attributes the invention of photographic enlargement to Humphry Davy who realised the idea of using a solar microscope to project images onto sensitised paper. In June 1802, Davy published in the first issue of the Journals of the Royal Institution of Great Britain his An Account of a Method of Copying Paintings upon Glass, and of Making Profiles, by the Agency of Light upon Nitrate of Silver. Invented by T. Wedgwood, Esq. With Observations by H. Davy in which he described their experiments with the photosensitivity of silver nitrate. Eder credits the first mention of enlargements after the announcement of the daguerreotype (unique images on metal plates) to John William Draper who in 1840, wrote prophetically in the American Repository of Arts: "Exposures are made with a very small camera on very small plates. These are subsequently enlarged to the required size in a larger camera on a rigid stand. This method will probably contribute very much to the practice of the art." In March 1843 Americans Wolcott and Johnson patented a means of copying and enlarging daguerreotypes.

In June 1843, Henry Fox Talbot in his patent for an enlarger for his calotype process which produced a paper negative, mentions that using lenses it is possible to produce a large negative from a smaller one, so having made such enlargements has a priority claim to be the inventor of a system for making an enlarged print from a negative, though it did not go into production and was not practical given the lengthy exposures required. In 1848, Talbot recommended to fellow photographer Thomas Malon the enlarging camera made by Thomas Ross of lens manufacturers Ross, Andrew & Thomas.

The advent of collodion negatives on glass in the 1850s made enlargement more practical. Achille Quinet's invention of 1852 used artificial light, but was inefficient, requiring extended exposures. David Acheson Woodward's 1857 'solar enlarging camera' addressed that problem by tapping the brightest light-source then available – the Sun – with mirrors and a condenser.

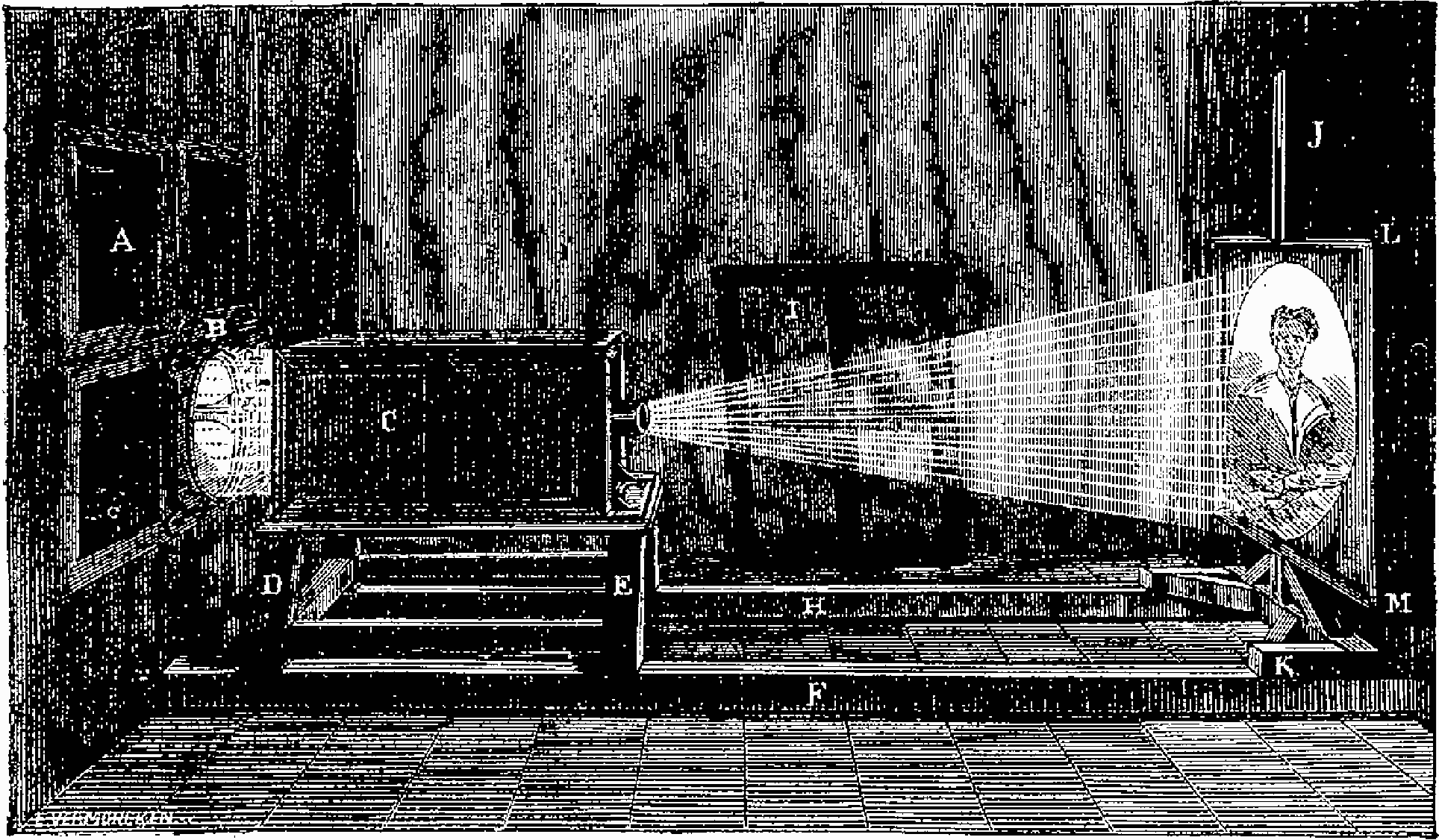
M. Monckhoven's 1864 solar enlarger (engraving)

=== Solar camera ===
Solar cameras, introduced in the late 1850s, and ancestors of the darkroom enlarger, were necessary because of the low light sensitivity of albumen and calotype materials used. A larger version of the 18th century solar microscope, they were first freestanding, a design analogous to picture-taking cameras but with the relative position of negative and lens reversed so that sunlight shone through the glass plate to be projected onto photo-sensitive paper inside the instrument. Mounted on a stand, they could be rotated to continuously face the sun.

Woodward's 1857 solar enlarging camera was a large instrument operated out-of-doors that could produce life-size prints from quarter plate and half plate negatives with an exposure of about forty-five minutes, improved in the 1860s and 1870s with a clockwork heliostat to rotate the mirror in synchronisation with the sun's passage to concentrate its light on the condenser lens, while Désiré van Monckhoven's 1863 patent was for a modification of Woodward's design that had an appearance more like a modern horizontal enlarger.

The instrument was used by significant photographers Disderi and Nadar. By 1890, artificial light sources – gas, petroleum, limelight, magnesium, and electric light bulb – were commonly used in enlargers, but even at the turn of the century, simple folding daylight enlargers still found a use among amateurs to easily produce prints of a fixed size. Some cameras were made convertible to use in a similar manner.

=== Commercial enlarging ===
In the 1870s hand-coloured enlargements from carte-de-visite prints and daguerreotypes as well as existing negatives were offered for sale in London, England for two shillings for an A4 print, and three pounds for a life size bust. R. L. Elliot & Company, of King's Road could print up to 25 in × 20 in from quarter plate negatives in 1878 using limelight, as suggested by John Benjamin Dancer.

Fast bromide and chloride printing papers largely superseded albumen emulsions in the 1880s.

== Types of enlarger ==
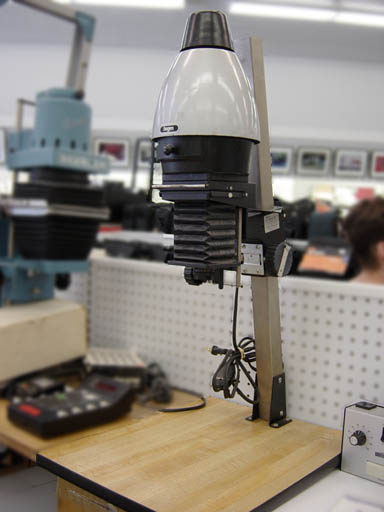
Photographic enlarger.

A condenser enlarger consists of a light source, a condensing lens, a holder for the negative and a projecting lens. The condenser provides even illumination to the negative beneath it. Condenser enlargers produce higher contrast than diffusion enlargers because light is scattered from its path by the negative's image silver; this is called the Callier effect. The condenser's increased contrast emphasises any negative defects, such as dirt and scratches, and image grain.

A point source enlarger is a variation of the condenser enlarger designed to cut light diffusion above the negative. Contrast is enhanced and grain in the resultant print is sharper than with a conventional enlarger, and the transition from light to dark at the edge of the shadow areas is dramatic.

An unfrosted clear lamp with a tiny filament is used without diffusers. As the illuminant is narrow, the lamp must be precisely positioned both vertically and horizontally, because the condensers project only that single small filament rather than light that fills the whole housing. However the lens must be kept at full aperture to avoid projecting an image of the light source restricted to the centre of the baseboard, which will cause vignetting and falloff in the print. Exposure is controlled through duration of illumination or by using a variable transformer.

A diffusion enlarger's light source is diffused by translucent glass or plastic, providing even illumination for the film. Diffusion enlargers produce an image of the same contrast as a contact print from the negative.

Cold light or cold cathode enlargers employ diffusion enlarger heads with a coiled Fluorescent lamp tube rather than a conventional light bulb. Their light is blue-rich, in an area of the spectrum to which silver gelatin paper is sensitive, and therefore exposure is shorter compared to other light sources, ideal for making large mural prints which require extended exposure, and heat is reduced which is beneficial in avoiding buckling or 'popping' of negatives, and also are Newton's rings where a glass negative carrier is used. They produce a softer (less contrast) print. Color enlargers typically contain an adjustable filter mechanism – the color head – between the light source and the negative, enabling the user to adjust the amount of cyan, magenta and yellow light reaching the negative to control color balance. Other models have a drawer where cut filters can be inserted into the light path, synthesize colour by additive mixing of light from colored lamps with adjustable intensity or duty cycle, or expose the receiving medium sequentially using red, green and blue light. Such enlargers can also be used with variable-contrast monochrome papers.

Digital enlargers project an image from an LCD screen at the film plane, to produce a photographic enlargement from a digital file.

== Enlarger physical arrangements ==
Most modern enlargers are vertically mounted with the lens pointing downward. Moving the head on the column up or down changes the size of the image projected onto the enlarger's base, or a work table if the unit is mounted to the wall.

A horizontal enlarger consists of a trestle, with the head mounted on crossbars between two or more posts for extra stability. A horizontal enlarger structure is used when high quality, large format enlargements are required such as when photographs are taken from aircraft for mapping and taxation purposes.

The parts of the enlarger include baseboard, enlarger head, elevation knob, filter holder, negative carrier, glass plate, focus knob, girder scale, timer, bellows, and housing lift.

== Principles of operation ==
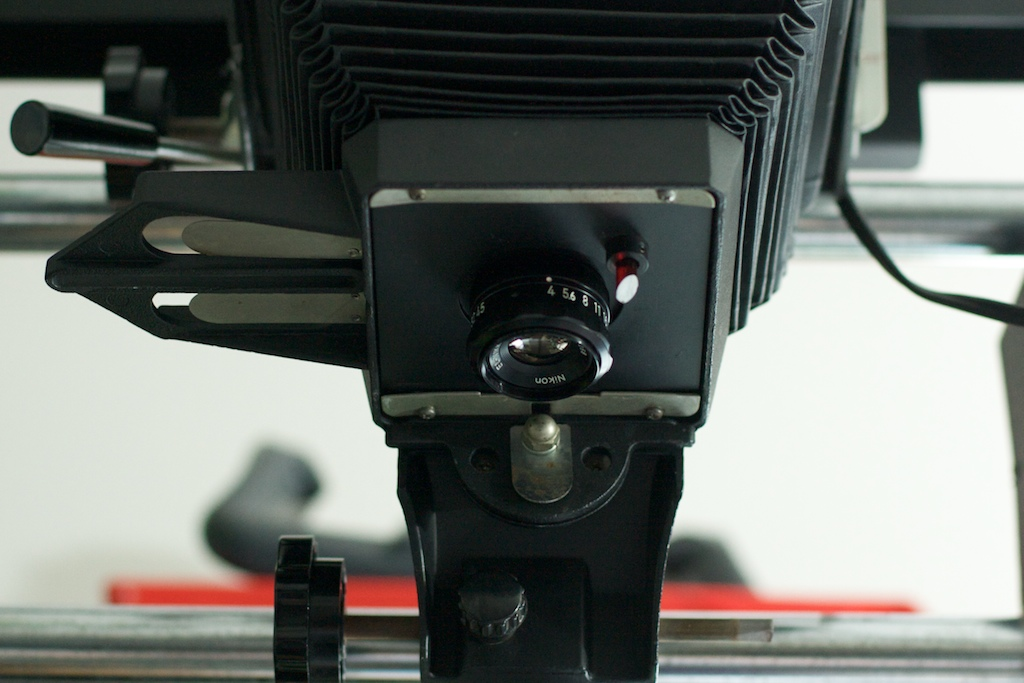
Enlarger lens: using the aperture ring, the photographer adjusts the iris diaphragm.

The image from the negative or transparency is projected through a lens, typically fitted with an adjustable aperture marked with f-stops, onto a flat surface bearing the sensitized photographic paper. By adjusting the ratio of distance from film to lens to the distance from lens to paper, various degrees of enlargement may be obtained, with the physical enlargement ratio limited only by the structure of the enlarger and the size of the paper. As the image size is changed it is also necessary to change the focus of the lens. Some enlargers, such as Leica's "Autofocus" enlargers, perform this automatically.

An easel is used to hold the paper perfectly flat. Some easels are designed with adjustable overlapping flat steel "blades" to crop the image on the paper to the desired size while keeping an unexposed white border about the image. Paper is sometimes placed directly on the table or enlarger base, and held down flat with metal strips.

The enlargement is made by first focusing the image with the lamp on, the lens at maximum aperture and the easel empty, usually with the aid of a focus finder. The lamp is turned off, or in some cases, shuttered by a light-tight mechanism.

The image is focused by changing the distance between the lens and the film, achieved by adjusting the length of a light-tight bellows with a geared rack and pinion mechanism.

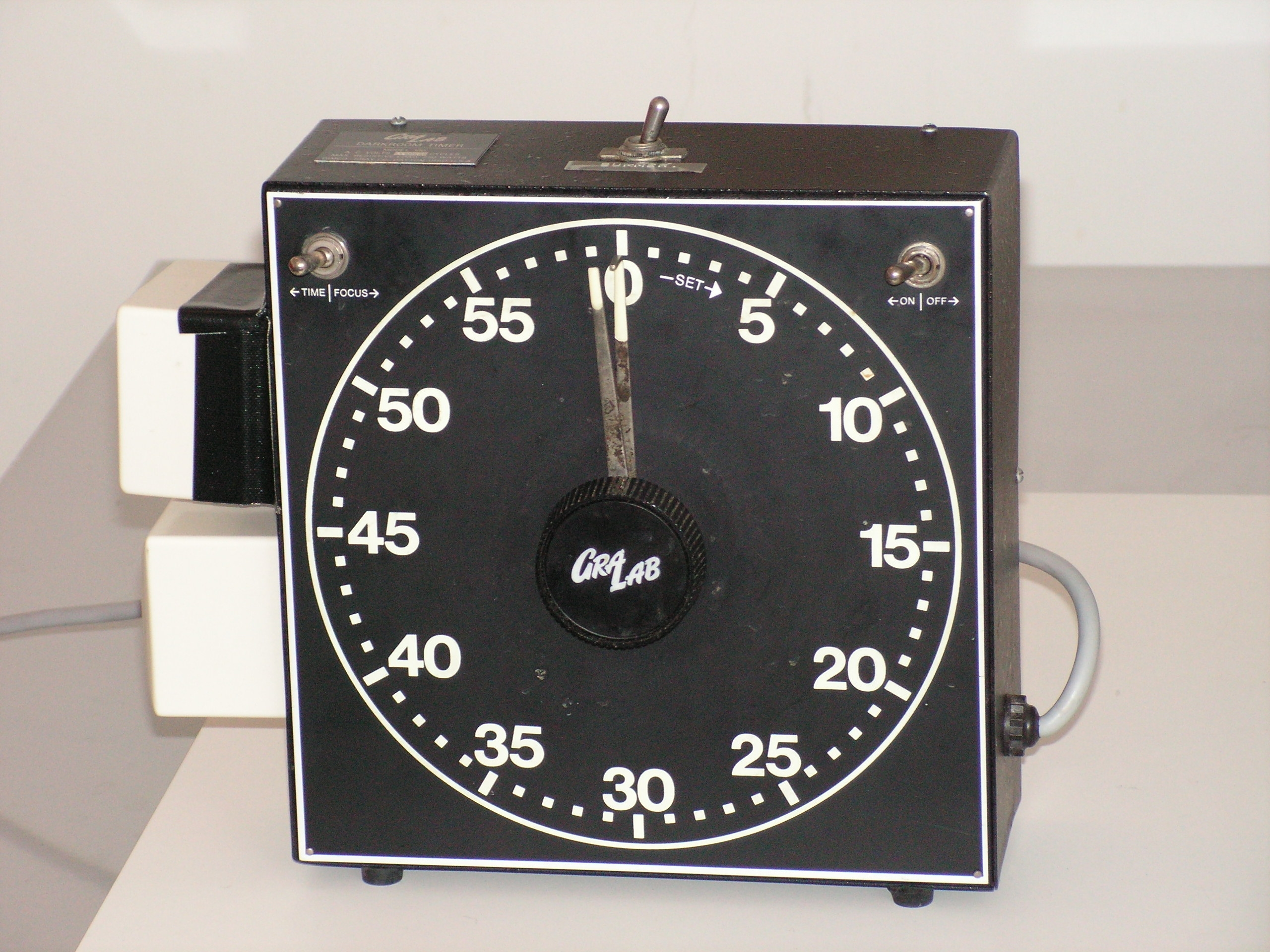
Electric timer: photographers choose exposure time.

The lens is set to its working aperture. Enlarging lenses have an optimum range of apertures which yield a sharp image from corner to corner, which is 3 f-stops smaller than the maximum aperture of the lens. For an enlarging lens with a maximum aperture of f/2.8, the optimal aperture would be f/8. The lens is normally set to this aperture and any color filtration dialed in, if making a color print or one on variable-contrast black-and-white paper.

A series of test strips, and/or a stepped series of exposures made on the one sheet of paper, are undertaken to determine ideal exposure, and then contrast or colour filtration. Alternatively a custom incident light meter (densitometer or 'colour-' or 'darkroom analyser') may be used in setting exposure once the degree of enlargement has been decided, and in colour printing may also be used to establish a base neutral filtration from the negative rebate.

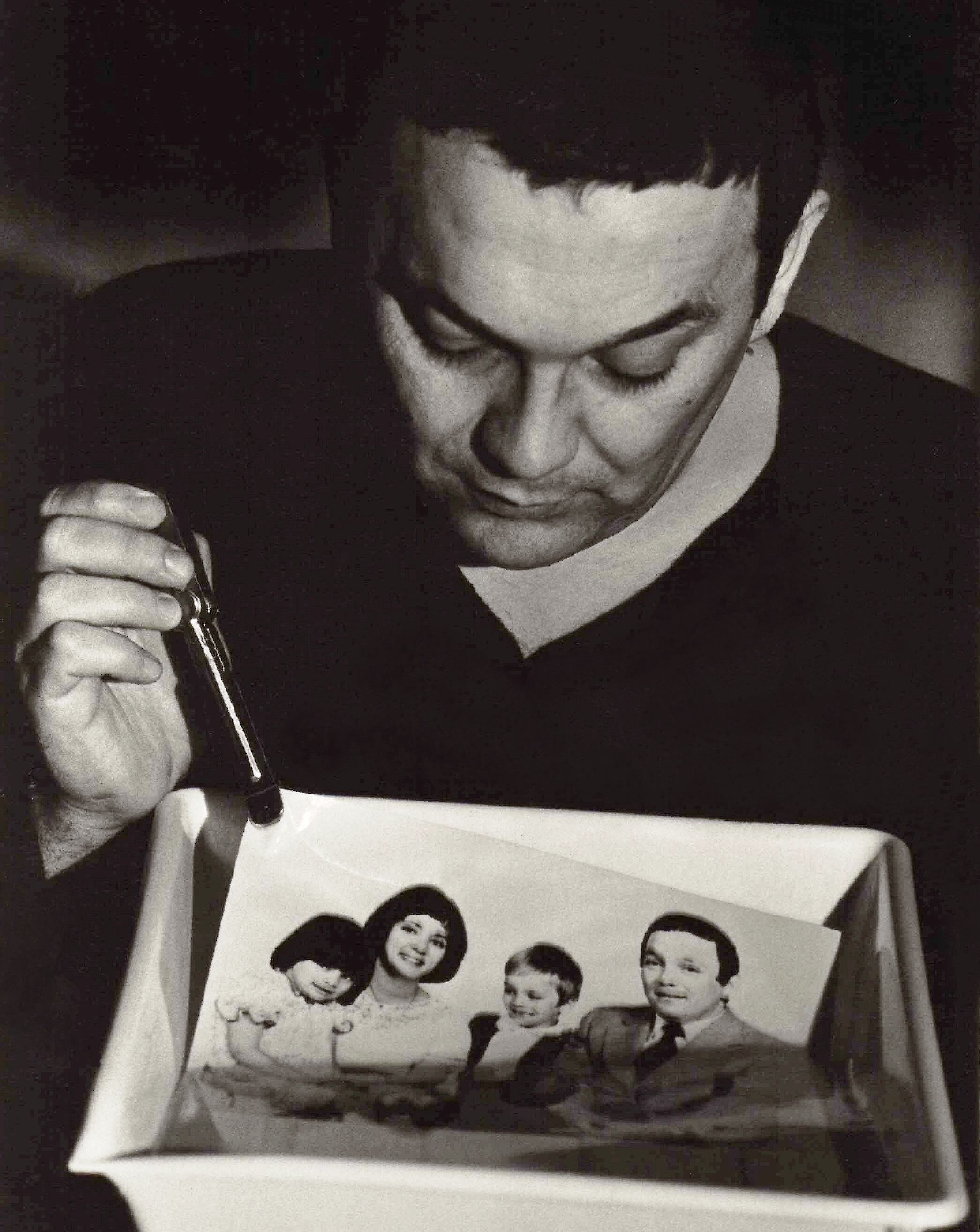
A black and white photographic print in a tray while being processed after exposure to light under a photographic enlarger. Typically three trays are used containing developer, stop bath and fixer, in that order. The print must then be washed in water to remove the fixer.

The enlarger's lamp or shutter mechanism is controlled either by an electronic timer, or by the operator – who marks time with a clock, metronome or simply by counting seconds – shuttering or turning off the lamp when the exposure is complete. The exposed paper can be processed immediately or placed in a light-tight container for later processing.

Digitally controlled commercial enlargers typically adjust exposure in steps known as printer points; twelve printer points makes a factor of two change in exposure.

If a greater or lesser enlargement from the same negative is then required, a calculator – analogue, digital or in app format – may be used to quickly extrapolate from the original settings the exposure without the need for labour-intensive re-testing.

== Paper processing ==
After exposure, photographic paper is developed, fixed, washed and dried using the gelatin silver or C-print process.

== Automated print machines ==
Automated photo print machines have the same basic elements and integrate each of the steps outlined above in a single complex machine under operator and computer control.

Rather than project directly from the film negative to the print paper, a digital image may first be captured from the negative. This allows the operator or computer to quickly determine adjustments to brightness, contrast, clipping, and other characteristics. The image is then rendered by passing light through the negative and a built-in computer-controlled enlarger optically projects this image to the paper for final exposure.

As a byproduct of the process a compact disc recording may be made of the digital images, although a subsequent print made from these may be inferior to an image made from the negative due to digitization noise and lack of dynamic range which are characteristics of the digitizing process.

For better images, the negatives may be reprinted using the same automated machine under operator selection of the print to be made.

== Advantages ==
- The image may be printed to a size different from the negative or transparency. Without an enlarger, only a contact print would be possible, and large images would require large size negatives and hence very large cameras.
- Local contrast and density of various parts of the print can be easily controlled. Changing the amount of light exposing the paper in various areas will change the image density in those areas. A mask with a hole can be used to add extra light to an area which is known as "burning", which will have the effect of darkening the regions with additional exposure, while the use of a small wand to reduce the total exposure to a region is called "dodging" and has the effect of lightening the regions with reduced exposure. The tool is kept moving to avoid producing a sharp edge at the region boundary. Using these techniques it is possible to make significant changes to the mood or emphasis of a photographic print. Similar methods are available with contact printing, but it is more difficult to see the image as it is being manipulated.
- The easel can be tilted to correct or change perspective. For example, a photograph of a building, when taken pointing the camera up, may make the building appear to lay back and not appear vertical. This can be corrected by tilting the easel and possibly using a higher f/ stop number to provide greater depth-of-field to keep the entire easel within focus.
- It is also possible to make composite photographs, such as those by Jerry Uelsmann, by overlaying the print with a hand-cut mask, performing an exposure, and then using the inverse of that mask to perform another exposure with a different negative. This is much more difficult to do well using traditional photographic methods than it is now by using the methods of modern digital image manipulation.

== Image enlargement limits ==
Adjusting elevation knob: change in image size.

The practical amount of enlargement (irrespective of the enlarger structure) will depend upon the grain size of the negative, the sharpness (accuracy) of both the camera and projector lenses, blur in the image due to subject motion, focus, and camera shake during the exposure.

The intended viewing distance for the final product is a consideration. For example, an enlargement from a certain negative as a 12 cm × 18 cm (4.7 in × 7.1 in) print may be sufficient for a scrapbook viewed at 50 cm (20 in), but insufficiently detailed for an A4 print hung on a hallway wall to be viewed at the same distance, though usable at a larger 120 cm × 180 cm (ten times larger) on a billboard to be viewed no closer than 5 m.

Since the inverse-square law applies to illumination intensity at increasing distance, enlargement beyond a certain size becomes impractical, requiring extended exposure times and dependent on the extent to which dampening of enlarger supports may eliminate vibration causing blur in the resulting print.

=== Biggest enlargement ===
The claim for the biggest analogue enlargement ever made from a 35 mm photograph is that for an Ernst Haas wildlife picture taken in Kenya in 1970. It required a 5-hour exposure using the Kodak Colorama process, for a giant transparency. The 508-times enlargement consisted of 20 vertical panels of 3-by-18-foot (0.91 by 5.49 m) for a total size of 18 by 60 feet (5.5 m × 18.3 m). Displayed at Grand Central Station in New York city in 1977, it was Illuminated from behind with 61,000 watts of incandescent light; it was the first time a 35 mm picture had been used for an ongoing series of Kodak advertising displays there c. 1950–1990. The transparency print was destroyed after exhibition.

== Manufacturers ==
As the photographic market has shifted away from film-based towards electronic imaging technology, many manufacturers no longer make enlargers for the professional photographer. Durst, which made high quality enlargers, stopped producing them in 2005, but still supports already sold models. Manufacturers old and new include:

- Agfa
- Beseler
- Bogen
- De Vere
- Durst
- Dunco
- enLARGE
- Fuji
- Gnome Photographic Products (Note: Established in pre-WW2 Stuttgart, moved to UK in 1938, closed in 1994)
- Intrepid Camera
- Kaiser Fototechnik
- Kienzle Phototechnik
- Kindermann
- Klatt
- Leitz
- Liesegang
- Linhof
- LPL
- Lucky (now owned by Kenko)
- Meopta
- Omega
- Ōmiya Shashin-yōhin K. K.
- Polskie Zakłady Optyczne
- Sun Ray Photo Company
- Contact printer for a non-enlarging method of producing photographic prints;
- Gelatin silver process for an overview of the dominant photographic printmaking process;
- Image projector for a directory of projector types;
- Overhead projector for another use of a similar design, for display;
- Epidiascope for a design that could project images of opaque originals;
- Photographic printing for an overview of analogue photographic printmaking methods.

== Optical principles of photo enlargement ==
A photographic enlarger uses a converging lens to project an image of a photographic negative onto light-sensitive photographic paper.

When the negative is placed beyond the focal point of the lens, the light rays passing through it converge on the opposite side, forming a real image.

This image is inverted relative to the negative and can be captured on a physical surface, such as photographic paper. For magnified enlargement, the negative is positioned between the focal point and twice the focal length of the lens. The resulting image is real, inverted and enlarged.

=== Lens formula used ===
The formulae used are
$$\begin{align}
\frac{1}{f} &= \frac{1}{v} + \frac{1}{u} \\
m &= \frac{h_\mathrm{i}}{h_\mathrm{o}} \\
&= \frac{-v}{u}
\end{align}$$

Here the equation determines the relative positioning of the negative,lens and photographic paper required to obtain a focussed image.

Changing the distance the lens and negative will this mean adjusting the image distance to maintain focus,which is achieved by increasingor decreasing the focussing mechanism

In the formula the negative sign indicates the image formed is real and inverted

$u = f\left(1 + \tfrac{1}{M}\right)$ is the formula combining both formulae or $v = f(1 + M)$ if you speak with regard to image distance here $M$ is magnitude of magnification

from this formula we conclude that:

- shorter focal lenth requires shorter optical lengths and longer focal lengths require greater distances.
- Most choices of lenses depends on the negative format and magnification, however one must note that focal length is not the sole factor to decide magnification

==== Aperture ====
the amount of light entering the larger lens is called aperture [or the effective diameter through which light enters in the enlarger lens is called aperture, it influences the sharpness of the image

$N=\frac{f}{D}$

- Wider the aperture more light can pass through the lens,thus helping reduce the exposure time,howerver one must note that it also make optical aberrations more visible,reducing sharpness
- An excessively small aperture increases diffraction
- Enlarging lenses need to thus maintain a balance of aberration,diffraction,exposure time
1. . Enlargers once depended on actual sunlight. Despite the difficulties involved, patrons wanted larger photographs. One observer commented prophetically: “It is supposed that the albums are now full, and that the public now intend to fill their walls!” (Welling 170).
2. Enlargers helped deliver soldiers' letters during World War II. The US MIlitary used a system of V-Mail especially during WW2,where soldiers lettersd were photogrphed and reduced into microfilm,and at the destination were re-enlarged
3. A single small portrait could become a six-foot-tall image.Some like Alfred Buckham used these to create composite landscapes of the British skies.By the coming of the 20th centuary Black rooms turned into community centres
