= Dye coupler =

Chromogenic film and paper used in photography

Dye coupler is present in chromogenic film and paper used in photography, primarily color photography. When a color developer reduces ionized (exposed) silver halide crystals, the developer is oxidized, and the oxidized molecules react with dye coupler molecules to form a dye in situ. The silver image is removed by subsequent bleach and fix processes, so the final image will consist of the dye image.

Dye coupler technology has seen considerable advancement since the beginning of modern color photography. Major film and paper manufacturers have continually improved the stability of the image dye by improving couplers, particularly since the 1980s, so that archival properties of images are enhanced in newer color papers and films. Generally speaking, dye couplers for paper use are given more emphasis on the image permanence than those for film use, but some modern films (such as Fujichrome Provia films) use variants of couplers that were originally designed for paper use to further improve the image permanence.
