= Photographic printing =

Production of an image on photosensitive paper

Photographic printing is the process of producing a final image on paper for viewing, using chemically sensitized paper. The paper is exposed to a photographic negative, a positive transparency (or slide), or a digital image file projected using an enlarger or digital exposure unit such as a LightJet or Minilab printer. Alternatively, the negative or transparency may be placed atop the paper and directly exposed, creating a contact print. Digital photographs are commonly printed on plain paper, for example by a color printer, but this is not considered "photographic printing".

Following exposure, the paper is processed to reveal and make permanent the latent image.

== Printing on black-and-white paper ==
The process consists of four major steps, performed in a photographic darkroom or within an automated photo printing machine. These steps are:

- Exposure of the image onto the sensitized paper using a contact printer or enlarger;
- Processing of the latent image using the following chemical process:
  - Development of the exposed image reduces the silver halide in the latent image to metallic silver;
  - Stopping development by neutralising, diluting or removing the developing chemicals;
  - Fixing the image by dissolving undeveloped silver halide from the light-sensitive emulsion:
  - Washing thoroughly to remove processing chemicals protects the finished print from fading and deterioration.

Optionally, after fixing, the print is treated with a hypo clearing agent to ensure complete removal of the fixer, which would otherwise compromise the long term stability of the image. Prints can be chemically toned or hand coloured after processing.

=== Panalure paper ===
Kodak Panalure is a panchromatic black-and-white photographic printing paper. Panalure was developed to facilitate the printing of full-tone black-and-white images from colour negatives – a difficult task with conventional orthochromatic papers due to the orange tint of the film base. Panalure also finds application as paper negatives in large format cameras. It is generally not suitable for conventional black-and-white printing, since it must be handled and developed in near-complete darkness.

In June 2005 Kodak announced that it would discontinue the production and sale of its black-and-white photographic papers, a range that included Panalure.

=== Silver mirroring ===
Silver mirroring, or "silvering", is a form of deterioration of black-and-white photographs. Oxidising gases in the air, particularly in the presence of moisture, attack the finely divided image silver; the silver ions produced can migrate to the surface of the emulsion, where they form a thin reflective deposit such as silver sulfide. This results in a slightly bluish, reflective patch in the darkest part of a print or negative when examined in raking light. It often indicates improper storage, such as exposure to air pollutants and humidity or the use of poor-quality enclosures.

== Printing on coloured paper ==
For more info see also: Chromogenic print

Colour papers require specific chemical processing in proprietary chemicals. The current process for printing colour negatives is RA-4; colour transparencies were printed on Ilfochrome until the material was discontinued in 2012.

=== Printing from colour negatives ===
- Colour negatives are printed on RA-4 papers and produce a Type C print. These are essentially the same as colour negative films in that they consist of three emulsion layers, each sensitive to red, green and blue light. Upon processing, colour couplers produce cyan, magenta and yellow dyes, representing the true colours of the subject. The processing sequence is very similar to the C-41 process.
- Rollei makes a film called 'Digibase 200 Pro' that is like a conventional C-41 film but it has no orange mask, allowing easy prints on black-and-white paper with a grade 2 or 3 variable contrast filter

=== Printing from colour transparencies ===
- Ilfochrome paper uses the dye destruction process to produce prints from positive transparencies. The colour dyes are incorporated into the paper and bleached during processing. Ilfochrome, EP2 and Type R print papers and chemicals are no longer in production.

== See also ==
- Contact print
- Film developing
- Gelatin-silver process
- List of photographic processes
- Photographic paper
- Photographic print toning
- Standard photographic print sizes
