= HDJ-1000 =

Professional DJ headphones

The HDJ-1000 are professional DJ headphones from Pioneer's Pro DJ line.

== Specifications ==
Pioneer HDJ-1000

They are tightly closed dynamic headphones. Their impedance is 40 Ohms, with a maximum input of 3,500 mW and an output sound level of 107 dB/mW. The speaker unit type is a 50 mm dome. Connection is via a gold-plated 3.5 mm 3P mini plug and a 3.94 ft long single-coiled cable (approx. 9.84 ft when straight). The HDJ-1000 headphones weigh 9.5 oz (excluding cord) and come with a 06.3 mm 3P plug adapter with screw and carrying bag.

These headphones have grown to be a DJ standard around the world. Their approximate price is US$159.99. They include a mono–stereo selector switch as well as the ability to replace the cord assembly.

Recently, counterfeit versions of these headphones have been known to exist (See example). There are notable differences between the real and the counterfeits, including the colour of the joints on each side (real ones are silver, whereas the fake ones are black) and the length of the headband with the Pioneer name imprinted on it (fake versions have it much shorter than the originals). Also the 'o' in the logo of the fake ones is circular, while the original is more oval shaped.
