= 2025 Birmingham Bowl =

Postseason college football bowl game

2025 JLab Birmingham Bowl
- 19th Birmingham Bowl
| Georgia Southern Eagles | Appalachian State Mountaineers |
| (6–6) | (5–7) |
| Sun Belt | Sun Belt |
| 29 | 10 |
| Head coach: Clay Helton | Head coach: Dowell Loggains |
| | 1 | 2 | 3 | 4 | Total |
|---|---|---|---|---|---|
| Georgia Southern | 7 | 6 | 13 | 3 | 29 |
| Appalachian State | 0 | 7 | 3 | 0 | 10 |
- Date: December 29, 2025
- Season: 2025
- Stadium: Protective Stadium
- Location: Birmingham, Alabama
- MVP: OJ Arnold (RB, Georgia Southern)
- Favorite: Georgia Southern by 7
- Referee: Rory Bernard (CUSA)
- Attendance: 12,092

United States TV coverage
- Network: ESPN
- Announcers: Taylor Zarzour (play-by-play), Matt Stinchcomb (analyst), and Alyssa Lang (sideline)

The 2025 Birmingham Bowl was a college football bowl game played on December 29, 2025, at Protective Stadium in Birmingham, Alabama. The nineteenth annual Birmingham Bowl game, began at approximately 1:00 p.m. CST and aired on ESPN. The Birmingham Bowl was one of the 2025–26 bowl games concluding the 2025 FBS football season. The game was sponsored by consumer audio company JLab Audio and officially known as the JLab Birmingham Bowl.

The Georgia Southern Eagles defeated the Appalachian State Mountaineers, 29–10.

Because none of the conferences the bowls had ties with had enough eligible teams to qualify, the bids to the bowl were offered as at-large selections; in addition to this, due to the bowl games not having enough teams with the necessary 6 wins to qualify for a bid, a team with a losing record was selected. The Sun Belt Conference received one of the bids for Georgia Southern, and once Appalachian State accepted the other, this left the Birmingham Bowl with a matchup of teams from the same conference.

== Teams ==
Based on conference tie-ins, the game was expected to feature teams from the American Conference, Atlantic Coast Conference, or the Southeastern Conference, but no teams from those conferences were available. Two Sun Belt Conference foes were chosen – the Georgia Southern Eagles and the Appalachian State Mountaineers – providing a rare example of a non-playoff bowl game between two teams from the same conference. (Note: Following the 1979 Orange Bowl, contested between two Big Eight teams, two teams from the same conference did not meet in a bowl game until the 2015 Arizona Bowl, contested between two Mountain West teams. Later examples include the 2024 Alamo Bowl, contested between two teams from the Big 12, and earlier examples date to at least the 1944 Rose Bowl, contested by two teams from the Pacific Coast Conference.) This was a rematch of the two teams' regular season game on November 6, when Georgia Southern beat Appalachian State, 25–23. Overall, this marked the 41st meeting between the two teams—a rivalry colloquially known as "Deeper Than Hate"—with Appalachian State holding a 21–18–1 (.538) all-time advantage entering the game.

=== Georgia Southern Eagles ===
Georgia Southern opened their season with four losses in their first six games. The Eagles went on to win four of their final six games and carried a 6–6 record into the Birmingham Bowl.

=== Appalachian State Mountaineers ===
Appalachian State won four of their first six games, but then lost four games in a row. The Mountaineers split their final two games and entered the Birmingham Bowl with a 5–7 record. While a 5–7 record is not considered bowl eligible, Appalachian State received a bowl bid due to bowl-eligible teams opting out.

== Game summary ==
2025 JLab Birmingham Bowl

| Quarter | 1 | 2 | 3 | 4 | Total |
|---|---|---|---|---|---|
| Georgia Southern | 7 | 6 | 13 | 3 | 29 |
| Appalachian State | 0 | 7 | 3 | 0 | 10 |

at Protective Stadium • Birmingham, Alabama

- Date: December 29, 2025
- Game time: 1:00 p.m. CST
- Game weather: Sunny • Temperature: 44 °F (7 °C) • Wind: 16 mph (26 km/h) northwest
- Game attendance: 12,092
- Referee: Rory Bernard
- TV announcers (ESPN): Taylor Zarzour (play-by-play), Matt Stinchcomb (analyst), and Alyssa Lang (sideline)
- Box score

Game information

First Quarter

- (8:23) GASO – Terrance Gibbs 1 yard run, Tripp Bryant kick (Drive: 11 plays, 66 yards, 5:14; Georgia Southern 7–0)

Second Quarter

- (9:00) GASO – Tripp Bryant 23 yard field goal (Drive: 11 plays, 73 yards, 5:20; Georgia Southern 10–0)
- (1:51) APP – Matthew Wilson 6 yard run, Dominic De Freitas kick (Drive: 7 plays, 53 yards, 2:43; Georgia Southern 10–7)
- (0:01) GASO – Tripp Bryant 36 yard field goal (Drive: 10 plays, 57 yards, 1:51; Georgia Southern 13–7)

Third Quarter

- (13:34) GASO – Weston Bryant 3 yard run (two-point conversion failed) (Drive: 3 plays, 73 yards, 1:22; Georgia Southern 19–7)
- (8:50) GASO – Marcus Sanders Jr. 32 yard pass from JC French, Tripp Bryant kick (Drive: 5 plays, 65 yards, 1:29; Georgia Southern 26–7)
- (3:46) APP – Dominic De Freitas 27 yard field goal (Drive: 9 plays, 66 yards, 4:58; Georgia Southern 26–10)

Fourth Quarter

- (3:57) GASO – Tripp Bryant 27 yard field goal (Drive: 17 plays, 81 yards, 10:02; Georgia Southern 29–10)

=== Statistics ===
| Statistics | GASO | APST |
|---|---|---|
| First downs | 22 | 21 |
| Plays–yards | 65–413 | 62–379 |
| Rushes–yards | 38–242 | 33–187 |
| Passing yards | 171 | 192 |
| Passing: comp–att–int | 18–27–1 | 16–29–4 |
| Time of possession | 30:25 | 29:35 |

| Team | Category | Player | Statistics |
|---|---|---|---|
| Georgia Southern | Passing | JC French | 18/25, 171 yards, 1 TD |
| Georgia Southern | Rushing | OJ Arnold | 11 carries, 152 yards |
| Georgia Southern | Receiving | Marcus Sanders Jr. | 5 receptions, 72 yards, 1 TD |
| Appalachian State | Passing | Matthew Wilson | 12/22, 128 yards, 2 INT |
| Appalachian State | Rushing | Matthew Wilson | 12 carries, 110 yards, 1 TD |
| Appalachian State | Receiving | Dalton Stroman | 3 receptions, 96 yards |

== See also ==
- List of college football post-season games that were rematches of regular season games
