= Pioneer SX-1980 =

AM/FM radio receiver introduced in 1978

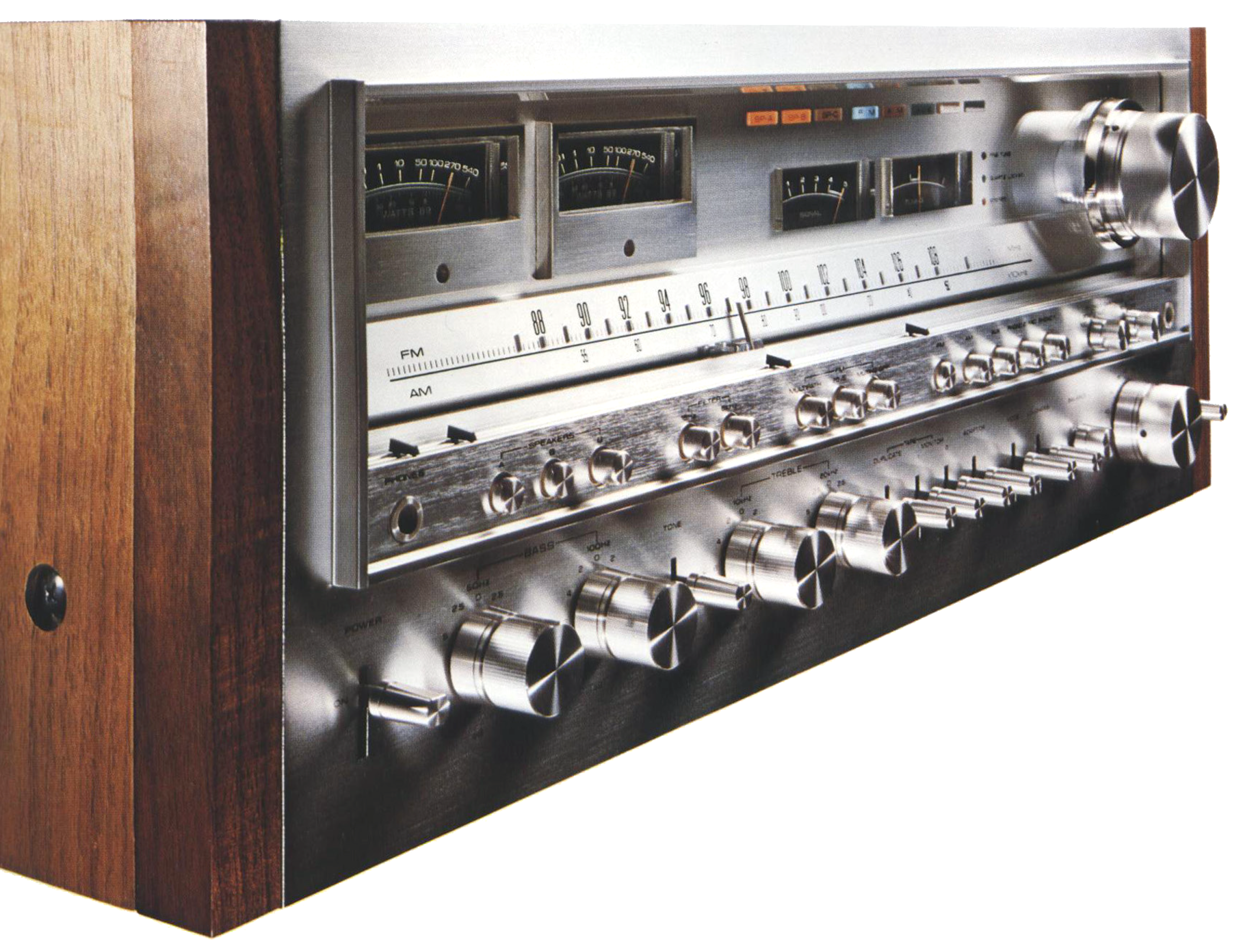
Angle view of the Pioneer SX-1980 stereo receiver.

The Pioneer SX-1980 is an AM/FM radio receiver that Pioneer Corporation introduced in 1978, to be matched with the HPM series of speakers. It was rated at 270 watts RMS per channel into 8 ohms, both channels driven. However, in the September 1978 issue of the magazine Audio, Leonard Feldman performed a specification test on the SX-1980 and stated in his report:

Though the new [IHF mandated] "Dynamic Headroom" measurement is specified in dB, it should be mentioned that based upon the short-term signal used to measure the 2.3 dB headroom of this amplifier, it was producing nearly 460 watts of short-term power under these test conditions!

At an official rating of 270 watts RMS per channel into 8 ohms with a measured 2.3 dB dynamic headroom, this makes the SX-1980 Pioneer's most powerful receiver, as well as being one of the most powerful receivers ever manufactured in the world, to date. It was also tested in the December 1978 issue of Stereo Review. Some results were:

With both channels driving 8-ohm loads at 1,000 Hz, the outputs clipped at 300 watts per channel (IHF clipping headroom equals 0.46 dB). The dynamic headroom was 0.63 dB. ... The distortion at 1,000 Hz was nearly unmeasurable at any power level. It was no more than 0.003% from 0.1 to 100 watts output, rose to 0.0045% between 200 and 290 watts, and reached its maximum of 0.008% at 300 watts, just before clipping occurred. The intermodulation distortion (IM) was about 0.03% at most power levels up to 100 watts and reached 0.045% at 300 watts.

The SX-1980 is 22 inches (560 mm) wide, 19.5 inches (500 mm) deep, and 8.25 inches (210 mm) high, and weighs 78 pounds (35 kg). The case, like the Pioneer HPM-100, has a fine-grain, walnut veneer finish. It has a pair of large die-cast aluminium heatsinks, located at the sides towards the back, in order to dissipate the immense heat that the receiver can generate. The receiver had 12 Field Effect Transistors (FETs), 11 Integrated Circuits (ICs), 130 transistors and 84 diodes. Its retail price in 1978 was US$1295. According to the CPI inflation calculator, that would equate to about US$5,450 in 2021. The SX-1980 is known for its total harmonic distortion (THD) rating of less than 0.03% at rated power, which is much less than the 1–10% commonly used today. The build quality is also higher than average. The unit compares favorably in side-by-side tests with newer large receivers. With a rated power consumption of 1400 volt-amperes or nearly 1000 watts, it would consume a fair amount of the power a standard 15-amp, 120-volt (North America) circuit can safely deliver.

From the operating instructions document:

The adoption of a single-stage differential amplifier with low-noise dual transistors, a current mirror load and a 3-stage Darlington triple SEPP circuit provides a bumper power output of 270 watts + 270 watts (20 hertz to 20,000 hertz with no more than 0.03% THD) which is extremely stable. ... The power amplifier is configured as a DC power amplifier with the capacitors removed from the NFB circuit for a flat gain response. ... The large-sized toroidal transformers with their superb regulation employ 22,000 μF large-capacity electrolytic capacitors (two per each channel). There are independent dual power supply circuits with separate power transformer windings to provide power for the left and right channels. ... The FM front end incorporates a two-stage RF circuit that employs a 5-gang tuning capacitor and three dual gate MOS FETs for high gain and low noise. This configuration excels in ridding the sound of undesirable interference ... The FM IF amplifier combines five dual-element ceramic filters ... for high selectivity (80 dB) and low distortion ... The local oscillator includes Pioneer's very own quartz sampling locked APC (Automatic Phase Control). The output of this extremely precise quartz oscillator is divided into frequencies of 100 kHz and so reception frequencies which are a multiple of 100 kHz are locked at every 100 kHz.

Apart from its high output power capability, the Pioneer SX-1980 had quite advanced performance in many other important areas. The THD versus frequency response curve showed very low distortion levels over a wide range of operating conditions. Phono cartridge load selectors allowed the user to select from three input resistances (10, 50, and 100 kΩ) and four input capacitances (100, 200, 300, and 400 pF). The RIAA equalisation was accurate to within ±0.2 dB from 20 Hz to 20 kHz (tested as ±0.1 dB), and a high-accuracy performance specification such as this is not often achieved, even today.

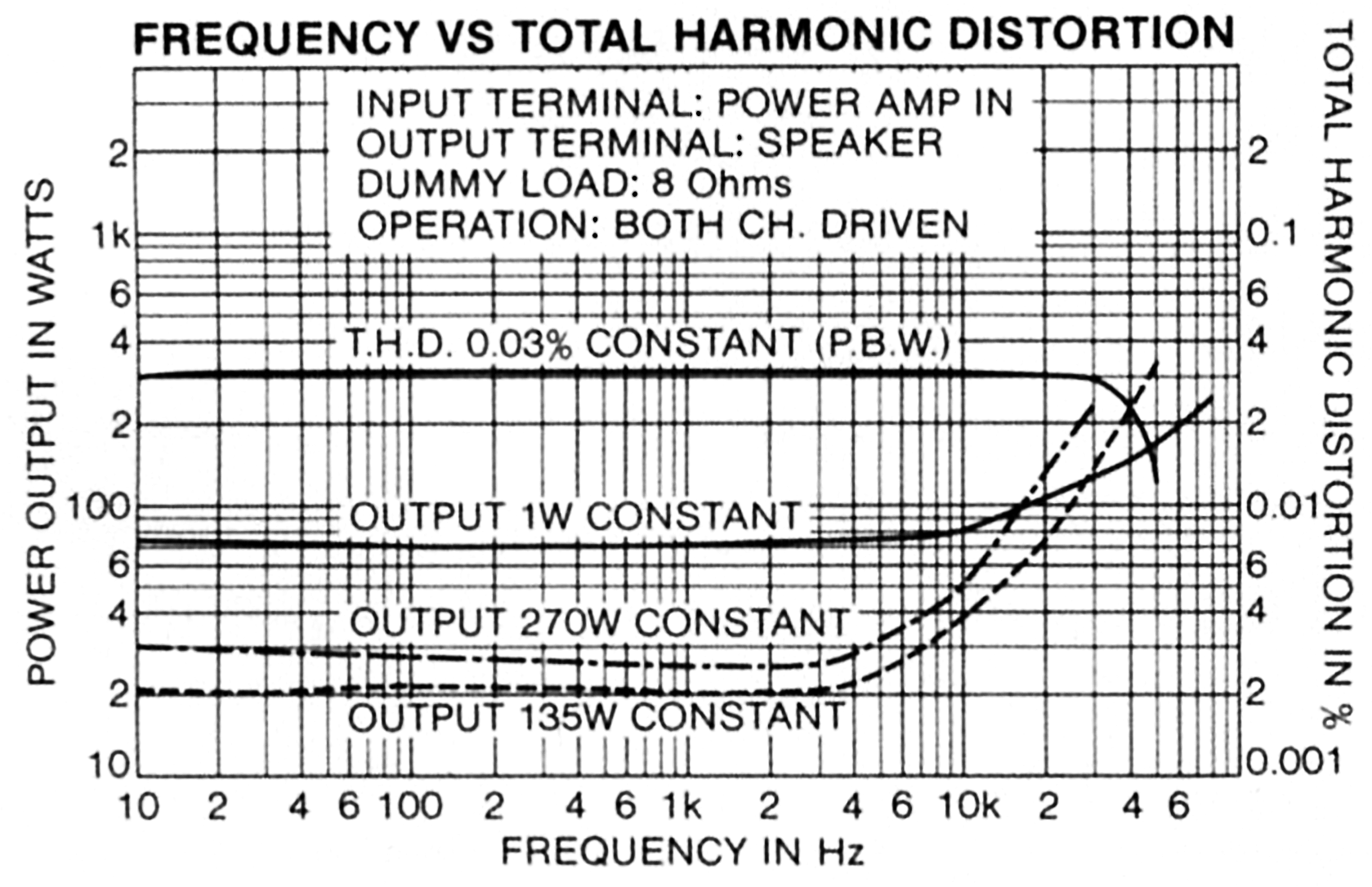
Pioneer SX-1980 stereo receiver total harmonic distortion versus frequency for a variety of output power levels.

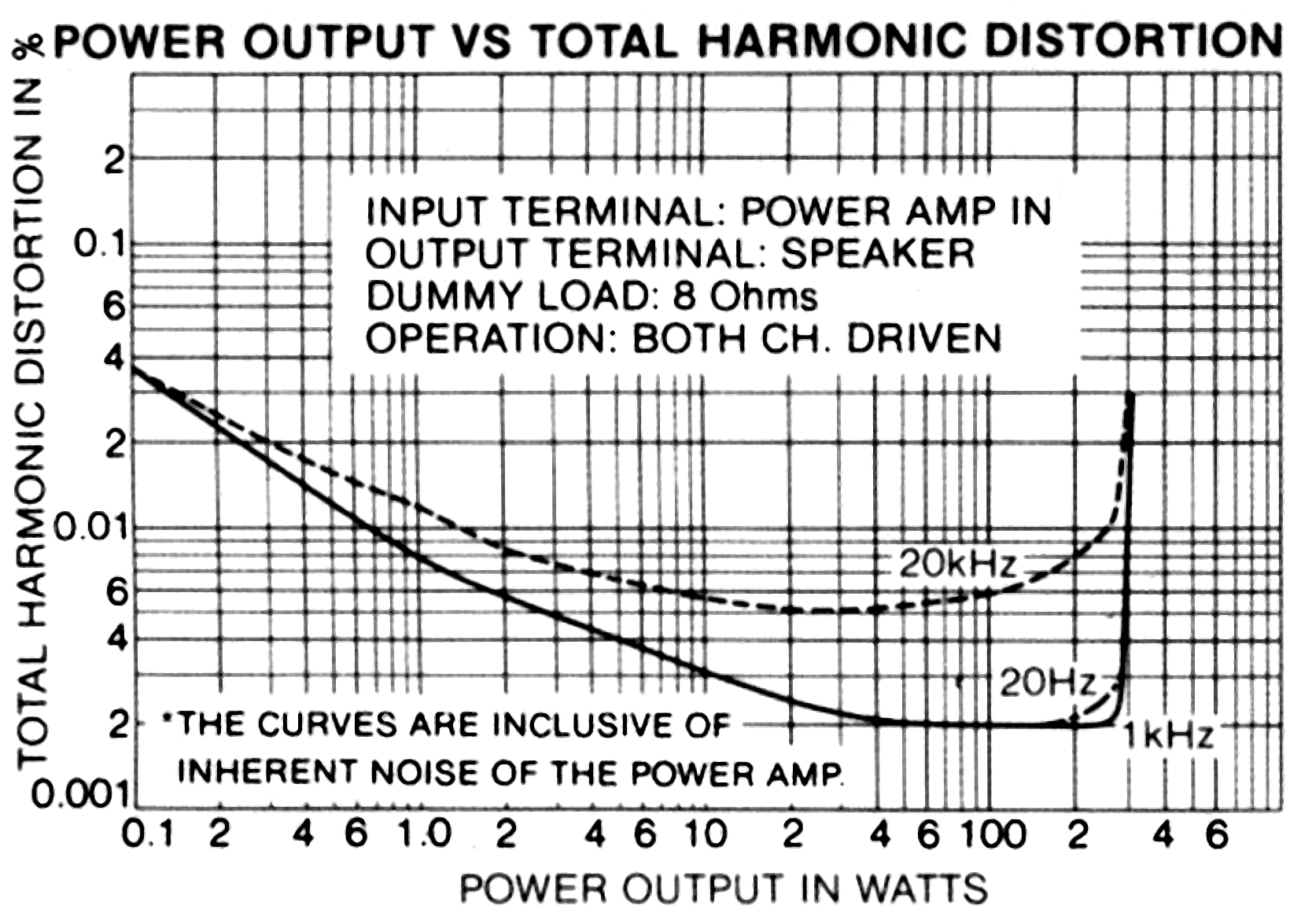
Pioneer SX-1980 stereo receiver total harmonic distortion versus power output at 20 Hz, 1 kHz, and 20 kHz.

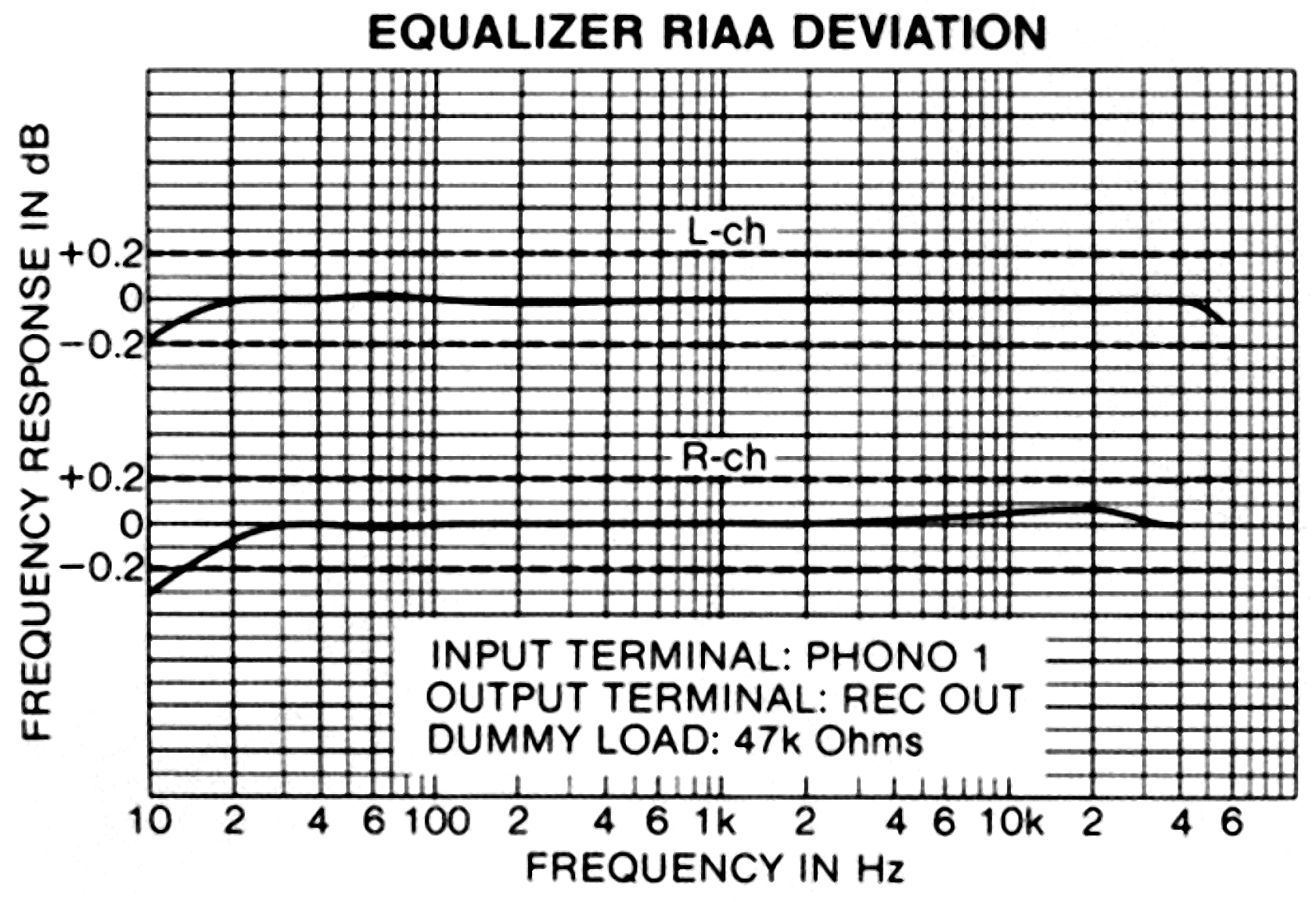
Pioneer SX-1980 stereo receiver RIAA equalisation deviation as a function of frequency.
