= Birmingham Bowl =

College football bowl game

- JLab Birmingham Bowl
- Stadium: Protective Stadium
- Location: Birmingham, Alabama
- Previous stadiums: Legion Field (2006–2020)
- Operated: 2006–present
- Conference tie-ins: The American, SEC; Alternates: C-USA, MAC
- Payout: US$1,374,545 (2019 season)
- Website: birminghambowl.com

Sponsors
- Papa John's (2006–2010); BBVA Compass (2011–2014); Sterling Jewelers (2018); TicketSmarter (2019–2022); 76 (2023); JLab Audio (2025–present)

Former names
- Birmingham Bowl (2006, working title); PapaJohns.com Bowl (2006–2010); BBVA Compass Bowl (2011–2014); Birmingham Bowl (2015–2017); Jared Birmingham Bowl (2018); TicketSmarter Birmingham Bowl (2019–2022); 76 Birmingham Bowl (2023)

2025 matchup
- Georgia Southern vs. Appalachian State (Georgia Southern 29–10)

The Birmingham Bowl is a post-season NCAA-sanctioned Division I FBS college football bowl game played annually in Birmingham, Alabama. First held in 2006, the game is owned and operated by ESPN Events. From its inception through 2020, the game was played at Legion Field; since the December 2021 game, it has been held at Protective Stadium. The University of Alabama at Birmingham (UAB) also provides marketing, management and game-day operations support.

The game was previously known as the PapaJohns.com Bowl (2006–2010) and the BBVA Compass Bowl (2011–2014). A multi-year sponsorship agreement with JLab Audio was announced in September 2025, making the game's full name the JLab Birmingham Bowl.

== History ==
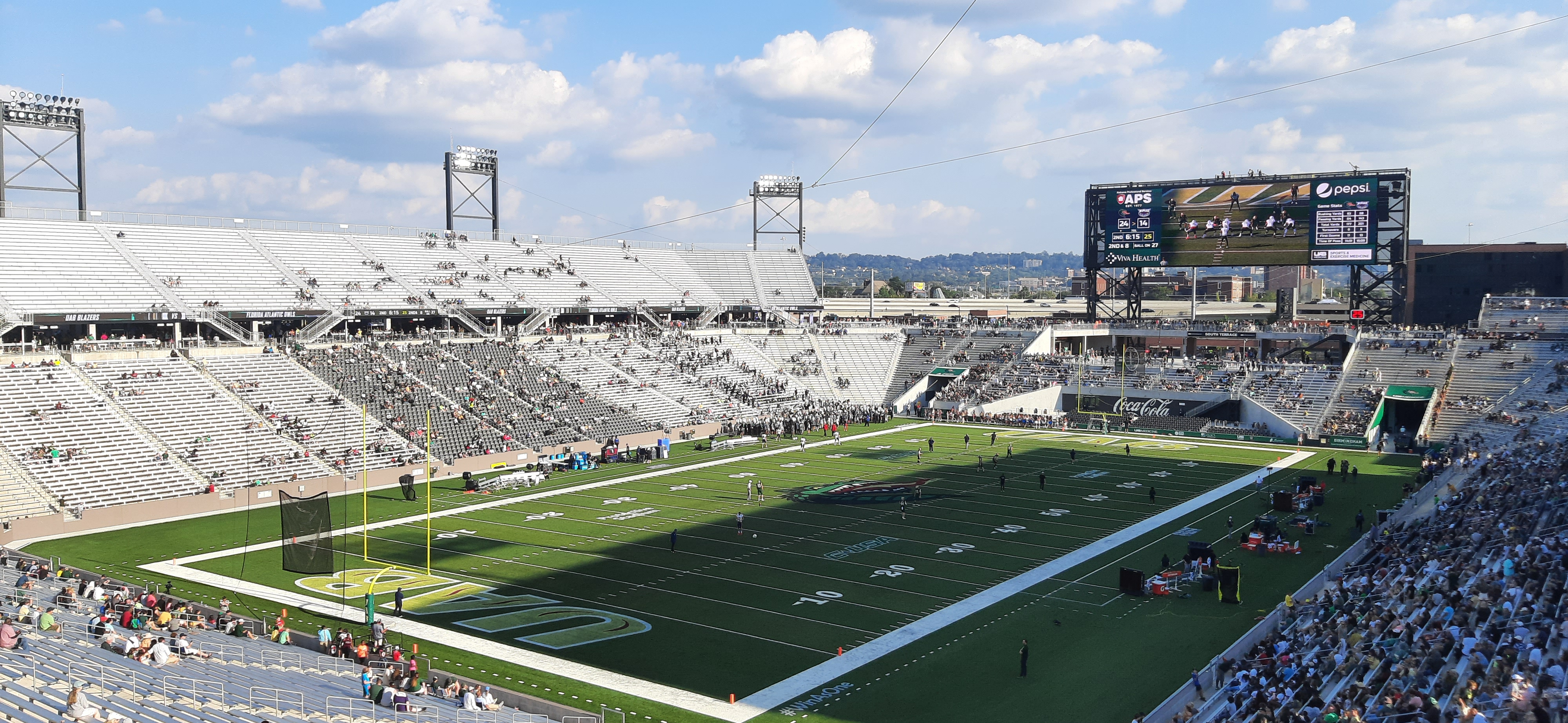
Protective Stadium, current venue of the Birmingham Bowl

The bowl marked the return of post-season football to the city of Birmingham, which previously hosted the Dixie Bowl from 1947 to 1948, the Hall of Fame Classic from 1977 to 1984 (which relocated to Tampa and became the Outback Bowl), and the All-American Bowl from 1985 to 1990 (which was canceled when the SEC Championship Game was awarded to the city).

In the inaugural edition of the bowl, played on December 23, 2006, the South Florida Bulls defeated the East Carolina Pirates, 24–7, in front of a crowd of 32,023. Running back Benjamin Williams of South Florida scored the bowl's first points on a 16-yard touchdown run less than two minutes into the game; he added a second touchdown during the first quarter and was named the game's MVP.

After being held in December for its first three years, the fourth edition of the bowl was played in January 2010. As a result, there was no game during the 2009 calendar year. The bowl was subsequently played in January through its ninth edition, held in January 2015. The tenth edition of the bowl saw a return to December, resulting in two editions of the bowl being played during calendar year 2015. The bowl remained in December through its 13th edition, held in December 2018. The 14th edition of the bowl was held in January 2020, thus there was no game during calendar year 2019.

The January 2021 edition of the bowl was cancelled due to an insufficient number of teams being available to fill all 2020–21 bowl games, following a season impacted by the COVID-19 pandemic.

The bowl was originally played at Legion Field, located west of central Birmingham. With construction of a new football stadium on the grounds of the Birmingham–Jefferson Convention Complex closer to central Birmingham, the bowl was expected to move there. Since the December 2021 edition, the bowl has been played at Protective Stadium.

=== Conference tie-ins ===
The bowl originally had a four-year agreement with Conference USA (C-USA) to match a representative of that conference against an opponent from the Big East Conference, but the bowl's officials later appealed to the NCAA for a recertification which was granted in late April 2008. In 2008 and 2009, the bowl featured the ninth bowl-eligible team of the Southeastern Conference (SEC) and a team from the Big East Conference.

The game currently features teams from the SEC and the American Athletic Conference (The American). Should either of these conferences not fulfill their bowl commitments, a team from C-USA or the Mid-American Conference (MAC) will take their place, provided it is bowl eligible. Otherwise, the game will choose an at-large team. This happened in 2008, when the SEC was unable to send a team; the bowl selected North Carolina State of the Atlantic Coast Conference (ACC) to face Rutgers from the Big East, even though the bowl had an arrangement with the Sun Belt Conference at the time, and that conference had at least one bowl-eligible team it could send. This occurred again in 2022 when the bid was brought down to the Sun Belt Conference.

=== Sponsorship ===
From 2006 through 2010, the game was the PapaJohns.com Bowl, named after Papa John's Pizza, who became the title sponsor signing a multi-year agreement in November 2006. On August 6, 2010, Papa John's announced it would not renew its sponsorship, after having secured a sponsorship deal with the National Football League.

The game was temporarily renamed the Birmingham Bowl until BBVA Compass was announced as its title sponsor on November 4, 2010, officially changing its name to the BBVA Compass Bowl. The bowl was sponsored by BBVA through the January 2014 game, following which BBVA Compass declined to renew its sponsorship, and the game was subsequently renamed the Birmingham Bowl.

The 2018 edition was sponsored by the Jared brand of Sterling Jewelers, and the 2019–2022 editions were sponsored by TicketSmarter.

On November 30, 2023, the 76 chain of gas stations was announced as the new sponsor of the game. This arrangement was in place for just one edition of the game.

In September 2025, a four-year sponsorship agreement with JLab Audio was announced.

== Game results ==
Rankings are from the AP Poll from before the game was played.

Date	Bowl name	Winning team		Losing team		Attendance
December 23, 2006	PapaJohns.com Bowl	South Florida	24	East Carolina	7	32,023
December 22, 2007	PapaJohns.com Bowl	20 Cincinnati	31	Southern Miss	21	35,258
December 29, 2008	PapaJohns.com Bowl	Rutgers	29	NC State	23	38,582
January 2, 2010	PapaJohns.com Bowl	Connecticut	20	South Carolina	7	45,254
January 8, 2011	BBVA Compass Bowl	Pittsburgh	27	Kentucky	10	41,207
January 7, 2012	BBVA Compass Bowl	SMU	28	Pittsburgh	6	29,726
January 5, 2013	BBVA Compass Bowl	Ole Miss	38	Pittsburgh	17	59,135
January 4, 2014	BBVA Compass Bowl	Vanderbilt	41	Houston	24	42,717
January 3, 2015	Birmingham Bowl	Florida	28	East Carolina	20	30,083
December 30, 2015	Birmingham Bowl	Auburn	31	Memphis	10	59,430
December 29, 2016	Birmingham Bowl	25 South Florida	46	South Carolina	39 (OT)	31,229
December 23, 2017	Birmingham Bowl	23 South Florida	38	Texas Tech	34	28,623
December 22, 2018	Birmingham Bowl	Wake Forest	37	Memphis	34	25,717
January 2, 2020	Birmingham Bowl	23 Cincinnati	38	Boston College	6	27,193
January 1, 2021	Canceled					—
December 28, 2021	Birmingham Bowl	21 Houston	17	Auburn	13	47,100
December 27, 2022	Birmingham Bowl	East Carolina	53	Coastal Carolina	29	15,901
December 23, 2023	Birmingham Bowl	Duke	17	Troy	10	20,023
December 27, 2024	Birmingham Bowl	Vanderbilt	35	Georgia Tech	27	33,840
December 29, 2025	Birmingham Bowl	Georgia Southern	29	Appalachian State	10	12,092

== MVPs ==
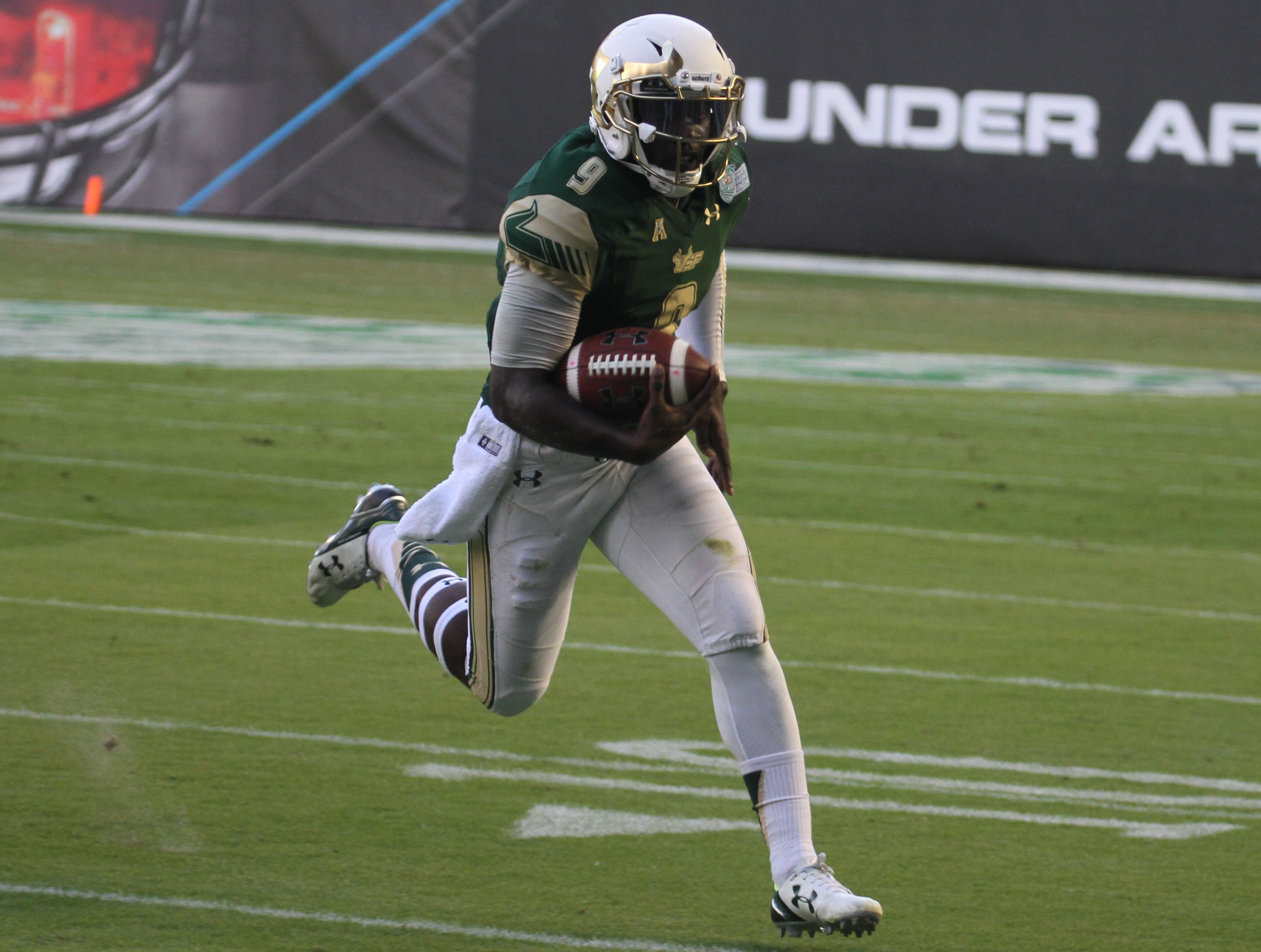
Two-time MVP winner Quinton Flowers

Date	Name	School	Position
December 23, 2006	Benjamin Williams	South Florida	RB
December 22, 2007	Ben Mauk	Cincinnati	QB
December 29, 2008	Mike Teel	Rutgers	QB
January 2, 2010	Andre Dixon	Connecticut	RB
January 8, 2011	Dion Lewis	Pittsburgh	RB
January 7, 2012	Darius Johnson	SMU	WR
January 5, 2013	Bo Wallace	Ole Miss	QB
January 4, 2014	Jordan Matthews	Vanderbilt	WR
January 3, 2015	Adam Lane	Florida	RB
December 30, 2015	Jovon Robinson	Auburn	RB
December 29, 2016	Quinton Flowers	South Florida	QB
December 23, 2017	Quinton Flowers	South Florida	QB
December 22, 2018	Jamie Newman	Wake Forest	QB
January 2, 2020	Desmond Ridder	Cincinnati	QB
December 28, 2021	Clayton Tune	Houston	QB
December 27, 2022	Holton Ahlers	East Carolina	QB
December 23, 2023	Chandler Rivers	Duke	CB
December 27, 2024	Diego Pavia	Vanderbilt	QB
December 29, 2025	OJ Arnold	Georgia Southern	RB

== Most appearances ==
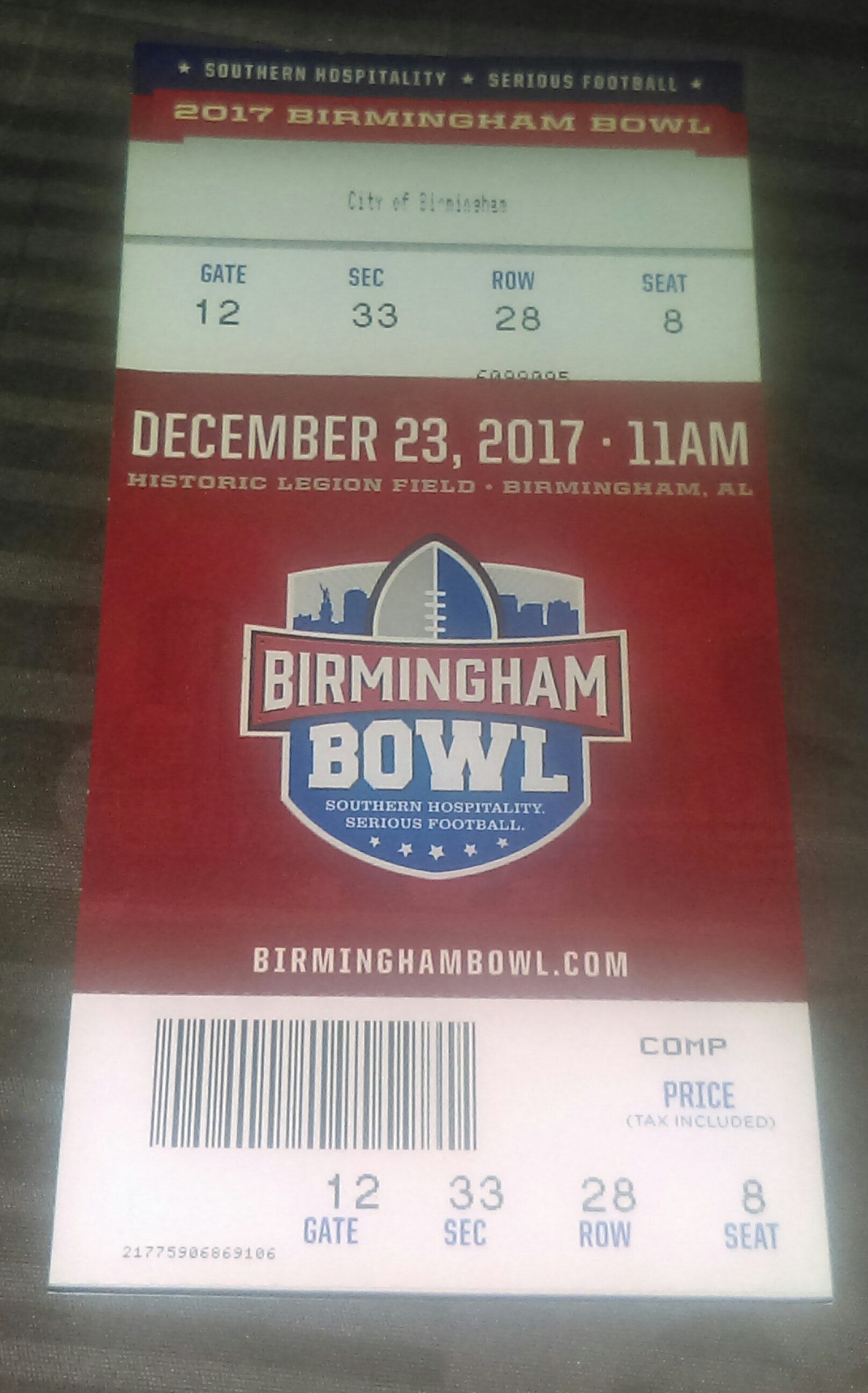
A 2017 Birmingham Bowl ticket

Updated through the December 2025 edition (19 games, 38 total appearances).

Teams with multiple appearances

Rank	Team	Appearances	Record
1	South Florida	3	3–0
1	Pittsburgh	3	1–2
1	East Carolina	3	1–2
4	Cincinnati	2	2–0
4	Vanderbilt	2	2–0
4	Auburn	2	1–1
4	Houston	2	1–1
4	Memphis	2	0–2
4	South Carolina	2	0–2

Teams with a single appearance

Won (8): Duke, Florida, Georgia Southern, Ole Miss, Rutgers, SMU, UConn, Wake Forest
Lost (9): Appalachian State, Boston College, Coastal Carolina, Georgia Tech, Kentucky, NC State, Southern Miss, Texas Tech, Troy

== Appearances by conference ==
Updated through the December 2025 edition (19 games, 38 total appearances).

Conference	Record				Appearances by season	
Conference	Games	W	L	Win pct.	Won	Lost
American	16	10	6	.625	2006, 2007, 2008, 2009*, 2010*, 2016, 2017, 2019*, 2021, 2022	2011*, 2012*, 2013*, 2014*, 2015, 2018
SEC	9	5	4	.556	2012*, 2013*, 2014*, 2015, 2024	2009*, 2010*, 2016, 2021
ACC	5	2	3	.400	2018, 2023	2008, 2019*, 2024
Sun Belt	4	1	3	.250	2025	2022, 2023, 2025
CUSA	3	1	2	.333	2011*	2006, 2007
Big 12	1	0	1	.000		2017

- Games marked with an asterisk (*) were played in January of the following calendar year.
- Record for the American Conference includes appearances of the Big East Conference, as the American retains the charter of the original Big East, following its 2013 realignment. Teams representing the Big East appeared in seven games, compiling a 5–2 record.
- The 2025 game was contested between two Sun Belt teams.

== Game records ==
Team	Record, Team vs. Opponent	Year
Most points scored (one team)	53, East Carolina vs. Coastal Carolina	2022
Most points scored (losing team)	39, South Carolina vs. South Florida	2016
Most points scored (both teams)	85, South Florida (46) vs. South Carolina (39)	2016
Fewest points allowed	6, shared by: SMU vs. Pittsburgh; Boston College vs. Cincinnati	2012; 2020
Largest margin of victory	32, Cincinnati vs. Boston College	2020
Total yards	561, South Florida vs. Texas Tech	2017
Rushing yards	343, Cincinnati vs. Boston College	2020
Passing yards	427, East Carolina vs. Florida	Jan. 2015
First downs	33, Cincinnati vs. Boston College	2020
Fewest yards allowed	164, Cincinnati vs. Boston College	2020
Fewest rushing yards allowed	10, SMU vs. Pittsburgh	2012
Fewest passing yards allowed	87, Cincinnati vs. Boston College	2020
Individual	Record, Player, Team vs. Opponent	Year
All-purpose yards	318, Tony Pollard (Memphis) (109 rushing, 209 kick returns)	2018
Touchdowns (all-purpose)	3, shared by: Quinton Flowers (South Florida); Jamie Newman (Wake Forest); Desmond Ridder (Cincinnati)	2016; 2018; Jan. 2020
Total offense	419, Jamie Newman (Wake Forest) (328 yards passing, 91 rushing)	2018
Total touchdowns	6, Holton Ahlers (East Carolina)	2022
Rushing yards	155, Damion Fletcher (Southern Miss)	2007
Rushing touchdowns	3, shared by: Quinton Flowers (South Florida); Jamie Newman (Wake Forest); Desmond Ridder (Cincinnati)	2016; 2018; Jan. 2020
Passing yards	427, Shane Carden (East Carolina)	Jan. 2015
Passing touchdowns	5, Holton Ahlers (East Carolina)	2022
Receptions	14, Deebo Samuel (South Carolina)	2016
Receiving yards	190, Deebo Samuel (South Carolina)	2016
Receiving touchdowns	2, shared by: Dominick Goodman (Cincinnati); Tyre McCants (South Florida); Isaiah Winstead (East Carolina)	2007; 2017; 2022
Tackles	17, shared by: Jason Hendricks (Pittsburgh); Shareef White (Memphis)	2013; Dec. 2015
Sacks	3.0, shared by: Margus Hunt (SMU); Dante Fowler (Florida)	2012; Jan. 2015
Interceptions	2, shared by: Reggis Ball (Memphis); Dorrian Smith (Georgia Southern)	Dec. 2015; 2025
Long Plays	Record, Player, Team vs. Opponent	Year
Touchdown run	62 yds., shared by: I’Tavius Mathers (Ole Miss); Daniel Spencer (Houston)	2013; 2014
Touchdown pass	86 yds., Treon Harris to Ahmad Fulwood (Florida)	Jan. 2015
Kickoff return	97 yds., Tony Pollard (Memphis)	2018
Punt return	56 yds., Marcus Davis (Auburn)	Dec. 2015
Interception return	53 yds., Reggis Ball (Memphis)	Dec. 2015
Fumble return	–	–
Punt	69 yds., Jesse Mirco (Vanderbilt)	2024
Field goal	53 yds., Jake Elliott (Memphis)	Dec. 2015

== Media coverage ==
Except for the first two editions of the bowl, which were televised on ESPN2, the bowl has been televised on ESPN.
