= Pioneer Corporation =

Japanese audiovisual equipment company

- Logo used since 1998

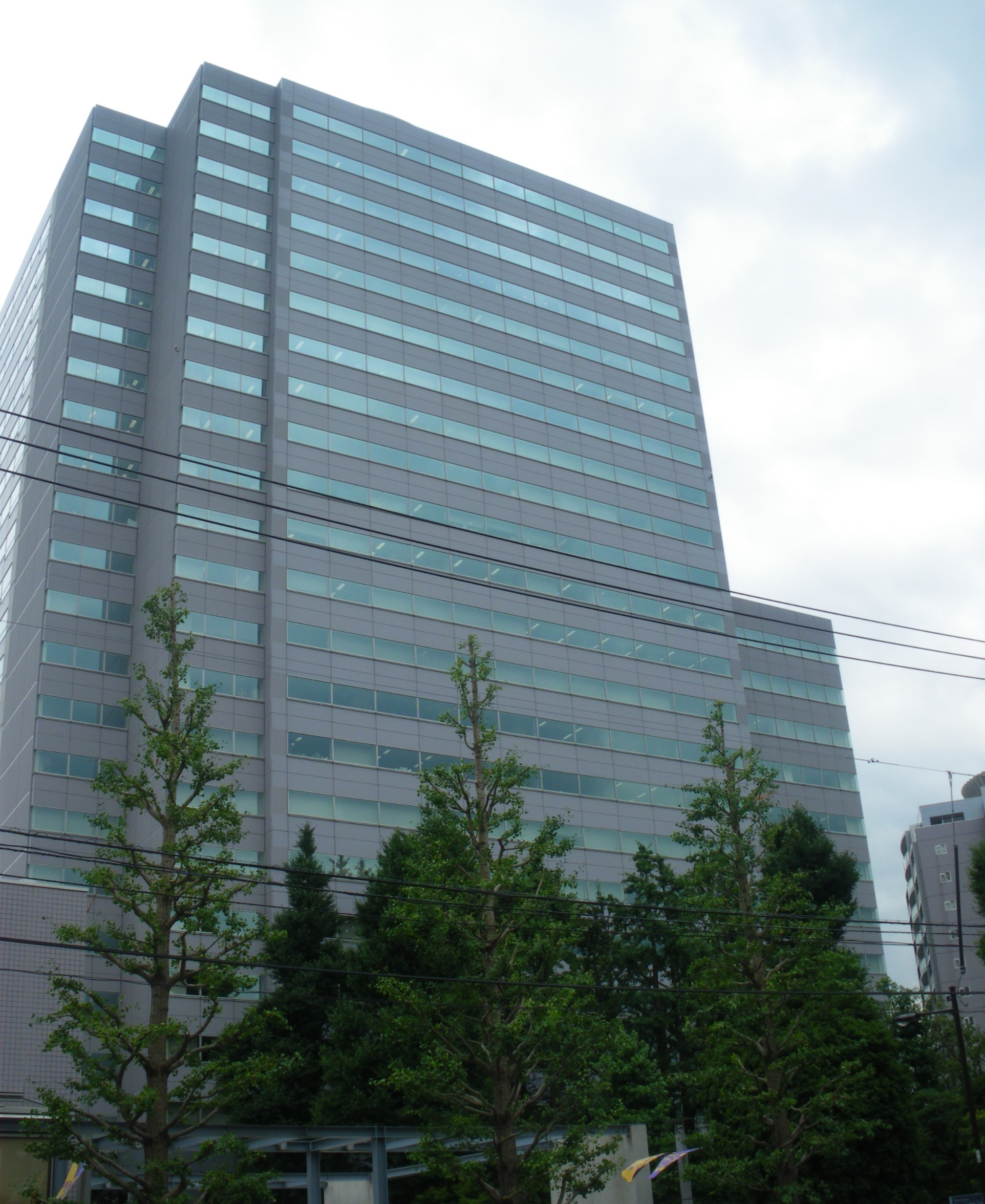
- Pioneer's headquarters in Bunkyō, Tokyo
- Native name: パイオニア株式会社
- Romanized name: Paionia kabushiki gaisha
- Type: Private KK
- Industry: Consumer electronics
- Founded: 1 January 1938; 88 years ago in Tokyo, Japan
- Founder: Nozomu Matsumoto
- Headquarters: Honkomagome, Bunkyō, Tokyo, Japan
- Key people: Shiro Yahara (President＆CEO)
- Products: Car audio and automotive navigation systems, Televisions (CRT Lens and Plasma, former product Smart, Under TCL & Best Buy), PC DVD drives including PC DVD recorders, "set-top" DVD players and DVD recorders, Misc. DJ equipment (sold)
- Revenue: ▼¥365,417 million Yen (2018)
- Operating income: ▼¥1,194 million Yen (2017)
- Net income: ▼¥−7,123 million Yen (2017)
- Owner: CarUX
- Number of employees: 6,651 (2025)
- Parent: InnoLux Corporation
- Website: global.pioneer; global.pioneer/en/info/globalnetwork

Pioneer Corporation (パイオニア株式会社, Paionia Kabushiki-gaisha) is a Japanese multinational corporation based in Tokyo, that specializes in vehicle audio products. It works with optical disc and display technology and software products and is also a manufacturer.

Pioneer played a role in the development of interactive cable TV, the LaserDisc player, the first automotive CD player, the first detachable face car stereo, Supertuner technology, DVD and DVD recording, the first AV receiver with Dolby Digital, plasma display (with the last 2 years of plasma models being branded as Kuro, lauded for their outstanding black levels) and Organic LED display (OLED).

Founded by Nozomu Matsumoto in January 1938 in Tokyo as a radio and speaker repair shop, its current president is Shiro Yahara. For a period of time, the majority of its shares were held by Mitsubishi, while a 3% stake in Pioneer was held by Here B.V., a joint venture of BMW, Volkswagen Group and Daimler AG.

== History ==
Pioneer Corporation traces its origins to 1937, when its founder, Nozomu Matsumoto, developed the A-8 dynamic speaker In January 1938, he established Fukuin Shōkai Denki Seisakusho, Pioneer’s precursor, in Tokyo, which was later incorporated as Fukuin Denki in May 1947. The company introduced the Hi-Fi Speaker PE-8 in December 1953, and in June 1961 changed its name to Pioneer Electronic Corporation. In October that same year, its shares were listed on the Tokyo Stock Exchange Second Section, followed by the introduction of the world’s first separate stereo system in June 1962.

The rest of the 1960s saw Pioneer expanding internationally, with the company establishing sales companies in Europe and the United States in March 1966, and gaining listings on the Tokyo Stock Exchange First Section in February 1968 and Osaka Securities Exchange the next month, as well as on the Amsterdam Stock Exchange (present-day Euronext Amsterdam) in February 1969, when it also began following the US GAAP standards. On November 11, 1970, Pioneer, Warner Bros. Records, and Watanabe Productions established Warner Bros.-Pioneer Corporation, serving as Warner Bros. Records’ Japanese distributor. The company introduced the HiPac cartridge format in August 1971, and a year later, Warner Bros.-Pioneer became Warner-Pioneer Corporation, expanding its distribution to include Atlantic, Reprise, Elektra, and Asylum Records under the WEA group. Pioneer released the RT-1020L reel-to-reel recorder in 1973 and, in November 1975, unveiled the world’s first component car stereo.

The company introduced the Hi-Fi Speaker HPM-100 in 1976, listed shares on the New York Stock Exchange in December 1976, and in December 1977 developed the world’s first two-way addressable CATV system in the U.S. with Warner Cable. The remainder of the 1970s saw further innovation, including the SX-1980 receiver in 1978 and the first industrial LaserDisc player in February 1979, followed by the VP-1000 LaserDisc player for home use in June 1980. In March 1981, Warner-Pioneer established the LaserDisc Corporation in Japan, and by October 1981 Pioneer had introduced home LaserDisc players and 70 software titles in Japan. Over the next few years, it launched the LD karaoke system for business use (October 1982), its first CD player (November 1982), and, in 1984, the world’s first CD/LD combination player and car CD player. The 40-inch projection monitor followed in December 1985.

LaserDisc Corporation was renamed Pioneer LDC in 1989, and in June 1990, Pioneer introduced the world’s first CD-based GPS automotive navigation system. That same year, Warner-Pioneer was dissolved after Warner Music Group acquired Pioneer’s shares and rebranded the subsidiary as Warner Music Japan. Pioneer also invested in Carolco Pictures. In 1992, it opened Pioneer Electronic AsiaCentre Pte. Ltd. in Singapore and released the world’s first 4x CD-ROM changer. The rest of the early 1990s brought several entertainment ventures: Pioneer acquired a 50% stake in Live Entertainment from Carolco in 1993, established Pioneer Corporation in the U.S. as the American division of Pioneer LDC, and wrote off $90 million in Carolco-related losses by April 1995.

In June 1996, Pioneer’s Tokorozawa Plant earned ISO 14001 certification, and the company launched the Pioneer Karaoke Channel via Astro satellite television. It introduced the world’s first DVD/LD/CD player for home use in later that year. Between 1997 and 1999, Pioneer released numerous technological firsts: the DVD-based GPS automotive navigation system, the world’s first DVD-R drive, the first OEL-equipped car audio, and the first 50-inch consumer plasma display. It also updated its corporate logo (1999) and changed its English name to Pioneer Corporation.

Entering the 2000s, Pioneer launched a DVD recorder compatible with DVD-RW in December 1999, listed shares of Tohoku Pioneer in 2000, and introduced a hard-disk GPS system in 2001. That same year, it adopted the global brand slogan “sound.vision.soul.” and continued innovating in navigation and recording technologies. In 2003, Pioneer LDC was acquired by Dentsu and renamed Geneon Entertainment, with its US branch becoming Geneon USA. Pioneer’s recordable DVD drive shipments surpassed five million units worldwide, and in 2004, it launched the DVJ-X1, the first DVD player for professional DJs and VJs, as well as the DVR-108, the first 16x DVD burner. That same year, Pioneer Plasma Display Corporation (formerly NEC Plasma Display Corporation) began operations.

In 2006, following financial difficulties, President Kaneo Ito and Chairman Kanya Matsumoto resigned, with Tamihiko Sudo appointed president. The company showcased ultra-thin plasma concepts in 2007, developed a 16-layer 400GB Blu-ray Disc in 2008, and moved its headquarters from Tokyo to Kawasaki in 2009, while unveiling the CDJ-900 and CDJ-2000 DJ players.

On June 25, 2009, Sharp Corporation agreed to form a joint venture on their optical business to be called Pioneer Digital Design and Manufacturing Corporation. In 2010, Pioneer exited the TV business and launched DJ controllers such as the DDJ-S1 and DDJ-T1, followed by additional models in 2011.

The rest of the 2010s saw Pioneer continuing to innovate in navigation and DJ technology. It introduced the Cyber Navi AR-HUD augmented-reality system (2012), wireless DJ system like the XDJ-AERO, and the DJM-750 mixer (2013).

In 2014, in addition to agreeing to sell Pioneer Home Electronics (Home A/V) to Onkyo in September, it sold its DJ equipment business to private equity firm KKR for 59 billion yen (or US$550 million), which ultimately established a separate and independent entity from Pioneer called Pioneer DJ.

In 2018, two years after Pioneer returned to having its headquarters in Tokyo, Baring Private Equity Asia injected 60 billion yen (or US$540 million) to help resolve Pioneer’s debt. Around April, TCL began manufacturing televisions under the Pioneer and Onkyo brands after acquiring the license to do so in all countries outside of Japan; now the TVs have Xumo built in.

In 2019, Pioneer delisted from the Tokyo Stock Exchange to pursue restructuring. A major supply chain disruption occurred in October 2020 after a fire destroyed AKM’s semiconductor factory—one of Pioneer’s key component suppliers—leading to prolonged replacement delays and criticism over warranty compliance. Despite this, Pioneer continued to release new products, including an in-car Wi-Fi router in December 2020, and partnered with Cerence in 2021 to develop conversational AI systems.

In June 2021, Voxx International announced that it had finalized a licensing agreement with the Pioneer and Pioneer Elite brands "for all markets, except China" as part of their acquisition of Onkyo. The licensing agreement ended on July 17, 2025. In May 2025, Pioneer announced its withdrawal from the optical disc drive business, marking the end of an era for one of the company’s original product lines.

On December 1, 2025, it was announced that the company had been acquired by CarUX, a subsidiary of the Taiwanese electronics manufacturer InnoLux Corporation.

== Brands and devices ==
Pioneer logo (1969–1998)

- Pioneer – car electronics
- Pioneer Elite produces premium electronics that are usually higher in quality and price. Most Pioneer Elite branded electronics have the gloss black "Urushi" finish.
  Pioneer Elite products include AVRs, Laserdisc players, CD players, DVD players, plasma computer monitors and televisions [Now discontinued], and rear-projection televisions. Pioneer Elite debuted its first Blu-ray Disc player, the BDP-HD1, in January 2007. Pioneer released the first 1080p plasma display, the PRO-FHD1.
  In Summer of 2007, Pioneer released the Kuro line of plasma displays, that the company claims has the best black levels of any flat panel display which leads to greater contrast, and more realistic images. Kuro means black in Japanese.
- Pioneer Cycle Sport – GPS bicycle computers and single/dual-sided crankset-based power meters.
- Carrozzeria (Japan only) – car electronics
- Pioneer Premier (North America only) – high-end car electronics [Now discontinued]
- TAD – Technical Audio Devices. Primarily noted as a manufacturer of high-efficiency audio loudspeaker components and complete speaker systems for the commercial sound reinforcement and recording studio markets. The base for US operations is located in southern California, with limited design/manufacturing done on site. Operations commenced in the early 1980s and continue to this day with a limited offering of speaker components and expanded the offering of consumer speakers and electronics.
- Pioneer DJ – DJ equipment. A 85.05 percent majority stake of the brand was sold to private equity firm KKR in 2015 for 59 billion yen ($551 million), but KKR resold it yet again to photo processing machine manufacturer Noritsu in March 2020 for 35 billion yen ($324.9 million).
- Pioneer Premium Audio- a brand of factory-installed OEM premium sound systems for GM vehicles: Chevrolet Cobalt, Chevrolet Cruze, Chevrolet Malibu, Chevrolet Equinox, GMC Terrain, Pontiac G5, and Pontiac Torrent as seven-speaker premium sound systems, and a premium sound system for the Ford Ranger, Honda Ridgeline, and Mazda B-Series compact pickup trucks.

Current logo used since 1999

Pioneer also supplies genuine audio equipments and head units installed for Daihatsu automobiles marketed in Indonesia since the launch of Daihatsu Xenia in 2004.

== Pioneer Karaoke Channel ==
Pioneer Karaoke Channel 先鋒卡拉OK頻道
- Country: Malaysia
- Broadcast area: Nationwide
- Network: Pioneer Corporation (Japan); Astro (Malaysia)
- Headquarters: Kuala Lumpur

Programming
- Languages: Teochew; Chinese; Cantonese; Taiwanese
- Picture format: SDTV (480i 4:3); PAL (576i 4:3)

Ownership
- Owner: Pioneer Corporation (Japan); Astro (Malaysia)

History
- Launched: January 1996

Pioneer Karaoke Channel (Chinese: 先鋒卡拉OK頻道; pinyin: Xiān Fēng Kǎ Lā OK Pín Dào) is a satellite television channel that features Asian music videos and karaoke 24 hours a day. Pioneer and Malaysian satellite broadcaster Astro officially launched on 1 June 1996.

== Subsidiary ==
- Sanken Argadwija (Sanken Electronics Indonesia)
- Vitron Electronic Industry (Vitron Electronics Indonesia)

== Devices ==
- The GPS device Pioneer Avic, includes TMC features.

=== Receivers ===
1970

- SX‑1500TD
- SX‑2500

1971

- SX-440
- SX-770
- SX-990

1972

- SX-424
- SX-525
- SX-626
- SX-727
- SX-828

1973

- QX-949
- QX-949A (quad)
- QX-747 (quad)

1974

- SX‑535
- SX‑636
- SX‑737
- SX‑838

1975

- SX‑450
- SX‑550
- SX‑650
- SX‑750
- SX‑850
- SX‑950
- SX‑1050
- SX‑1250

1977

- SX-580
- SX-680
- SX-780
- SX-880
- SX-980
- SX-1080
- SX-1280
- SX‑1980

1979

- SX‑3400
- SX‑3500
- SX‑3600
- SX‑3700
- SX‑3800
- SX‑3900

1980

- SX‑D5000
- SX‑D7000

1981

- SX‑4
- SX‑6
- SX‑7
- SX‑8

1982

- SX‑9
- SX‑300
- SX‑600
- SX‑900

1983

- SX‑50
- SX‑60
- SX‑80

1984

- SX‑20
- SX‑20DAB

1985

- SX‑202
- SX‑212
- SX‑221R

1986

- SX‑203RDS
- SX‑205RDS
- SX‑209RDS

1990

- VSX-4500S
- VSX-5700S
- VSX-9700S

1991

- VSX-D1S
- VSX-5900S

1992

- VSX-D901S
- VSX-D701S

1993

- VSX-D2S
- VSX-502

1994

- Elite VSX-99
- VSX-D903S
- VSX-453

1995

- VSX-454
- VSX-505S

1996

- VSX-305
- Elite VSX-59

1997

- VSX-D906S

1998

- VSX-D608

1999

- Elite VSX-24TX

=== Optical drives ===
- BDR-X13U-S
- BDR-X13UBK
- BDR-XD08UMB-S
- BDR-XD08B
- BDR-XD08S
- BDR-XD08G
- BDR-XS07UHD
- BDR-XS07S
- BDR-S13U-X
- BDR-S13UBK
- BDR-2213
- BDR-212DBK
- BDR-209MBK

Pioneer is one of the major vendors of optical drives.

==== Operation modes ====
More recent optical drives allow the user to specify different operation modes using bundled software:

- "Entertainment Mode” – Reduction of acoustic drive noise
- "High-performance Mode" – Prioritizes reading and writing speeds
- “Quality Mode” – Prioritizes reading and writing accuracy
- “Eco Mode” – Minimizes power consumption

== See also ==
- Car audio
- CDJ
- Automotive navigation system
- List of Japanese companies
- List of phonograph manufacturers
- Geneon (formerly Pioneer LDC)
- DVJ-X1
- List of music software
- List of studio monitor manufacturers

== Sources ==
- Pioneer HPM-100, Advertisement. 1976: 1-4.
- 40-inch Projection Monitor has been seen in Switzerland on second hand sales
