= DJM =

Range of DJ mixers

DJM is a range of DJ mixers made by Pioneer DJ.

Mixers in the DJM series include the DJM-300, DJM-350, DJM-400, DJM-450, DJM-500, DJM-600, DJM-700, DJM-750, DJM-707, DJM-800, DJM-850, DJM-900 Nexus, DJM-900 Nexus 2, DJM-A9, DJM-V10, DJM-909, DJM-1000 and the DJM-2000. They also have many cueing facilities and effects that can be applied to any channel, in conjunction with the CDJ range of CD players made by Pioneer, with the control wire plugged in between mixer and CDJ-type CD player, so that either can be started/stopped remotely by the other (Relay Play) or with the so-called 'Fader Start' of the mixer.

Key feature for Pioneer is the BPM tempo synchronised sound effects section (world first) and VU meter for each channel. The DJM-909 was the world's first mixer with a LCD Touch sensitive control.

The mixers of the latest digital generation all have 32-bit DSPs so, they have much better sound quality.

== Models ==
Digital Processing Models : DJM-250, DJM-350, DJM-400, DJM-450, DJM-700, DJM-750, DJM-800, DJM-850, DJM-900NXS, DJM-900SRT, DJM-1000, DJM-2000NXS, DJM-900NXS2

Analog Processing Models : DJM-300, DJM-500, DJM-600*, DJM-707, and DJM-909*

"*" = While the FX on these units are digital, the unprocessed signal from the playback device, i.e. turntables, will remain analog throughout.

== 2020s ==
- DJM-A9 (Digital Processing Model) - 2023
