= Minilab =

Photographic film developing and printing system

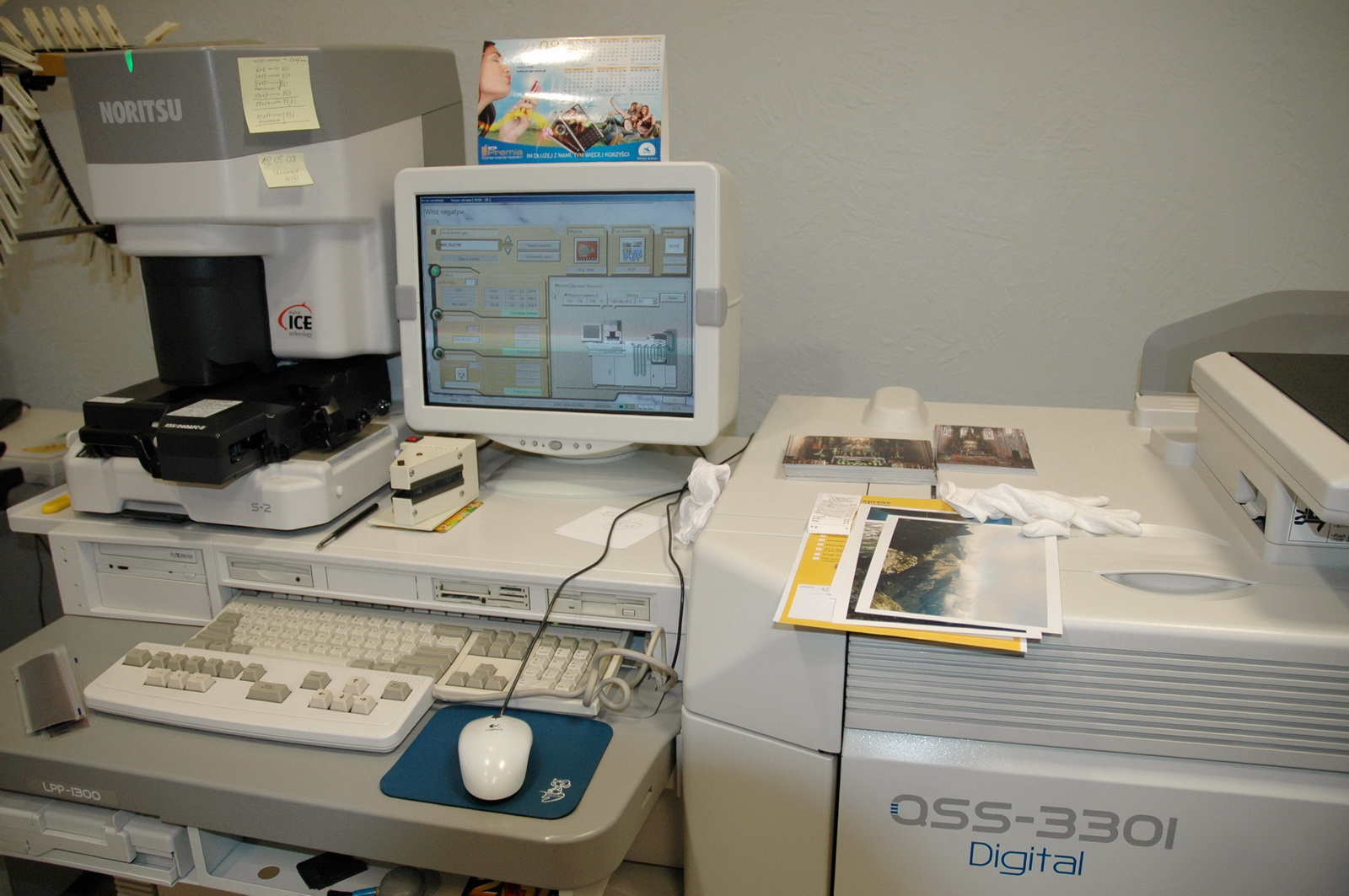
A Noritsu QSS-3301 digital minilab printer. To the left of the monitor is a separate film scanner that is on top of the minilab, but can also be placed anywhere close to it. It sends images from film into the computer through cables. Digital minilab printers have a computer and computer monitor that handle the images before printing, and controls the minilab

A minilab is a small photographic developing and printing system or machine, as opposed to large centralized photo developing labs. Many retail stores use film or digital minilabs to provide on-site photo finishing services.

With the increase in popularity of digital photography, the demand for film development has decreased. This means that the larger labs capable of processing 30,000-40,000 films a day are going out of business, and more retailers are installing minilabs.

In Kodak and Agfa minilabs, films are processed using C41b chemistry and the paper is processed using RA-4. With these chemical processes, films can be ready for collection in as little as 20 minutes, depending on the machine capabilities and the operator.

A typical minilab consists of two machines, a film processor and a paper printer/processor. In some installations, these two components are integrated into a single machine. In addition, some digital minilabs are also equipped with photo-ordering kiosks.

Despite their small size, minilab machines may use chemical processing just like larger dedicated photo processing labs, using processes such as CP-49E or RA-4 for photographic paper processing, and C-41 for film processing. All necessary processing chemicals may arrive in a box (replenishment cartridge) containing enough bleach, developer and fixing agents to be mixed automatically for an estimated amount of paper, eliminating the need to manually handle and mix chemicals. Minilab machines were used in stores to perform film processing and printing in a short period of time, usually less than one hour from start of film development to the end of printing, partly because it eliminated the need to send rolls of film and printed photos to and from a large central photo processing lab.

== Film processor ==
35 mm films are pulled, this means all of the film is extracted from its roll. This can be done manually or by using a small machine that essentially uses tape to pull the film leader and all of the film out of the cassette. This small machine may be integrated into the film processor. If so, rolls are inserted inside a chamber, slot side towards the inside of the machine pointing downwards at an angle of 45°, the chamber is closed and the film inside the rolls is pulled into the processing mechanism. In cases when the end of the film cannot be removed or if the film is damaged, the film can be removed using a dark bag or a dark box. Before processing, a twin check number (a pair of stickers with a unique number) is manually put onto the film and the matching number onto the film processing envelope, so that after processing this film can be easily identified to the customer's envelope. Films are spliced on the leader cards one or two at a time, to do this the end of the film is cut square, special chemical-resistant tape is used to attach the film to the leader card. The leader cards are then inserted into the film processor mechanism and are fed through the machine using sprockets in the card. The film goes through a developer, bleach, fix and stabilizer, then through a dryer. After the film is processed it is cut from the leader card and reunited with the processing envelope containing the customer details, and then from here the film goes forward for printing. Alternatively the film may be used immediately to expose silver halide photographic paper, shining a bright light through the film and onto the paper using lenses for optical enlargement, which is then processed like film in a separate mechanism. Or the film may be digitally scanned using a CCD image sensor, corrected using software, and sent to a digital silver halide printer.

A minilab is typically a roller transport processor, where the film follows a serpentine path over many rollers. Each chemical processing step is done using a chemical immersion tank with replenishment to keep the chemicals fresh. Film advances down into the tank and then turns and rises up and out, then advances down into the next tank, and so forth. Chemical exposure timing is a combination of film advance speed and the physical length of the serpentine film path immersed in the fluid. The fluid in the tanks is usually agitated, filtered and warmed to 100 °F (necessary for the C-41 process), and the fluid also needs periodic replacement. The Film processor also has a dryer, just like wet silver halide printers.

A single minilab can be built to allow many different film widths in one device, from APS films to professional wide format films, using a flexible leader to pull the film through the mechanism. The leader is as wide as the widest possible format, and films attached to it are supported by guide rollers only. The leader may be gripped on each side between toothed drive belts following the same path as the film through the mechanism.

An example of a film processor minilab is the Noritsu QSF series of machines.

== Photo printer ==
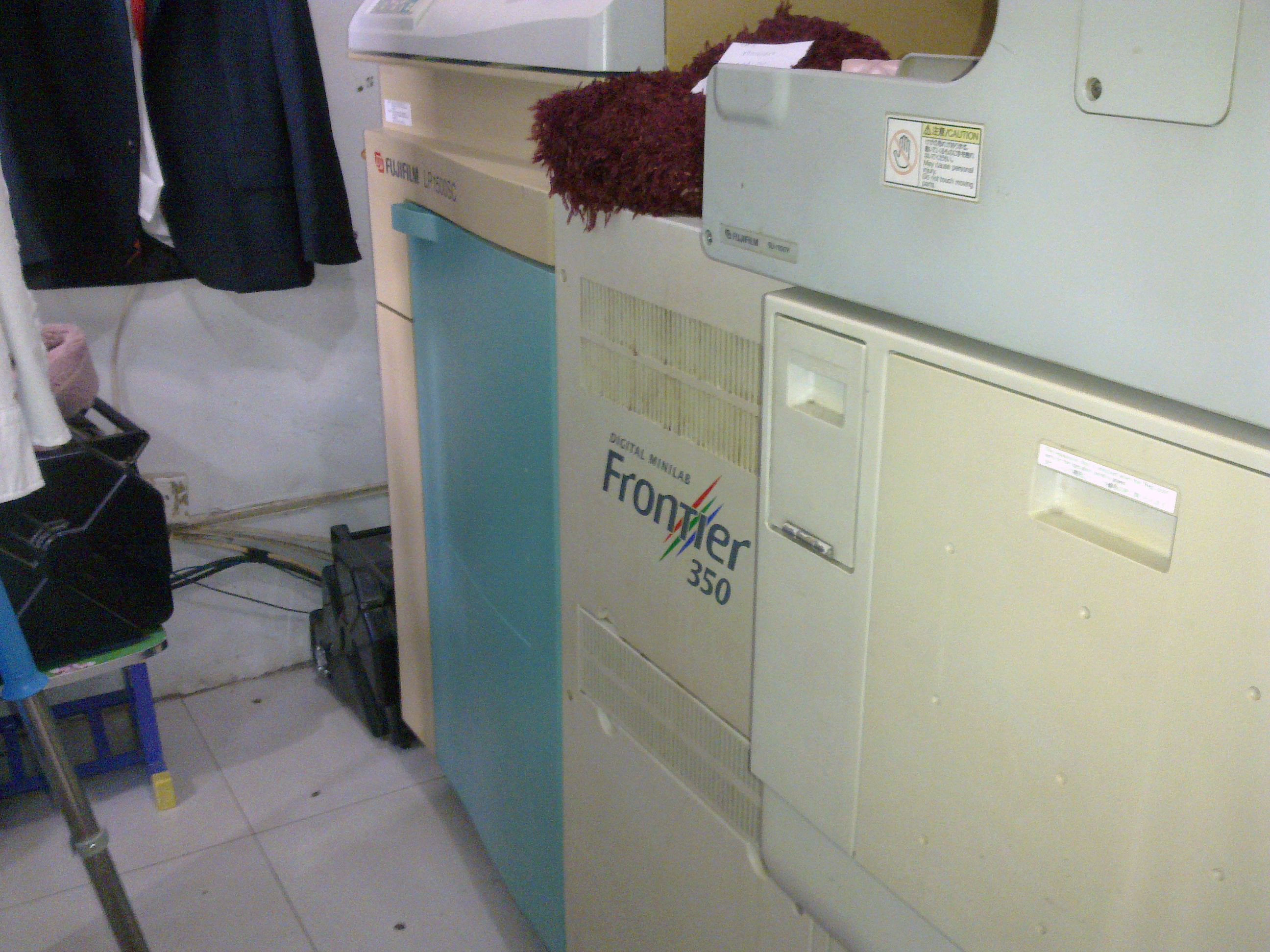
Fujifilm silver halide photo printer minilab

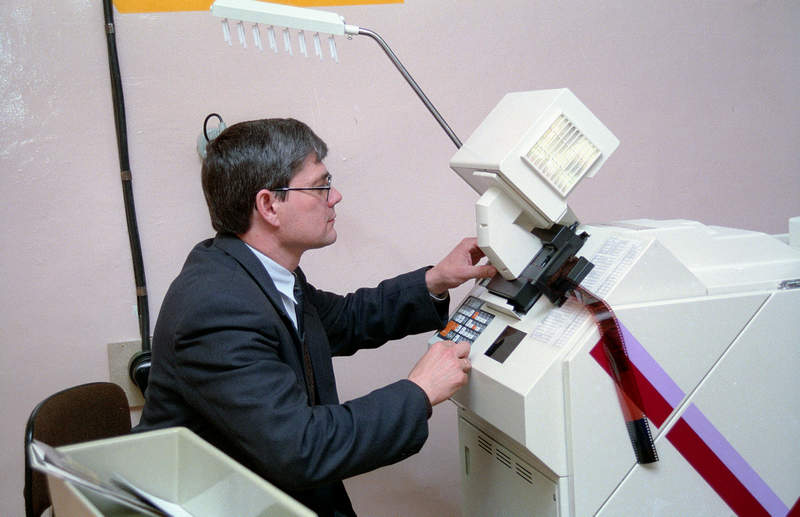
An analog printer minilab receiving film. No computer is present, and the film "scanner" is mounted on and integrated with the minilab so it can not be moved separately to somewhere else and connected through cables, the "scanner" is actually an optical enlarger, however there are digital minilabs with integrated scanners

Most printer/processes are computer controlled. The front of the film is fed into the printing gate. Sensors see the film and forward the film to the first frame. DX codes on the edge of the film are read by the printer and the film channel is selected accordingly to give the optimum result.

The paper stock is usually a continuous roll which is cut according to the size requirements of the customer. Different image widths are handled using different roll widths, and each width is usually done as a batch process of images all the same size. The light-sensitive photographic paper stock can be contained within light-tight packaging so that the minilab operator only needs to remove the old empty paper container and insert a full one, without needing to darken the room to prevent paper exposure.

Each frame is printed one at a time, the photographic paper is advanced each time and when there are sufficient frames printed the paper automatically advances into the paper processor. The paper passes through a developer, bleach/fix, a wash, and dryer. The prints are then cut up and are collected in a bundle. From here a smaller machine is used to cut the negatives into fours and sleeved to protect them. An intermediate step that conditions the paper using conditioning chemicals may be carried out on the paper before it is dried.

Older minilab printers are analog (optical) and directly expose the paper by shining light through the film and into the paper using an optical enlarger, before developing the paper. Newer minilab printers are digital and first scan the film, whose pictures may then be digitally corrected before being sent off to the printer, which may either expose the paper using lasers and then develop the paper, or be "dry" and essentially be a large inkjet printer. Those that develop the paper are known as Silver halide printers or minilabs. Dry inkjet minilabs are slower than their wet silver halide counterparts but consume less power, in part because dry minilabs do not need power to keep the development chemicals warm. Some minilabs may use light valves instead of lasers.

Printing is carried out using a photographic printing process that uses modulated red, green and blue laser beams (channels) to directly expose the photographic paper. The laser beams are often controlled (modulated) individually from one another using their own acousto-optical modulator (AOM) crystal, each of which is driven by its own AOM driver. The AOM driver can often fail causing problems in the image produced by the printing process. Many minilabs use DPSS lasers while others use laser diodes to generate the laser beams, or may use both. The printer may also print information onto the back of the paper for identification. Alternatively the laser beams may be modulated directly by varying the power sent to the laser diodes. Often the green and blue lasers are DPSS lasers. Lenses, diaphragms and mirrors are used to ensure that the laser beams are round and converged to ensure that the exposed image is in focus.

Light bleeding or other problems may occur when using this process; Light bleeding results in color fringing. Light bleeding occurs due excessive amounts of laser light during exposure. Due to this Minilabs may use a variant of Grey Component Removal (GCR) to minimize exposure to laser light when printing shadows but not when printing solid colors. This printing process may need regular calibration to achieve the best possible results.

Calibration may be performed using a stored profile that may vary depending on things such as the type of paper on the printer or with a calibrator, and the printer may also apply some form of color management. Printers making use of this process can make prints of images that have been scanned using the printer's built-in CCD scanner, images that are in CDs, 3.25 inch floppy disks, ZIP disks or memory cards. More recent (~2005) minilabs may also function as network printers.

Digital wet laser minilabs work in the following way: The paper is pulled from a light-tight box called a "magazine" containing a roll of paper and cut into sheets, or sheet paper may be used. After cutting an inkjet printer marks each sheet with up to 80 characters of information spread over 2 lines, before exposure using a scanning and modulated set of red, green and blue laser beams. After exposure by lasers, the paper passes through tanks, one containing a developer, the next a bleach/fixing agent (which may also be separate) and the next containing filtered rinsing water followed by tanks with conditioning chemicals, before being dried with hot air, ejected and sorted. The chemicals may be automatically mixed from a cardboard box containing the necessary chemicals in separate bottles. The minilab contains filters and heaters for the chemicals, and it discards used chemicals into a separate, single bottle. Minilabs may contain 2 or 4 magazines, each with a paper roll of different width. The laser beams are scanned across the paper using a rotating mirror octagon driven by a stepper motor. Each full rotation of the octagon exposes 8 lines on the paper. Sensors are used to synchronize the rotation of the octagon with the signals sent by the AOM drivers to modulate the lasers. The lasers and AOMs are inside a dust-tight enclosure. Dust outside the output window of the enclosure can affect image quality. The lasers may be heated and their temperature monitored.

The final job is to put the negatives with the prints into a wallet and into the processing envelope. The order is then priced and placed into a rack or drawer waiting for the customer to collect.

Some minilabs have trays that move down; as the prints are made they are ejected from the machine; then a conveyor belt moves the prints sideways towards the tray, depositing them onto it. As soon as the tray has all the prints it needs it moves down and then an empty one drops on top of it, and the process repeats. This can be used to categorize prints, so that all prints belonging to an order are together. Other minilabs may use other mechanisms to categorize prints. This mechanism is called a sorter. Each tray has all the contents of a single order.

An example of a digital minilab silver halide printer is the Noritsu QSS series of machines.

== History ==
The first minilab, the QSS-1 (Quick Service System 1) was introduced by Noritsu in 1976. In 1979 Noritsu released the QSS-2, which for the first time allowed for photo processing, from film development to color printing in just 45 minutes. In 2002 Noritsu introduced the first dry minilab, using Epson's seven color inkjet piezoelectric printing head. It was significantly cheaper than its "wet" silver halide counterparts. In 1996 Fujifilm released the first digital minilab, the Frontier 1000.

Analog silver halide minilabs were replaced by digital laser silver halide minilabs, which were replaced by dry inkjet minilabs. Dry minilabs used to be more expensive to run than their wet counterparts, but that situation reversed in 2013.

By the end of 2005, two manufacturers, Agfa and Konica went out of business. Minilab Factory GmbH took over the renowned minilab branch of Agfa in 2006. Gretag Imaging, not to be confused with former Gretag Macbeth, went bankrupt in December, 2002. Subsequently, the minilab-related assets were sold to the newly formed San Marco Imaging. The wholesale-lab-related assets were sold to KIS Photo Me Group. In 2006, Noritsu and Fuji announced a strategic alliance. Noritsu were for a short time manufacturing all of Fuji's minilab equipment until they discontinued production. Fujifilm resumed production of the Frontier LP5700R and this remains available as of Dec 2017. Fujifilm's inkjet minilab or dry lab products are sourced from Noritsu and increasingly from Epson who also supplies the older type print head to Noritsu.

== Digital minilab ==
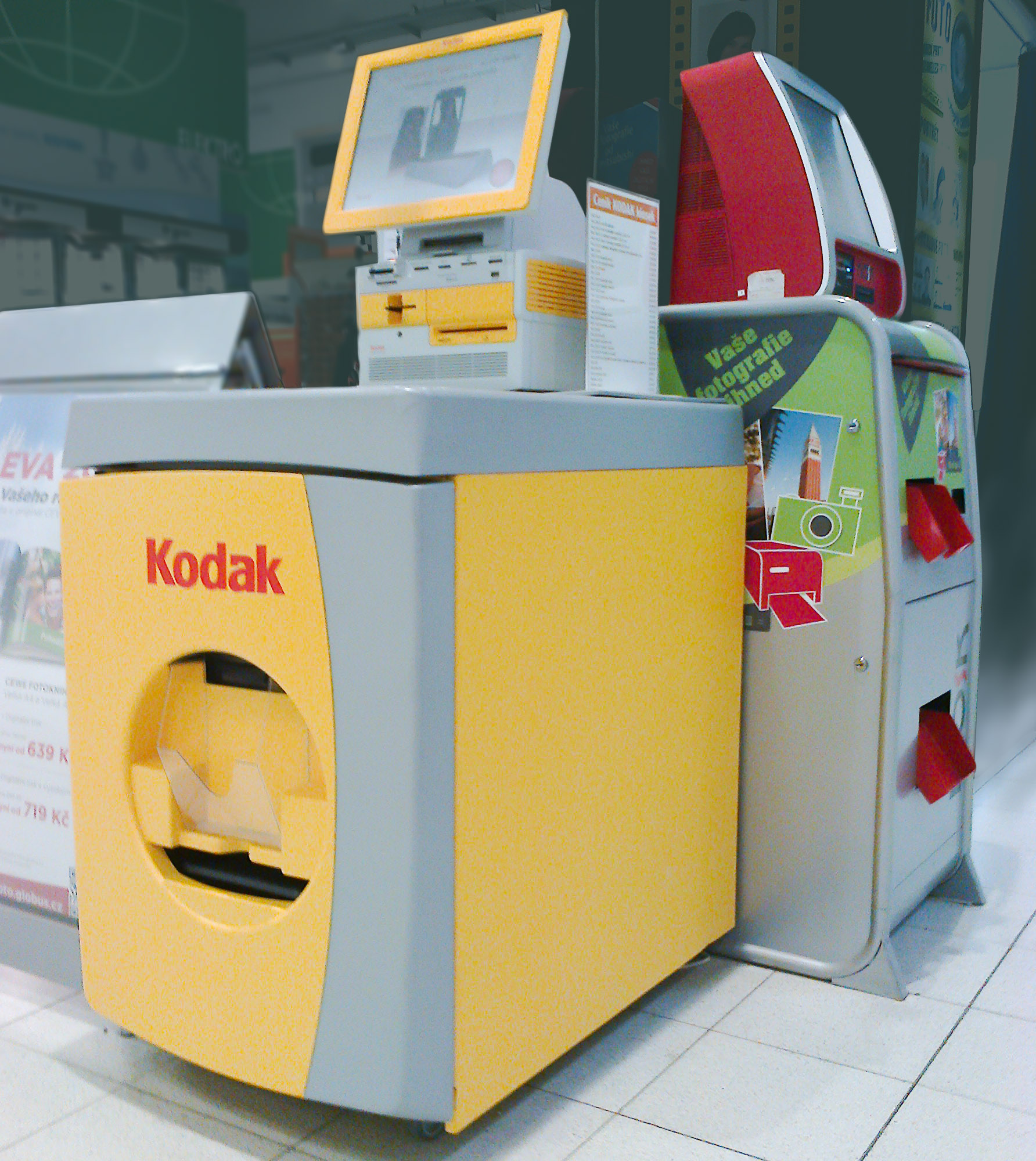
Dry minilabs

A digital minilab is a computer printer that uses traditional chemical photographic processes to make prints from digital images. Photographs are input to the digital minilab using a built-in film scanner that captures images from negative and positive photographic films (including mounted slides), flatbed scanners, a kiosk that accepts CD-ROMs or memory cards from a digital camera, or a website that accepts uploads. The operator can make many corrections such as brightness or color saturation, contrast, scene lighting color correction, sharpness and cropping. A set of scanning and modulated laser beams, LCD/LED, or Micro Light Valve Array (MLVA) then exposes photographic paper with the image, which is then processed by the minilab just as if it had been exposed from a negative.

The price of a digital minilab can reach up to $250,000 USD. A minilab, such as a Doli DL 1210 has a print resolution of 520dpi, accepts BMP, JPEG, and TIFF formats, and can print up to 8in by 12in. The most popular brands include KIS, Noritsu, Doli, and Fuji.

Digital minilabs are generally too expensive for typical home use, but many retailers purchase or lease them to offer photo printing services to their customers. The resulting photographs have the same quality and durability as traditional photographs since the same chemical processes (e.g. RA-4) are used. This is often better than can be achieved by typical home inkjet printers, and for smaller prints generally less expensive.

A new type of minilab is the dry lab, which does not require the use of developer or fixer chemicals, and does not require moistening and then drying of the print. These machines are cheaper, smaller, and use inkjet printing instead of a chemical developing process. This allows them to be installed in smaller retail stores, print shops, and resort/tourist locations that could not justify an expensive, high throughput, wet minilab. Standard questions of inkjet quality and longevity apply.

== Dry minilab ==
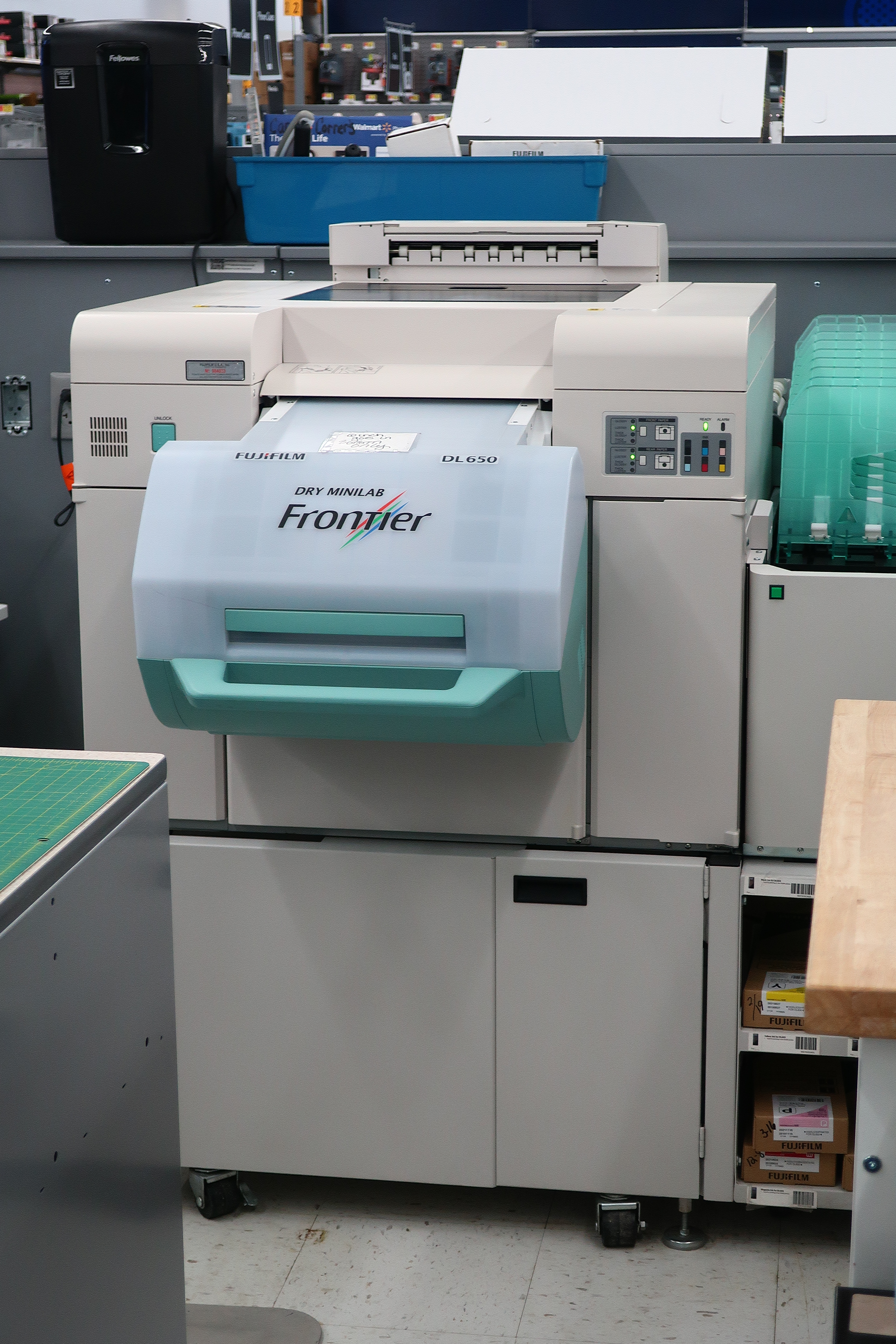
A Fujifilm Frontier DL650 Pro dry minilab

"Dry lab" is a term that evolved in the professional and consumer segments of the photo printing industry to distinguish later, chemistry free (or "dry") photo printing systems from traditional, silver halide (or "wet") systems.

There are currently two technologies used by manufacturers as print engines for either professional or commercial "dry labs". Although not strictly "dry", the first technology is a dye-based, four-colour (cyan, magenta, yellow, black) inkjet system. Inkjet-based dry labs output prints with a relatively wide colour gamut although colours may take a few hours to stabilise after printing while the ink fully dries. The second technology that can be used is "dye diffusion thermal transfer" or D2T2 technology. D2T2 is a three-colour (cyan, magenta, yellow) thermal process whereby the colour dyes are transferred from an ink ribbon into the surface of a special paper substrate. "Dry labs" are becoming increasingly popular with users as they are cheaper and easier to maintain than wet labs.

== See also ==
- Photographic printing
- Photographic paper
- Photography
- Image editing
