= Pioneer Kuro =

Brand name of Pioneer Corporation's plasma televisions

Kuro (from Japanese 黒 meaning black) was the brand name that Pioneer Corporation used for its line of high-definition plasma televisions (PDP) from 2007 to 2009. Although Pioneer had been a long time maker of plasmas (dating back to 1997) and were fully invested in the PDP technology, they generally did not market the sets under a sub-brand until the creation of Kuro. While critically successful, sales of the Kuro line were not as good as expected and Pioneer decided to both discontinue Kuro and exit the TV manufacturing business entirely. Despite the discontinuation of production, used Kuro TVs have a cult following on the secondary market.

== History ==
The Kuro was introduced first in August 2007.

At the 2008 Consumer Electronics Show, Pioneer unveiled its "Ultimate Black" Kuro. The Kuro's plasma technology reduces light emissions from black areas of the screen to such a degree that at its maximum brightness, the contrast ratio was considered “almost infinite”. Hard-core home theater enthusiasts and home cinema aficionados stated that the Kuro was the only HDTV to achieve the "true black". Reviewers said that the Kuro represented the best-in-class technology, as its images were the most vibrant and colorful of any HDTV at the time, whether LCD, LED-LCD, or plasma. Sony had unveiled the XEL-1 OLED display which has even better contrast than the Kuro including darker blacks; however at that stage OLED technology was still plagued by reliability and lifespan issues.

Despite being critically acclaimed, the Kuro was commercially unsuccessful. Plasma TVs had peaked in popularity from 2004 to 2006 and had been steadily losing ground to LCD TVs ever since. Pioneer was particularly hurt by this shift as the Kuro was positioned as a premium HDTV, being generally more expensive than the mass market Panasonic Viera plasma, while other plasma display manufacturers like Samsung and LG had demoted their plasmas to the low end. There were no Kuros to compete at the mainstream or low-end segments, which were dominated by LCDs.

Pioneer announced in February 2009 that they would exit the TV business by March 2010 to concentrate on car and audio/visual systems. Pioneer has since sold many of the Kuro's patents to Panasonic, the only other significant television manufacturer that concentrated on plasmas, and many of the Panasonic Viera plasma panels made after that point utilize the Kuro's technologies.

In October 2013, Panasonic announced that it would stop producing plasma display TVs, closing the plasma panel production factory in December 2013 and ending sales in March 2014. Plasma displays have been losing market share every year to LCDs, and Panasonic has been posting losses and cutting jobs in the last few years. Plasma TV technology was slow to make the transition from 720p to 1080p, and did not reach 4K when major manufacturers discontinued production.
