= Appalachian State–Georgia Southern football rivalry =

College football rivalry

Deeper Than Hate
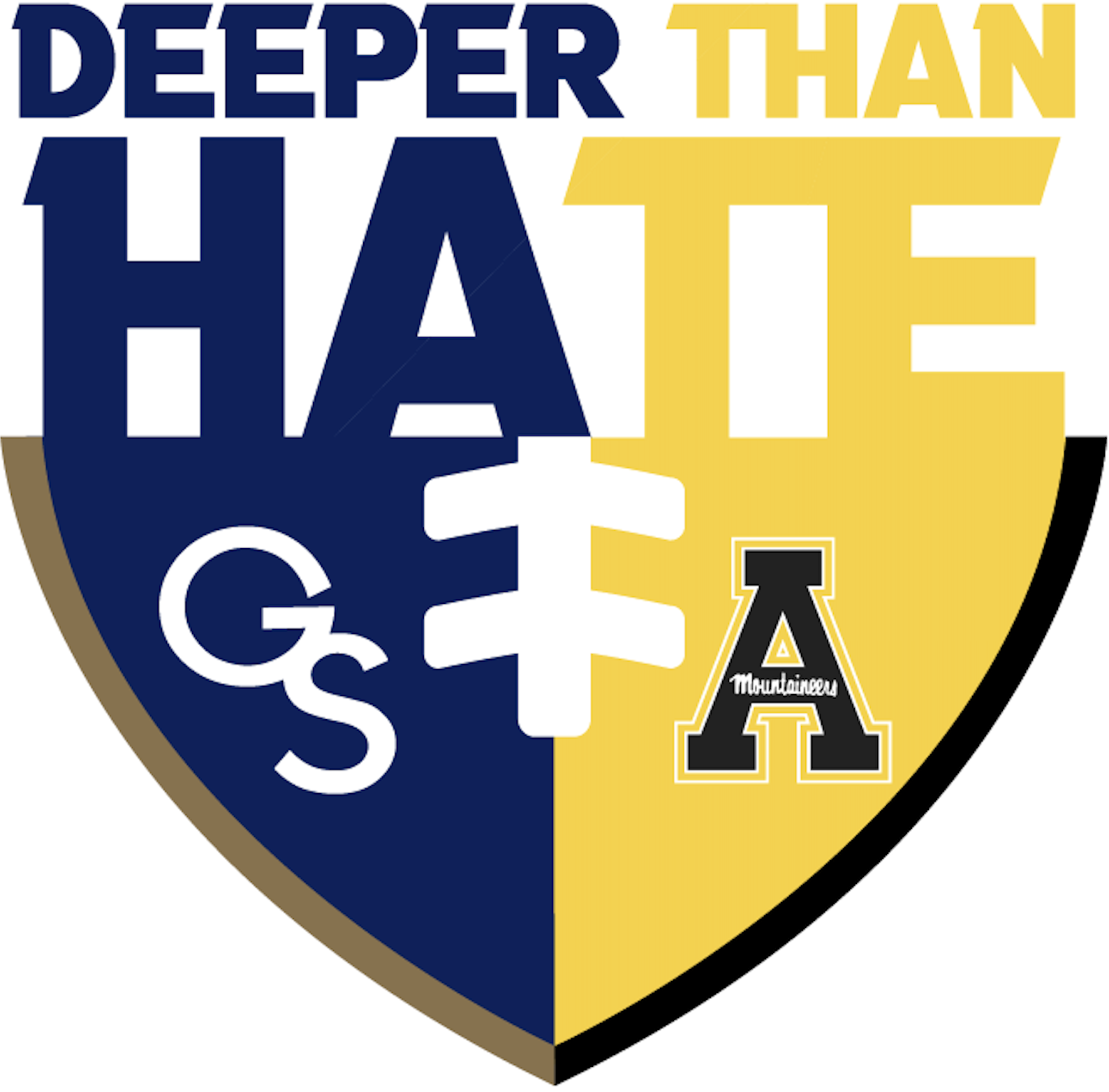

- Appalachian State Mountaineers Georgia Southern Eagles
- First meeting: November 25, 1932; South Georgia Teachers, 33–0
- Latest meeting: October 31, 2026; Georgia Southern, 19–3
- Next meeting: 2027

Statistics
- Total meetings: 42
- All-time series: Appalachian State leads, 21–20–1
- Largest victory: Appalachian State, 59–0 (1939)
- Longest win streak: Georgia Southern, 4 (2000–2002), (2024–present)
- Current win streak: Georgia Southern, 4 (2024–present)

The Appalachian State–Georgia Southern football rivalry, also known as Deeper Than Hate, is a college rivalry between the Mountaineers of Appalachian State University in Boone, North Carolina, and the Eagles of Georgia Southern University in Statesboro, Georgia.

Appalachian State leads the all-time series, 21–20–1. The rivalry has been played annually since 1993, when Georgia Southern joined Appalachian State in the Southern Conference; before both programs joined the Sun Belt (and the FBS) in 2014.

== History ==
Locations of Appalachian State and Georgia Southern

Despite being located in separate states, the two universities have similar academic profiles, both having developed from teachers' colleges, and being prominent regional universities in the South. In addition, both Appalachian and Georgia Southern historically held a very strong presence during their time in the Division I Football Championship Subdivision (FCS), having combined to win nine national championships, four Walter Payton Awards, and two Buck Buchanan Awards. On March 27, 2013, both schools were invited to join the Sun Belt Conference of the Football Bowl Subdivision (FBS) beginning in 2014.

Georgia Southern's football program began in 1924 while the program at Appalachian began in 1928. The Eagles and Mountaineers first met in 1932, with South Georgia Teachers College beating Appalachian State Teachers College 33–0. In 1941, Georgia Southern discontinued its football program, and it wasn't until 1982 before the Eagles again took the field. The makings of the rivalry truly began when the Mountaineers beat the Eagles in the quarterfinals of the 1987 I-AA Playoffs. Georgia Southern returned the favor in 2001.

In December 2025, Georgia Southern and Appalachian State were selected to face one another in the 2025 JLab Birmingham Bowl. This is the first time the schools have played a post season game against one another since moving up to the Football Bowl Subdivision (FBS). It is also the first time the rivalry game has been played outside of Statesboro, Georgia, or Boone, North Carolina.

== Game results ==
Appalachian State victories	Georgia Southern victories	Tie games

No.	Date	Location	Winner	Score
1	November 25, 1932	Statesboro, GA	South Georgia Teachers	33–0
2	October 26, 1934	Statesboro, GA	South Georgia Teachers	22–13
3	November 9, 1935	Boone, NC	Tie	0–0
4	October 24, 1936	Boone, NC	Appalachian State Teachers	27–0
5	November 17, 1939	Boone, NC	Appalachian State Teachers	59–0
6	December 5, 1987 (Note: The December 5, 1987, and December 8, 2001, games took place in the NCAA Division I-AA Playoff Quarterfinals.)	Boone, NC	Appalachian State	19–0
7	October 16, 1993	Boone, NC	Georgia Southern	34–28
8	October 15, 1994	Statesboro, GA	Georgia Southern	34–31
9	October 14, 1995	Boone, NC	Appalachian State	27–17
10	October 19, 1996	Statesboro, GA	Appalachian State	35–28
11	October 18, 1997	Boone, NC	Appalachian State	24–12
12	October 17, 1998	Statesboro, GA	Georgia Southern	37–24
13	October 16, 1999	Boone, NC	Appalachian State	17–16
14	October 14, 2000	Statesboro, GA	Georgia Southern	34–28
15	October 13, 2001	Boone, NC	Georgia Southern	27–18
16	December 8, 2001	Statesboro, GA	Georgia Southern	38–24
17	October 19, 2002	Statesboro, GA	Georgia Southern	36–20
18	October 18, 2003	Boone, NC	Appalachian State	28–21
19	October 16, 2004	Statesboro, GA	Georgia Southern	54–7
20	October 15, 2005	Boone, NC	Appalachian State	24–7
21	October 21, 2006	Statesboro, GA	Appalachian State	27–20^{2OT}
22	October 20, 2007	Boone, NC	Georgia Southern	38–35

No.	Date	Location	Winner	Score
23	October 18, 2008	Statesboro, GA	Appalachian State	37–36
24	October 24, 2009	Boone, NC	Appalachian State	52–16
25	November 6, 2010	Statesboro, GA	Georgia Southern	21–14^{OT}
26	October 29, 2011	Boone, NC	Appalachian State	24–17
27	November 3, 2012	Statesboro, GA	Appalachian State	31–28
28	October 26, 2013	Boone, NC	Appalachian State	38–14
29	September 25, 2014	Statesboro, GA	Georgia Southern	34–14
30	October 22, 2015	Boone, NC	Appalachian State	31–13
31	October 27, 2016	Statesboro, GA	Appalachian State	34–10
32	November 9, 2017	Boone, NC	Appalachian State	27–6
33	October 25, 2018	Statesboro, GA	Georgia Southern	34–14
34	October 31, 2019	Boone, NC	Georgia Southern	24–21
35	December 12, 2020	Statesboro, GA	Appalachian State	34–26
36	November 27, 2021	Boone, NC	Appalachian State	27–3
37	November 26, 2022	Statesboro, GA	Georgia Southern	51–48^{2OT}
38	November 25, 2023	Boone, NC	Appalachian State	55–27
39	November 30, 2024	Statesboro, GA	Georgia Southern	29–20
40	November 6, 2025	Boone, NC	Georgia Southern	25–23
41	December 29, 2025	Birmingham, AL	Georgia Southern	29–10
42	October 31, 2026	Statesboro, GA	Georgia Southern	19–3
Series: Appalachian State leads 21–20–1

== See also ==
- List of NCAA college football rivalry games
