= JLab Audio =

American audio equipment manufacturer

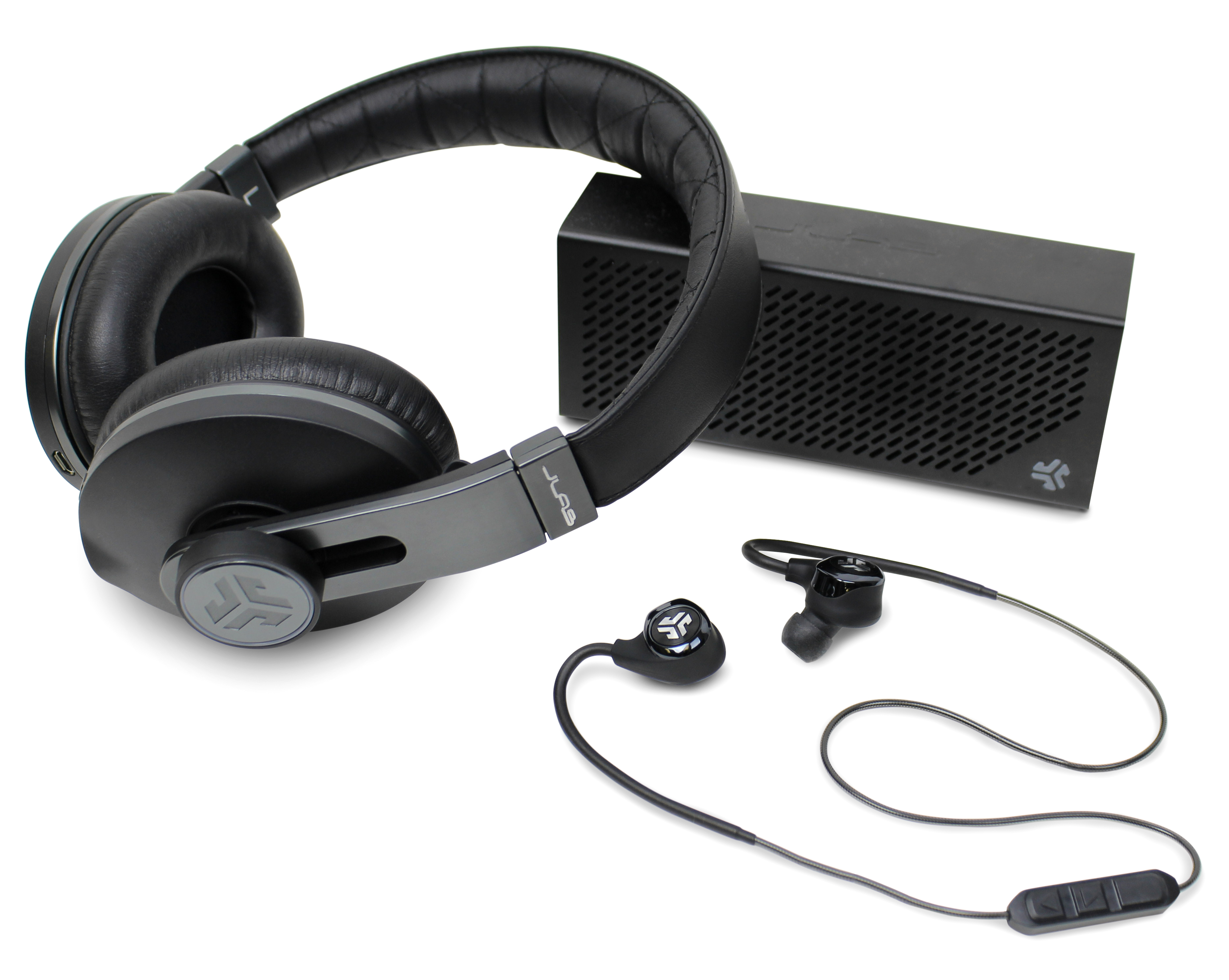
- JLab Audio Bluetooth Wireless Products
- Industry: Consumer electronics
- Founded: 2005; 21 years ago
- Founder: Eros Ocean (formerly Josh Rosenfield)
- Headquarters: Carlsbad, California, U.S.
- Key people: Winthrop Cramer (CEO)
- Products: True wireless, Wireless headphones and Earbuds
- Brands: JLab, JLab Audio, JBuds, GO, Epic headphones
- Owner: Noritsu
- Website: https://www.jlab.com/

JLab Audio is a Japanese-owned, American consumer audio brand founded in 2005. The company began by making value priced in-ear headphones, but has since expanded to include premium in-ear and over-ear headphones, as well as wireless headphones and Bluetooth speakers.

== History ==
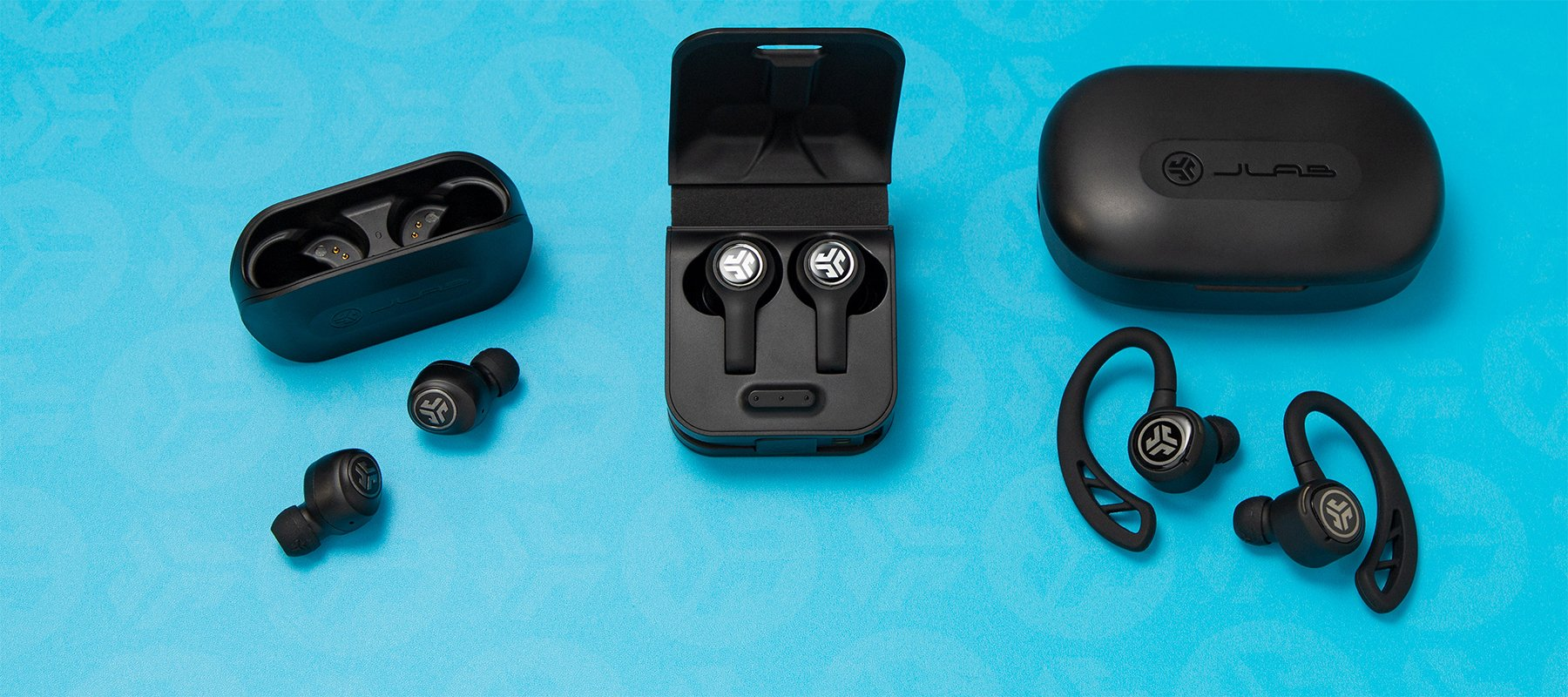
JLab earbuds

JLab was founded by Eros Ocean (then known as Josh Rosenfield) in 2005 in Tucson, Arizona, where they operated until 2012 when they relocated to Oceanside, California. This occurred after the company was purchased in January by a Dallas-based private equity group and leadership transitioned to current CEO, Winthrop Cramer. Winthrop lead the company to a top-five headphone brand in the US market and initiated a global sales plan to further accelerate growth. Winthrop was named EY Entrepreneur of the Year in 2019, a top 40 under 40 in CE by Dealerscope.

After growing more than 250 percent from 2015 to 2017, JLab moved into a new facility in Carlsbad, California, to support its growth. JLab became the official audio partner of Major League Soccer in 2017.

In 2021, JLab was purchased by Noritsu.

In September 2025, a four-year sponsorship agreement with college football's Birmingham Bowl was announced.
