= Pioneer DJ =

DJ product brand

Pioneer DJ Corporation
- Logo used since 2014

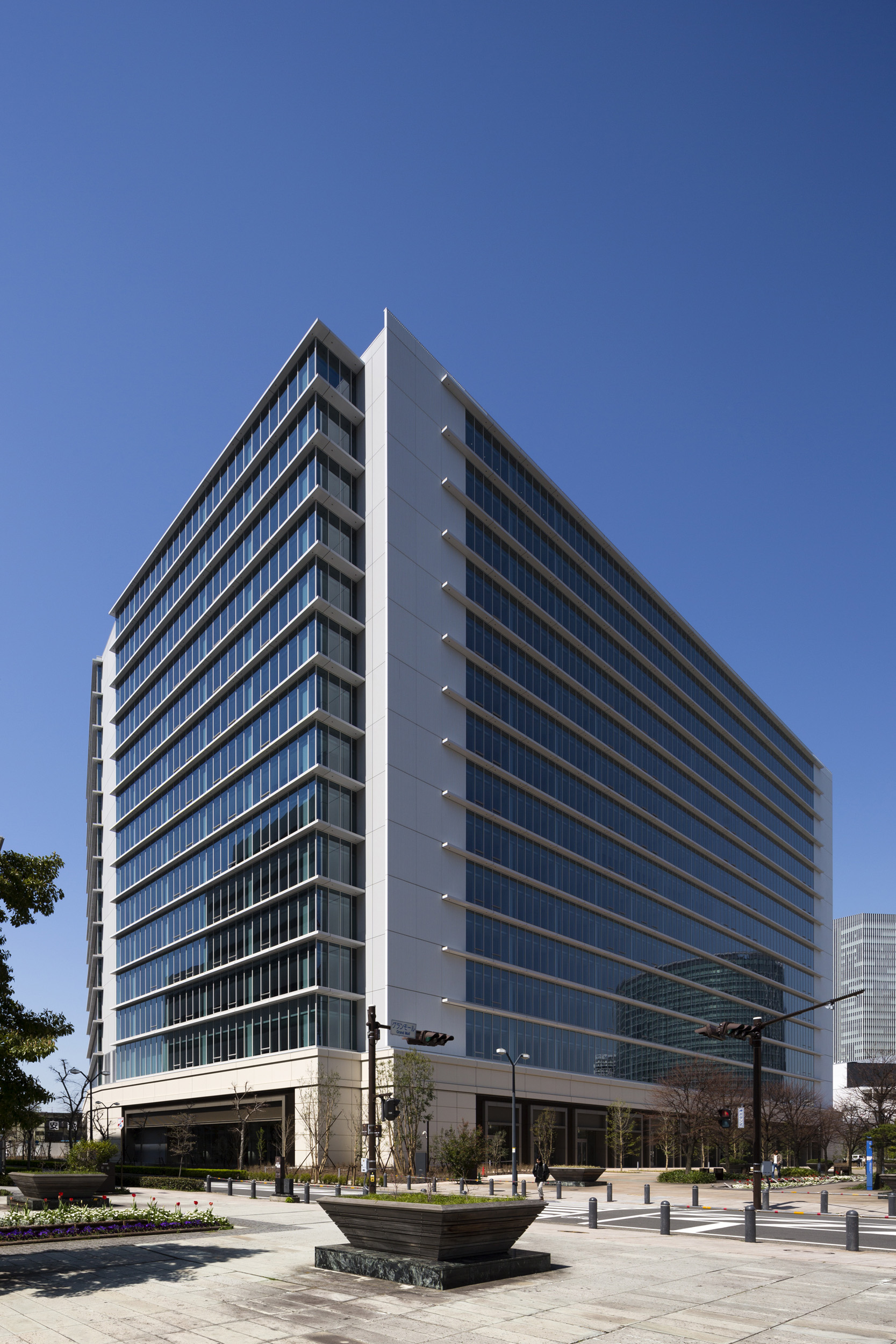
- Headquarters at Yokohama i-Mark Place
- Native name: パイオニアDJ
- Formerly: Pioneer Pro DJ
- Type: Privately Held Corporation
- Industry: Hardware and software for DJs and music production and performance
- Founded: Kawasaki (2014)
- Headquarters: Yokohama i-Mark Place, Yokohama, Kanagawa, Japan
- Area served: Worldwide
- Key people: Yoshinori Kataoka (President and CEO); Masakazu Suzuki (Executive Vice President and COO)
- Products: DJ mixers, CDJs, DJ controllers, phonographs, Rekordbox, DJM series, effects units, headphones, loudspeakers
- Number of employees: 542 (December 2024)
- Parent: Noritsu
- Website: www.pioneerdj.com

Pioneer DJ or Pioneer DJ Corporation is a brand of DJ products, including media players, DJ controllers, phonograph, DJ mixers, headphones, effects units, and loudspeakers. Originally part of Pioneer Corporation, the company became independent in 2014 as Pioneer DJ Corporation, and has produced numerous industry-standard DJ products. The company's market share of the DJ market is estimated at 60%. Pioneer DJ Corporation changed its company name to AlphaTheta Corporation from January 1, 2020. Their brands and brand names, including Pioneer DJ, were not affected by this change. In January 2024, it was announced that new products would be released under the AlphaTheta brand, alongside Pioneer DJ.

== History ==
=== Background ===
In 1937, Nozomu Matsumoto developed the Pioneer A-8, the very first dynamic speaker to be built in Japan from original components. The following year, Matsumoto founded the Fukuin Shokai Denki Seisakusho company, a radio and speaker repair shop, in Osaka Japan. In May 1947, Fukuin Denki was incorporated, and in June, 1961, the company's name was changed to Pioneer Electronic Corporation.

=== Pioneer Corporation ===
In 1994, Pioneer released the world's first CDJ, the CDJ-500, a top-loading CD deck designed for professional DJ use, with a live cue function, looping, the ability to adjust tempo without altering pitch and a rudimentary jog dial which allowed the user to nudge the track forward or backward. The company introduced a companion DJ mixer, the DJM-500 with built-in effects that could be synchronized to the BPM of the music. In 1998, Pioneer introduced the CDJ-100s, the first CDJ with built-in jog wheel-controllable effects.

In 2001, the company introduced the CDJ-1000 with "Vinyl Mode," which made it possible for a user to manipulate a touch-sensitive platter like vinyl on a turntable to slow down or speed up a track, or even scratching. The CDJ-1000 also introduced 'cue points' which allowed the user to set markers on a track and recall them. These new features, combined with the increased availability of music on CDs, as well as the comparative ease of transporting and storing CDs compared to vinyl, soon made the CDJ-1000 an industry standard in nightclubs worldwide.

In 2004, Pioneer introduced the DVJ-x1, the first video DJ deck (capable of reading DVDs and outputting video).

In 2009, Pioneer launched the first version of Rekordbox, a computer-based DJ software developed for Pioneer by Mixvibes and controllable by the newly released CDJ-2000, which supported DJing without physical media. It allowed DJs to create and manage playlists within the software, before exporting them to compact storage devices such as USB flash drives or SD cards. Playlists could then be instantly loaded onto CDJ players in a live setting. Rekordbox developed rapidly, and by 2015 was capable of performing entire DJ sets on a laptop controlled by the newly released XDJ-RX system.

=== Pioneer DJ ===
In September 2014, with an estimated DJ market share of 60%, Pioneer Corporation announced it would sell 86% of its DJ equipment business to private equity firm KKR for about 59 billion yen ($550 million), with the sale to be completed by March 2015, establishing Pioneer DJ Corporation.

In 2016, Pioneer DJ introduced the CDJ-2000NXS2, which established itself as the new industry standard, appearing on most riders for major events and nightclubs worldwide.

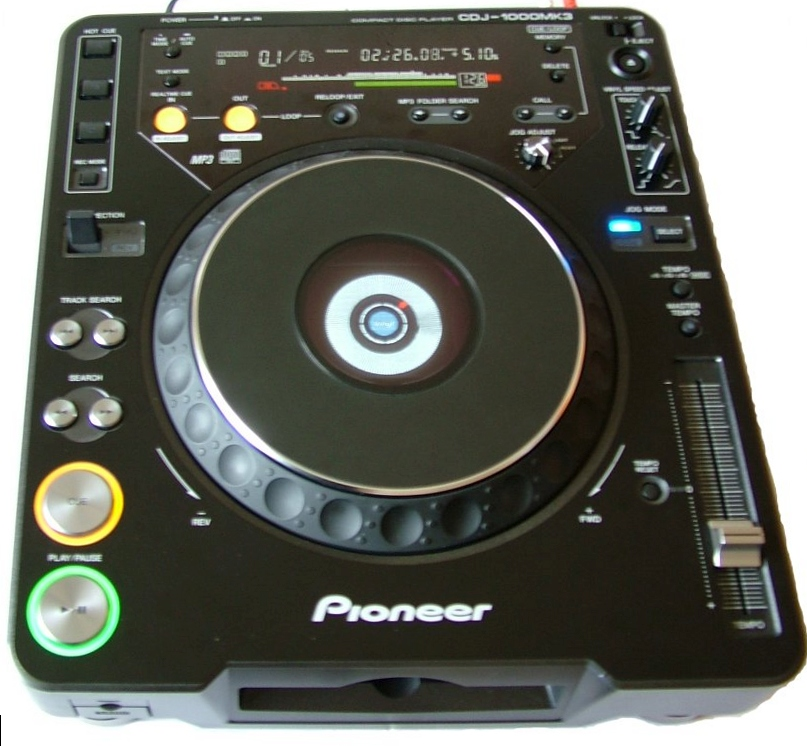
CDJ-1000MK3 (2006)

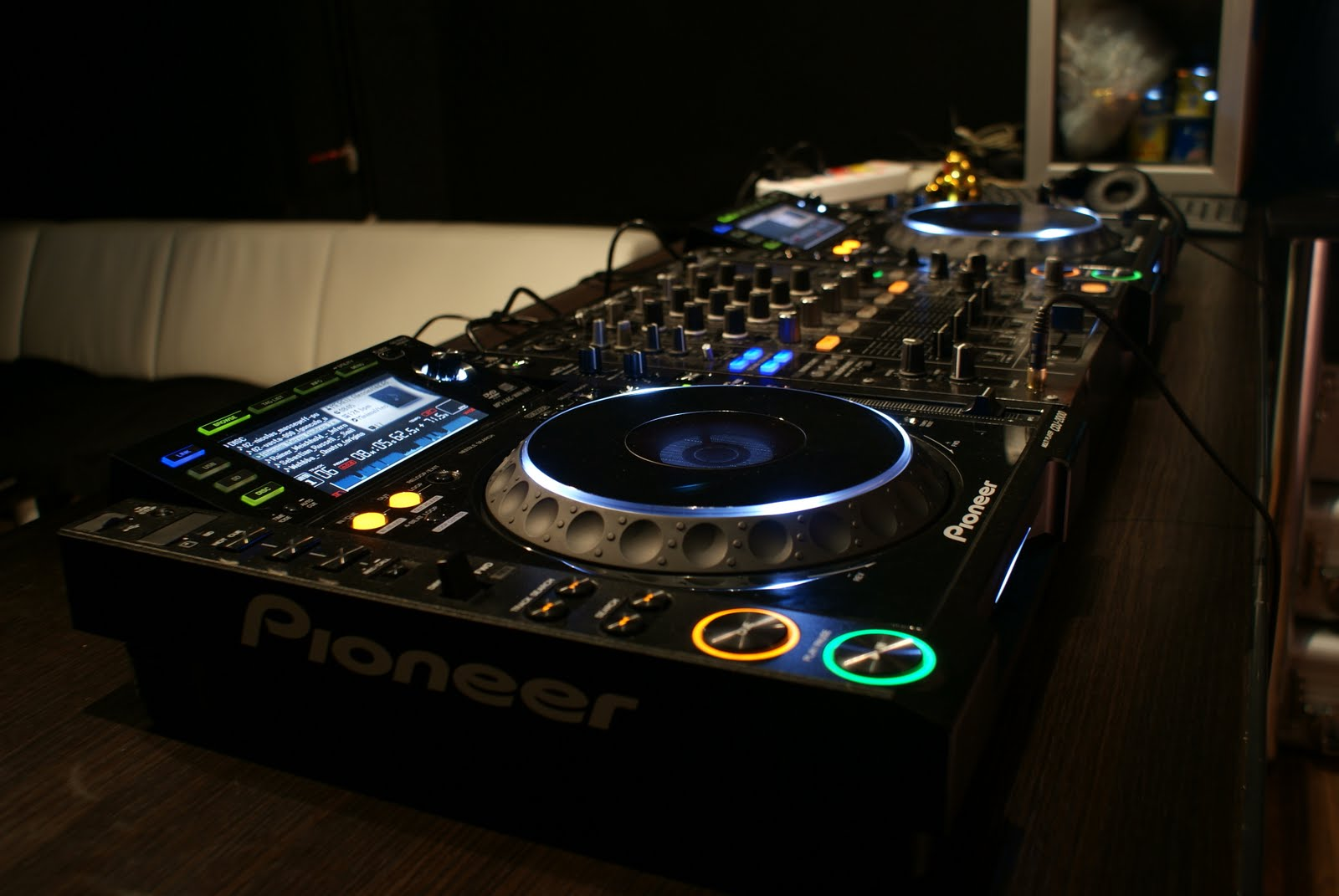
The CDJ-2000 (first item in the row of devices, with black jog dial in its center), a CD player designed by Pioneer DJ. A DJM-800 mixer is also seen directly behind it, in the middle.

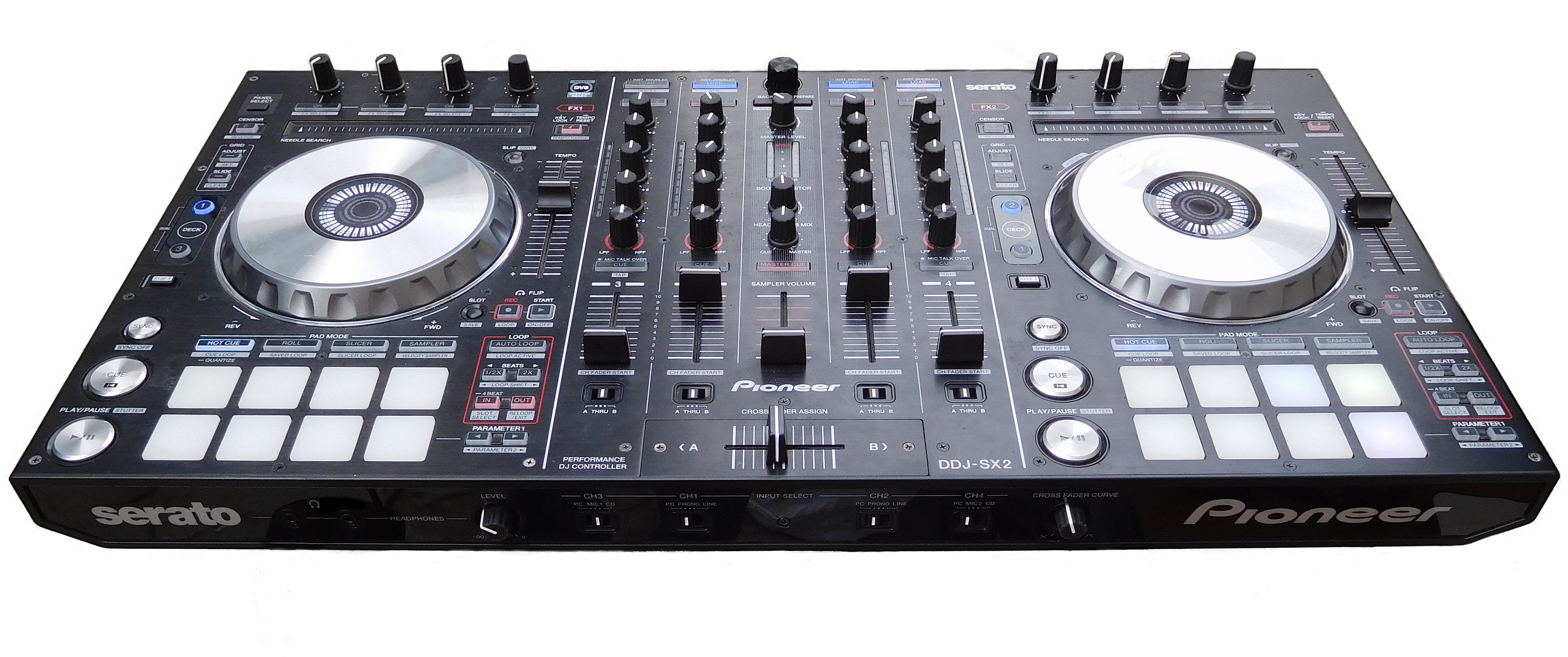
DJ-Controller DDJ-SX2, 2014

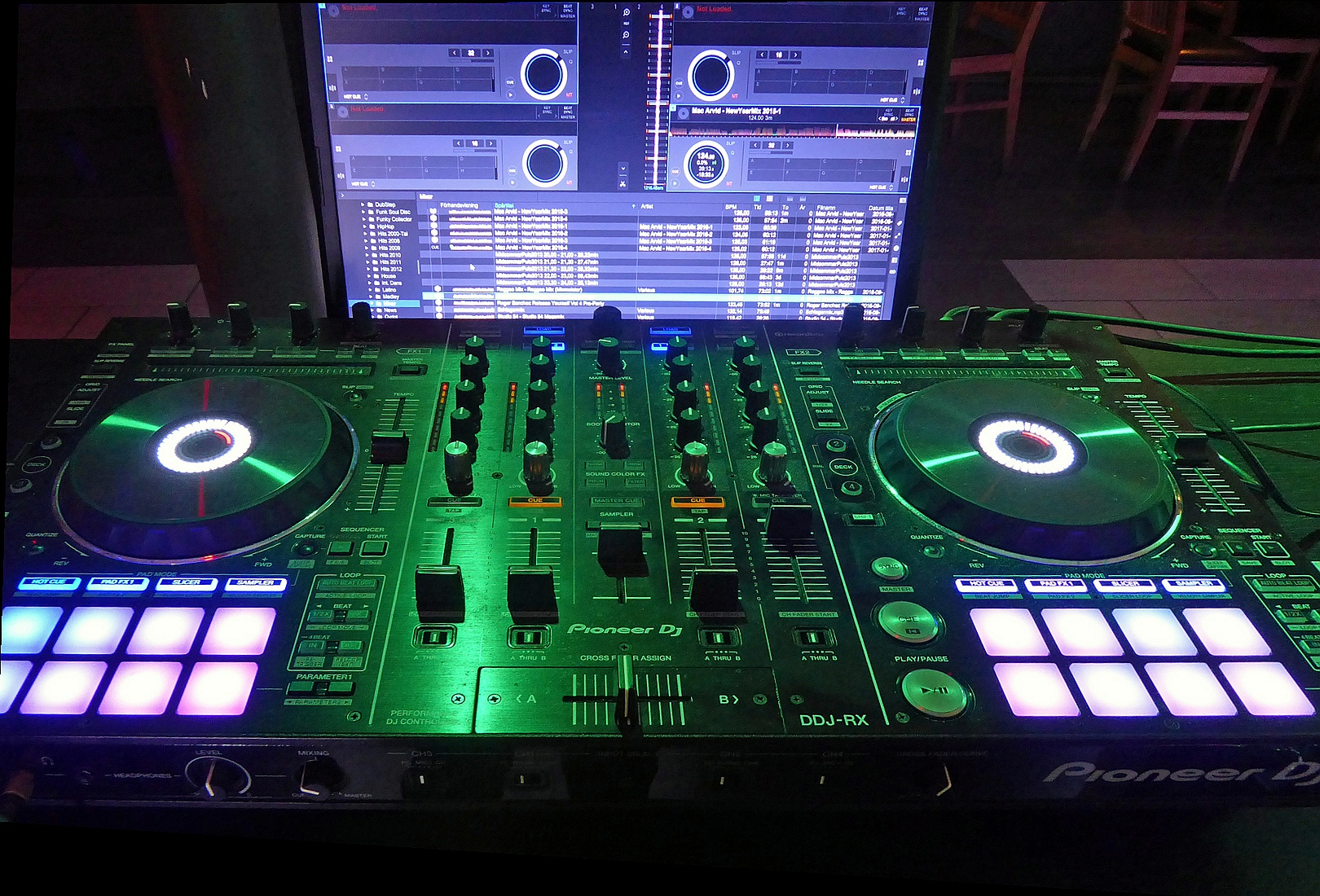
DJ Controller DDJ-RX (launched 2015) with the mixing software Rekordbox (by Mixvibes), which comes packaged with many Pioneer products, running on a computer

=== AlphaTheta ===
AlphaTheta – Logo

In 2020 Pioneer DJ's parent company's name was changed to AlphaTheta Corporation. In March of that year, KKR and Pioneer Corporation sold their respective stakes in AlphaTheta Corporation to Japanese holding company Noritsu.

On January 23, 2024, AlphaTheta Corporation confirmed that new products would be released using the AlphaTheta brand, separate from Pioneer DJ.

== See also ==
- CDJ
- DJM
