= Noritsu =

Japanese manufacturer

Noritsu Koki Co., Ltd.
- Native name: ノーリツ鋼機株式会社
- Romanized name: Nōritsu Kōki Kabushiki-gaisha
- Type: Public KK
- Traded as: TYO: 7744
- Industry: Holding company (manufacturing)
- Founded: June, 1951
- Headquarters: Azabu-juban, Minato-ku, Tokyo, Japan
- Number of locations: Joule A 5th Floor, 1-10-10
- Key people: Ryukichi Iwakiri (CEO)
- Products: Audio Equipment, Parts
- Revenue: ▲¥106,539 million yen （FY2024)
- Net income: ▲¥16,120 million yen （FY2024)
- Total assets: ▲¥299,368 million yen （FY2024
- Total equity: ▲¥222,960 million yen （FY2024)
- Website: noritsu.co.jp/en

Noritsu Koki Co., Ltd. is a Japanese holding company with subsidiaries engaged in the development and sales of audio equipment, the manufacture and sales of pen-nib components, and healthcare for medical data analysis and research.

== Overview ==
Noritsu was founded in 1951 by Nishimoto Kanichi but formally established in 1956 in Wakayama city as ""Noritsu Optical Instrument Factory" (ノーリツ光機製作所, Nōritsu-Kō-Ki Seisakusho).

Until the 2000s, the mainstay of the company's business was the QSS (Quick Service System), an automatic photo development system called a "minilab" that was installed in photo studios and DPE stores (small-scale photo development shops that existed in many cities until the 2000s), and it was the largest company with a 50% share of the global market. Since the mid-1990s, Noritsu has had a partnership with Eastman Kodak, the world's largest manufacturer of photographic film, and since Noritsu did not manufacture consumer products such as film and photographic paper, Noritsu used Kodak materials and Kodak sold Noritsu products on an OEM basis.

With the spread of digital cameras, the minilab market shrank rapidly, and the company's performance fell substantially.

Since the late 1990s, the company has also manufactured "digital minilabs," equipment that supports digital camera printing. In 2002, the company began joint development of minilabs with Kodak, and in 2006, it formed an alliance with Fujifilm, its biggest rival in the minilab industry, to jointly develop minilabs in an attempt to survive.

However, since the late 2000s, the company has been scaling back its photography-related business.

Since 2010, the company has been actively engaged in M&A activities in other industries, and has been transforming its business by entering the healthcare business. In 2016, the company sold its founding photography-related business. (Noritsu Precision, which originated from the photo processing equipment division of the former Noritsu Koki, has the largest share of the global market for film photo processing equipment, a market that will remain professional in the 2020s.)

After announcing its mid-term management plan in 2019, the company restructured its business portfolio. Currently, as a holding company, the company focuses on the "manufacturing" business through Teibow, which has a 50% share of the global market for felt-tipped pen nibs, and AlphaTheta (formerly Pioneer DJ), a manufacturer of audio equipment known for its Pioneer DJ brand, which has a 70% share of the global market for DJ equipment, as well as the "healthcare" business through JMDC (formerly Japan Medical Data Center), a medical big data company.

== History ==
Mr. Kanichi Nishimoto, the founder of Nishimoto Studio, a photo studio in Wakayama City, invented a water washing machine for photographic paper in 1951, using the principle of a water wheel. The company was established in 1956 as Noritsu Koki Seisakusho to commercialize this invention. The company's name is derived from the idea of "improving the efficiency" of the photographic development process.

Since its founding, the company has offered equipment for photo stores, and has developed and manufactured equipment for black-and-white and color photo printing one after another. In 1961, with the development of the RF-20E monochrome film processor, the company succeeded in automating the monochrome film development process for the first time in the world. In the same year, the company name was changed to Noritsu Koki.

In 1976, the company developed the QSS-1, the first model of the Quick Service System (QSS), a system that integrates the processes of developing film and making prints. In the 1970s, photo development was becoming more mechanized and faster, and the expensive and time-consuming method of having skilled operators develop each sheet of film by hand ("hand-burning") was being replaced by the more common method of sending the film to a lab to be developed in batches by a large machine ("centralized lab" method). Even so, the latter method took about a week to complete, but with the introduction of the QSS, photos could be developed in about an hour in a photo studio. The QSS was the first of a series of small-scale photo developing equipment that later became known as "minilabs," and minilabs were installed in photo studios around the world.

Later, as Fujifilm and other major Japanese photographic equipment manufacturers began to develop their minilab businesses, Noritsu established Noritsu America in 1978, making it the first company in Japan to enter the North American market. In the 1980s, Noritsu achieved great success in North America and became synonymous with minilabs in the U.S., gaining the top share of the global minilab market and the company expanded rapidly, becoming listed on the First Section of the Tokyo Stock Exchange in 1997.

Until the 2000s, there were many photo development stores called "DPE stores" in Japan. A DPE store is a small store whose main business is to develop photos and order films to the labs. They were usually attached to photo material stores, but since minilabs can develop photos without requiring skilled operators, many people from other industries entered the market. DPE stores affiliated with photographic material dealers such as Fujicolor Shop installed minilabs made by their affiliated manufacturers, while other independent DPE stores often installed minilabs made by Noritsu. In the 1980s and 1990s, a system was established where a person could hand his camera over to a DPE store set up in a corner of a supermarket, and the photos would be ready when the person has finished shopping.

However, since the 2000s, the spread of digital cameras has altered the business performance of Noritsu Koki, which is mainly in the film business. In 1996, Fujifilm released the Frontier, the world's first digital minilab, and in 1998, Konica released the QD-21, the world's first digital minilab compatible with memory cards. Noritsu was right behind to the digital market, so it partnered with Kodak and released the QSS-27 series of digital minilabs equipped with the DLS (Digital Lab System) software system developed by Kodak. In 2002, Noritsu partnered with Seiko Epson to develop the "dry minilab," which prints photos using the inkjet method without using a developing solution. Despite that, the incumbent president, Kanichi Nishimoto, died in 2005 at the age of 90. Under the leadership of the second president, Noritsu Koki sought to continue the minilab business by forming an alliance with rival Fujifilm in 2006 to jointly develop a digital minilab, but the founding family (wife and daughter of Kanichi Nishimoto), Noritsu Koki's major shareholders, dismissed all directors in 2008. Thereafter, Hirotsugu Nishimoto, former secretary and son-in-law of Kanichi Nishimoto, took over as president.

Noritsu Koki had been in the red since 2006, but as of 2008, the company had no debt, retained earnings of 70.7 billion yen, and sales of 62.6 billion yen, and was thought to be the world's largest company in the minilab business. However, in reality, the minilab industry has been in a rapid decline. In 2005, Copal, which had jointly developed minilabs with Agfa, withdrew from the minilab business following the bankruptcy of Agfa in Germany; in 2006, Konica Minolta transferred its minilab business to Noritsu (and withdrew from all camera and photo businesses at the same time); In 2010, KIS, a French company under the KIS Photo-Me group (which also had a small market share in Japan), withdrew from the minilab business, and in 2012, Kodak, which had jointly developed the minilab with Noritsu, went bankrupt. Fujifilm, Noritsu's biggest rival in the minilab business, had also scaled back its imaging business and restructured its business portfolio to focus on the healthcare business and high-functional materials. (Incidentally, Photo-Me also entered the laundromat business in 2010, and is restructuring its business portfolio while continuing its imaging business as a manufacturer of proof photos and purikura.)

Under the leadership of President Hirotsugu Nishimoto, Noritsu Koki established NK Relations in 2009 to expand into fields other than the photo processing equipment business, and developed a number of businesses unrelated to the photo processing business, including the agricultural business NK Agri. At the same time, the company downsized its photography business and separated its photography-related business from Noritsu Koki in 2011 as NK Works Co.. At the time, Noritsu had abundant funds left over from its minilab business, so Noritsu aggressively pursued M&A in different industries and acquired medical and pen-nib companies. In the fiscal year ended March 2010, Noritsu Koki posted a huge loss of 20.6 billion yen on sales of 27.9 billion yen, partly due to the impairment of the minilab business, and the company returned to profitability in the fiscal year ended March 2013.

In 2016, the company sold all of its shares in NK Works to an investment company and withdrew from the photography-related business. NK Works later changed its name to Noritsu Precision. Noritsu Precision, together with Fujifilm, was one of the last two companies to develop and sell developing machines for film photography, sharing the global market with Noritsu's QSS series and Fujifilm's Frontier series. Noritsu Precision is the last of the two companies to develop and sell film photo processing machines.

In 2015, the company relocated its headquarters from Wakayama City, the site of its factory and original business, to Minato Ward, Tokyo. There are still some former affiliates in Wakayama City, such as Noritsu Precision Headquarters, which produces photo-related equipment. The last one, the "Camera no Nishimoto Garage-mae Honten" (Nishitakamatsu, Wakayama City) and its attached "Nishimoto Studio" closed in June 2020.

In June 2018, the current CEO, Mr.Ryukichi Iwakiri, took over as CEO, and after a round of M&A strategy, began restructuring the business portfolio. In 2018, NK Relations was merged into Noritsu Koki itself. In 2019, the company announced its mid-term management plan, setting its core businesses as "manufacturing" and "healthcare". In 2019, JMDC Group, consisting of JMDC, Doctor Net, and Uniqe Software Research, which is responsible for the healthcare business, went public. In 2020, Noritsu acquired Pioneer DJ parent company AlphaTheta Corporation, and in 2021 acquired PEAG, LLC, parent company of JLab.
