= DPC =

DPC may refer to:

== Science and technology ==
- Diphenyl carbonate, an acyclic carbonate ester
- Diphenylcarbazide, a carbazide compound

=== Medicine ===
- Days post coitum, term commonly used when referring to the age of an embryo
- Direct primary care, a model of healthcare that bills patients directly rather than billing insurance companies
- Direct pulp capping, a technique used in dental restorations
- Mothers against decapentaplegic homolog 4 or Deleted in Pancreatic Cancer-4 (DPC4), a cell signaling protein

=== Computing ===
- Deferred Procedure Call, Windows mechanism to defer lower-priority tasks
- Dirty paper coding, a coding technique that can subtract a known interference

== Government and military ==
- Defence Planning Committee, a panel which oversees the Indian national security roadmap
- Defence Planning Committee (NATO)
- Department of Premier and Cabinet (disambiguation)
- Due Process Clause, of the United States Constitution
- United States Domestic Policy Council, a forum used by the President of the United States
- Displaced persons camps in post–World War II Europe
- Data Protection Commissioner, the data privacy authority in Ireland

== Organizations ==
- Digital Preservation Coalition, a non-profit company that seeks to preserve digital resources
- Doane Pet Care, US pet food manufacturer
- Duke Lemur Center, formerly Duke University Primate Center. The collection code is (DPC)

== Other uses ==
- Damp-proof course, in damp proofing
- Dominique Provost-Chalkley (born 1990), British-Canadian actress
- Dota Pro Circuit, esports tournament circuit for the video game Dota 2
- Dubai Production City, a media production zone
