= Thiosulfuric acid =

- Structural formula

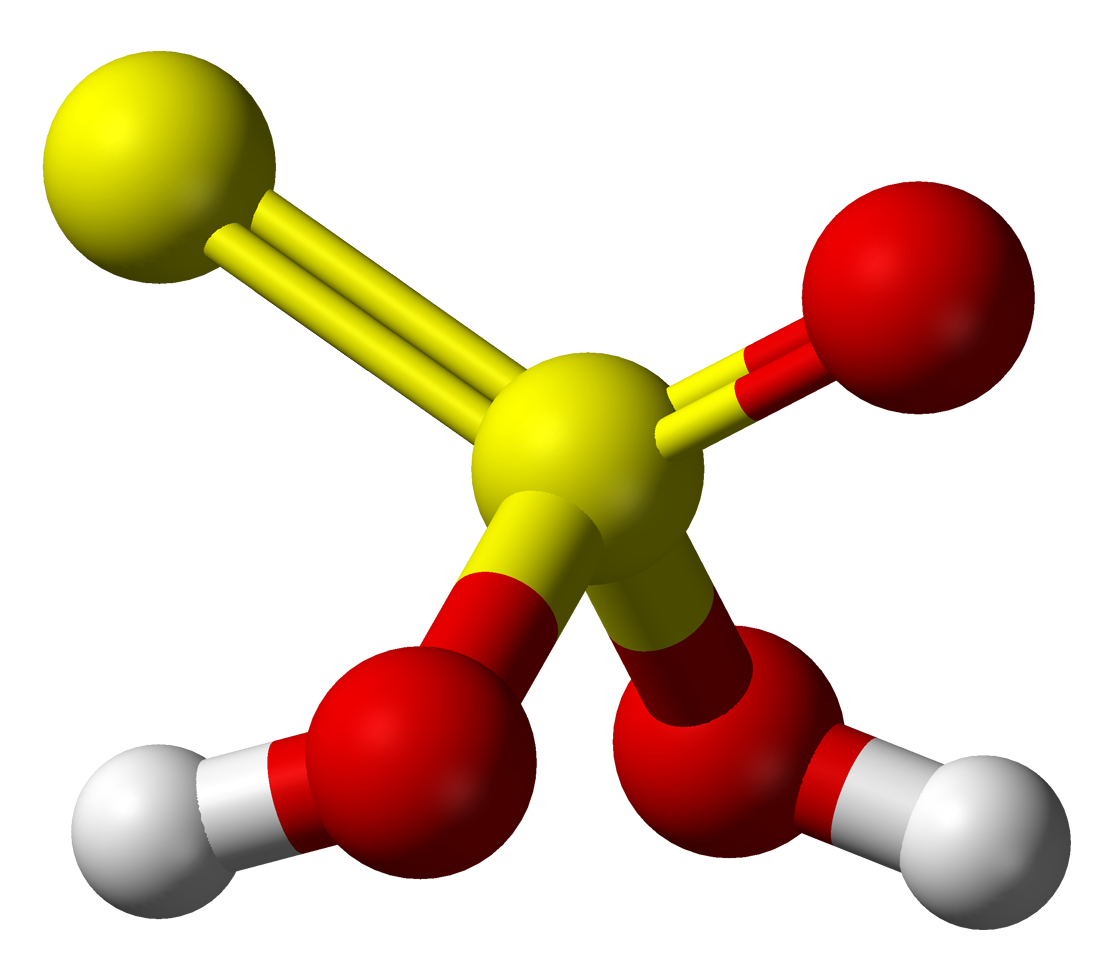
- Ball-and-stick model

Names
- IUPAC name Sulfurothioic S-acid
- Systematic IUPAC name Dihydroxidooxidosulfidosulfur
- Other names Thiosulfuric acid Sulfurothioic O,O-acid

Identifiers
| CAS Number | 13686-28-7 |
| 3D model (JSmol) | Interactive image |
| ChEBI | CHEBI:29279 |
| ChemSpider | 22886 |
| PubChem CID | 24478 |
| UNII | 7K79Y2EKKP |
| CompTox Dashboard (EPA) | DTXSID00159981 |
- InChI: InChI=1S/H2O3S2/c1-5(2,3)4/h(H2,1,2,3,4) Key: DHCDFWKWKRSZHF-UHFFFAOYSA-N; InChI=1/H2O3S2/c1-5(2,3)4/h(H2,1,2,3,4)
- SMILES: OS(=O)(=O)S

Properties
| Chemical formula | H_{2}S_{2}O_{3} |
| Molar mass | 114.13 g·mol^{−1} |
| Melting point | decomposes below 0 °C |
| Solubility in water | decomposes |
| Acidity (pK_{a}) | pK_{a1} = 0.6; pK_{a2} = 1.74 |
| Conjugate base | Thiosulfate |

Related compounds
| Other cations | Lithium thiosulfate; Sodium thiosulfate; Potassium thiosulfate; Ammonium thiosulfate |
- Except where otherwise noted, data are given for materials in their standard state (at 25 °C [77 °F], 100 kPa). verify (what is ?) Infobox references

Thiosulfuric acid is the inorganic compound with the formula H_{2}S_{2}O_{3}. It has attracted academic interest as a simple, easily accessed compound that is labile. It has few practical uses.

== Preparation and degradation ==
The acid cannot be made by acidifying aqueous thiosulfate salt solutions as the acid readily decomposes in water. The decomposition products can include sulfur, sulfur dioxide, hydrogen sulfide, polysulfanes, sulfuric acid and polythionates, depending on the reaction conditions. Anhydrous methods of producing the acid were developed by Max Schmidt:

H_{2}S + SO_{3} → H_{2}S_{2}O_{3}
Na_{2}S_{2}O_{3} + 2 HCl → 2 NaCl + H_{2}S_{2}O_{3}
HSO_{3}Cl + H_{2}S → HCl + H_{2}S_{2}O_{3}

The anhydrous acid also decomposes above −5 °C:

H_{2}S_{2}O_{3} → H_{2}S + SO_{3}

== Structure ==
The structure of the conjugate base of thiosulfuric acid.

The isomer (O=)_{2}S(−OH)(−SH) is more stable than the isomer (O=)(S=)S(−OH)_{2} as established by Hartree–Fock/ab initio calculations with a 6-311 G** basis set and MP2 to MP4 refinements. The theoretically predicted structure conforms with the double bond rule.

An isomer of thiosulfuric acid is the adduct of hydrogen sulfide and sulfur trioxide, H_{2}S·SO_{3}, which can also be prepared at low temperature. It is a white crystalline solid.
