= Ammonium bisulfate =

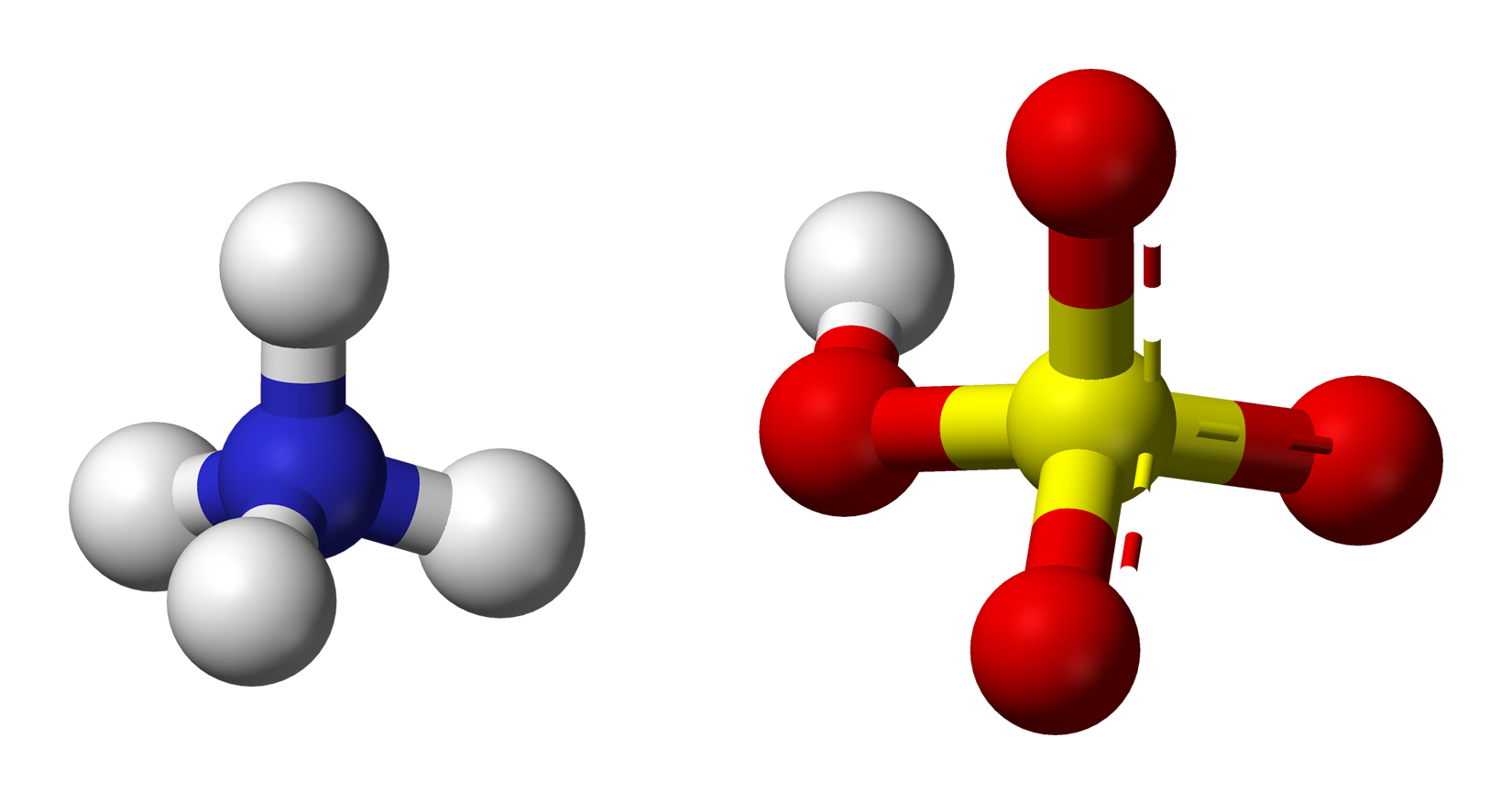
- Ball-and-stick model of an ammonium cation (left) and a bisulfite anion (right)

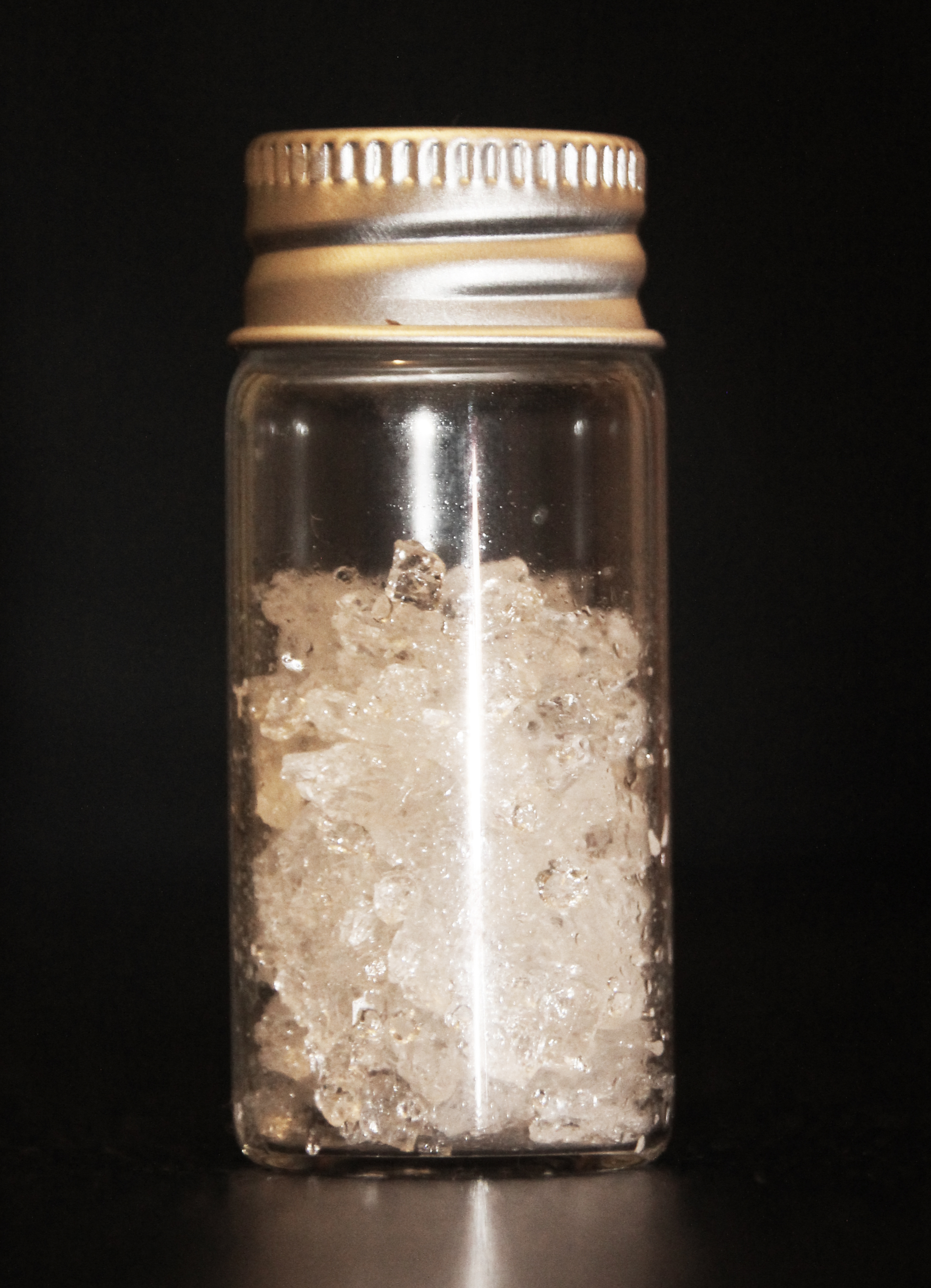

Names
- IUPAC name Ammonium hydrogen sulfate

Identifiers
CAS Number	7803-63-6
3D model (JSmol)	Interactive image
Abbreviations	ABS; AHS
ChemSpider	23057
ECHA InfoCard	100.029.332
PubChem CID	16211166
RTECS number	WS990000
UNII	6218R7MBZB
CompTox Dashboard (EPA)	DTXSID9051244
- InChI: InChI=1S/H3N.H2O4S/c;1-5(2,3)4/h1H3;(H2,1,2,3,4) Key: BIGPRXCJEDHCLP-UHFFFAOYSA-N; InChI=1/H3N.H2O4S/c;1-5(2,3)4/h1H3;(H2,1,2,3,4) Key: BIGPRXCJEDHCLP-UHFFFAOYAA
- SMILES: [O-]S(=O)(=O)O.[NH4+]

Properties
Chemical formula	NH_{4}HSO_{4}
Molar mass	115.10 g·mol^{−1}
Appearance	White solid
Density	1.78 g/cm^{3}
Melting point	147 °C (297 °F; 420 K)
Solubility in water	Very soluble
Solubility in other solvents	Soluble in methanol insoluble in acetone

Hazards
NFPA 704 (fire diamond)	3 0 0
Safety data sheet (SDS)	External MSDS

Related compounds
Other anions	Ammonium thiosulfate Ammonium sulfite Ammonium sulfate Ammonium persulfate
Other cations	Sodium bisulfate Potassium bisulfate
- Except where otherwise noted, data are given for materials in their standard state (at 25 °C [77 °F], 100 kPa). verify (what is ?) Infobox references

Ammonium bisulfate, also known as ammonium hydrogen sulfate, is a white, crystalline solid with the formula (NH_{4})HSO_{4}. This salt is the product of the half-neutralization of sulfuric acid by ammonia.

== Production ==
It is commonly collected as a byproduct of the "acetone cyanohydrin route" to the commodity chemical methyl methacrylate.

It can also be obtained by hydrolysis of sulfamic acid in aqueous solution, which produces the salt in high purity:

H_{3}NSO_{3} + H_{2}O → (NH_{4})HSO_{4}

It also arises by the thermal decomposition of ammonium sulfate:

(NH_{4})_{2}SO_{4} → (NH_{4})HSO_{4} + NH_{3}

== Applications ==
It can be further neutralized with ammonia to form ammonium sulfate, a valuable fertilizer. It can be used as a weaker alternative to sulfuric acid, although sodium bisulfate is much more common.

== Natural occurrence ==
A related compound of the (NH_{4})_{3}H(SO_{4})_{2} formula, occurs as the rare mineral letovicite, known from coal fire environments.
