= Transition metal thiosulfate complex =

Coordination complex

A transition metal thiosulfate complex is a coordination complex containing one or more thiosulfate ligands. Thiosulfate occurs in nature and is used industrially, so its interactions with metal ions are of some practical interest.

== Examples ==
Illustrative coordination complexes of thiosulfate.

Thiosulfate is a potent ligand for soft metal ions. A typical complex is [Pd(S_{2}O_{3})_{2}(ethylenediamine)]^{2−}, which features a pair of S-bonded thiosulfate ligands. Simple aquo and ammine complexes are also known. Three binding modes are common: monodentate (κ^{1}-), O,S-bidentate (κ^{2}-), and bridging (μ-).

Linkage isomerism (O vs S) has been observed in [Co(NH_{3})_{5}(S_{2}O_{3})]^{+}.

== Preparation ==
Typically, thiosulfate complexes are prepared from thiosulfate salts by displacement of aquo or chloro ligands. In some cases, they arise by oxidation of polysulfido complexes, or by binding of sulfur trioxide to sulfido ligands.

== Applications ==
=== Photography ===
Silver-thiosulfate complexes are produced by common photographic fixers. By reacting with unexposed silver halides and forming soluble silver complexes that can be washed away, fixers stabilize the image and render the film insensitive to light. Fixation involves these chemical reactions (X = halide, typically Br^{−}):

AgX + 2 S_{2}O^{2−}_{3} → [Ag(S_{2}O_{3})_{2}]^{3−} + X^{−}
AgX + 3 S_{2}O^{2−}_{3} → [Ag(S_{2}O_{3})_{3}]^{5−} + X^{−}

=== Recovery of precious metals ===
Sodium thiosulfate and ammonium thiosulfate have been proposed as alternatives to cyanide for extraction of gold from ores and printed circuit boards. The complex sodium aurothiosulfate ([Au(S_{2}O_{3})_{2}]^{3−}) is assumed to be the principal product in such extractions. Presently cyanide salts are used on a large scale for that purpose with obvious risks.

The advantages of this approach are that thiosulfate is far less toxic than cyanide and that ore types that are less usable or unusable with gold cyanidation (e.g. carbonaceous or Carlin-type ores) can be leached by thiosulfate. One problem with this alternative process is the high consumption of thiosulfate, which is more expensive than cyanide. Another issue is the lack of a suitable recovery technique since activated carbon does not adsorb [Au(S_{2}O_{3})_{2}]^{3−}, which is the standard technique used in gold cyanidation to separate the gold complex from the ore slurry.

== Naming ==
In the IUPAC Red Book the following terms may be used for thiosulfate as a ligand: trioxido-1κ^{3}O-disulfato(S—S)(2−); trioxidosulfidosulfato(2−); thiosulfato; sulfurothioato. In the naming for thiosulfate salts, the final "o" is replaced by "e".
