= Ammonium sulfite =

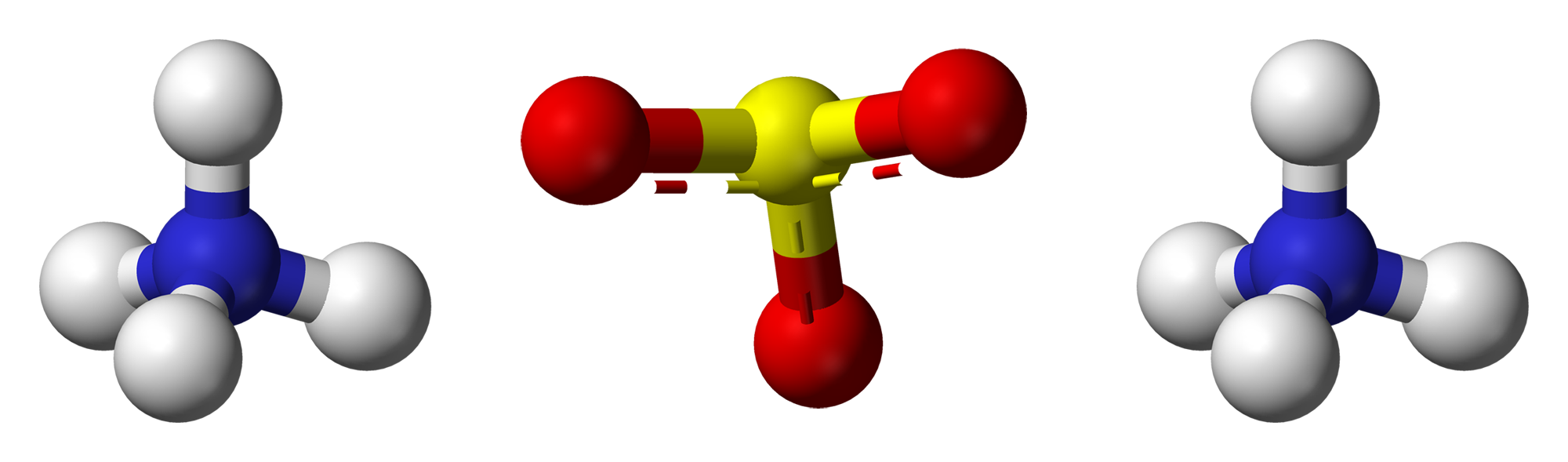
- Ball-and-stick model of two ammonium cations and one sulfite anion

Names
- IUPAC name Ammonium sulfite
- Other names Ammonium sulphite, Diammonium sulfite, Diammonium sulfonate, Sulfurous acid, Diammonium salt, Sulfurous acid, ammonium salt(1:2)

Identifiers
CAS Number	10196-04-0
3D model (JSmol)	Interactive image; Interactive image
ChemSpider	23404
ECHA InfoCard	100.030.428
EC Number	233-484-9
PubChem CID	25041
UNII	8LF589Y5GD
UN number	3077
CompTox Dashboard (EPA)	DTXSID2064991
- InChI: InChI=1S/2H3N.H2O3S/c;;1-4(2)3/h2*1H3;(H2,1,2,3) Key: PQUCIEFHOVEZAU-UHFFFAOYSA-N
- SMILES: [H][N+]([H])([H])[H].[H][N+]([H])([H])[H].O=S([O-])[O-]; [O-]S([O-])=O.[NH4+].[NH4+]

Properties
Chemical formula	(NH_{4})_{2}SO_{3}
Molar mass	116.14 g/mol
Appearance	colourless hygroscopic crystals
Melting point	65 °C (149 °F; 338 K) decomposes
Solubility in water	35 g/100 mL 32.4g/100mL at 0 degrees Celsius 60.4g/100mL at 100 degrees Celsius
Solubility	Insoluble in acetone and alcohol
Refractive index (n_{D})	1.515.

Hazards
- GHS labelling
Pictograms	(GHS05: Corrosive) (GHS07: Exclamation mark)
Signal word	Danger
Hazard statements	H314
Precautionary statements	P260, P264, P280, P301+P330+P331, P302+P352, P303+P361+P353, P304+P340, P305+P351+P338, P310, P321, P332+P313, P337+P313, P362, P363, P405, P501
NFPA 704 (fire diamond)	2 0 0
Flash point	Not Flammable

Related compounds
Other anions	Ammonium hydroxide Ammonium thiosulfate Ammonium sulfate Ammonium bisulfate Ammonium persulfate
Other cations	Sodium sulfite Potassium sulfite
- Except where otherwise noted, data are given for materials in their standard state (at 25 °C [77 °F], 100 kPa). verify (what is ?) Infobox references

Ammonium sulfite is the ammonium salt of sulfurous acid with the chemical formula (NH_{4})_{2}SO_{3}.

== Preparation ==
Ammonium sulfite can be prepared by the reaction of ammonia with sulfur dioxide in aqueous solution:

2 NH_{3} + SO_{2} + H_{2}O → (NH_{4})_{2}SO_{3}

Ammonium sulfite is produced in gas scrubbers, now obsolete, consisting of ammonium hydroxide to remove sulfur dioxide from emissions from power plants. The conversion is the basis of the Walther Process. The resulting ammonium sulfite can be air oxidized to give ammonium sulfate.

== Uses ==
Ammonium sulfite is the precursor to ammonium thiosulfate, by reaction with elemental sulfur.

=== Niche ===
For cosmetics, ammonium sulfite is used as a hair straightening agent and a hair waving agent. Ammonium based hair products have been made to replace sodium hydroxide-based products due to the destructive nature of sodium hydroxide on hair.

The most common food product with ammonium sulfite is caramel coloring E150d. According to the FDA, caramel coloring contains ammonium, potassium, or sodium sulfite.

Ammonium sulfite is used as a preservative for fixers in photography. When film photographs are being developed ammonium sulfite can be one of the reducing agents used to preserve the hypo (sodium thiosulfate or ammonium thiosulfate).

Ammonium sulfite can also be used in the making of bricks. The bricks made using ammonium sulfite are mainly used for blast furnace linings.

Ammonium sulfite can be included in lubricants for cold metal working. The lubricants are intended to reduce friction to keep heat production down and keep impurities out of the metals.

== Chemical properties ==
Ammonium sulfite is a reducing agent.

It emits sulfur dioxide and oxides of nitrogen upon heating to decomposition.

The specific gravity of ammonium sulfite is 1.41. The refractive index of ammonium sulfite is 1.515.
