= Chloride sulfite =

Class of chemical compounds

A chloride sulfite or sulfite chloride is a chemical compound that contains chloride and sulfite anions (SO_{3}^{2−} Cl^{−}). The known compounds of this type are all late [[transition metal sulfito complex]]es. Chlorine may be present as a ligand (chloro) or as an ion (chloride). The sulfito ligand can connect to the metal atom by way of an oxygen, or a sulfur atom. It can also link to the metal atom using two oxygen atoms as a bidentate ligand.

Chloride sulfites are not to be confused with the chlorosulfites, which are compounds containing the SO_{2}Cl^{−} ion or -SO_{2}Cl group in organic compounds, where it is also called chlorosulfinate. The chlorosulfates also have the formula SO_{3}Cl^{−} as a single ion, whereas chloride sulfites have three negative charges.

The mercury complex with formula ClHgSO_{3}^{−} is found in the acid gas scrubbers that purify pollution from smokestacks. However, it decomposes and does not capture mercury in this application. This complex can form an ammonium salt: ammonium chlorosulfitomercurate(II) NH_{4}[ClHgSO_{3}], which decomposes over 130 °C. The salt is formed from mercuric chloride and ammonium sulfite water solutions.

== List ==
name	formula	ratio SO_{3}:Cl	mw	system	space group	unit cell	volume	density	optical	references
chlorosulfito bis-(1,2-diaminopropane)cobalt(III) monohydrate	Co(NH_{2}CH_{2}CH_{2}CH_{2}NH_{2})_{2}(SO_{3})Cl·H_{2}O	1:1							red brown	
chlorosulfito bis-(1,2-diaminopropane)cobalt(III) tetrahydrate sodium chloride	Co(NH_{2}CH_{2}CH_{2}CH_{2}NH_{2})_{2}(SO_{3})Cl·4H_{2}O·NaCl	1:1							brown	
chlorosulfito (1,2-diaminopropane)(ethylenediamine)cobalt(III) monohydrate sodium chloride	Co(NH_{2}CH_{2}CH_{2}CH_{2}NH_{2})(NH_{2}CH_{2}CH_{2}NH_{2})(SO_{3})Cl·H_{2}O·NaCl	1:1							brick red	
chlorosulfito bis-(ethylenediamine)cobalt(III) monohydrate	[Co(NH_{2}CH_{2}CH_{2}NH_{2})_{2}(SO_{3})Cl]·H_{2}O	1:1							pink brown	
ammino sulfito bis-(ethylenediamine)cobalt(III) chloride	[Co(NH_{2}CH_{2}CH_{2}NH_{2})_{2}(SO_{3})NH_{3}]Cl								yellow brown	
sulfito bis-(ethylenediamine)cobalt(III) chloride	[Co(NH_{2}CH_{2}CH_{2}NH_{2})_{2}(SO_{3})]Cl								brown-red	
sulfito tetraammino chloro osmium	OsSO_{3}(NH_{3})_{4}Cl	1:1							pink brown	
	Na_{6}[Os(SO_{3})_{4}Cl_{2}]·10H_{2}O	4:2							purple	
	Na_{7}[Os(SO_{3})_{5}Cl]·6H_{2}O	5:1							pale violet	
	K_{8}[Os(SO_{3})_{4}Cl_{4}]	4:4							brown	
sulfito aquo octaammino μ-nitrido diosmium trichloride	[Os_{2}N(SO_{3})(NH_{3})_{8}H_{2}O]Cl_{3}	1:3							yellow brown	
	Na_{2}[Ir(SO_{3})_{2}(NH_{4})_{3}Cl]	2:1								
trisodium diaquadichlorodisulfitoiridate(III) heptahydrate	Na_{3}[IrCl_{2}(SO_{3})_{2}(OH_{2})_{2}]·7H_{2}O				Pnma	Z=4			yellow	
trisodium disulfito dichloro diammino iridium tetrahydrate	Na_{3}[Ir(SO_{3})_{2}(NH_{4})_{2}Cl_{2}]·4H_{2}O	2:2								
trisodium disulfito dichloro diammino iridium hexahydrate	Na_{3}[Ir(SO_{3})_{2}(NH_{4})_{2}Cl_{2}]·6H_{2}O	2:2							pale yellow	
tripotassium diaquadichlorodisulfitoiridate(III) dihydrate	K_{3}[IrCl_{2}(SO_{3})_{2}(OH_{2})_{2}]·2H_{2}O				C2	Z=2			yellow	
	Na_{5}[Ir(SO_{3})_{2}Cl_{4}]	2:4								
pentapotassium disulfito tetrachloro iridium hexahydrate	K_{5}[Ir(SO_{3})_{2}Cl_{4}]·6H_{2}O								light orange	
pentasodium dichlorobis(hydrogendisulfito)iridate(III)	trans-Na_{5}[IrCl_{2}{(SO_{3}H)(SO_{3})}_{2}]·10H_{2}O				C2/c				pale yellow	
pentapotassium dichlorobis(hydrogendisulfito)iridates(III)	trans-K_{5}[IrCl_{2}{(SO_{3}H)(SO_{3})}_{2}]·5H_{2}O								pale yellow	
	Na_{7}[Ir(SO_{3})_{4}Cl_{2}]	4:2								
hepta sodium tetrasulfito dichloro iridium heptahydrate	Na_{7}[Ir(SO_{3})_{4}Cl_{2}]·7H_{2}O								pale yellow	
	K_{7}[Ir(SO_{3})_{2}(NO_{3})_{2}Cl]	4:2								
	(NH4)_{5}lr(SO_{3})_{2}Cl_{4}	2:4		monoclinic	P2_{1}/n	a = 11.10 b = 7.25 c = 7.25 β= 96.5 Z = 2				
	(NH4)_{4}lr(SO_{3})_{2}Cl_{3}·4H_{2}O	2:3		monoclinic		a = 10.44 b = 9.46 c = 7.48 β = 90.5, Z = 2				
	NH_{4}[ClHgSO_{3}]	1:1			Pnma	a=15.430 b=5.525 c=6.679 Z=4				
	K[HgSO_{3}Cl]·KCl·H_{2}O	1:2	761.18	triclinc	P1_	a = 6.1571 b = 7.1342 c = 10.649 α = 76.889, β = 88.364, γ = 69.758° Z=4	426.8	4.358		
	K[HgSO_{3}Cl]·KCl·HgCl_{2}	1:4	701.24	monoclinic	P2_{1}/m	a=9.532 b=5.9593 c=10.176 β =110.522 Z=2	541.3	4.302		
	K[HgSO_{3}Cl]·HgCl_{2}	1:3	626.69	orthorhombic	Cmc2_{1}	a=5.9313 b=21.746 c=6.7899 Z=4	879.79	4.753		
	NH_{4}[HgSO_{3}Cl]·HgCl_{2}	1:3	605.65	orthorhombic	Cmc2_{1}	a=5.962 b=22.247 c=6.958 Z=4	923.0	4.358		
	NH_{4}[HgSO_{3}Cl]·HgCl_{2·}NH_{4}Cl	1:4	659.12	monoclinic	P2_{1}/m	a=9.712 b=6.138 c=10.401 β =110.92 Z=2	579.2	3.779		
	(K[HgSO_{3}Cl])_{2}·KCl·HgCl_{2}	2:5	1056.44	orthorhombic	Pnma	a=22.158 b=5.9736 c=12.249 Z=4	1621.2	4.328		
