= Mathurin-Joseph Fordos =

French pharmaceutical chemist

Mathurin-Joseph Fordos (3 November 1816 – 1 July 1878) was a French pharmaceutical chemist who was the first to examine what he named as pyocyanin, the blue pigment in pus produced by Pseudomonas aeruginosa. This was the first natural phenazine to be described. He also collaborated with Louis Daguerre and is thought to have been involved in producing one of the first photographs in 1837 of the Pont Neuf in Paris.

== Biography ==
Fordos was born in Serent and studied pharmacy at Paris where he worked in hospitals thereafter. He met and began to collaborate with Amédée Gélis, another pharmacy intern, and together they established a society for pharmaceutical science and began to conduct research. Their first work was on inorganic compounds. In 1843, the Fordos and Gélis synthesized sodium aurothiosuphate which had an application for fixing daguerreotypes. It was called Fordos and Gelis salt. The chemical became of interest again when it was claimed, in 1925, to show effectiveness in the treatment of tuberculosis. It then came to be called sanocrysin. They also examined sodium tetrathionate and sulfur nitride. In 1860 he examine the blue colour of pus and extracted the compound in crystalline form using chloroform and called in pyocyanine. He examined its physical properties and it was only in 1882 that it was found by Carle Gessard that it was produced by Pseudomonas aeruginosa and functioned to kill other competing micro-organisms. He also contributed to studies on lead in waterpipes and its toxicity when used for carrying drinking water.
