= Ammonium sulfate =

Chemical compound

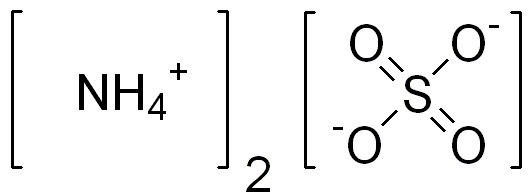
- Ammonium sulfate Lewis structure

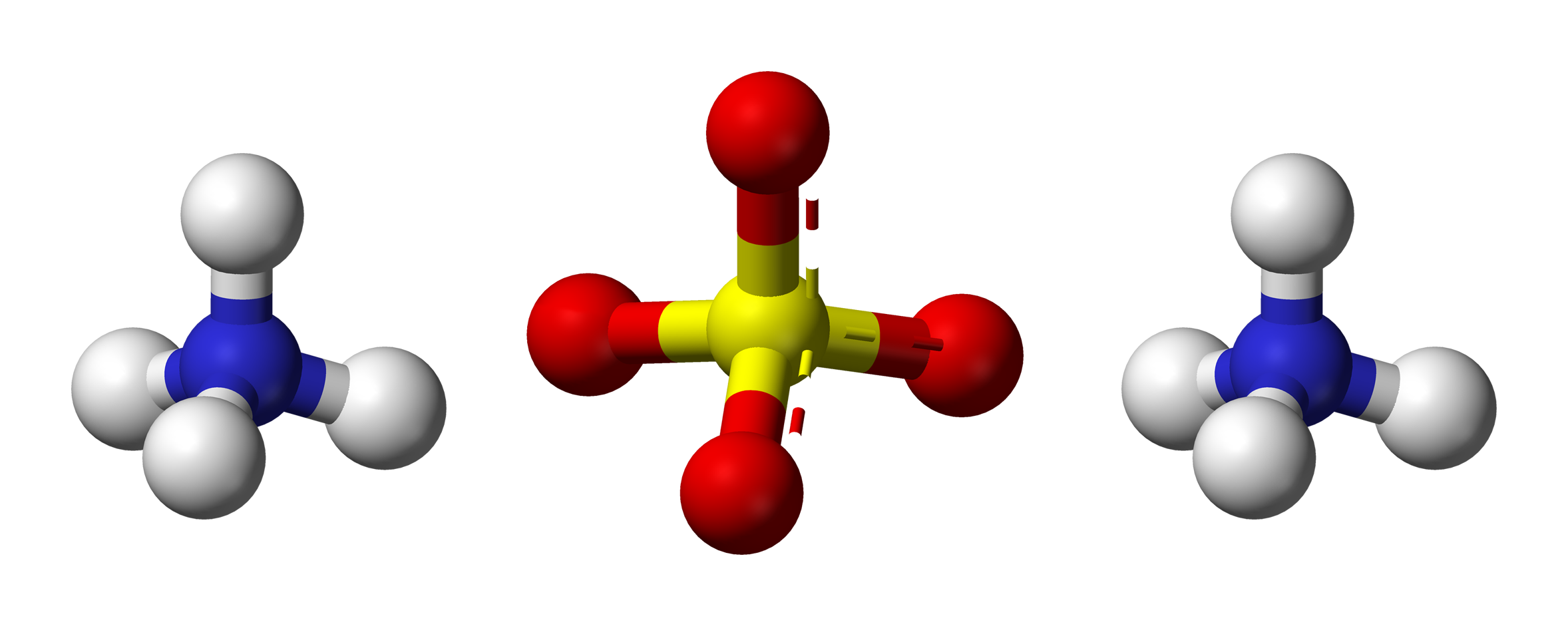
- Ball-and-stick model of two ammonium cations and one sulfate anion

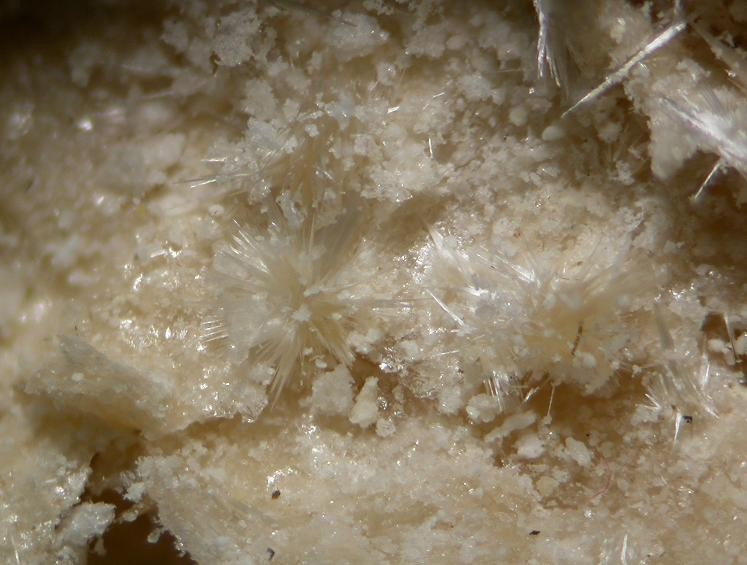
- Natural ammonium sulfate from Tajikstan

Names
- IUPAC name Ammonium sulfate
- Other names: Ammonium sulphate; Ammonium sulfate (2:1); Diammonium sulfate; Sulfuric acid diammonium salt; Mascagnite

Identifiers
CAS Number	7783-20-2
3D model (JSmol)	Interactive image
Abbreviations	AS
ChEBI	CHEBI:62946
ChemSpider	22944
ECHA InfoCard	100.029.076
EC Number	231-984-1
E number	E517 (acidity regulators, ...)
KEGG	D08853
PubChem CID	6097028
UNII	SU46BAM238
CompTox Dashboard (EPA)	DTXSID1029704
- InChI: InChI=1S/2H3N.H2O4S/c;;1-5(2,3)4/h2*1H3;(H2,1,2,3,4) Key: BFNBIHQBYMNNAN-UHFFFAOYSA-N; InChI=1/2H3N.H2O4S/c;;1-5(2,3)4/h2*1H3;(H2,1,2,3,4) Key: BFNBIHQBYMNNAN-UHFFFAOYAI
- SMILES: O=S(=O)(O)O.N.N

Properties
Chemical formula	(NH_{4})_{2}SO_{4}
Molar mass	132.13 g·mol^{−1}
Appearance	White or brown orthorhombic crystals
Density	1.77 g/cm^{3}
Melting point	280 °C (536 °F; 553 K) (decomposes)
Solubility in water	76.4 g/100g
Magnetic susceptibility (χ)	−67.0×10^{−6} cm^{3}/mol
Critical relative humidity	79.2% (30 °C (86 °F))

Structure
Crystal structure	orthorhombic

Thermochemistry
Heat capacity (C)	187.5 J⋅mol^{−1}⋅K^{−1}
Std molar entropy (S^{⦵}_{298})	220.1 J⋅mol^{−1}⋅K^{−1}
Std enthalpy of formation (Δ_{f}H^{⦵}_{298})	−1180.9 kJ⋅mol^{−1}
Gibbs free energy (Δ_{f}G^{⦵})	−901.7 kJ⋅mol^{−1}

Hazards
- GHS labelling
Hazard statements	H402
Precautionary statements	P273, P501
NFPA 704 (fire diamond)	1 0 0
- Lethal dose or concentration (LD, LC)
LD_{50} (median dose)	2840 mg/kg, rat (oral)

Related compounds
Other anions	Ammonium bisulfate; Ammonium persulfate; Ammonium sulfite; Ammonium thiosulfate
Other cations	Sodium sulfate; Potassium sulfate
Related compounds	Ammonium iron(II) sulfate
- Except where otherwise noted, data are given for materials in their standard state (at 25 °C [77 °F], 100 kPa). verify (what is ?) Infobox references

Ammonium sulfate (American English and international scientific usage; ammonium sulphate in British English); [NH_{4}]_{2}SO_{4}, is an inorganic salt with a number of commercial uses. The most common use is as a soil fertilizer. It contains 21% nitrogen and 24% sulfur.

== Uses ==
=== Agriculture ===
The primary use of ammonium sulfate is as a fertilizer for alkaline soils. In the soil, the ammonium ion is released and forms a small amount of acid, lowering the pH balance of the soil, while contributing essential nitrogen for plant growth. One disadvantage to the use of ammonium sulfate is its low nitrogen content relative to ammonium nitrate or urea, which elevates transportation costs.

It is also used as an agricultural spray adjuvant for water-soluble insecticides, herbicides, and fungicides. There, it functions to bind iron and calcium cations that are present in both well water and plant cells. It is particularly effective as an adjuvant for 2,4-D (amine), glyphosate, and glufosinate herbicides.

=== Laboratory use ===
Jar of ammonium sulfate from a collection of spare laboratory reagents

Ammonium sulfate precipitation is a common method for protein purification by precipitation. As the ionic strength of a solution increases, the solubility of proteins in that solution decreases. Being extremely soluble in water, ammonium sulfate can "salt out" (precipitate) proteins from aqueous solutions. Ammonium sulfate precipitation provides a convenient and simple means to fractionate complex protein mixtures.

In the analysis of rubber lattices, volatile fatty acids are analyzed by precipitating rubber with a 35% ammonium sulfate solution, which leaves a clear liquid from which volatile fatty acids are regenerated with sulfuric acid and then distilled with steam. Selective precipitation with ammonium sulfate, opposite to the usual precipitation technique which uses acetic acid, does not interfere with the determination of volatile fatty acids.

=== Food additive ===
As a food additive, ammonium sulfate is considered generally recognized as safe (GRAS) by the U.S. Food and Drug Administration, and in the European Union it is designated by the E number E517. It is used as an yeast nutrient in breads.

=== Other uses ===
Ammonium sulfate is a precursor to other ammonium salts, especially ammonium persulfate ((NH_{4})_{2}S_{2}O_{8}.

Ammonium sulfate is listed as an ingredient for many vaccines by the Centers for Disease Control.

Ammonium sulfate has also been used in flame retardant compositions acting much like diammonium phosphate. As a flame retardant, it increases the combustion temperature of the material, decreases maximum weight loss rates, and causes an increase in the production of residue or char.

== Preparation ==
Ammonium sulfate is made by treating ammonia with sulfuric acid:

2 NH_{3} + H_{2}SO_{4} → [NH_{4}]_{2}SO_{4}

A mixture of ammonia gas and water vapor is introduced into a reactor that contains a saturated solution of ammonium sulfate and about 2% to 4% of free sulfuric acid at 60 °C (140 °F). Concentrated sulfuric acid is added to keep the solution acidic, and to retain its level of free acid. The heat of reaction keeps reactor temperature at 60 °C (140 °F). Dry, powdered ammonium sulfate may be formed by spraying sulfuric acid into a reaction chamber filled with ammonia gas. The heat of reaction evaporates all water present in the system, forming a powdery salt. Approximately 6,000 million tons were produced in 1981.

Ammonium sulfate also is manufactured from gypsum (CaSO_{4}·2H_{2}O). Finely divided gypsum is added to an ammonium carbonate solution. Calcium carbonate precipitates as a solid, leaving ammonium sulfate in the solution.

[NH_{4}]_{2}CO_{3} + CaSO_{4} → [NH_{4}]_{2}SO_{4} + CaCO_{3}

Ammonium sulfate occurs naturally as the rare mineral mascagnite in volcanic fumaroles and due to coal fires on some dumps.

Ammonium sulfate is a byproduct in the production of methyl methacrylate (CH_{2}=C(CH_{3})COOCH_{3}).

== Properties ==
Ammonium sulfate becomes ferroelectric at temperatures below −49.5 °C (−57.1 °F). At room temperature it crystallises in the orthorhombic system, with cell sizes of a = 7.729 Å, b = 10.560 Å, c = 5.951 Å. When chilled into the ferrorelectric state, the symmetry of the crystal changes to space group Pna2_{1}.

== Reactions ==
Ammonium sulfate decomposes upon heating above 250 °C (482 °F), first forming ammonium bisulfate. Heating at higher temperatures results in decomposition into ammonia, nitrogen, sulfur dioxide, and water.

As a salt of a strong acid (H_{2}SO_{4}) and weak base (NH_{3}), its solution is acidic; the pH of 0.1 M solution is 5.5. In aqueous solution the reactions are those of [NH_{4}]^{+} and SO^{2−}_{4} ions. For example, addition of barium chloride, precipitates out barium sulfate. The filtrate on evaporation yields ammonium chloride (NH_{4}Cl).

Ammonium sulfate forms many double salts (ammonium metal sulfates) when its solution is mixed with equimolar solutions of metal sulfates and the solution is slowly evaporated. With trivalent metal ions, alums such as ferric ammonium sulfate (NH_{4}Fe(SO_{4})_{2}·12H_{2}O) are formed. Double metal sulfates include ammonium cobaltous sulfate, ferrous diammonium sulfate ((NH_{4})_{2}SO_{4}·Fe(SO_{4})·6H_{2}O), ammonium nickel sulfate which are known as Tutton's salts (M_{2}M′(SO_{4})_{2}(H_{2}O)_{6}) and ammonium ceric sulfate ((NH_{4})_{4}Ce(SO_{4})_{4}·2H_{2}O).

Anhydrous double sulfates of ammonium also occur in the Langbeinites family.

Airborne particles of evaporated ammonium sulfate comprise approximately 30% of fine particulate pollution worldwide.

It reacts with additional sulfuric acid to give triammonium hydrogen disulphate, (NH_{4})_{3}H(SO_{4})_{2}.

== See also ==
- Ammonium sulfate precipitation
