= Diphenylcarbazone =

Chemical compound

Names
- IUPAC name 1-anilino-3-phenyliminourea
- Preferred IUPAC name N',2-diphenyldiazenecarbohydrazide
- Other names: 1,5-Diphenylcarbazone; sym-Diphenylcarbazone; s-Diphenylcarbazone; Diphenylcarbazone

Identifiers
CAS Number	119295-41-9
3D model (JSmol)	Interactive image
ChemSpider	10402
ECHA InfoCard	100.007.909
EC Number	208-698-0
PubChem CID	10860
UNII	96YS88318X
CompTox Dashboard (EPA)	DTXSID5060225
- InChI: InChI=1S/C13H12N4O/c18-13(16-14-11-7-3-1-4-8-11)17-15-12-9-5-2-6-10-12/h1-10,14H,(H,16,18) Key: ZFWAHZCOKGWUIT-UHFFFAOYSA-N
- SMILES: C1=CC=C(C=C1)NNC(=O)N=NC2=CC=CC=C2

Properties
Chemical formula	C_{13}H_{12}N_{4}O
Molar mass	240.26 g·mol^{−1}
Appearance	yellow to red odorless solid
Melting point	157 °C
Solubility in water	poor

Hazards
- GHS labelling
Pictograms	(GHS07: Exclamation mark)
Signal word	Warning
Hazard statements	H302, H315, H319, H335
Precautionary statements	P261, P264, P270, P271, P280, P301+P312, P302+P352, P304+P340, P305+P351+P338, P312, P321, P330, P332+P313, P337+P313, P362, P403+P233, P405, P501
- Except where otherwise noted, data are given for materials in their standard state (at 25 °C [77 °F], 100 kPa). Infobox references

1,5-Diphenylcarbazone (or simply Diphenylcarbazone) is a chemical compound from the group of the carbazones (nitrogen compounds with the basic structure HN=N-CO-NH-NH_{2}).

== Properties ==
Diphenylcarbazone is an orange solid that dissolves well in Ethanol, Chloroform and Benzene and is almost insoluble in water. It forms a purple complex compound with Hg(II) ions. Likewise, other metal ions, such as Cr(III) ions form colored complexes with Diphenylcarbazone. Diphenylcarbazone can be produced from Diphenylcarbazide via oxidation. Certain commercial products of diphenylcarbazone are a mixture with Diphenylcarbazide, which also forms colored complex compounds with certain metal ions.

== Uses ==
Diphenylcarbazone is used as an indicator for endpoint determination in mercurimetry: If a Sodium chloride solution is titrated with Mercury(II) nitrate solution, undissociated Mercury(II) chloride is formed. If the end point is exceeded, then the color complex forms with diphenylcarbazone. This method is used in water analysis to determine chloride. If you add a certain amount of mercury(II) nitrate solution in excess to a chloride solution, you can determine the color intensity of the complex photometrically and thus deduce the chloride content.
