= Mascagnite =

Rare ammonium sulfate mineral

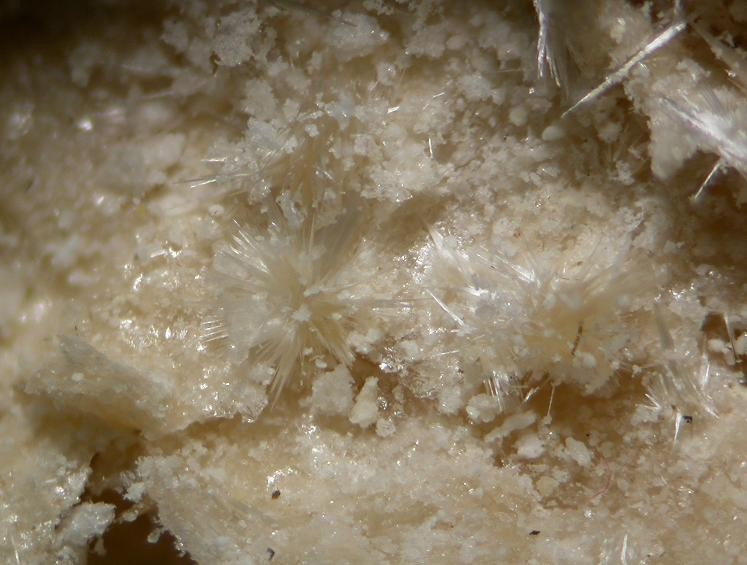
- Acicular crystals and flakes of Mascagnite

General
- Category: Sulfate mineral
- Formula: (NH_{4})_{2}SO_{4}
- IMA symbol: Msc
- Strunz classification: 7.AD.05
- Crystal system: Orthorhombic
- Crystal class: Dipyramidal (mmm); H-M symbol: (2/m 2/m 2/m)
- Space group: Pnam

Identification
- Color: Colorless, grey, yellowish-grey, yellow
- Cleavage: Distinct/ good On {001}
- Fracture: Irregular/ uneven
- Tenacity: Sectile
- Mohs scale hardness: 2 – 2 1/2
- Luster: Vitreous, dull
- Diaphaneity: Transparent, translucent, opaque
- Density: 1.768 g/cm^{3}

Mascagnite is a rare ammonium sulfate mineral (NH_{4})_{2}SO_{4}. It crystallizes in the orthorhombic system typically forming as stalactitic masses exhibiting good cleavage. It is soft (not higher than 2.5 on the Mohs scale) and water-soluble. Optical properties are variable; the purest form is transparent and colorless, but opaque gray or yellow deposits are also known.

It occurs in fumaroles, as at Mount Vesuvius and associated with coal seam fires. It was named for Italian anatomist Paolo Mascagni (1752–1815) who first described the mineral.
