= Diphenylcarbazide =

Chemical compound

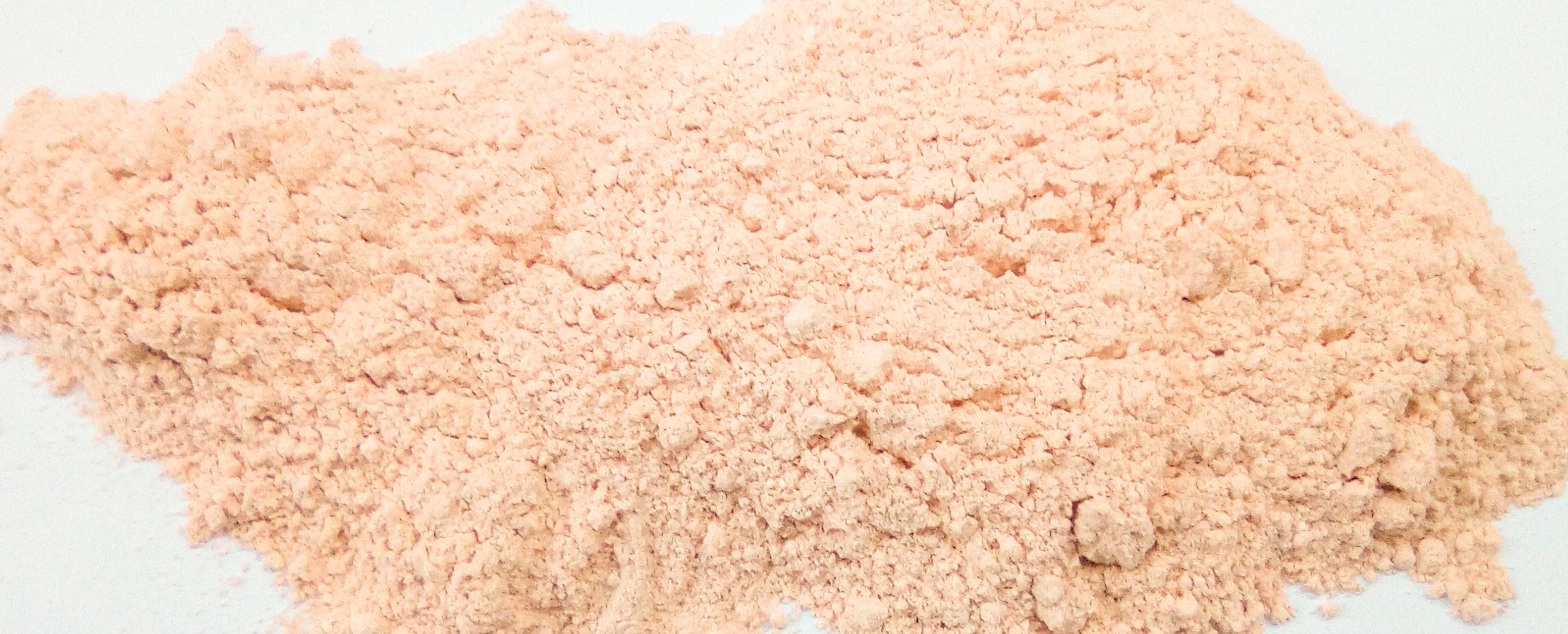

Names
- Preferred IUPAC name N′,2-Diphenylhydrazine-1-carbohydrazide
- Other names: 1,5-Diphenylcarbazide; sym-Diphenylcarbazide; s-Diphenylcarbazide; Diphenylcarbazide; DPC

Identifiers
CAS Number	140-22-7
3D model (JSmol)	Interactive image
Abbreviations	DPC
ChEBI	CHEBI:4641
ChemSpider	8459
ECHA InfoCard	100.004.913
EC Number	205-403-7
KEGG	C11232
PubChem CID	8789
UNII	1W1XPA8N0P
CompTox Dashboard (EPA)	DTXSID7059690
- InChI: InChI=1S/C13H14N4O/c18-13(16-14-11-7-3-1-4-8-11)17-15-12-9-5-2-6-10-12/h1-10,14-15H,(H2,16,17,18) Key: KSPIHGBHKVISFI-UHFFFAOYSA-N
- SMILES: C1=CC=C(C=C1)NNC(=O)NNC2=CC=CC=C2

Properties
Chemical formula	C_{13}H_{14}N_{4}O
Molar mass	242.28 g·mol^{−1}
Appearance	white odorless solid
Melting point	170–175 °C
Solubility in water	poor

Hazards
- GHS labelling
Pictograms	(GHS07: Exclamation mark)
Signal word	Warning
Hazard statements	H315, H319, H335
Precautionary statements	P261, P264, P271, P280, P302+P352, P304+P340, P305+P351+P338, P312, P321, P332+P313, P337+P313, P362, P403+P233, P405, P501
- Except where otherwise noted, data are given for materials in their standard state (at 25 °C [77 °F], 100 kPa). Infobox references

1,5-Diphenylcarbazide (or simply Diphenylcarbazide, often abbreviated DPC) is a chemical compound from the group of the carbazides. It has a structural formula similar to that of diphenylcarbazone and can be easily converted into it by oxidation.

== Properties ==
Diphenylcarbazide is a white solid that is scarcely soluble in water, but readily soluble in organic solvents like acetone, hot ethanol and acetic acid. It forms colored complex compounds with certain metal ions. Diphenylcarbazide oxidizes to Diphenylcarbazone when exposed to light and air, turning pink in the process.

== Uses ==
Diphenylcarbazide is used as a redox indicator and for the photometric determination of certain heavy metal ions, like those of Chromium, Mercury, Cadmium, Osmium, Rubidium, Technetium and more.

Reacting a Diphenylcarbazide with Chromium (VI) compounds, such as chromates or dichromates produces diphenylcarbazone, which forms a red-violet complex with the chromium compounds. Chromium (III) compounds can also be determined using this method, by first oxidizing these to Chromium (VI) using an oxidizing agent (e.g. ammonium persulfate solution). Diphenylcarbazide has also been widely used in the chemical lab to detect Mercury (II) compounds, in a similar fashion.

The reagent is typically used either as 1% to 0.25% solution in some organic solvent, or in the form of test-strip paper for detection of heavy metals in drinking water at home. The reagent is very sensitive, with a sensitivity threshold at 0.000,000,05 g/ml for Chromium (VI) ions, and 0.000,002 g/ml for Mercury (II) ions, that is 50 ppb and 2000 ppb, respectively.

In the beginning of the 20th century, the following procedure using the Diphenylcarbazide indicator was developed, to prove the presence of mercury in solution: One drop of the solution to be tested is deposited on a filter paper which had been dipped into a freshly prepared 1% alcoholic solution of Diphenylcarbazide. Mercury salts produce a purple spot, even in a very diluted solution. Chromates and molybdates produce the same reaction.

The major drawback of the test is the deterioration of stock solution of Diphenylcarbazide in different solvents. Thus, it needs to be freshly prepared. To avoid this problem, a solution has been found in the publication by Urone in 1955. Accordingly, non-aqueous Ethyl acetate and acetone were the better solvents, Diphenylcarbazide solutions of which are stable for months. Diphenylcarbazide solutions of Methyl ethyl ketone, methyl cellosolve (2-methoxyethanol), and Isopropyl alcohol are usable for 1–2 weeks. Aqueous solutions and solvents tending to be basic such as methanol and ethanol, and those containing traces of water and basic impurities, do not make good solvents for stock solutions of the colorimetric reagent

== Synthesis ==
At least 16 different routes to synthesizing the compound are known, most of which use Phenylhydrazine. An example of such a chemical reaction is the reaction between Phenylhydrazine and Urea to produce 1,5-Diphenylcarbazide in about 96% yield
