= Washing (photography) =

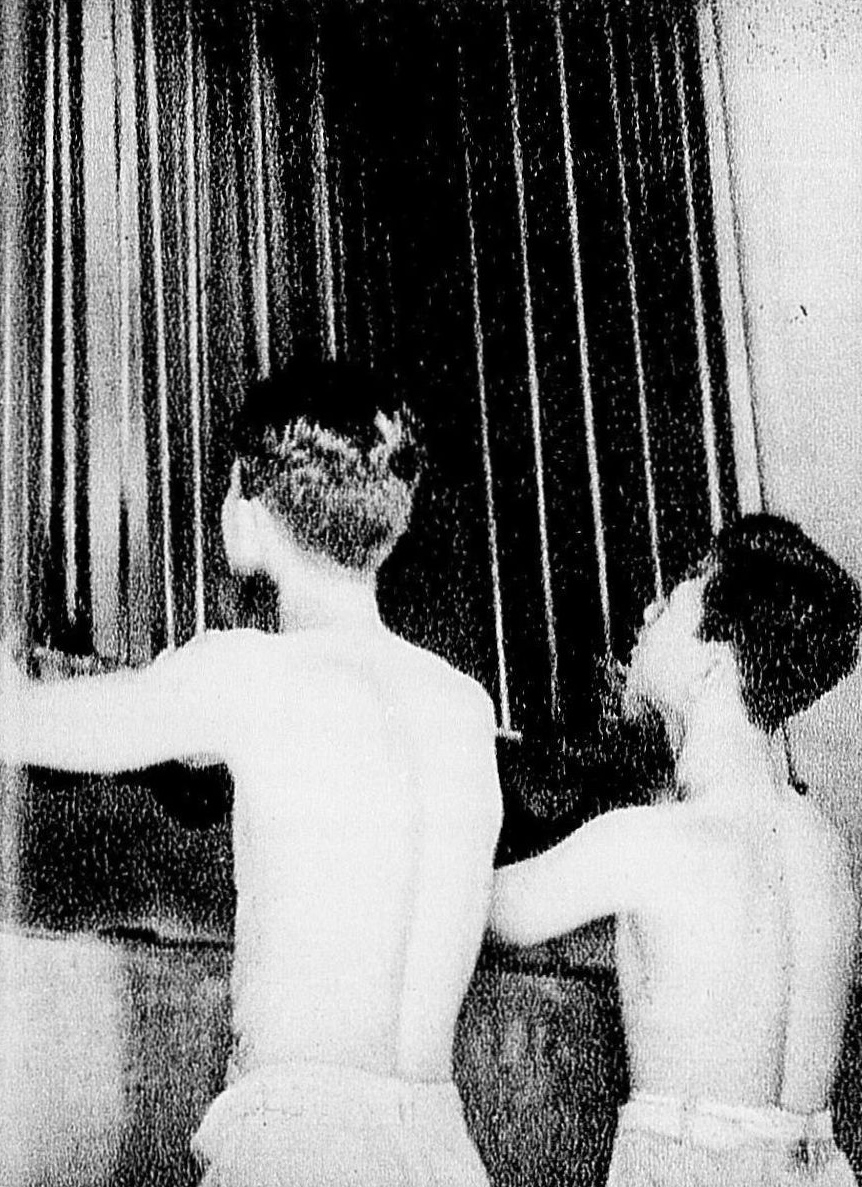
Film washing in the 1940s

In photography, washing is an important part of all film processing and printmaking processes. After materials have been fixed, washing removes unwanted and exhausted processing chemicals which, if left in situ, may cause deterioration and destruction of the image.

A disadvantage of the use of thiosulfate as a fixer is its ability to dissolve elemental silver at a very slow rate. If films or papers are inadequately washed after fixing, any residual fixer can slowly bleach or stain the photographic image. For prints on high grade fibre papers, a period of continuous washing in clean, cold water for up to 40 minutes may be required. For modern plastic (resin) coated papers, washing for as little as 2 minutes in warm water can be sufficient to eliminate residual fixer. Washing aids (also called hypo clearing agents) can be used to make the process of removing fixer faster and more thorough.

A quick, water-saving, and archival technique for washing film fixed with nonhardening fixer in a spiral tank is the popular "Ilford method":

- Fill the developing tank with tap water at the same temperature as the fixer (+/-5 °C or 9°F)—maintaining a constant bath temperature during processing is necessary to avoid reticulation of the emulsion;
- Invert the tank five times and drain it completely;
- Fill the tank again, invert it ten times, and drain it completely;
- Fill the tank again, invert it twenty times, and drain it completely.
- The film is now washed.

More conventional darkroom practice recommends washing film for 30 minutes or longer, with a flow of water sufficient to change the water in the washing container at least three times. This is not needed when non-hardening fixers are used.

Over-washing can actually reduce the archival properties of film, as thiosulfate in very small concentrations has been shown to have a beneficial effect on film image stability.
