= Sodium thiosulfate =

- Sodium thiosulfate

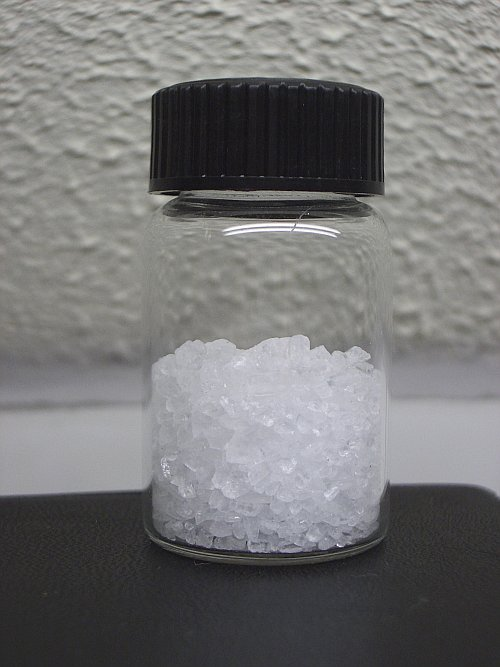

Names
- IUPAC name Sodium thiosulfate
- Other names Sodium hyposulphite Hyposulphite of soda Hypo

Identifiers
| CAS Number | anhydrous: 7772-98-7; pentahydrate: 10102-17-7 |
| 3D model (JSmol) | anhydrous: Interactive image; pentahydrate: Interactive image |
| ChEBI | anhydrous: CHEBI:132112 |
| ChEMBL | pentahydrate: ChEMBL2096650 |
| ChemSpider | anhydrous: 22885 |
| ECHA InfoCard | 100.028.970 |
| EC Number | anhydrous: 231-867-5 |
| E number | E539 (acidity regulators, ...) |
| PubChem CID | anhydrous: 24477 |
| RTECS number | anhydrous: XN6476000 |
| UNII | anhydrous: L0IYT1O31N; pentahydrate: HX1032V43M |
| CompTox Dashboard (EPA) | anhydrous: DTXSID9042417 |
- InChI: InChI=1S/2Na.H2O3S2/c;;1-5(2,3)4/h;;(H2,1,2,3,4)/q2*+1;/p-2 Key: AKHNMLFCWUSKQB-UHFFFAOYSA-L; anhydrous: InChI=1/2Na.H2O3S2/c;;1-5(2,3)4/h;;(H2,1,2,3,4)/q2*+1;/p-2 Key: AKHNMLFCWUSKQB-NUQVWONBAM; pentahydrate: InChI=1S/2Na.H2O3S2.5H2O/c;;1-5(2,3)4;;;;;/h;;(H2,1,2,3,4);5*1H2/q2*+1;;;;;;/p-2 Key: PODWXQQNRWNDGD-UHFFFAOYSA-L
- SMILES: anhydrous: [Na+].[Na+].[O-]S(=O)(=O)[S-]; pentahydrate: O.O.O.O.O.[Na+].[Na+].[O-]S(=O)(=O)[S-]

Properties
| Chemical formula | Na_{2}S_{2}O_{3} |
| Molar mass | 158.11 g/mol (anhydrous); 248.18 g/mol (pentahydrate) |
| Appearance | White crystals |
| Odor | Odorless |
| Density | 1.667 g/cm^{3} |
| Melting point | 48.3 °C (118.9 °F; 321.4 K) (pentahydrate) |
| Boiling point | 100 °C (212 °F; 373 K) (pentahydrate, - 5H_{2}O decomposition) |
| Solubility in water | 70.1 g/100 mL (20 °C); 231 g/100 mL (100 °C) |
| Solubility | negligible in alcohol |
| Refractive index (n_{D}) | 1.489 |

Structure
| Crystal structure | monoclinic |

Hazards
- GHS labelling
| Pictograms | (GHS07: Exclamation mark) |
| Signal word | Warning |
| Hazard statements | H315, H319, H335 |
| Precautionary statements | P261, P264, P271, P280, P302+P352, P304+P340, P305+P351+P338, P312, P321, P332+P313, P337+P313, P362, P403+P233, P405, P501 |
| NFPA 704 (fire diamond) | 1 0 0 |
| Flash point | Non-flammable |
| Safety data sheet (SDS) | External MSDS |

Related compounds
| Other cations | Thiosulfuric acid Lithium thiosulfate Potassium thiosulfate |
- Except where otherwise noted, data are given for materials in their standard state (at 25 °C [77 °F], 100 kPa). verify (what is ?) Infobox references

Sodium thiosulfate (sodium thiosulphate) is an inorganic compound with the formula Na_{2}S_{2}O_{3}·xH_{2}O. Typically it is available as the white or colorless pentahydrate (x = 5), which is a white solid that dissolves well in water. The compound is a reducing agent and a ligand, and these properties underpin its applications. Historically known as "hyposulphite of soda", sodium thiosulfate is used in medicine as a treatment for cyanide poisoning. It is also a reliable photographic fixer and played a key role in the development of photography in the 19th century.

== Uses ==
Sodium thiosulfate is used predominantly in dyeing. It converts some dyes to their soluble colorless "leuco" forms. It is also used to bleach "wool, cotton, silk, soaps, glues, clay, sand, bauxite, and edible oils, edible fats, and gelatin."

=== Medical uses ===
Sodium thiosulfate is used to treat cyanide poisoning. It is on the World Health Organization's List of Essential Medicines. Other uses include topical treatment of ringworm and tinea versicolor, and treating some side effects of hemodialysis and chemotherapy. In September 2022, the U.S. Food and Drug Administration (FDA) approved sodium thiosulfate under the trade name Pedmark to lessen the risk of ototoxicity and hearing loss in infant, child, and adolescent cancer patients receiving the chemotherapy medication cisplatin.

=== Photographic processing ===
In photography, sodium thiosulfate is used in both film and photographic paper processing as a photographic fixer. It is sometimes still called "hypo" from the original chemical name, hyposulphite of soda. It functions to dissolve silver halides, e.g., AgBr, components of photographic emulsions. Ammonium thiosulfate is typically preferred to sodium thiosulfate for this application.

The ability of thiosulfate to dissolve silver ions is related to its ability to dissolve gold ions.

=== Neutralizing chlorinated water ===
It is used to dechlorinate tap water including lowering chlorine levels for use in aquariums, swimming pools, and spas (e.g., following superchlorination) and within water treatment plants and within ECS BWTS to treat settled backwash water prior to release into rivers. The reduction reaction is analogous to the iodine reduction reaction.

In pH testing of bleach substances, sodium thiosulfate neutralizes the color-removing effects of bleach and allows one to test the pH of bleach solutions with liquid indicators. The relevant reaction is akin to the iodine reaction: thiosulfate reduces the hypochlorite (the active ingredient in bleach) and in so doing becomes oxidized to sulfate. The complete reaction is:

4 NaClO + Na_{2}S_{2}O_{3} + 2 NaOH → 4 NaCl + 2 Na_{2}SO_{4} + H_{2}O

Similarly, sodium thiosulfate reacts with bromine, removing the free bromine from the solution. Solutions of sodium thiosulfate are commonly used as a precaution in chemistry laboratories when working with bromine and for the safe disposal of bromine, iodine, or other strong oxidizers.

== Structure ==
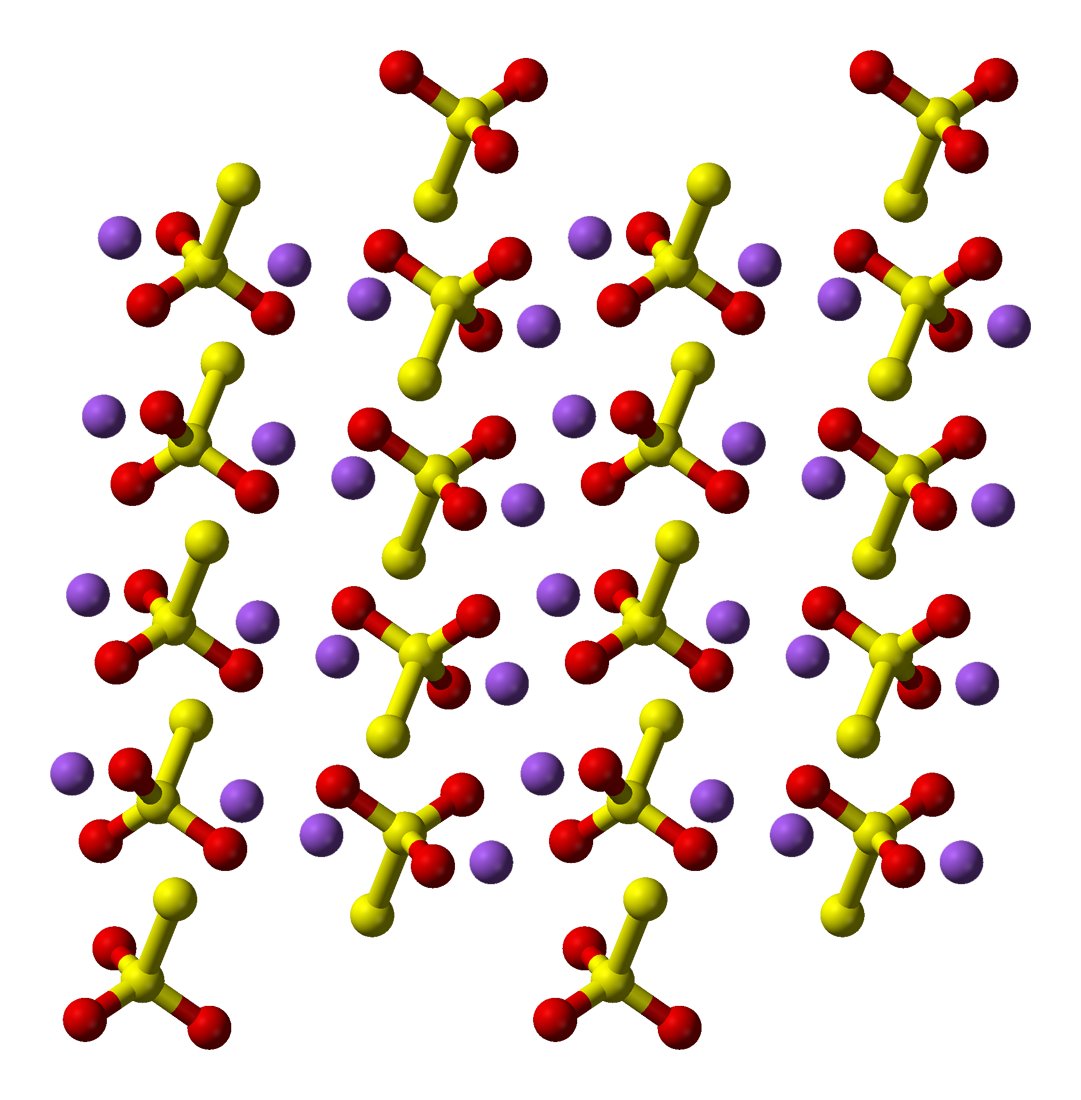
Structure of sodium thiosulfate according to X-ray crystallography, showing the tetrahedral thiosulfate anion embedded in a network of sodium ions. Color code: red = O, yellow = S

Two polymorphs are known as pentahydrate. The anhydrous salt exists in several polymorphs. In the solid state, the thiosulfate anion is tetrahedral in shape and is notionally derived by replacing one of the oxygen atoms by a sulfur atom in a sulfate anion. The S-S distance indicates a single bond, implying that the terminal sulfur holds a significant negative charge and the S-O interactions have more double-bond character.

== Production ==
Sodium thiosulfate is prepared by oxidation of sodium sulfite with sulfur. It is also produced from waste sodium sulfide from the manufacture of sulfur dyes.

This salt can also be prepared by boiling aqueous sodium hydroxide and sulfur according to the following equation. However, this is not recommended outside of a laboratory, as exposure to hydrogen sulfide can result if improperly handled.

6 NaOH + 4 S → 2 Na_{2}S + Na_{2}S_{2}O_{3} + 3 H_{2}O

== Principal reactions ==
Upon heating to 300 °C (573 K), it decomposes to sodium sulfate and sodium polysulfide:

4 Na_{2}S_{2}O_{3} → 3 Na_{2}SO_{4} + Na_{2}S_{5}

Thiosulfate salts characteristically decompose upon treatment with acids. Initial protonation occurs at sulfur. When the protonation is conducted in diethyl ether at −78 °C (195 K), H_{2}S_{2}O_{3} (thiosulfuric acid) can be obtained. It is a somewhat strong acid with pK_{a}s of 0.6 and 1.7 for the first and second dissociations, respectively. Under normal conditions, acidification of solutions of this salt excess with even dilute acids results in complete decomposition to sulfur, sulfur dioxide, and water:

8 Na_{2}S_{2}O_{3} + 16 HCl → 16 NaCl + S_{8} + 8 SO_{2} + 8 H_{2}O

=== Coordination chemistry ===
Thiosulfate forms complexes with transition metal ions. One such complex is [Au(S_{2}O_{3})_{2}]^{3−}.

=== Iodometry ===
Some analytical procedures exploit the oxidizability of thiosulfate anion by iodine. The reaction produces tetrathionate:

2 S_{2}O_{3}^{2−} + I_{2} → S_{4}O_{6}^{2−} + 2 I^{−}

Due to the quantitative nature of this reaction, as well as because Na_{2}S_{2}O_{3}·5H_{2}O has an excellent shelf-life, it is used as a titrant in iodometry. Na_{2}S_{2}O_{3}·5H_{2}O is also a component of iodine clock experiments.

This particular use can be set up to measure the oxygen content of water through a long series of reactions in the Winkler test for dissolved oxygen. It is also used in estimating volumetrically the concentrations of certain compounds in solution (hydrogen peroxide, for instance) and in estimating the chlorine content in commercial bleaching powder and water.

=== Organic chemistry ===
Alkylation of sodium thiosulfate gives S-alkylthiosulfates, which are called Bunte salts. The alkylthiosulfates are susceptible to hydrolysis, affording the thiol. This reaction is illustrated by one synthesis of thioglycolic acid:

ClCH_{2}CO_{2}H + Na_{2}S_{2}O_{3} → Na[O_{3}S_{2}CH_{2}CO_{2}H] + NaCl
Na[O_{3}S_{2}CH_{2}CO_{2}H] + H_{2}O → HSCH_{2}CO_{2}H + NaHSO_{4}

== Safety ==
Sodium thiosulfate has low toxicity. LDLo for rabbits is 4000 mg/kg.
