= Ammonium persulfate =

- Structural formulas of two ammonium cations and one peroxydisulfate anion

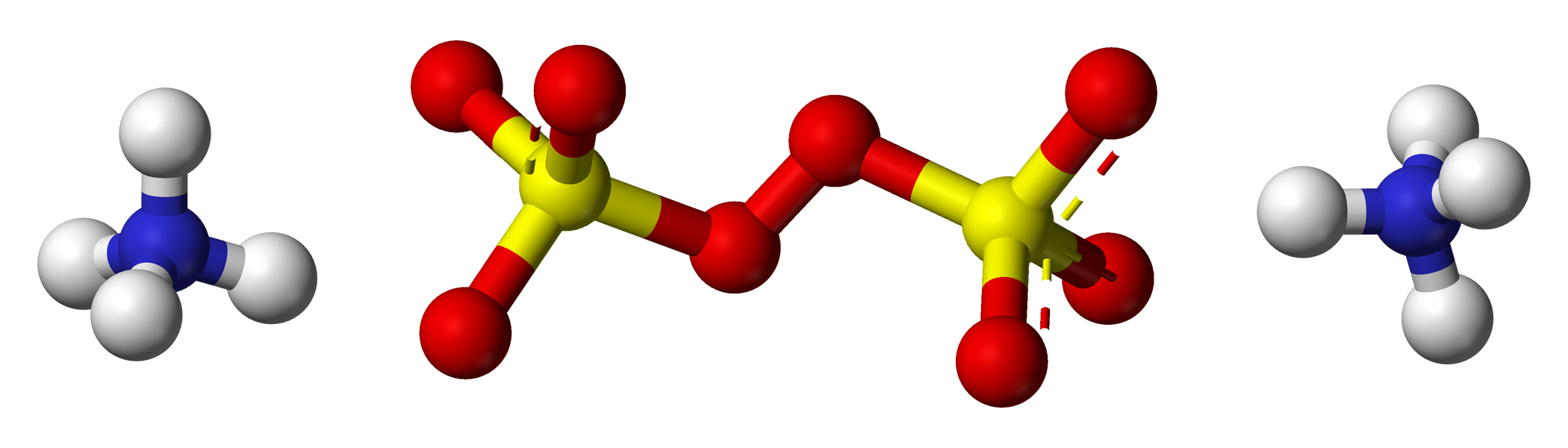
- Ball-and-stick models of two ammonium cations and one peroxydisulfate anion

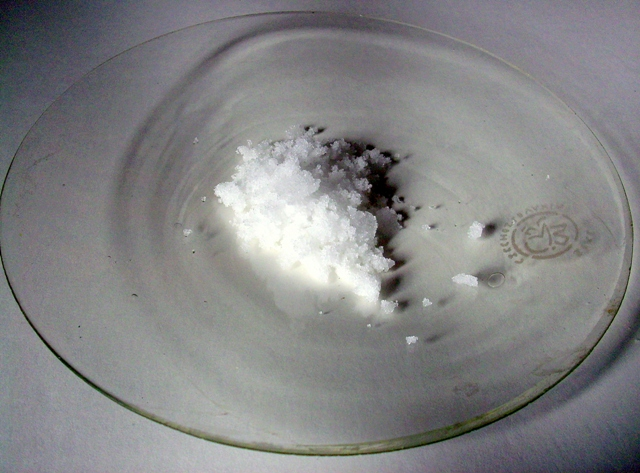
- Solid sample of ammonium persulfate, as a white powder

Names
- Other names: Ammonium peroxydisulfate

Identifiers
CAS Number	7727-54-0
3D model (JSmol)	Interactive image; Interactive image
ChemSpider	56400
ECHA InfoCard	100.028.897
EC Number	231-786-5
E number	E923 (glazing agents, ...)
PubChem CID	62648
RTECS number	SE0350000
UNII	22QF6L357F
UN number	1444
CompTox Dashboard (EPA)	DTXSID9029691
- InChI: InChI=1S/2H3N.H2O8S2/c;;1-9(2,3)7-8-10(4,5)6/h2*1H3;(H,1,2,3)(H,4,5,6) Key: ROOXNKNUYICQNP-UHFFFAOYSA-N; InChI=1/2H3N.H2O8S2/c;;1-9(2,3)7-8-10(4,5)6/h2*1H3;(H,1,2,3)(H,4,5,6) Key: ROOXNKNUYICQNP-UHFFFAOYAL
- SMILES: O=S(=O)([O-])OOS([O-])(=O)=O.[NH4+].[NH4+]; [NH4+].[NH4+].[O-]S(=O)(=O)OOS(=O)(=O)[O-]

Properties
Chemical formula	(NH_{4})_{2}S_{2}O_{8}
Molar mass	228.18 g/mol
Appearance	white to yellowish crystals
Density	1.98 g/cm^{3}
Melting point	120 °C (248 °F; 393 K) decomposes
Solubility in water	80 g/100 mL (25 °C)
Solubility	Moderately soluble in MeOH

Hazards
- GHS labelling
Pictograms	(GHS03: Oxidizing) (GHS07: Exclamation mark) (GHS08: Health hazard)
Signal word	Danger
Hazard statements	H272, H302, H315, H317, H319, H334, H335
Precautionary statements	P210, P221, P284, P305+P351+P338, P405, P501
NFPA 704 (fire diamond)	2 1 2 OX
Threshold limit value (TLV)	Airborne: 0.1 mg/m^{3} (TWA)
- Lethal dose or concentration (LD, LC)
LD_{50} (median dose)	689 mg/kg (rat, oral); 2,000 mg/kg (rat, dermal); 2.95 mg/L for 4 hours (rat, inhalation)
Safety data sheet (SDS)	7727-54-0

Related compounds
Other anions	Ammonium thiosulfate Ammonium sulfite Ammonium sulfate
Other cations	Sodium persulfate Potassium persulfate
- Except where otherwise noted, data are given for materials in their standard state (at 25 °C [77 °F], 100 kPa). verify (what is ?) Infobox references

Ammonium persulfate (APS) is the inorganic compound with the formula (NH_{4})_{2}S_{2}O_{8}. It is a colourless (white) salt that is highly soluble in water, much more so than the related potassium salt. It is a strong oxidizing agent that is used as a catalyst in polymer chemistry, as an etchant, and as a cleaning and bleaching agent.

== Preparation and structure ==
Ammonium persulfate is prepared by electrolysis of a cold concentrated solution of either ammonium sulfate or ammonium bisulfate in sulfuric acid at a high current density. The method was first described by Hugh Marshall.

The ammonium, sodium, and potassium salts adopt very similar structures in the solid state, according to X-ray crystallography. In the ammonium salt, the O-O distance is 1.497 Å. The sulfate groups are tetrahedral, with three short S-O distances near 1.44 Å and one long S-O bond at 1.64 Å.

== Uses ==
As a source of radicals, APS is mainly used as a radical initiator in the polymerization of certain alkenes. Commercially important polymers prepared using persulfates include styrene-butadiene rubber and polytetrafluoroethylene. In solution, the dianion dissociates into radicals:

[O_{3}SO–OSO_{3}]^{2−} ⇌ 2 [SO_{4}]^{•−}

Regarding its mechanism of action, the sulfate radical adds to the alkene to give a sulfate ester radical. It is also used along with tetramethylethylenediamine to catalyze the polymerization of acrylamide in making a polyacrylamide gel, hence being important for SDS-PAGE and western blot.

Because it is a powerful oxidizer, ammonium persulfate is used to etch copper on printed circuit boards as an alternative to ferric chloride solution. This property was discovered in the early 20th century. In 1908, John William Turrentine used a dilute ammonium persulfate solution to etch copper. Turrentine weighed copper spirals before placing the copper spirals into the ammonium persulfate solution for an hour. After an hour, the spirals were weighed again and the amount of copper dissolved by ammonium persulfate was recorded. This experiment was extended to other metals such as nickel, cadmium, and iron, all of which yielded similar results. The oxidation equation is thus: S_{2}O^{2−}_{8} (aq) + 2 e^{−} → 2 SO^{2−}_{4} (aq).

Ammonium persulfate is a standard ingredient in hair bleach. Persulfates are used as oxidants in organic chemistry; for example, in the Minisci reaction and Elbs persulfate oxidation.

== Safety ==
Airborne dust containing ammonium persulfate may be irritating to eye, nose, throat, lung and skin upon contact. Exposure to high levels of dust may cause difficulty in breathing.

It has been noted that persulfate salts are a major cause of asthmatic effects. Furthermore, it has been suggested that exposure to ammonium persulfate can cause asthmatic effects in hair dressers and receptionists working in the hairdressing industry. These asthmatic effects are proposed to be caused by the oxidation of cysteine residues, as well as methionine residues.
