= Thiosulfate =

Polyatomic ion (S2O3, charge –2)

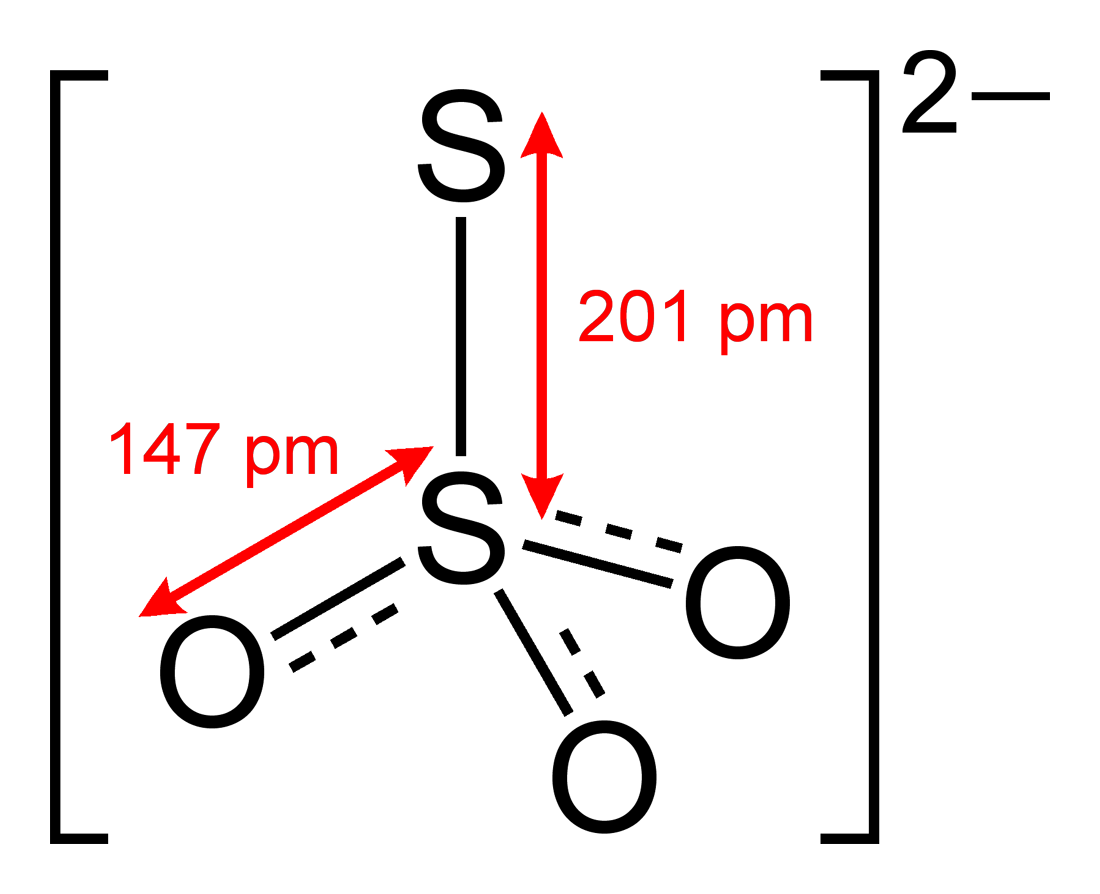

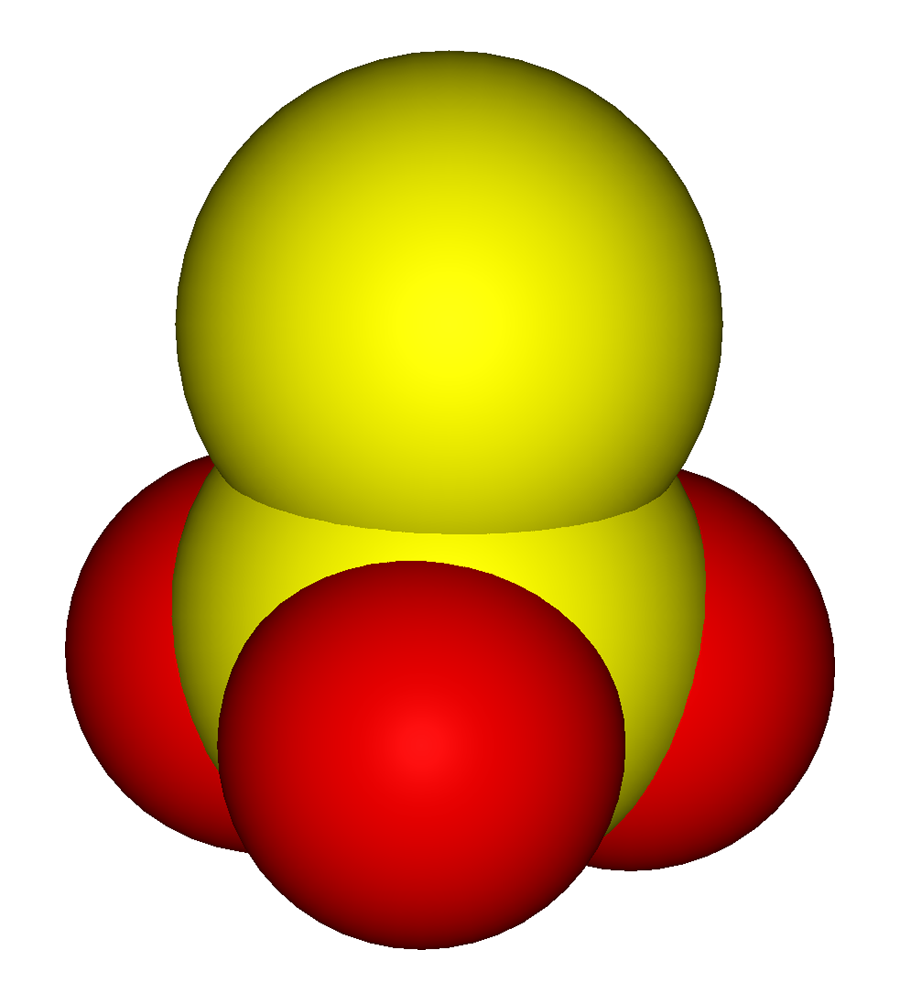

Names
- IUPAC names: Sulfurothioate; Trioxidosulfidosulfate(2−); Trioxido-1κ^{3}O-disulfate(S—S)(2−)

Identifiers
CAS Number	14383-50-7
3D model (JSmol)	Interactive image
ChEBI	CHEBI:16094
ChemSpider	1054
PubChem CID	1084
UNII	LLT6XV39PY
CompTox Dashboard (EPA)	DTXSID80932118
- InChI: InChI=1S/H2O3S2/c1-5(2,3)4/h(H2,1,2,3,4)/p-2 Key: DHCDFWKWKRSZHF-UHFFFAOYSA-L
- SMILES: [O-]S(=O)(=O)[S-]

Properties
Chemical formula	S_{2}O_{3}^{2−}
Molar mass	112.12 g·mol^{−1}
Conjugate acid	Thiosulfuric acid

Related compounds
Related compounds	Sulfates; Pyrosulfates; Dithionates; Metabisulfites; Bisulfites; Sulfites; Dithionites; Tetrathionates
- Except where otherwise noted, data are given for materials in their standard state (at 25 °C [77 °F], 100 kPa). Infobox references

Thiosulfate (IUPAC-recommended spelling; sometimes thiosulphate in British English) is an oxyanion of sulfur with the chemical formula S_{2}O_{3}^{2−}. Thiosulfate also refers to the compounds containing this anion, which are the salts of thiosulfuric acid, such as sodium thiosulfate (Na_{2}S_{2}O_{3}) and ammonium thiosulfate ((NH_{4})_{2}S_{2}O_{3}). Thiosulfate salts occur naturally. Thiosulfate rapidly dechlorinates water, and is used to halt bleaching in the paper-making industry. Thiosulfate salts are mainly used for dyeing in textiles, and bleaching of natural substances.

== Structure and bonding ==
The thiosulfate ion is tetrahedral at the central S atom. The thiosulfate ion has C_{3v} symmetry. The external sulfur atom has a valence of 2 while the central sulfur atom has a valence of 6. The oxygen atoms have a valence of 2. The S−S distance of about 201 pm in sodium thiosulfate is appropriate for a single bond. The S−O distances are slightly shorter than the S−O distances in sulfate.

For many years, the oxidation states of the sulfur atoms in the thiosulfate ion were considered to be +6 as in sulfate and −2 as in sulfide for the central and terminal atoms, respectively. This view precluded the disproportionation reaction of thiosulfate into sulfate and sulfide as a redox mechanism for providing energy to bacteria under anaerobic conditions in sediments because there is no change in oxidation state for either S atom. However, X-ray absorption near edge structure (XANES) spectroscopy measurements have revealed that the charge densities of the sulfur atoms point towards +5 and −1 oxidation states for the central and terminal S atoms, respectively. This observation is consistent with the disproportionation of thiosulfate into sulfate and sulfide as a redox mechanism freeing up energy from microbial fermentation.

== Formation ==
Thiosulfate ion is produced by the reaction of sulfite ion with elemental sulfur, and by incomplete oxidation of sulfides (e.g. pyrite oxidation). Sodium thiosulfate can be formed by disproportionation of sulfur dissolving in sodium hydroxide.

== Reactions ==
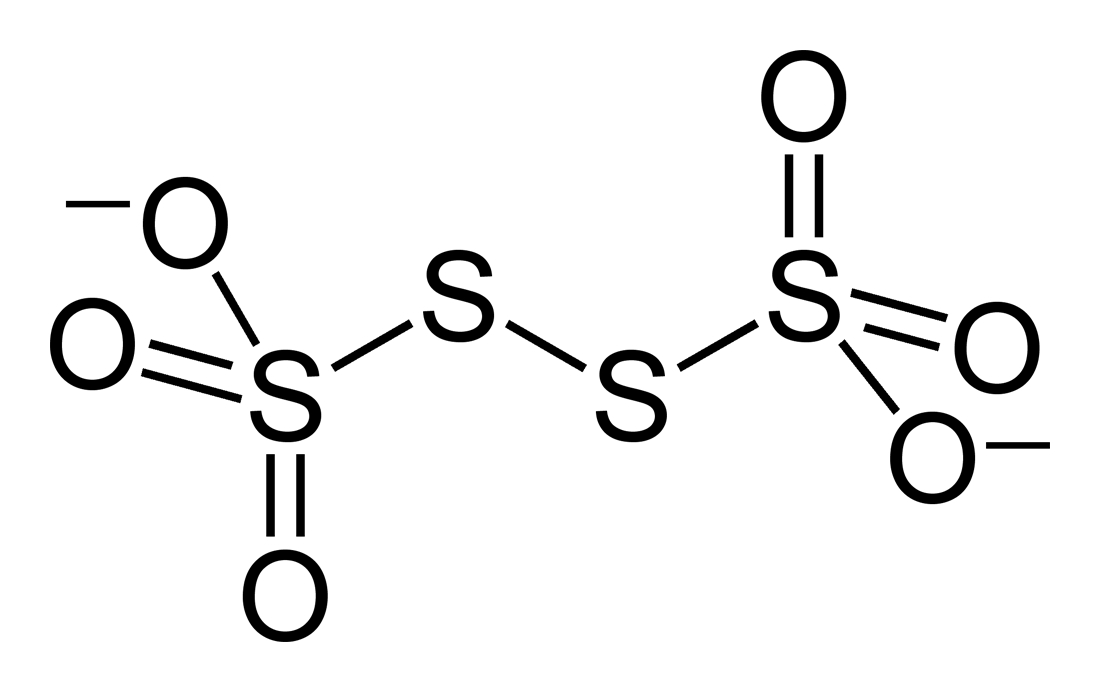
Tetrathionate anion is an oxidized derivative of thiosulfate anion.

Latimer diagram for sulfur, one of which is thiosulfate (+2)

Thiosulfate ions reacts with acids to give sulfur dioxide and various sulfur rings:

8 S_{2}O_{3}^{2−} + 16 H^{+} → → 8 SO_{2} + S_{8} + 8 H_{2}O

This reaction may be used to generate sulfur colloids and demonstrate the Rayleigh scattering of light. If white light is shone from below, blue light is seen from sideways and orange light from above, due to the same mechanisms that color the sky at midday and dusk.

Thiosulfate ions react with iodine to give tetrathionate ions:

2 S_{2}O_{3}^{2−} + I_{2} → S_{4}O_{6}^{2−} + 2 I^{−}

This reaction is key for iodometry. With bromine (X = Br) and chlorine (X = Cl), thiosulfate ions are oxidized to sulfate ions:

S_{2}O_{3}^{2−} + 4 X_{2} + 5 H_{2}O → 8 X^{−} + 10 H^{+} + 2 SO_{4}^{2−}

=== Reactions with metals and metal ions ===
Thiosulfate ion extensively forms diverse complexes with transition metals.

Also reflecting its affinity for metals, thiosulfate ion rapidly corrodes metals in acidic conditions. Steel and stainless steel are particularly sensitive to pitting corrosion induced by thiosulfate ions. Molybdenum improves the resistance of stainless steel toward pitting. In alkaline aqueous conditions and medium temperature (60 °C (140 °F)), carbon steel and stainless steel are not attacked, even at high concentration of base (30%/w potassium hydroxide), thiosulfate ion (10%/w) and in the presence of fluoride ion (5%/w potassium fluoride).

In film photography, thiosulfate salts are consumed on a large scale as a fixer reagent. This application exploits thiosulfate ion's ability to form coordination complexes with silver. Sodium thiosulfate, commonly called hypo (from "hyposulfite"), was widely used in photography to fix black and white negatives and prints after the developing stage; modern "rapid" fixers use ammonium thiosulfate as a fixing salt because it acts three to four times faster.

Thiosulfate salts have been used to extract or leach gold and silver from their ores as a less toxic alternative to cyanide ion.

=== Reactions with other salts ===
Inorganic nitrites detonate violently when heated with thiosulfates. This combination is notably used in emergency medicine in the cyanide antidote kit, though as separate medicines.

== Biochemistry ==
The enzyme rhodanase (thiosulfate sulfurtransferase) catalyzes the detoxification of cyanide ion by thiosulfate ion by transforming them into thiocyanate ion and sulfite ion:

CN^{−} + S_{2}O_{3}^{2−} → SCN^{−} + SO_{3}^{2−}

Sodium thiosulfate is used as a combination with amyl nitrite and sodium nitrite, along with hydroxocobalamin. It is most effective in a pre-hospital setting, since immediate administration by emergency personnel is necessary to reverse rapid intracellular hypoxia caused by the inhibition of cellular respiration, at complex IV.

It activates thiosulfate sulfurtransferase (TST) in mitochondria. TST is associated with protection against obesity and type II (insulin resistant) diabetes.

Thiosulfate can also work as electron donor for growth of bacteria oxidizing sulfur, such as Chlorobium limicola forma thiosulfatophilum. These bacteria use electrons from thiosulfate (and other sources) and carbon from carbon dioxide to synthesize carbon compounds through reverse Krebs cycle.

Some bacteria can metabolise thiosulfates.

== Minerals ==
Thiosulfate ion is a component of the very rare mineral sidpietersite Pb_{4}(S_{2}O_{3})O_{2}(OH)_{2}.

== Nomenclature ==
Thiosulfate is an acceptable common name and almost always used.

The functional replacement IUPAC name is sulfurothioate; the systematic additive IUPAC name is trioxidosulfidosulfate(2−) or trioxido-1κ^{3}O-disulfate(S—S)(2−).

Thiosulfate also refers to the esters of thiosulfuric acid, e.g. O,S-dimethyl thiosulfate CH_{3}−O−S(=O)_{2}−S−CH_{3}. Such species are rare.
