= Potassium thiosulfate =

Names
- Other names: Dipotassium monothiosulfate

Identifiers
CAS Number	10294-66-3
3D model (JSmol)	Interactive image
ChemSpider	55421
ECHA InfoCard	100.030.593
EC Number	233-666-8
PubChem CID	61501
UNII	UK1TD58L5O
CompTox Dashboard (EPA)	DTXSID70893108
- InChI: InChI=1S/2K.H2O3S2/c;;1-5(2,3)4/h;;(H2,1,2,3,4)/q2*+1;/p-2 Key: FGRVOLIFQGXPCT-UHFFFAOYSA-L
- SMILES: [O-]S(=O)(=S)[O-].[K+].[K+]

Properties
Chemical formula	K_{2}S_{2}O_{3}
Molar mass	190.32 g/mol
Appearance	White solid
Density	2.37 g/cm^{3}
Solubility in water	96.1 g/100 ml (0 °C); 155.4 g/100 ml (20 °C); 165 g/100 ml (25 °C); 175.7 g/100 ml (30 °C); 204.7 g/100 ml (40 °C); 215.2 g/100 ml (50 °C); 238.3 g/100 ml (60 °C); 255.2 g/100 ml (70 °C); 293.1 g/100 ml (80 °C); 312 g/100 ml (90 °C)

Hazards
- GHS labelling
Pictograms	(GHS07: Exclamation mark)
Signal word	Warning
Hazard statements	H315, H319
Precautionary statements	P264, P280, P302+P352, P305+P351+P338, P321, P332+P313, P337+P313, P362

Related compounds
Other anions	Potassium sulfite; Potassium sulfate
Other cations	Sodium thiosulfate
- Except where otherwise noted, data are given for materials in their standard state (at 25 °C [77 °F], 100 kPa). Infobox references

Potassium thiosulfate is an inorganic compound with the formula K_{2}S_{2}O_{3}. This salt can form multiple hydrates, such as the monohydrate, dihydrate, and the pentahydrate, all of which are white or colorless solids. It is used as a fertilizer.

== Formation and reactions ==
Thiosulfate salts are produced by the reaction of sulfite ion with elemental sulfur, and by incomplete oxidation of sulfides. For example, this salt is produced by reacting potassium hydroxide with ammonium hydroxide, sulfur dioxide, and elemental sulfur. Thiosulfates are stable in neutral or alkaline solutions, but not in acidic solutions, due to disproportionation to sulfur dioxide and sulfur:

S_{2}O^{2−}_{3} + 2 H^{+} → SO_{2} + "S" + H_{2}O

Due to this property, it can sequester metals, especially iron.

Thiosulfate reacts with iodine to give tetrathionate, in this case potassium thiosulfate reacts with iodine to produce potassium tetrathionate and potassium iodide:

2 K_{2}S_{2}O_{3} + I_{2} → K_{2}S_{4}O_{6} + 2 KI

Thiosulfate extensively forms diverse complexes with transition metals. In the era of silver-based photography, thiosulfate was consumed on a large scale as a "stop" reagent. This application exploits thiosulfate's ability to dissolve silver halides. Thiosulfate is also used to extract or leach gold (sodium thiosulfate) and silver from their ores as a less toxic alternative to cyanide.

== Uses ==
Potassium thiosulfate is commonly used as a fertilizer alone or with urea and/or urea ammonium nitrate due to its ability to delay nitrification. It thus has the ability to reduce the emission of nitrous oxide. It can also reduce the amount of fumigants being released from the soil. If used alone it is used in very dilute solution due to its ability to cause phytotoxicity symptoms. This is caused by the elemental sulfur being oxidized to produce sulfuric acid.

When used as a fertiliser, potassium thiosulphate can dechlorinate tap water without introducing the phytotoxic sodium ions associated with sodium thiosulphate..
