= Days post coitum =

Term commonly used when referring to the age of an embryo

dpc (Latin, short for days post coitum or dies post coitum, meaning days after sex) is a term commonly used in medicine and biology to refer to the age of an embryo.

== See also ==
- Embryology
- Developmental biology
- List of Latin phrases
