= Sodium aurothiosulfate =

Chemical compound

Clinical data
- Routes of administration: Intramuscular injection
- ATC code: M01CB02 (WHO)

Identifiers
- IUPAC name: Trisodium bis(thiosulfato)aurate(I)
- CAS Number: 33614-49-2
- PubChem CID: 161780
- DrugBank: DB13743
- ChemSpider: 142087
- UNII: CKS1YQ9W1J
- CompTox Dashboard (EPA): DTXSID90939916

Chemical and physical data
- Formula: AuNa_{3}O_{6}S_{4}
- Molar mass: 490.17 g·mol^{−1}
- 3D model (JSmol): Interactive image
- SMILES: [Na+].[Na+].[Na+].[O-]S(=O)(=O)S[Au-]SS(=O)(=O)[O-].O.O
- InChI: InChI=1S/Au.3Na.2H2O3S2.2H2O/c;;;;2*1-5(2,3)4;;/h;;;;2*(H2,1,2,3,4);2*1H2/q4*+1;;;;/p-4; Key:KZNBHWLDPGWJMM-UHFFFAOYSA-J

Sodium aurothiosulfate, or sanocrysin, is the inorganic compound with the formula Na_{3}[Au(S_{2}O_{3})_{2}]·2H_{2}O. It is the trisodium salt of the coordination complex of gold(I), [Au(S_{2}O_{3})_{2}]^{3−}. The dihydrate, which is colorless, crystallizes with two waters of crystallization. The compound has some medicinal properties as well as potential for hydrometallurgy.

== Structure ==
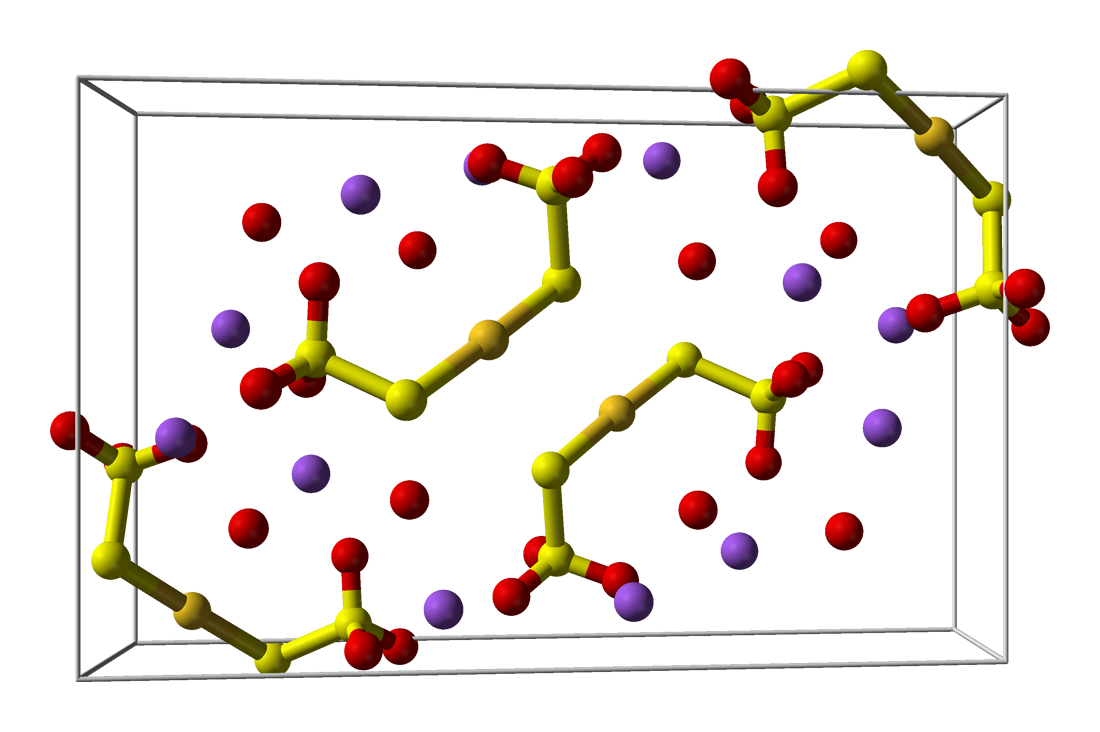
X-ray crystallographic structure of Na_{3}[Au(S_{2}O_{3})_{2}]·2H_{2}O. Color code: red = O, orange = Au, yellow = S, violet = Na. Hydrogen atoms are omitted.

The anionic complex features a linear AuS_{2} core and is overall centrosymmetric. Like most other thiosulfate complexes, only the planetary sulfur of thiosulfate is coordinated to the metal.

== History ==
The salt is typically prepared by reduction of gold(III) chloride with thiosulfate:

4 Na_{2}S_{2}O_{3} + AuCl_{3} → Na_{3}[Au(S_{2}O_{3})_{2}] + Na_{2}S_{4}O_{6} + 3 NaCl

The compound was first synthesized in 1845 by Mathurin-Joseph Fordos and A. Gélis who were researching chemicals used in the Daguerreotype photographic process. It then came to be called Fordos and Gélis salt. It went out of interest until 1924 when it was noted as a chemotherapeutic agent for tuberculosis by Holger Møllgaard in Copenhagen. Other methods of synthesis were then identified.

== Potential applications ==
Like several other gold compounds, this species is used as an antirheumatic. The first placebo-controlled trial was probably conducted in 1931, when sanocrysin was compared with distilled water for the treatment of tuberculosis.

Aurothiosulfate complexes have also been discussed in the context of the extraction of gold from its ores. The general approach would employ sodium or ammonium thiosulfate in place of cyanide salts as lixiviants.
