= Photographic fixer =

Chemicals used in photographic processing of film

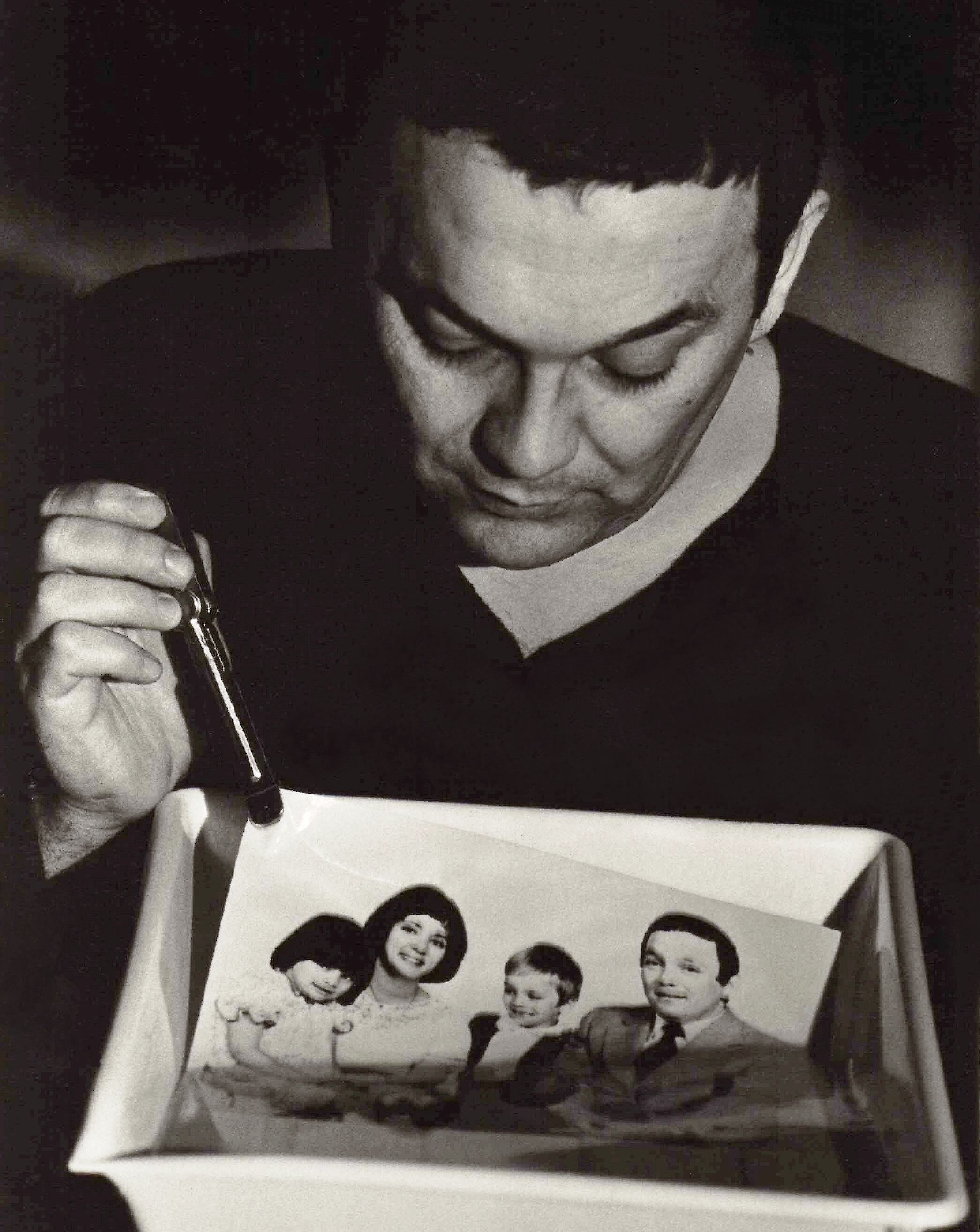
A black and white photographic print in a tray while being processed after exposure to light under a photographic enlarger. Typically three trays are used containing either developer, stop bath, or fixer, in that order. The print must then be rinsed in water to remove the fixer.

Photographic fixer is a chemical, or mixture of chemicals, used as the final step in the photographic processing of film or paper. The fixer stabilises the image, removing the unexposed light-sensitive material from the media, and making it insensitive to further action by light.

In the gelatin silver process, the basis for all film photography, exposed silver halides are reduced to metallic silver by the developer, forming the image. Once development is complete, remaining silver halides are removed from the film or photographic paper by the fixer, typically sodium or ammonium thiosulfate. Without fixing, the remaining silver halide would darken and cause fogging of the image.

== History ==
In 1819 the scientist John Herschel discovered that "hyposulphite of soda" (hypo), now called sodium thiosulfate, dissolves silver salts that are otherwise insoluble. The first photogenic drawings made by Henry Fox Talbot were only partially stabilised with a solution of common salt. In 1839 Herschel proposed hypo as a more permanent fixing agent; Talbot used it for most of his prints from the early 1840s, and it is still used as a fixer for black-and-white photographs.

== Chemistry ==
Fixation is commonly achieved by treating the film or paper with a solution of thiosulfate salt. Popular salts are sodium thiosulfate—commonly called hypo—and ammonium thiosulfate—commonly used in modern rapid fixer formulae. Fixation by thiosulfate involves these chemical reactions (X = halide, typically Br^{−}):

AgX + 2 S_{2}O_{3}^{2−} → [Ag(S_{2}O_{3})_{2}]^{3−} + X^{−}
AgX + 3 S_{2}O_{3}^{2−} → [Ag(S_{2}O_{3})_{3}]^{5−} + X^{−}

In addition to thiosulphate the fixer typically contains mildly acidic compounds to adjust the pH and suppress trace amounts of the developer. This compound is often an alkali hydrogen sulfite (bisulfite) which also serves to preserve the thiosulphate. Less commonly it may also contain other additives e.g. for the hardening of gelatin. There are also non-thiosulphate fixers, at least for special purposes. Fixer is used for processing all commonly used films, including black-and-white films, Kodachrome, and chromogenic films.

== Chromogenic films ==
In chromogenic films and papers the final image is formed by dyes, so both the metallic silver produced during development and the remaining silver halide have to be removed. In Kodak's C-41 process for colour negative film this is done in two separate steps: a bleach converts the developed silver back into silver halide, and a fixer then converts the silver halide into soluble silver complexes. The RA-4 process for colour paper instead uses a single bleach-fix bath, sometimes shortened to blix, which stops development, converts the metallic silver into silver halide and dissolves it. Bleach-fix formulations typically use a ferric salt of an aminopolycarboxylic acid, such as ammonium ferric EDTA, as the bleaching agent and a water-soluble thiosulfate as the fixing agent.

== Washing and stabilisation ==
After fixation, washing is important to remove the exhausted chemicals from the emulsion. If fixing is incomplete or washing inadequate, the residual compounds can cause black-and-white tones to turn yellow and brown, and sulfur-containing compounds left in the material may react with the finely divided image silver, particularly at high humidity and temperature. For maximum permanence the Canadian Conservation Institute recommends two successive fixing baths, because silver thiosulfate complexes left after a single bath dissolve only in fresh fixer and cannot be removed by washing. Washing aids, also called hypo clearing agents, are salt solutions that make the fixing salts easier to remove and so shorten the washing time. Toning the silver image, for example in selenium or sepia toners, generally increases its permanence further.
