= Ammonium thiosulfate =

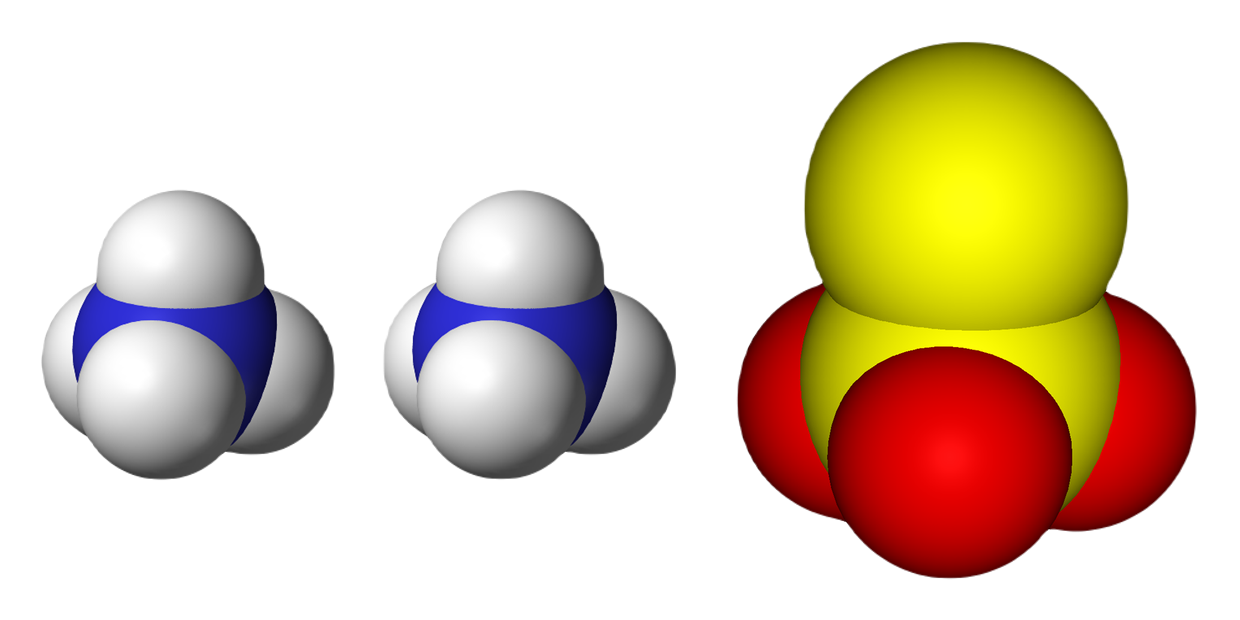

Names
- IUPAC name Diammonium thiosulfate
- Other names Ammonium thiosulphate, ATS

Identifiers
CAS Number	7783-18-8
3D model (JSmol)	Interactive image
ChEBI	CHEBI:147402
ChemSpider	4807475
ECHA InfoCard	100.029.074
PubChem CID	6096946
UNII	BKH1729645
CompTox Dashboard (EPA)	DTXSID6029703
- InChI: InChI=1S/2H3N.H2O3S2/c;;1-5(2,3)4/h2*1H3;(H2,1,2,3,4) Key: XYXNTHIYBIDHGM-UHFFFAOYSA-N; InChI=1S/2H3N.H2O3S2/c;;1-5(2,3)4/h2*1H3;(H2,1,2,3,4)
- SMILES: [O-]S([O-])(=O)=S.[NH4+].[NH4+]

Properties
Chemical formula	[NH_{4}]_{2}S_{2}O_{3}
Molar mass	148.20 g·mol^{−1}
Appearance	colorless or white, hygroscopic solid
Density	1.679 g/cm^{3}
Melting point	decomposes at 100 °C
Solubility in water	173 g/100 mL (20 °C)
Solubility	slightly soluble in acetone insoluble in alcohol

Structure
Crystal structure	monoclinic

Hazards
- Lethal dose or concentration (LD, LC)
LD_{50} (median dose)	2980 mg/kg (rat, oral)
- Except where otherwise noted, data are given for materials in their standard state (at 25 °C [77 °F], 100 kPa). verify (what is ?) Infobox references

Ammonium thiosulfate (ammonium thiosulphate in British English) is an inorganic compound with the formula [NH_{4}]_{2}S_{2}O_{3}. It is white crystalline solid with ammonia odor, readily soluble in water, slightly soluble in acetone and insoluble in ethanol and diethyl ether.

== Production ==
It is produced by treating ammonium sulfite with sulfur at temperatures between 85 and 110 °C:

[NH_{4}]_{2}SO_{3} + S → [NH_{4}]_{2}S_{2}O_{3}

== Applications ==
Ammonium thiosulfate is used in photographic fixer. It is a so-called rapid fixer, acting more quickly than sodium thiosulfate fixers. Fixation involves these chemical reactions (illustrated for silver bromide):

AgBr + 2 [NH_{4}]_{2}S_{2}O_{3} → [NH_{4}]_{3}[Ag(S_{2}O_{3})_{2}] + [NH_{4}]Br
AgBr + 3 [NH_{4}]_{2}S_{2}O_{3} → [NH_{4}]_{5}[Ag(S_{2}O_{3})_{3}] + [NH_{4}]Br

Also exploiting the stability of thiosulfate coordination complexes, ammonium thiosulfate is also used for leaching of gold and silver. It works with presence of copper as a catalyst. This process is a nontoxic alternative gold cyanidation. The advantage to ammonium thiosulfate is that the pyrolysis of its silver complexes leaves a residue solely of silver sulfide, in contrast to complexes derived from sodium thiosulfate.

=== Other ===
Ammonium thiosulfate can be used as a fertilizer. As suggested by some research studies, it can also be used as an additive to coal-waste mixtures to reduce formation of dioxins and furans during combustion.

== Safety ==
The LD_{50} (oral, rat) is 2890 mg/kg.

== See also ==
- Thiosulfate
- Sodium thiosulfate
- Ammonium sulfate
