= Photographic developer =

Chemical(s) which convert a latent image on photographic film to a visible image

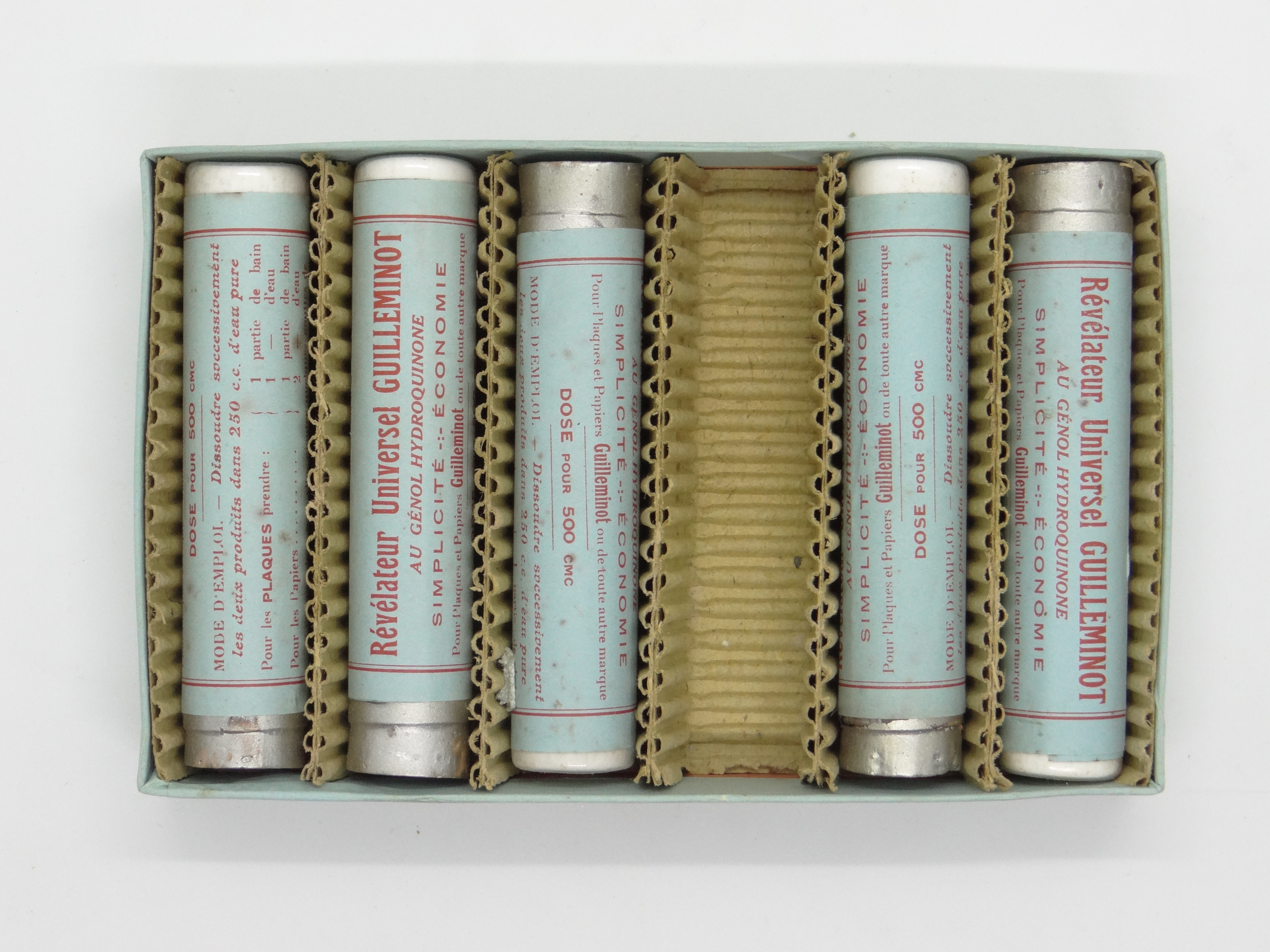
Developer powder using genol-hydroquinone.

In the processing of photographic films, plates and papers, a developer is a chemical solution that converts the latent image to a visible image. This may be a negative image, with the emulsion darkened by light, requiring a further imaging process to produce a print where highlights and shadows are not reversed, or a positive image which can be viewed or projected. In the gelatin silver process, the developer achieves this conversion by reducing the silver halides, which are pale-colored, into silver metal, which is black when in the form of fine particles.

Although the developer will react with all grains of silver halide, it acts much more quickly on those that have been exposed to light, which is how it produces an image: when left in developer, all the silver halides will eventually be reduced and turn black. The longer a developer is allowed to work, the darker the image. To produce a usable image, development must be stopped at the appropriate time.

The following sections first describe monochrome, black-and-white, development, then colour processes which add coloured dyes to the silver blackening process.

== Chemical composition of developers ==
=== Main components ===
The developer typically consists of a mixture of chemical compounds prepared as an aqueous solution. For black-and-white photography, three main components of this mixture are:^{:115}

- Developing agents such as metol (monomethyl-p-aminophenol hemisulfate), phenidone (1-phenyl-3-pyrazolidinone), dimezone (4,4-dimethyl-1-phenylpyrazolidin-3-one) and hydroquinone (benzene-1,4-diol). Dimezone is thought to resist oxidation in solution better than Phenidone A, but it is not as available as Phenidone A. Dimezone is also known as Phenidone B.
- Alkaline agents such as sodium carbonate, borax, or sodium hydroxide to raise the pH.
- Sodium sulfite to delay oxidation of the developing agents by atmospheric oxygen.

Notable standard formulas include Eastman Kodak D-76 film developer, D-72 print developer, and D-96 motion picture negative developer.

Hydroquinone is superadditive with metol, meaning that it acts to "recharge" the metol after it has been oxidised in the process of reducing silver in the emulsion. Sulfite in a developer not only acts to prevent aerial oxidation of the developing agents in solution, it also facilitates the regeneration of metol by hydroquinone (reducing compensation and adjacency effects) and in high enough concentrations acts as a silver halide solvent.

As well as the developing agent, the activator and the preservative, most developers contain small amounts of potassium bromide to modify and restrain the action of the developer to suppress chemical fogging. Developers for high contrast work have higher concentrations of hydroquinone and lower concentrations of metol and tend to use strong alkalis such as sodium hydroxide to increase the pH up to around 11 to 12.

Developers also contain a water softening agent to prevent calcium scum formation (e.g., EDTA salts, sodium tripolyphosphate, NTA salts, etc.).

Metol is difficult to dissolve in solutions of high salt content and instructions for mixing developer formulae therefore almost always list metol first. It is important to dissolve chemicals in the order in which they are listed. Some photographers add a pinch of sodium sulfite before dissolving the metol to prevent oxidation, but large amounts of sulfite in solution will make the metol very slow to dissolve.

Because metol is relatively toxic and can cause skin sensitisation, modern commercial developers often use phenidone or dimezone S (4-hydroxymethyl-4-methyl-1-phenyl-3-pyrazolidone) instead. Dimezone, Dimezone S, is a white crystalline powder that is soluble in water and polar solvents. DD-X, HC-110, TMax developer, and PQ Universal developer are a few common film developers that use Dimezone as a developing agent. Dimezone is acutely toxic and an irritant. Hydroquinone can also be toxic to the human operator as well as environment; some modern developers replace it with ascorbic acid, or vitamin C. This, however, suffers from poor stability. Ascorbate developers may have the advantage of being compensating and sharpness-enhancing, as oxidation by-products formed during development are acidic, meaning they retard development in and adjacent to areas of high activity. This also explains why ascorbate developers have poor keeping properties, as oxidised ascorbate is both ineffective as a developing agent and lowers the pH of the solution, making the remaining developing agents less active. Recently, claims for practical methods to improve the stability of ascorbate developers have been made by several experimenters.

=== Other developing agents ===
Other developing agents in use are p-aminophenol, glycin (N-(4-hydroxyphenyl)glycine), pyrogallol, and catechol. When used in low sulfite developer composition, the latter two compounds cause gelatin to harden and stain in the vicinity of developing grains. Generally, the optical density of the stain increases in the heavily exposed (and heavily developed) area. This is a property that is highly sought after by some photographers because it increases negative contrast in relation to density, meaning that highlight detail can be captured without "blocking" (reaching high enough density that detail and tonality are severely compromised). Hydroquinone shares this property. However, the staining effect only appears in solutions with very little sulfite, and most hydroquinone developers contain substantial quantities of sulfite.

In the early days of photography, a wide range of developing agents were used, including chlorohydroquinone, ferrous oxalate,^{:131} hydroxylamine, ferrous lactate, ferrous citrate, Eikonogen, atchecin, antipyrin, acetanilid and Amidol (which unusually required mildly acidic conditions).

=== Lithographic developers ===
The original lithographic developer was based upon a low sulfite/bisulfite developer with formaldehyde (added as the powder paraformaldehyde). The very low sulfite, high hydroquinone and high alkalinity encouraged "infectious development" (exposed developing silver halide crystals collided with unexposed silver halide crystals, causing them to also reduce) which enhanced the edge effect in line images. These high energy developers had a short tray life, but when used within their tray life provided consistent usable results.

Modern lithographic developers contain hydrazine compounds, tetrazolium compounds and other amine contrast boosters to increase contrast without relying on the classic hydroquinone-only lithographic developer formulation. The modern formulae are very similar to rapid access developers (except for those additives) and therefore they enjoy long tray life. However, classic lithographic developers using hydroquinone alone suffer very poor tray life and inconsistent results.

== Development ==
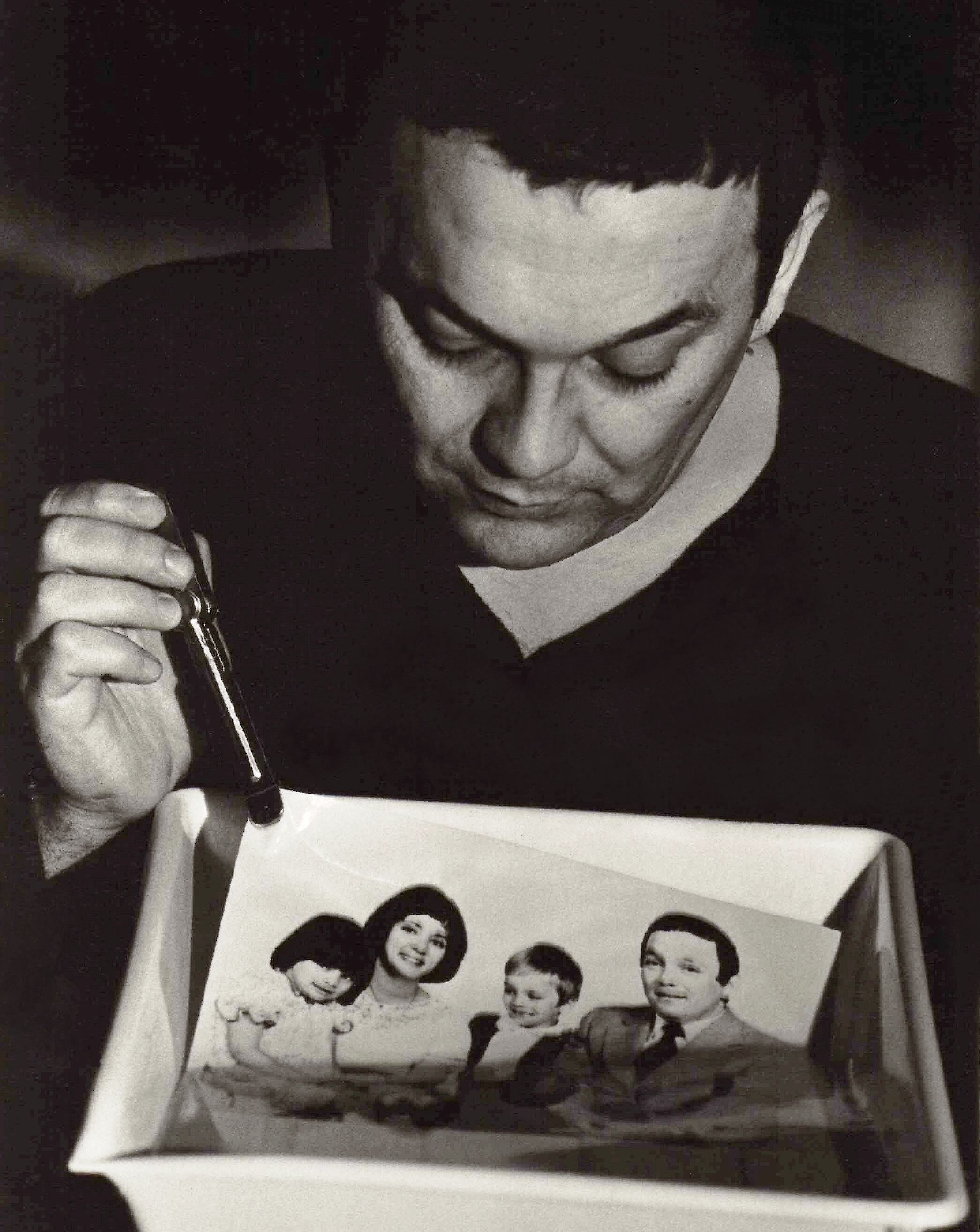
A black and white photographic print in a tray while being processed after exposure to light under a photographic enlarger. Typically three trays are used containing either developer, stop bath, or fixer, in that order. The print must then be rinsed in water to remove the fixer.

The developer selectively reduces silver halide crystals in the emulsion to metallic silver, but only those having latent image centres created by action of light. The light sensitive layer or emulsion consists of silver halide crystals in a gelatin base. Two photons of light must be absorbed by one silver halide crystal to form a stable two atom silver metal crystal. The developer used generally will only reduce silver halide crystals that have an existing silver crystal. Faster exposure or lower light level films usually have larger grains because those images capture less light. Fine grain films, like Kodachrome, require more light to increase the chance that the halide crystal will absorb at least two quanta of light as they have a smaller cross sectional size. Therefore, silver halide crystal size is proportional to film speed. The metallic silver image has dark (black) appearance.

=== Fixing ===
Once the desired level of reduction is achieved the development process is halted by washing in a dilute acid and then the undeveloped silver halide is removed by dissolving it in a thiosulfate solution, a process called fixing. Some developers, such as Diafine, work as two-bath (divided) developers. The film is first soaked in a solution of the developing agents, which is absorbed by the gelatin, and is then drained without rinsing and transferred to an alkaline second bath that activates the developer. The areas with the most light exposure use up the small amount of developer held in the gelatin and stop developing before they become fully opaque, while the less exposed areas continue to develop, so the developer compensates for high contrast. According to its manufacturer, Diafine develops each film type to a fixed degree of contrast, is used at 70–85 °F (21–29 °C) with at least three minutes in each bath, gives no practical change in results with longer times, and allows fast, medium and slow films to be developed together without adjusting the developing time.

=== Sensitometry ===
The time over which development takes place, and the type of developer, affect the relationship between the density of silver in the developed image and the quantity of light. This study is called sensitometry and was pioneered by F Hurter & V C Driffield in the late 19th century.

== Colour development ==
There are two types of colour film: negative film, which produces a non-viewable colour negative which can then be used to produce viewable colour prints, and reversal film, which produces transparencies (slides) with correct colours that can be projected.

Colour photographic development reduces silver as in black-and-white development, but the reduction of silver also simultaneously oxidizes the paraphenylene colour developing agent which then takes part in the production of dye-stuffs in the emulsion by reacting with the appropriate couplers. Three distinct processes are used for different types of colour film.

=== Negative film development ===
The C-41 process is used for almost all colour negative films; in this process dye couplers in the emulsion react with the oxidized colour developing agent in the developer solution to generate the visible dyes. An almost identical process is then used to produce colour prints from films. The developing agents used are derivates of paraphenylene diamine.

In colour negative films, there are 3 types of dye couplers. There are the normal cyan, magenta and yellow dye forming couplers, but also there is a magenta coloured cyan masking coupler and a yellow coloured magenta masking coupler. These form respectively normal cyan dye, and magenta dye, but form an orange positive mask to correct colour. In addition, there is a third type of coupler called a DIR (Developer Inhibitor Release) coupler. This coupler releases a powerful inhibitor during dye formation, which affects edge effects and causes effects between layers to enhance overall image quality.

=== Reversal film development ===
In Ektachrome-type (E-6 process) transparencies, the film is first processed in an unusual developer containing phenidone and Hydroquinone-monosulfonate. This black and white developer is used for 6:00 at 100.4°F (38°C), with more time yielding "push" processing to increase the apparent film speed by reducing the Dmax, or maximum density. The first developer is the most critical step in Process E-6. The solution is essentially a black-and-white film developer, because it forms only a negative silver image in each layer of the film; no dye images are yet formed. Then, the film goes directly into the first wash for 2:00 at 100 °F, which acts as a controlled stop bath. Next, the film goes into the reversal bath. This step prepares the film for the colour developer step. In this reversal bath, a chemical reversal agent is absorbed into the emulsion, with no chemical reaction taking place until the film enters the colour developer. The reversal process can also be carried out using 800 footcandle-seconds of light, which is used by process engineers to troubleshoot reversal bath chemistry problems.

Next, the film is developed to completion in the colour developer bath, which contains CD-3 as the colour developing agent. When film enters the colour developer, the reversal agent absorbed by the emulsion in the reversal bath chemically fogs (or "exposes") the unexposed silver halide (if it has not already been fogged by light in the previous step). The colour developer acts on the chemically exposed silver halide to form a positive silver image. However, the metallic silver image formed in the first developer, which is a negative image, is not a part of the reaction that takes place in this step. What is being reacted in this stage is the "leftover" of the negative image, that is, a positive image. As the colour development progresses, metallic silver image is formed, but more importantly, the colour developing agent is oxidised. Oxidised colour developer molecules react with the couplers to form colour dyes in situ. Thus colour dye is formed at the site of development in each of the three layers of the film. Each layer of the film contains different couplers, which react with the same oxidised developer molecules but form different colour dyes. Next, the film goes into the pre-bleach (formerly conditioner) bath, which has a precursor of formaldehyde (as a dye preservative) and EDTA to "kick off" the bleach. Next, the film goes into a bleach solution. The bleach converts metallic silver into silver bromide, which is converted to soluble silver compounds in the fixer. The C-41 color negative process introduced in 1972 uses ferric EDTA. Reversal processes have used ferric EDTA at least since the introduction of the E-6 process in 1976. For Kodachrome ferric EDTA is used at least in the current K-14 process. During bleaching, ferric EDTA is changed to ferrous EDTA before fixing, and final wash.

Fe^{3+}EDTA + Ag + Br^{−} → Fe^{2+}EDTA + AgBr

Previously potassium ferricyanide was often used as bleach. The most common processing chemistry for such films is E6, derived from a long line of developers produced for the Ektachrome range of films.

Ektachrome papers are also available.

Standard black and white stock can also be reversal processed to give black and white slides. After 'first development,' the initial silver image is then removed (e.g. using a potassium bichromate/sulfuric acid bleach, which requires a subsequent "clearing bath" to remove the chromate stain from the film). The unfixed film is then fogged (physically or chemically) and 'second-developed'. However, the process works best with slow films such as Ilford Pan-F processed to give a high gamma. Kodak's chemistry kit for reversing Panatomic-X ("Direct Positive Film Developing Outfit") used sodium bisulfate in place of sulfuric acid in the bleach, and used a fogging developer that was inherently unstable, and had to be mixed and used within a two-hour period. (If two rolls, the maximum capacity of a single pint of redeveloper, were to be processed in succession, the redeveloper had to be mixed while the first roll was in the first developer.)

=== Proprietary processes ===
The K-14 process for Kodachrome films involved adding all the dyes to the emulsion during development. Special equipment was needed to process Kodachrome. Since 2010, there has been no commercial entity that processes Kodachrome anywhere in the world.

In colour print development the Ilfochrome, or Cibachrome, process uses a print material with the dye-stuffs present and which are bleached out in appropriate places during developing. The chemistry involved here is wholly different from C41 chemistry, using azo-dyes which are much more resistant to fading with prolonged exposure to light.

== Other sources ==
- The British Journal (1956). Photographic Almanac. London, England: Henry Greenwood and Company Limited.
- Langford, M. J. (1980). Advanced Photography. London, England: Focal Press.
