= Pyrogallol =

Benzene-1,2,3-triol

- Structural formula

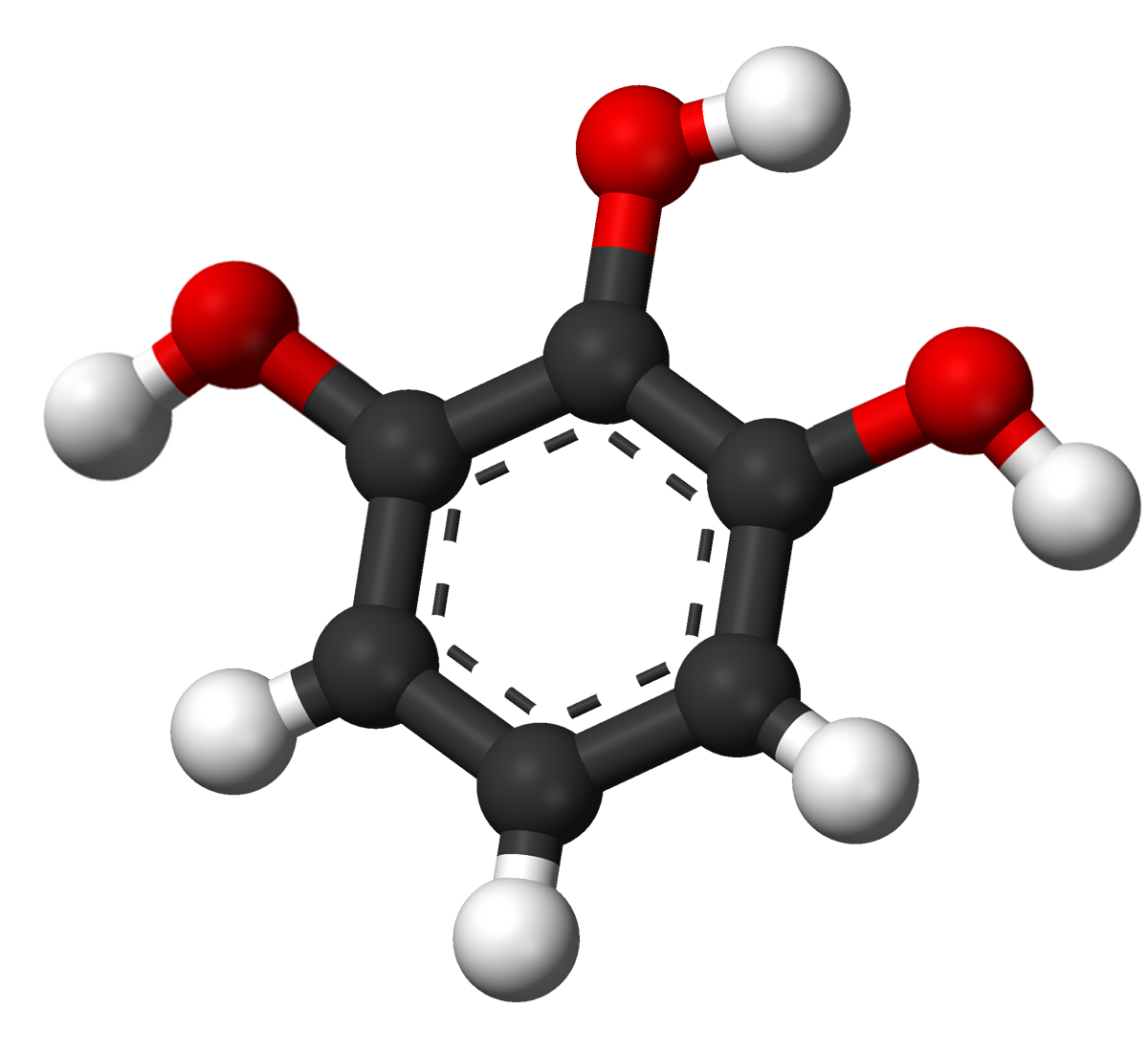
- Ball-and-stick model

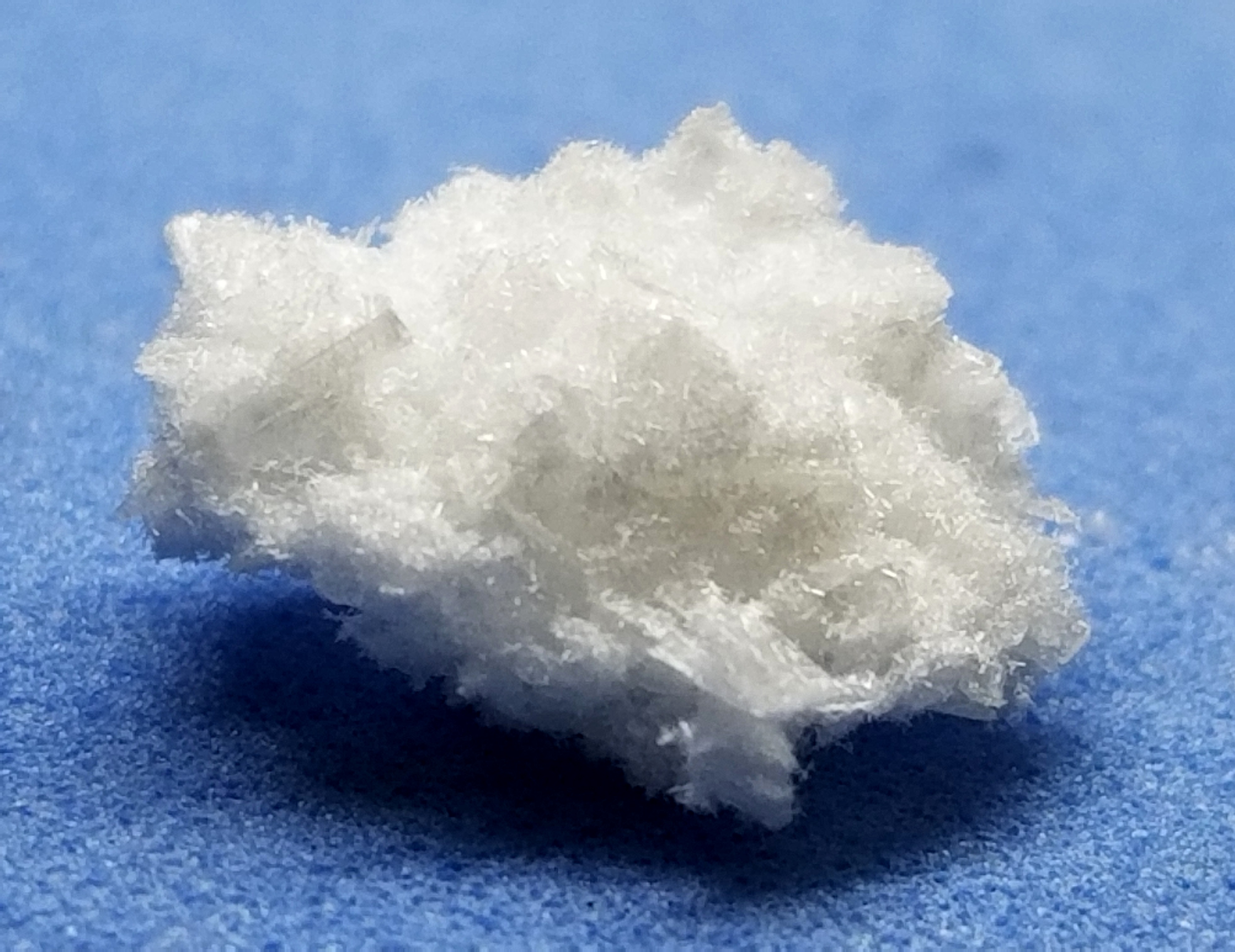

Names
- Preferred IUPAC name Benzene-1,2,3-triol
- Other names 1,2,3-Trihydroxybenzene; Pyrogallic acid 1,2,3-Benzenetriol

Identifiers
CAS Number	87-66-1
3D model (JSmol)	Interactive image
ChEBI	CHEBI:16164
ChEMBL	ChEMBL307145
ChemSpider	13835557
ECHA InfoCard	100.001.603
EC Number	201-762-9
KEGG	C01108
PubChem CID	1057
RTECS number	UX2800000
UNII	01Y4A2QXY0
UN number	2811
CompTox Dashboard (EPA)	DTXSID6025983
- InChI: InChI=1S/C6H6O3/c7-4-2-1-3-5(8)6(4)9/h1-3,7-9H Key: WQGWDDDVZFFDIG-UHFFFAOYSA-N; InChI=1/C6H6O3/c7-4-2-1-3-5(8)6(4)9/h1-3,7-9H Key: WQGWDDDVZFFDIG-UHFFFAOYAT
- SMILES: Oc1cccc(O)c1O

Properties
Chemical formula	C_{6}H_{6}O_{3}
Molar mass	126.111 g·mol^{−1}
Density	1.453 g/cm^{3} (4 °C)
Melting point	125.5 °C (257.9 °F; 398.6 K)
Boiling point	307 °C (585 °F; 580 K)
Refractive index (n_{D})	1.561 (134 °C)

Structure
Crystal structure	Monoclinic
Space group	P2_{1}/n
Lattice constant	a = 12.1144(11) Å, b = 3.7765(3) Å, c = 13.1365(12) Å α = 90°, β = 115.484(1)°, γ = 90°
Formula units (Z)	4

Hazards
- GHS labelling
Pictograms	(GHS07: Exclamation mark) (GHS08: Health hazard)
Signal word	Warning
Hazard statements	H302, H312, H332, H341, H412
Precautionary statements	P201, P202, P261, P264, P270, P271, P273, P280, P281, P301+P312, P302+P352, P304+P312, P304+P340, P308+P313, P312, P322, P330, P363, P405, P501
- Except where otherwise noted, data are given for materials in their standard state (at 25 °C [77 °F], 100 kPa). verify (what is ?) Infobox references

Pyrogallol is an organic compound with the formula C_{6}H_{3}(OH)_{3}. It is a water-soluble, white solid although samples are typically brownish because of its sensitivity toward oxygen. It is one of three isomers of benzenetriols.

== Production and reactions ==
It is produced in the manner first reported by Scheele in 1786: heating gallic acid to induce decarboxylation.

Gallic acid is also obtained from tannin. Many alternative routes have been devised. One preparation involves treating para-chlorophenoldisulfonic acid with potassium hydroxide, a variant on the time-honored route to phenols from sulfonic acids.

Polyhydroxybenzenes are relatively electron-rich. One manifestation is the easy C-acetylation of pyrogallol.

== Uses ==
It was once used in hair dyeing, dyeing of suturing materials. It also has antiseptic properties.

In alkaline solution, pyrogallol undergoes deprotonation. Such solutions absorb oxygen from the air, turning brown. This conversion can be used to determine the amount of oxygen in a gas sample, notably by the use of the Orsat apparatus. Alkaline solutions of pyrogallol have been used for oxygen absorption in gas analysis.

=== Use in photography ===
Pyrogallol was also used as a developing agent in the 19th and early 20th centuries in black-and-white developers. Hydroquinone is more commonly used today. Its use is largely historical except for special purpose applications. It was still used by a few notable photographers including Edward Weston. In those days it had a reputation for erratic and unreliable behavior, due possibly to its propensity for oxidation. It experienced a revival starting in the 1980s due largely to the efforts of experimenters Gordon Hutchings and John Wimberley. Hutchings spent over a decade working on pyrogallol formulas, eventually producing one he named PMK for its main ingredients: pyrogallol, Metol, and Kodalk (the trade name of Kodak for sodium metaborate). This formulation resolved the consistency issues, and Hutchings found that an interaction between the greenish stain given to film by pyro developers and the color sensitivity of modern variable-contrast photographic papers gave the effect of an extreme compensating developer. From 1969 to 1977, Wimberley experimented with the Pyrogallol developing agent. He published his formula for WD2D in 1977 in Petersen's Photographic. PMK and other modern pyro formulations are now used by many black-and-white photographers. The Film Developing Cookbook has examples.

Another developer mainly based on pyrogallol was formulated by Jay DeFehr. The 510-pyro, is a concentrate that uses triethanolamine as alkali, and pyrogallol, ascorbic acid, and phenidone as combined developers in a single concentrated stock solution with long shelf life. This developer has both staining and tanning properties and negatives developed with it are immune to the callier effect. It can be used for small and large negative formats.

The Darkroom Cookbook (Alternative Process Photography) has examples.

== Safety ==
Pyrogallol use, e.g. in hair dye formulations, is declining because of concerns about its toxicity. Its LD_{50} (oral, rat) is 300 mg/kg.

Pure pyrogallol was found to be extremely genotoxic when inserted into cultured cells, but α amylase proteins protect against its toxicity during everyday exposure.

== See also ==
- Catechol
- Gallacetophenone (2,3,4-trihydroxyacetophenone)
- Gallic acid
- Syringol
