= Xtol =

Photographic developer

Xtol is a photographic developer manufactured by Eastman Kodak company.

Xtol is one of the few developers that do not contain hydroquinone. It uses derivatives of ascorbic acid (vitamin C) and phenidone as developing agents. Claimed advantages include low toxicity (important for environmental reasons as well as occupational safety), easy mixing, and an unusual combination of fine grain with high film speed.

Xtol was covered by a US patent until its expiry in 2016. It is sold by Kodak in a powdered form to make 5 litres of developer. A similar formula, compatible with Xtol in terms of developing times and the resulting contrast curves, is sold by Adox under the name XT-3 in powder packages for 1 or 5 litres of developing solution.
