= Superadditive developer =

Photographic development agent

Photographic developer solutions may contain more than one developing agents, such as Metol and hydroquinone, or Phenidone and hydroquinone. These combinations exhibit a synergistic effect known as superadditivity, in which their combined developing activity exceeds the sum of their individual activities.

== Definition ==
Superadditive development commonly means that the mathematical superadditive inequality holds for the rate of development. That is, the rate of development of the two (or more) agents together is greater than the sum of the rate of each agent used alone.

There are cases that density superadditivity holds without rate superadditivity. Note that the term superadditive development is usually not used to mean density superadditivity: the image density obtained from the combined agents is greater than the sum of the density from each agent used alone.

== Mechanism ==
There were several historical theories about the mechanism of superadditive development, until G. I. P. Levenson elucidated the regeneration mechanism. It is useful to review modern treatment of the development mechanism described as an electrode process.

Of the two developing agents that are superadditive, the following is usually the case:

1. Agent 1 has lower reduction potential but much higher adsorption to the silver halide crystals.
2. Agent 2 has higher reduction potential but much poorer adsorption to the silver halide crystals.

Agent 1 is the developer that reduces the silver halide crystals. Oxidation product of Agent 1 is reduced back to the original form by Agent 2. In other words, the ultimate source of the electrons used to develop image comes from Agent 2. For this reason, in modern convention, Agent 1 is usually called electron transferring agent or ETA. Agent 2 is usually called the main developing agent.

As obvious from the above mechanism, developing agent with very stable semiquinone radical form (the first oxidized form of the ETA) tends to make more superadditive combination. Also obvious from the above mechanism is that Agent 1 has to have an intermediate reduction potential in the developer solution between the Fermi energy level of silver (the developing image silver) and the reduction potential of Agent 2 in the developer solution.

Examples of Agent 1 include: Phenidone, Dimezone S, Metol, p-aminophenol, glycin, Eikonogen. These agents have nitrogen atoms that give strong affinity to silver halide (argentophilic) as well as hydrophobic end, effectively acting as a surfactant between the developer solution and silver halide crystals.

Examples of Agent 2 include: hydroquinone and ascorbic acid. These agents have stronger reduction potentials than those of Agent 1 group, but they have very poor adsorption on silver halide crystals, due to lack of argentophilic end.

However, there are many developer combinations that exhibit superadditive development.
