= Iron citrate =

Iron citrate may refer to:

- Iron(II) citrate
- Iron(III) citrate
