= C19H24O4 =

The molecular formula C_{19}H_{24}O_{4} (molar mass: 316.39 g/mol, exact mass: 316.1675 u) may refer to:

- DHSA
- Ferujol
