= FX-55 (film developer) =

FX-55 is an 'eco-friendly' photographic developer for monochrome film devised by Geoffrey Crawley. It was first published in Amateur Photographer.

It provides an alternative to Phenidone with Hydroquinone developers. Hydroquinone, like other benzene, derivatives can cause skin problems and is undesirable in quantity effluent

== General Characteristics ==
An exposure index of about 0.5-1EV over the ISO rating is usually possible.

FX-55 has good over and underexposure characteristics, with a low background fog level. The fine, even grain produced is beneficial for digital scanning. FX-55 is particularly suitable for high-tech grain films which normally have less underexposure latitude than the traditional types such as Ilford Pan F+, FP4+ and HP5+ films and Kodak Plus X and Tri-X Pan.

The creator did not assert copyright over this formula, which may be reproduced providing Amateur Photographer is cited as the source.

== Formula ==
=== A ===
Potassium carbonate: 20g
Sodium bicarbonate: 1.5g
Sodium sulfite: 25g
Sodium metabisulphite: 12g
Water to 1000ml

Dilute 1+9 for the working solution (e.g., 30ml makes 300ml). Before use add B to the 1+9 diluted A solution to form the working strength developer.

=== B ===
Sodium L-ascorbate: 1.3g
Phenidone: 100mg (0.1g)

Add to 1,000ml of A, already diluted 1+9

== Use ==
B is best added to working strength A shortly before use at around 20°C (68°F). The ascorbate dissolves immediately, the Phenidone more slowly; crush any small lumps before adding. If left standing for a few minutes, the powder is penetrated by water and dissolves more easily.

A keeps indefinitely in a closed container. The combined A+B has a short working life. Unused working solution will keep its properties for a maximum of 36 hours, if kept in a closed container. Use the working solution once, then discard.

Stock solution may be made up in tap water though 'purified water' is preferred as helps with the short stability of the working solution. Do not use battery top-up water.

== Developing times ==
The following developing times (minutes at 20°C (68°F), four spiral tank inversions per minute) will yield negatives of enlarging quality (contrast index CI=0.58-0.60). Negatives intended for scanning can benefit from a higher CI. A CI of around 0.65 may be obtained by reducing the sodium metabisulphite in A to 10g, or by increasing the developing times by about 10%.

AGFA
APX 25: 9
APX 100: 10½
APX 400: 12

FUJIFILM
Acros 100: 11
Neopan 400: 16½
Neopan 1600: 15½

ILFORD
Pan F+: 7
FP4+: 8½
HP5+: 13½
Delta 100: 10
Delta 400: 12½
Delta 3200: 12½
SFX: 14

KODAK
Plus-X Pro: 8
Tri-X Pan: 12½
T-Max 100: 13
T-Max 400: 14½
T-Max 3200: 17½
High speed IR: 16
Tech Pan: 6

KONICA
Infra Red: 14
