= Bailey peptide synthesis =

Organic chemistry

The Bailey peptide synthesis is a name reaction in organic chemistry developed 1949 by J. L. Bailey. It is a method for the synthesis of a peptide from α-amino acid-N-carboxylic acid anhydrides (NCAs) and amino acids or peptide esters. The reaction is characterized by short reaction times and a high yield of the target peptide.

The reaction can be carried out at low temperatures in organic solvents. The residues R^{1} and R^{2} can be organic groups or hydrogen atoms, R^{3} is the used amino acid or peptide ester:

Übersichtsreaktion der Bailey-Peptid-Synthese

== Reaction mechanism ==
The reaction mechanism is not known in detail. Supposedly, the reaction begins with a nucleophilic attack of the amino group on the carbonyl carbon of the anhydride group of the N-carboxylic acid anhydride (1). After an intramolecular proton migration, a 1,4-proton shift and the cleavage of carbon dioxide follows, resulting in the peptide bond in the final product (2):

Übersichtsreaktion der Bailey-Peptid-Synthese

== Atom economy ==
The advantage in atom economy of using NCAs for peptide formation is that there is no need for a protecting group on the functional group reacted with the amino acid. For example, the Merrifield synthesis depends on the use of Boc and Bzl protecting groups, which need be removed after the reaction. In the case of Bailey peptide synthesis, the free peptide is directly obtained after the reaction. However, unwanted and difficult to remove by-products may be formed. An N-substitution of the NCA (for example, by an o-nitrophenylsulfenyl group) can simplify the subsequent purification process, but on the other hand deteriorates the atom economy of the reaction. The synthesis of NCAs can be carried out by the Leuchs reaction or by the reaction of N-(benzyloxycarbonyl)-amino acids with oxalyl chloride. In the latter case, again the procedure is less efficient in the sense of atom economy.

== Synthesized peptides ==
The following peptides were synthesized using this method by 1949:

- DL-Ala-Gly
- L-Tyr-Gly
- DL-Tyr-Tyr
- DL-Ala-DL-Ala-Gly
- DL-di-Ala-L-cystinyl-di-Gly
- DL-Ala-L-Tyr-Gly
- DL-Ala-L-Tyr-Gly-Gly
- DL-Ala-DL-Ala-L-Tyr-Gly-Gly
- L-Tyr-L-Tyr-L-Tyr
- L-Cystinyl-di-Gly

== Literature ==
- P. Katsoyannis: The Chemistry of Polypeptides. Springer Science & Business Media, 2012, ISBN 978-1-461-34571-8, S. 129.
