= CD-4 =

CD-4 or CD4 may refer to:

- CD4, a cell surface molecule present on leukocytes

- CD4^{+} cells, a type of T cell

- Color Developing Agent 4, a developing agent for color film
- Compatible Discrete 4, a quadraphonic phonograph record format developed by JVC
- Ford CD4 platform
