= Catechol oxidase (dimerizing) =

Enzyme

catechol oxidase (dimerizing)

Identifiers
- EC no.: 1.1.3.14
- CAS no.: 37250-83-2

Databases
- IntEnz: IntEnz view
- BRENDA: BRENDA entry
- ExPASy: NiceZyme view
- KEGG: KEGG entry
- MetaCyc: metabolic pathway
- PRIAM: profile
- PDB structures: RCSB PDB PDBe PDBsum
- Gene Ontology: AmiGO / QuickGO
Search
- PMC: articles
- PubMed: articles
- NCBI: proteins

In enzymology, catechol oxidase (dimerizing) (EC 1.1.3.14) is an enzyme that catalyzes the chemical reaction

Four catechol
3 O_{2}
6 H_{2}O
3 O_{2}
6 H_{2}O
Two dibenzo(1,4)dioxine-2,3-dione

The two substrates of this enzyme are catechol and oxygen. Its products are dibenzo(1,4)dioxin-2,3-dione and water.

This enzyme belongs to the family of oxidoreductases, specifically those acting on the CH-OH group of donor with oxygen as acceptor. The systematic name of this enzyme class is catechol:oxygen oxidoreductase (dimerizing).
