= Hydroquinone 1,2-dioxygenase =

Identifiers
- EC no.: 1.13.11.66

Databases
- IntEnz: IntEnz view
- BRENDA: BRENDA entry
- ExPASy: NiceZyme view
- KEGG: KEGG entry
- MetaCyc: metabolic pathway
- PRIAM: profile
- PDB structures: RCSB PDB PDBe PDBsum
Search
- PMC: articles
- PubMed: articles
- NCBI: proteins

Hydroquinone 1,2-dioxygenase (EC 1.13.11.66, hydroquinone dioxygenase) is an enzyme with systematic name benzene-1,4-diol:oxygen 1,2-oxidoreductase (decyclizing). This enzyme catalyses the following chemical reaction

hydroquinone
O_{2}
cis,trans-4-hydroxymuconic semialdehyde

The enzyme is an extradiol-type dioxygenase. It belongs to the nonheme-iron(II)-dependent dioxygenase family.
