= Trans-1,2-dihydrobenzene-1,2-diol dehydrogenase =

Class of enzymes

trans-1,2-dihydrobenzene-1,2-diol dehydrogenase

Identifiers
- EC no.: 1.3.1.20
- CAS no.: 37255-32-6

Databases
- IntEnz: IntEnz view
- BRENDA: BRENDA entry
- ExPASy: NiceZyme view
- KEGG: KEGG entry
- MetaCyc: metabolic pathway
- PRIAM: profile
- PDB structures: RCSB PDB PDBe PDBsum
- Gene Ontology: AmiGO / QuickGO
Search
- PMC: articles
- PubMed: articles
- NCBI: proteins

In enzymology, trans-1,2-dihydrobenzene-1,2-diol dehydrogenase (EC 1.3.1.20) is an enzyme that catalyzes the chemical reaction

trans-1,2-dihydrocatechol
+ NADP^{+}
H^{+}
H^{+}
catechol
+ NADPH

The two substrates of this enzyme are trans-1,2-dihydrocatechol and oxidised nicotinamide adenine dinucleotide phosphate (NADP^{+}). Its products are catechol, reduced NADPH, and a proton.

This enzyme belongs to the family of oxidoreductases, specifically those acting on the CH-CH group of donor with NAD+ or NADP+ as acceptor. The systematic name of this enzyme class is trans-1,2-dihydrobenzene-1,2-diol:NADP+ oxidoreductase. This enzyme is also called dihydrodiol dehydrogenase. This enzyme participates in metabolism of xenobiotics by cytochrome p450.

== Structural studies ==
As of late 2007, 14 structures have been solved for this class of enzymes, with PDB accession codes 1RY0, 1RY8, 1S1P, 1S1R, 1S2A, 1S2C, 1XF0, 1ZQ5, 2F38, 2HDJ, 2IPJ, 2O48, 2O4U, and 2POQ.
