= CD 2 =

CD2 may refer to:

- CD2, (cluster of differentiation 2), a cell adhesion molecule
- Chlordiazepoxide, by the trade name CD 2
- CD-2, Color Developing Agent 2 - color film developer, used in photographic processing of Kodachrome film and ECP processes.
