= FX-55 =

FX-55 may refer to:

- A type of AMD Athlon 64 microprocessor
- An 'eco-friendly' monochrome photographic developer
