= Cyclic alcohol dehydrogenase (quinone) =

Identifiers
- EC no.: 1.1.5.7

Databases
- IntEnz: IntEnz view
- BRENDA: BRENDA entry
- ExPASy: NiceZyme view
- KEGG: KEGG entry
- MetaCyc: metabolic pathway
- PRIAM: profile
- PDB structures: RCSB PDB PDBe PDBsum
Search
- PMC: articles
- PubMed: articles
- NCBI: proteins

Cyclic alcohol dehydrogenase (quinone) (EC 1.1.5.7, cyclic alcohol dehydrogenase, MCAD) is an enzyme with systematic name cyclic alcohol:quinone oxidoreductase. This enzyme catalyses the following chemical reaction

cyclic alcohol + quinone $\rightleftharpoons$ cyclic ketone + quinol

This enzyme oxidizes a wide variety of cyclic alcohols.
