= Ribosyldihydronicotinamide dehydrogenase (quinone) =

dihydronicotinamide riboside quinone reductase
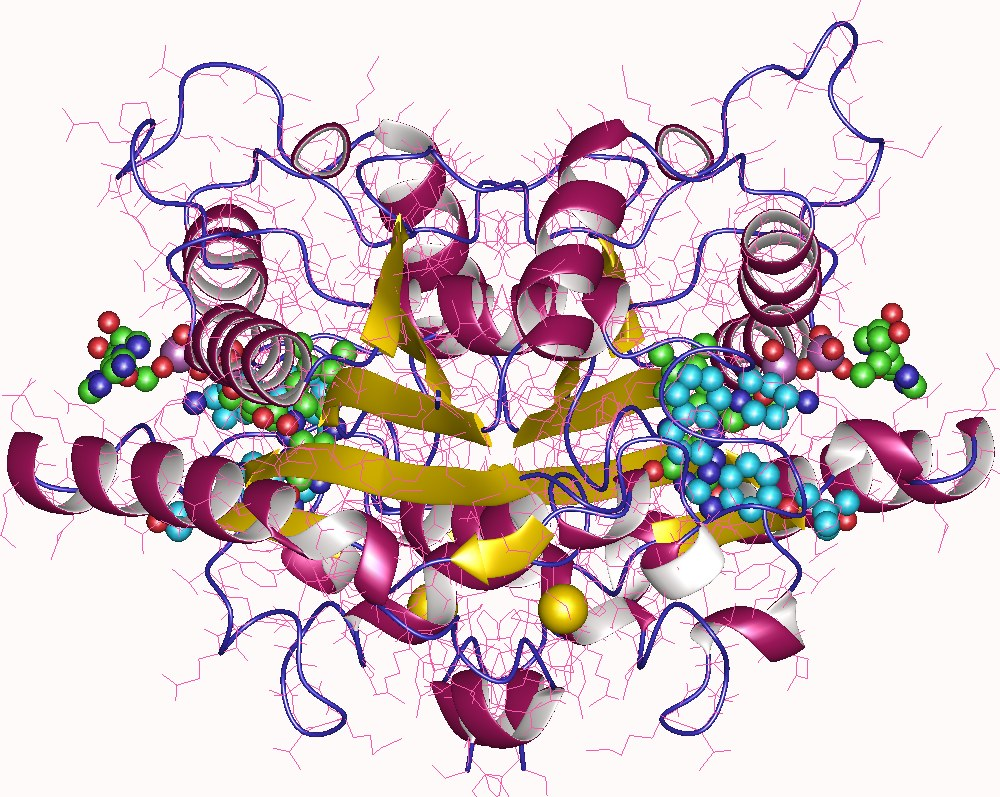
- Ribosyldihydronicotinamide dehydrogenase dimer, Human

Identifiers
- EC no.: 1.10.5.1

Databases
- IntEnz: IntEnz view
- BRENDA: BRENDA entry
- ExPASy: NiceZyme view
- KEGG: KEGG entry
- MetaCyc: metabolic pathway
- PRIAM: profile
- PDB structures: RCSB PDB PDBe PDBsum
- Gene Ontology: AmiGO / QuickGO
Search
- PMC: articles
- PubMed: articles
- NCBI: proteins

In enzymology, a ribosyldihydronicotinamide dehydrogenase (quinone) (EC 1.10.5.1) is an enzyme that catalyzes the chemical reaction

1-(beta-D-ribofuranosyl)-1,4-dihydronicotinamide + a quinone $\rightleftharpoons$ 1-(beta-D-ribofuranosyl)nicotinamide + a hydroquinone

Thus, the two substrates of this enzyme are 1-(beta-D-ribofuranosyl)-1,4-dihydronicotinamide and quinone, whereas its two products are 1-(beta-D-ribofuranosyl)nicotinamide and hydroquinone.

This enzyme belongs to the family of oxidoreductases, specifically those acting on diphenols and related substances as donor with other acceptors. The systematic name of this enzyme class is 1-(beta-D-ribofuranosyl)-1,4-dihydronicotinamide:quinone oxidoreductase. Other names in common use include NRH:quinone oxidoreductase 2, NQO2, NQO2, NAD(P)H:quinone oxidoreductase-2 (misleading), QR2, quinone reductase 2, N-ribosyldihydronicotinamide dehydrogenase (quinone), and NAD(P)H:quinone oxidoreductase2 (misleading).
