= C9H10N2O =

The molecular formula C_{9}H_{10}N_{2}O (molar mass: 162.19 g/mol, exact mass: 162.0793 u) may refer to:

- Phenidone, or 1-phenyl-3-pyrazolidinone
- Aminorex (McN-742)
