= Stop bath =

Acidic solution for processing black-and-white photos

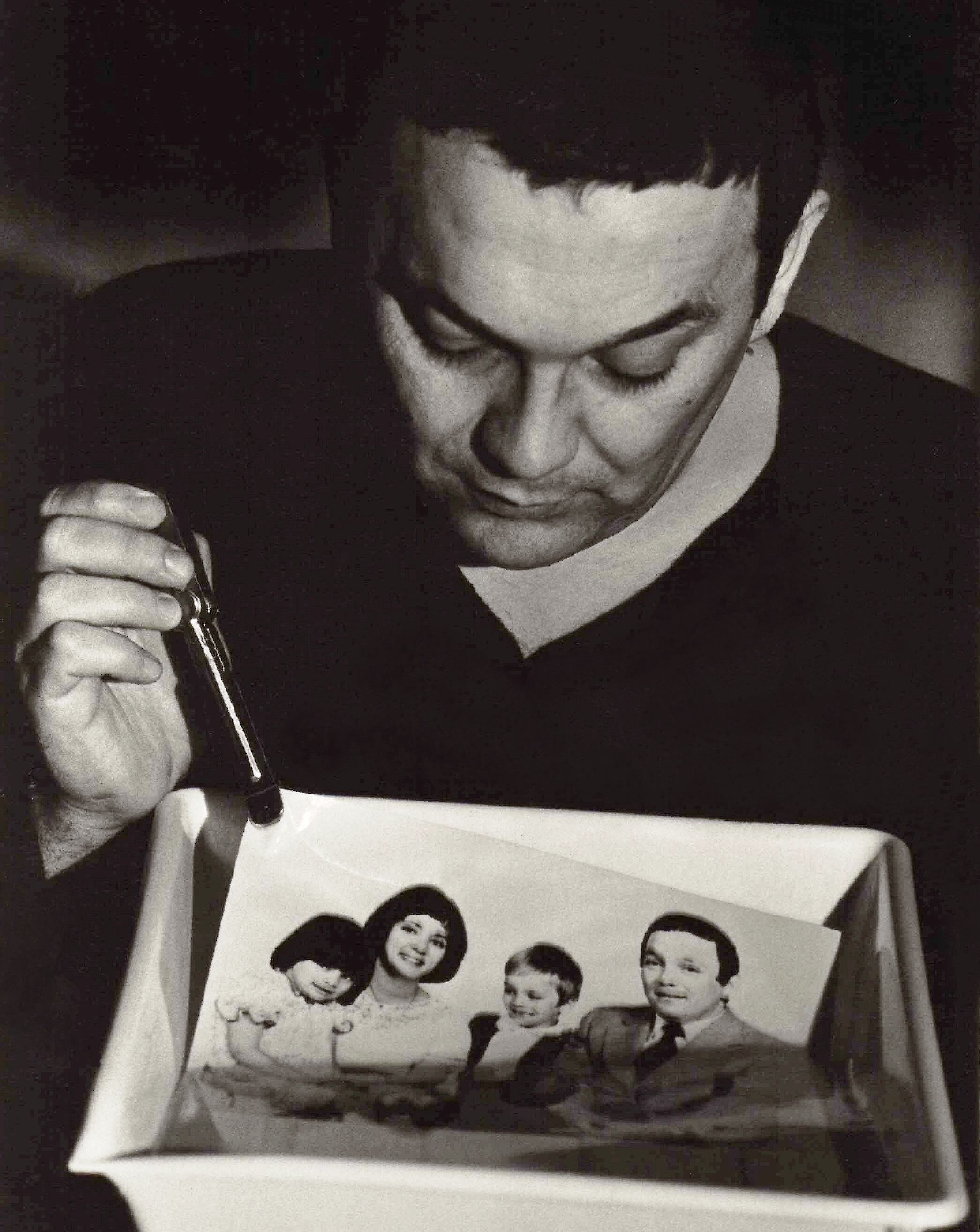
A black and white photographic print in a tray while being processed after exposure to light under a photographic enlarger. Typically three trays are used containing either developer, stop bath, or fixer, in that order. The print must then be rinsed in water to remove the fixer.

A stop bath is an acidic solution used for processing black-and-white photographic film, plates, and paper. It is used to neutralize the alkaline developer, thus halting development.

A stop bath is commonly a 2% dilution of acetic acid in water, though a 2.5% solution of potassium or sodium metabisulfite works just as well. Because organic developers only work in alkaline solutions, stop baths halt the development process almost immediately and provide precise control of development time. Neutralizing the alkalinity of basic developers also helps to preserve the strength of the fixer, making it last longer.

Stop baths account for the vinegar-like odor of the darkroom. In its concentrated form it can cause chemical burns, but is harmless when diluted to a working solution. The stop bath gets exhausted when developer solution carried over on the film or paper is transferred into the bath, raising its pH and making the solution alkaline, meaning it loses its acidity and no longer stops the development process.

For indicator stop baths, which change color to indicate when the bath is exhausted and no longer effective, a pH indicator dye like bromocresol purple is used. Low-odor stop baths use citric acid or sodium bisulfite in place of acetic acid.

Ilford's Ilfostop, for example, is a low-odor citric acid stop bath supplied as a concentrate and diluted 1+19 with water. At 20 °C (68 °F) films and papers need a minimum of 10 seconds in it, and one liter of working solution treats about fifteen 36-exposure 35 mm films, 60 resin-coated prints or 30 fiber-based prints of 8 in × 10 in (20 cm × 25 cm) before it is exhausted, when its indicator dye changes from yellow to purple.
