= Biphenyl-2,3-diol 1,2-dioxygenase =

biphenyl-2,3-diol 1,2-dioxygenase
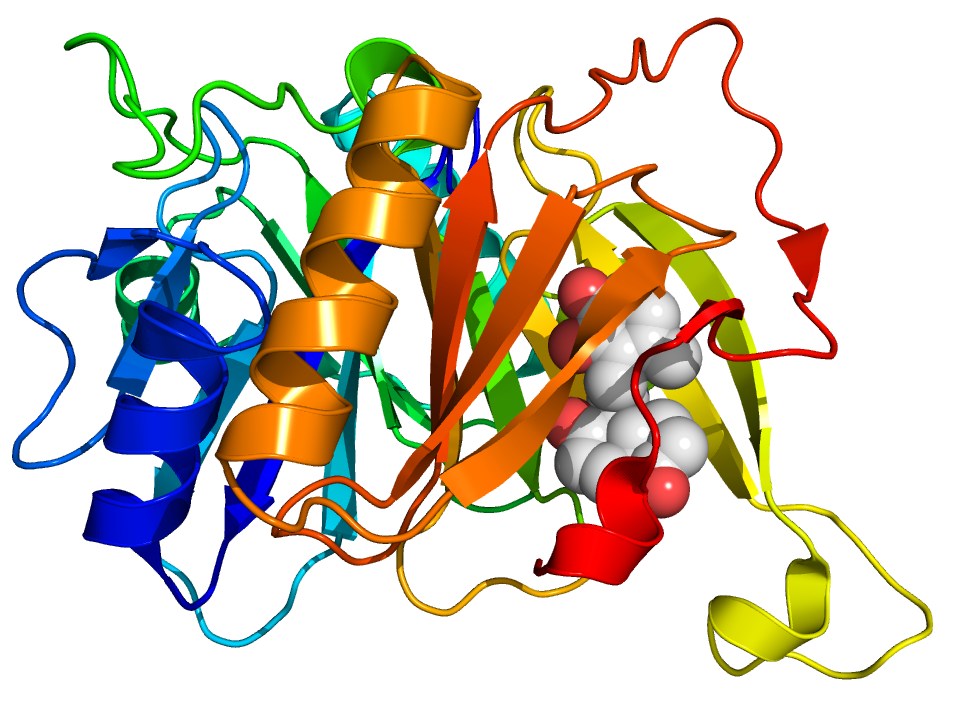
- Crystallographic structure of the HsaC extradiol dioxygenase from M. tuberculosis (rainbow colored, N-terminus = blue, C-terminus = red) complexed with 3,4-DHSA (space-filling model (carbon = white, oxygen = red).

Identifiers
- EC no.: 1.13.11.39
- CAS no.: 103679-58-9

Databases
- IntEnz: IntEnz view
- BRENDA: BRENDA entry
- ExPASy: NiceZyme view
- KEGG: KEGG entry
- MetaCyc: metabolic pathway
- PRIAM: profile
- PDB structures: RCSB PDB PDBe PDBsum
- Gene Ontology: AmiGO / QuickGO
Search
- PMC: articles
- PubMed: articles
- NCBI: proteins

Biphenyl-2,3-diol 1,2-dioxygenase (EC 1.13.11.39) is an enzyme that catalyzes the chemical reaction

biphenyl-2,3-diol + O_{2} $\rightleftharpoons$ 2-hydroxy-6-oxo-6-phenylhexa-2,4-dienoate + H_{2}O

Thus, the two substrates of this enzyme are biphenyl-2,3-diol and oxygen, whereas its two products are 2-hydroxy-6-oxo-6-phenylhexa-2,4-dienoate and water.

This enzyme belongs to the family of oxidoreductases, specifically those acting on single donors with O_{2} as oxidant and incorporation of two atoms of oxygen into the substrate (oxygenases). The oxygen incorporated need not be derived from O_{2}. The systematic name of this enzyme class is biphenyl-2,3-diol:oxygen 1,2-oxidoreductase (decyclizing). Other names in common use include 2,3-dihydroxybiphenyl dioxygenase, and biphenyl-2,3-diol dioxygenase. This enzyme participates in gamma-hexachlorocyclohexane degradation and biphenyl degradation.

== Structural studies ==
As of late 2007, 16 structures have been solved for this class of enzymes, with PDB accession codes 1DHY, 1EIL, 1EIQ, 1EIR, 1HAN, 1KMY, 1KND, 1KNF, 1KW3, 1KW6, 1KW8, 1KW9, 1KWB, 1KWC, 1LGT, and 1LKD.
