= Amidol =

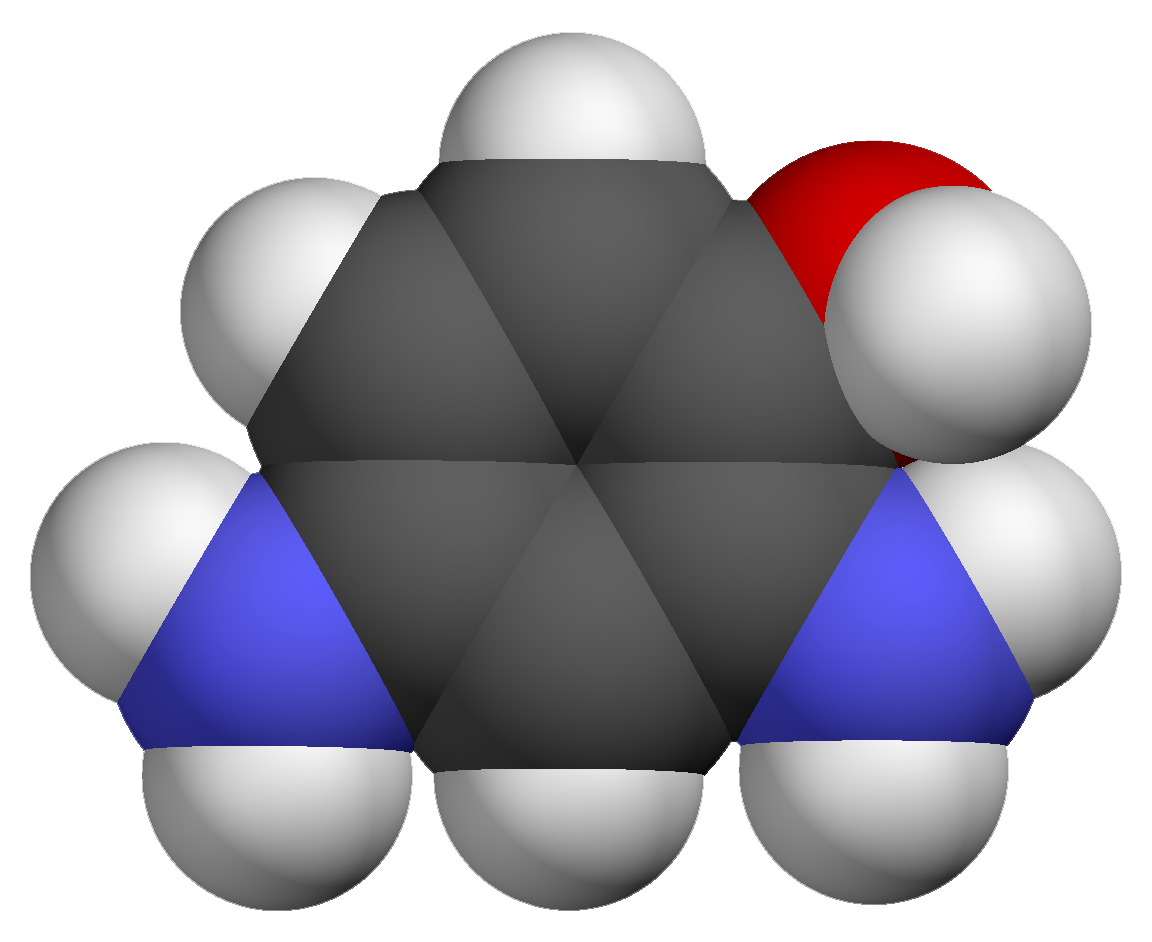

Names
- Preferred IUPAC name 2,4-Diaminophenol

Identifiers
CAS Number	95-86-3; 137-09-7 (dihydrochloride)
3D model (JSmol)	Interactive image; Interactive image
ChEMBL	ChEMBL2924225
ChemSpider	6996
ECHA InfoCard	100.002.237
EC Number	202-459-4
PubChem CID	7266
UNII	NNB4I01PA7
CompTox Dashboard (EPA)	DTXSID7043748
- InChI: InChI=1S/C6H8N2O/c7-4-1-2-6(9)5(8)3-4/h1-3,9H,7-8H2 Key: XIWMTQIUUWJNRP-UHFFFAOYSA-N; InChI=1/C6H8N2O/c7-4-1-2-6(9)5(8)3-4/h1-3,9H,7-8H2 Key: XIWMTQIUUWJNRP-UHFFFAOYAD
- SMILES: NC1=CC(N)=C(O)C=C1; Oc1ccc(N)cc1N

Properties
Chemical formula	C_{6}H_{8}N_{2}O
Molar mass	124.14 g/mol
Appearance	Colorless solid
Melting point	78 to 80 °C (172 to 176 °F; 351 to 353 K)
- Except where otherwise noted, data are given for materials in their standard state (at 25 °C [77 °F], 100 kPa). verify (what is ?) Infobox references

Amidol is a colorless crystalline compound with the molecular structure C_{6}H_{3}(NH_{2})_{2}OH. It is a dihydrogen chloride salt and is used as a photographic developer. It was introduced as a developing agent for photographic papers in 1892. It is unusual amongst developing agents as it works most effectively in slightly acid conditions rather than the strongly alkaline conditions required for most other developers. As amidol ages it changes color to a dark red-brown. Developing dishes and equipment used to prepare amidol solutions are also frequently stained brown, a stain that is very persistent.

Prints developed in amidol are typically a very warm brown-black color, but overdevelopment can quickly lead to chemical fogging.

Amidol's color change upon oxidation is used to advantage as a convenient colorimetric method for measuring the dissolved oxygen concentration in water supplies, rivers, etc.
