= Color Developing Agent 1 =

Names
- Preferred IUPAC name N^{1},N^{1}-Diethylbenzene-1,4-diamine
- Other names N,N-diethyl-p-phenylenediamine; DPD

Identifiers
CAS Number	93-05-0
3D model (JSmol)	Interactive image
ChEMBL	ChEMBL1452158
ChemSpider	13839884
ECHA InfoCard	100.002.014
EC Number	202-214-1
PubChem CID	7120
UNII	0QQA4DFV2J
UN number	1673
CompTox Dashboard (EPA)	DTXSID2025058
- InChI: InChI=1S/C10H16N2/c1-3-12(4-2)10-7-5-9(11)6-8-10/h5-8H,3-4,11H2,1-2H3 Key: QNGVNLMMEQUVQK-UHFFFAOYSA-N
- SMILES: CCN(CC)C1=CC=C(C=C1)N

Properties
Chemical formula	C_{10}H_{16}N_{2}
Molar mass	164.252 g·mol^{−1}

Hazards
- GHS labelling
Pictograms	(GHS05: Corrosive) (GHS06: Toxic)
Signal word	Danger
Hazard statements	H301, H314
Precautionary statements	P260, P264, P270, P280, P301+P310, P301+P330+P331, P303+P361+P353, P304+P340, P305+P351+P338, P310, P321, P330, P363, P405, P501

Related compounds
Related compounds	Color Developing Agent 2; Color Developing Agent 3; Color Developing Agent 4;
- Except where otherwise noted, data are given for materials in their standard state (at 25 °C [77 °F], 100 kPa). Infobox references

Color Developing Agent 1 (CD-1) is the first in the series of color developing agents used in developing color films. It is the organic compound N,N-diethyl-1,4-benzenediamine (DPD), which is usually in the form of the monohydrochloride salt. In color development, after reducing a silver atom in a silver halide crystal, the oxidized developing agent combines with a color coupler to form a color dye molecule.

Arthur Thomas Palin, a Fellow of the Royal Society of Chemistry, developed a widely used color based method of water testing using DPD to indicate the chlorine content of treated water.

== See also ==
- Color Developing Agent 2
- Color Developing Agent 3
- Color Developing Agent 4
