= Arthur Thomas Palin =

British chemist and bacteriologist

- Born: October 16, 1916
- Died: 2006
- Occupations: Chemist and Bacteriologist
- Known for: The Palin System of Water testing

Arthur Thomas Palin (16 October 1916 – 2006) was a British chemist and bacteriologist. As well as inventing the DPD method of detecting chlorine in water and working as an official advisor to the American Water Works Association (AWWA), Palin was responsible for what the Manual of British Water Engineering Practice records as one of the key historical developments, when breakpoint chlorination was first used in England in the city of Coventry in 1943.

== Education ==
Palin's contributions to technical literature have appeared in Canada, Japan, Spain, France, Germany, the U.S. and the U.K. He held a first class degree from the University of London, was awarded a Ph.D. for his chlorination research and was a Fellow of the Royal Society of Chemistry. He was an official advisor to the Standard Methods Committee of the AWWA, and an active member of several of its joint task groups and the Research and Water Quality Disinfection committees.

== Career ==
=== Early career ===
Palin's early experience in water quality testing and control was gained in the service of what was then the London Midland & Scottish Railway Co. His work involved the supervision of the water supplies to a number of large railway towns in the U. K., and included checking the purity of the water supply to the Royal Train.

In 1940, he was appointed first waterworks chemist to the city of Coventry, to supervise the wartime operation of the emergency water supply. The treatment problems in converting contaminated raw water sources into drinkable water stimulated his interest in the application of new and safer methods of water treatment. The challenge to achieve the highest possible quality standards led to the first application in the U.K. of such novel treatments as breakpoint chlorination, already in limited use at that time in the U.S. Although the water supply system in Coventry was extensively damaged by enemy bombing on many occasions, at no time did the public suffer harm from contaminated water. The purity and wholesomeness of the supply was maintained at all times.

Breakpoint chlorination is now widely practiced throughout the world. While the practical benefits afforded by breakpoint chlorination in providing better and faster disinfection of water and other quality improvements were, in those early days, already becoming well established, little was known about the chemical reactions involved in the breakpoint phenomenon. On a practical level, there was also a need for more reliable control tests.

It was this need for a greater understanding of the process that triggered Palin's classic work on chlorination chemistry and his development of new test procedures, including the first practical method for the separate determination of free chlorine, monochloramine, dichloramine and nitrogen trichloride, all of which may, under certain conditions, be found in chlorinated water. It was the development of this analytical method, using the indicator diethyl para phenylene diamine (DPD), that provided the key to open the door to the explanation of the breakpoint in chlorination and laid the foundation for the present classification of modern processes.

With this new knowledge and means of control, chlorination could be applied to water supplies and to swimming pools to give maximum efficiency in disinfection with minimum production of unwanted side effects such as objectionable tastes and odors in drinking water and compounds in swimming pool water that cause eye irritation. The DPD method is now the international standard method for the measurement of free chlorine and combined chlorine residuals. In addition, it is applicable to the determination of other residuals such as chlorine dioxide, bromine, iodine and ozone.

=== The Palintest System of Water Testing ===
In 1945, Palin became the first chief chemist and bacteriologist to the Newcastle and Gateshead Water Co. and established a scientific department with laboratories for research and development. It became evident to Palin that, outside the laboratory, there was a need for a simple, reliable system of routine water testing suitable for use by works operators, upon whom the safety of the public water supply depends.

He developed a system based upon the use of standardized test tablets, applicable to the treatment control of potable water, swimming pools, sewages and effluents, boiler waters and industrial waters of all types. Wilkinson & Simpson, now Palintest Ltd (part of Halma plc), contributed to the development of the tablet tests, and in 1960 were granted an exclusive licence to manufacture and market the Palintest System of water testing.

Palin retired from his position with Newcastle and Gateshead Water Co. in 1977 and joined the Palintest Board. That year saw the inauguration by the company of a new River Tyne Abstraction Scheme. Included in the scheme were new central laboratories, which were named the Palin Laboratories in acknowledgement of Palin's contributions. Further recognitions of Palin's work include a gold medal at the Public Works Congress of 1950, and in the Honours list of 1975 he was given an OBE. At the AWWA conference of 1979, he was made an Honorary Member. He was awarded the Houston Medal of the Institution of Water Engineers for work of outstanding merit for his work on fluoridation control methods.
