= Color Developing Agent 2 =

N,N-Diethyl-o-toluidine
- CD-2 hydrochloride

Names
- IUPAC name 4-N,4-N-diethyl-2-methylbenzene-1,4-diamine

Identifiers
CAS Number	base: 148-71-0; hydrochloride: 2051-79-8
3D model (JSmol)	base: Interactive image; hydrochloride: Interactive image
ChEMBL	base: ChEMBL2094307
ChemSpider	base: 60694; hydrochloride: 67481
ECHA InfoCard	100.016.483
EC Number	base: 205-722-1; hydrochloride: 218-130-3
PubChem CID	base: 67364; hydrochloride: 74920
UNII	base: A640ZQ81DV; hydrochloride: 39MIH70E0I
CompTox Dashboard (EPA)	base: DTXSID7043879
- InChI: base: InChI=1S/C11H18N2/c1-4-13(5-2)10-6-7-11(12)9(3)8-10/h6-8H,4-5,12H2,1-3H3 Key: XBTWVJKPQPQTDW-UHFFFAOYSA-N; hydrochloride: InChI=1S/C11H18N2.ClH/c1-4-13(5-2)10-6-7-11(12)9(3)8-10;/h6-8H,4-5,12H2,1-3H3;1H Key: MPLZNPZPPXERDA-UHFFFAOYSA-N
- SMILES: base: CCN(CC)C1=CC(=C(C=C1)N)C; hydrochloride: CC[NH+](CC)C1=CC(=C(C=C1)N)C.[Cl-]

Properties
Chemical formula	C_{11}H_{18}N_{2}
Molar mass	178.279 g·mol^{−1}

Hazards
- GHS labelling
Pictograms	(GHS06: Toxic) (GHS07: Exclamation mark)
Signal word	Danger
Hazard statements	H301, H311, H312, H315, H317, H319, H331, H413
Precautionary statements	P261, P264, P270, P271, P272, P273, P280, P301+P310, P302+P352, P304+P340, P311, P312, P321, P322, P330, P333+P313, P361, P363, P403+P233, P405, P501

Related compounds
Related compounds	Color Developing Agent 1; Color Developing Agent 3; Color Developing Agent 4
- Except where otherwise noted, data are given for materials in their standard state (at 25 °C [77 °F], 100 kPa). Infobox references

Color Developing Agent 2 is the second in the series of color developing agents used in developing color films. It is commonly known as CD-2 and is chemically known as 4-diethylamino-o-toluidine, 1,4-benzenediamine, N4,N4-diethyl-2-methyl-, N1,N1-diethyl-3-methylbenzene-1,4-diamine, or 4-(diethylamino)-2-methylaniline. In color development, after reducing a silver atom in a silver halide crystal, the oxidized developing agent combines with a color coupler to form a color dye molecule.

== See also ==
- Color Developing Agent 1
- Color Developing Agent 3
- Color Developing Agent 4
