= Color Developing Agent 3 =

Names
- IUPAC name N-[2-(4-amino-N-ethyl-3-methylanilino)ethyl]methanesulfonamide;sulfuric acid

Identifiers
CAS Number	25646-71-3
3D model (JSmol)	Interactive image
ChemSpider	82689
ECHA InfoCard	100.042.859
EC Number	247-161-5
PubChem CID	91578
UNII	KSG4Z13NE0
CompTox Dashboard (EPA)	DTXSID2027882
- InChI: InChI=1S/2C12H21N3O2S.3H2O4S/c2*1-4-15(8-7-14-18(3,16)17)11-5-6-12(13)10(2)9-11;3*1-5(2,3)4/h2*5-6,9,14H,4,7-8,13H2,1-3H3;3*(H2,1,2,3,4) Key: NPDFXFLCEDDWEG-UHFFFAOYSA-N
- SMILES: CCN(CCNS(=O)(=O)C)C1=CC(=C(C=C1)N)C.CCN(CCNS(=O)(=O)C)C1=CC(=C(C=C1)N)C.OS(=O)(=O)O.OS(=O)(=O)O.OS(=O)(=O)O

Properties
Chemical formula	C_{24}H_{48}N_{6}O_{16}S_{5}
Molar mass	836.97 g·mol^{−1}

Hazards
- GHS labelling
Pictograms	(GHS07: Exclamation mark) (GHS09: Environmental hazard)
Signal word	Warning
Hazard statements	H302, H317, H410
Precautionary statements	P261, P264, P270, P272, P273, P280, P301+P312, P302+P352, P321, P330, P333+P313, P363, P391, P501

Related compounds
Related compounds	Color Developing Agent 1; Color Developing Agent 2; Color Developing Agent 4
- Except where otherwise noted, data are given for materials in their standard state (at 25 °C [77 °F], 100 kPa). Infobox references

The third in the series of color developing agents used in developing color films, commonly known as CD-3, is chemically known as N-[2-[(4-Amino-3-methylphenyl)ethylamino]ethyl]methanesulfonamide Sesquisulfate Monohydrate. In color development, after reducing a silver atom in a silver halide crystal, the oxidized developing agent combines with a color coupler to form a color dye molecule. CD-3 is used in many processes including VNF-1, ECN-2 and the E-6 process.

== See also ==
- Color Developing Agent 1
- Color Developing Agent 2
- Color Developing Agent 4
