= Ferujol =

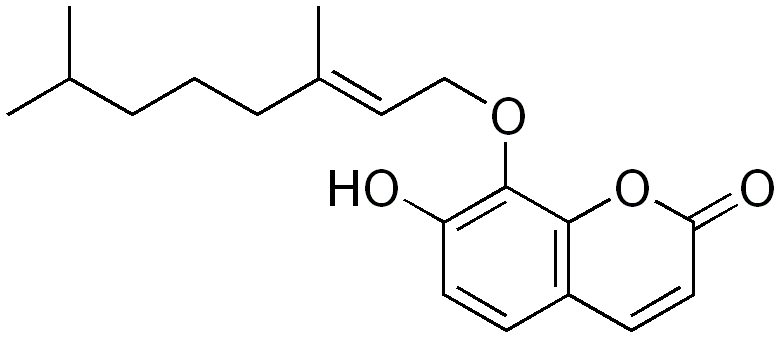

Names
- Preferred IUPAC name 8-{[(2E)-3,7-Dimethyloct-2-en-1-yl]oxy}-7-hydroxy-2H-1-benzopyran-2-one

Identifiers
CAS Number	98299-78-6
3D model (JSmol)	Interactive image
ChemSpider	4940313
PubChem CID	6435569
UNII	SGK3OX19I8
CompTox Dashboard (EPA)	DTXSID70897601
- InChI: InChI=1S/C19H24O4/c1-13(2)5-4-6-14(3)11-12-22-19-16(20)9-7-15-8-10-17(21)23-18(15)19/h7-11,13,20H,4-6,12H2,1-3H3/b14-11+ Key: ATKUFZHTQAERBN-SDNWHVSQSA-N; InChI=1/C19H24O4/c1-13(2)5-4-6-14(3)11-12-22-19-16(20)9-7-15-8-10-17(21)23-18(15)19/h7-11,13,20H,4-6,12H2,1-3H3/b14-11+ Key: ATKUFZHTQAERBN-SDNWHVSQBS
- SMILES: O=C/2Oc1c(OC\C=C(/C)CCCC(C)C)c(O)ccc1\C=C\2

Properties
Chemical formula	C_{19}H_{24}O_{4}
Molar mass	316.397 g·mol^{−1}
- Except where otherwise noted, data are given for materials in their standard state (at 25 °C [77 °F], 100 kPa). verify (what is ?) Infobox references

Ferujol is a compound in the coumarin family, isolated from Ferula jaeschkeana.

It is reported to have contraceptive activity when given to female rats 1–5 days after coitus.
