= Metol =

Reducing aromatic compound used as developing agent in black and white photography

Names
- IUPAC name 4-(methylamino)phenol sulfate
- Other names: N-methyl-p-aminophenol sulfate; Pictol; p-(methylamino)phenol sulfate; Monomethyl-p-aminophenol hemisulfate; Metol; Elon; Rhodol; Enel; Viterol; Scalol; Genol; Satrapol; Photol

Identifiers
CAS Number	55-55-0
3D model (JSmol)	Interactive image
ChEBI	CHEBI:55413
ChemSpider	5717
ECHA InfoCard	100.000.216
KEGG	C11206
PubChem CID	5930
UNII	D3W0VWG12M
CompTox Dashboard (EPA)	DTXSID6025565
- InChI: InChI=1S/2C7H9NO.H2O4S/c2*1-8-6-2-4-7(9)5-3-6;1-5(2,3)4/h2*2-5,8-9H,1H3;(H2,1,2,3,4) Key: ZVNPWFOVUDMGRP-UHFFFAOYSA-N; InChI=1/2C7H9NO.H2O4S/c2*1-8-6-2-4-7(9)5-3-6;1-5(2,3)4/h2*2-5,8-9H,1H3;(H2,1,2,3,4) Key: ZVNPWFOVUDMGRP-UHFFFAOYAW
- SMILES: O=S(=O)(O)O.Oc1ccc(NC)cc1.Oc1ccc(NC)cc1

Properties
Chemical formula	(C_{7}H_{10}NO)_{2}SO_{4}
Molar mass	344.38 g/mol
Melting point	260 °C (500 °F; 533 K)

Hazards
- GHS labelling
Pictograms	(GHS08: Health hazard) (GHS07: Exclamation mark) (GHS09: Environmental hazard)
Signal word	Warning
Hazard statements	H302, H317, H373, H410
Precautionary statements	P260, P280, P301+P312+P330
Safety data sheet (SDS)	Oxford MSDS
- Except where otherwise noted, data are given for materials in their standard state (at 25 °C [77 °F], 100 kPa). verify (what is ?) Infobox references

Metol is a trade name for the organic compound with the formula [HOC_{6}H_{4}NH_{2}(CH_{3})]_{2}HSO_{4}. It is the sulfate salt of N-methylaminophenol. This colourless salt is a popular photographic developer used in monochrome photography.

== Synthesis and degradation ==
Several methods exist for the preparation of N-methylaminophenol. It arises by decarboxylation of N-4-hydroxyphenylglycine (Glycin). It can be obtained by reaction of hydroquinone with methylamine.

Being an electron-rich arene, metol is readily degraded by hydrogen peroxide.

== Application ==
Metol is an excellent developing agent for most continuous tone developer applications, and it has been widely used in published developer formulas as well as commercial products. However, it is difficult to produce highly concentrated developer solutions using Metol, and therefore, most Metol developers are supplied in dry chemical mix. A developer containing both Metol and hydroquinone is called an MQ developer. This combination of agents provides greater developer activity since the rate of development by both agents together is greater than the sum of rates of development by each agent used alone (superadditivity). This combination is very versatile; by varying the quantities of Metol, hydroquinone, and restrainer, and adjusting the pH, the entire range of continuous tone developers can be made. A popular variation of this is known as 'Dr. Beers.' Two separate solutions are made up: one with Metol; one with hydroquinone. By mixing the two in varying proportions, various levels of contrast can be obtained. Therefore, this form of Metol replaced most other developing agents except for hydroquinone, Phenidone (which is more recent than Metol), and derivatives of Phenidone. Notable formulas include Eastman Kodak D-76 film developer, D-72 print developer, and D-96 motion picture negative developer.

== History ==
Alfred Bogisch, working for a chemical company owned by Julius Hauff, discovered in 1891 that methylated p-aminophenol has more vigorous developing action than p-aminophenol. Hauff introduced this compound as a developing agent. The exact composition of Bogisch and Hauff's early Metol is unknown, but it was most likely methylated at the ortho position of the benzene ring (p-amino-o-methylphenol), rather than at the amino group. Some time later, Metol came to mean the N-methylated variety, and the o-methylated variety fell out of use. Aktien-Gesellschaft für Anilinfabrikation (AGFA) sold this compound under the trade name Metol, which became by far the most common name.

Because it has been in use for this purpose for over 100 years, and often by amateur photographers, there is a substantial body of evidence regarding the health problems that contact with Metol can cause. These are principally local dermatitis of the hands and forearms. There is also some evidence of sensitization dermatitis.
