= DHSA =

Names
- IUPAC name 3,4-Dihydroxy-9,10-secoandrosta-1,3,5(10)-triene-9,17-dione
- Systematic IUPAC name (3aS,4S,7aS)-4-[2-(2,3-Dihydroxy-6-methylphenyl)ethyl]-7a-methylhexahydro-1H-indene-1,5(4H)-dione

Identifiers
CAS Number	2168-61-8
3D model (JSmol)	Interactive image
ChEBI	CHEBI:15896
ChemSpider	389410
DrugBank	DB08542
KEGG	C04793
PubChem CID	440483
CompTox Dashboard (EPA)	DTXSID701028828
- InChI: InChI=1S/C19H24O4/c1-11-3-7-16(21)18(23)12(11)4-5-13-14-6-8-17(22)19(14,2)10-9-15(13)20/h3,7,13-14,21,23H,4-6,8-10H2,1-2H3/t13-,14-,19-/m0/s1 Key: YUHVBHDSVLKFNI-NJSLBKSFSA-N
- SMILES: CC1=C(C(=C(C=C1)O)O)CCC2C3CCC(=O)C3(CCC2=O)C

Properties
Chemical formula	C_{19}H_{24}O_{4}
Molar mass	316.39146
- Except where otherwise noted, data are given for materials in their standard state (at 25 °C [77 °F], 100 kPa). verify (what is ?) Infobox references

3,4-DHSA is an organic compound which is the intermediate product of the metabolism of cholesterol, by the bacteria most commonly responsible for tuberculosis (Mycobacterium tuberculosis). 3,4-DHSA is an acronym for 3,4-dihydroxy-9,10-seco-androst-1,3,5(10)-triene-9,17-dione, the official name of this substance. It is classified as a secosteroid, since one of the four rings of cholesterol from which it is derived is broken.

3,4-DHSA is a catecholic intermediate (a compound containing an aromatic ring with two adjacent hydroxyl groups) produced by M. tuberculosis during the breakdown of cholesterol. 3,4-DHSA is also produced by other bacteria such as Comamonas testosteroni.

A particular type of enzyme known as extradiol dioxygenase is responsible for the oxidation and ring opening of 3,4-DHSA to 4,9-DSHA (see metabolic scheme below). M. tuberculosis bacteria that are deficient in this enzyme are less lethal than wild-type bacteria. 3,4-DHSA itself appears to be toxic to the bacteria while the breakdown products of 3,4-DHSA can be used as energy source by the bacteria. Hence blocking the oxidation of 3,4-DHSA by the extradiol dioxygenase enzyme may be useful in the treatment of tuberculosis.

A crystal structure of DHSA in complex with M. tuberculosis iron-dependent extradiol dioxygenase has been determined.

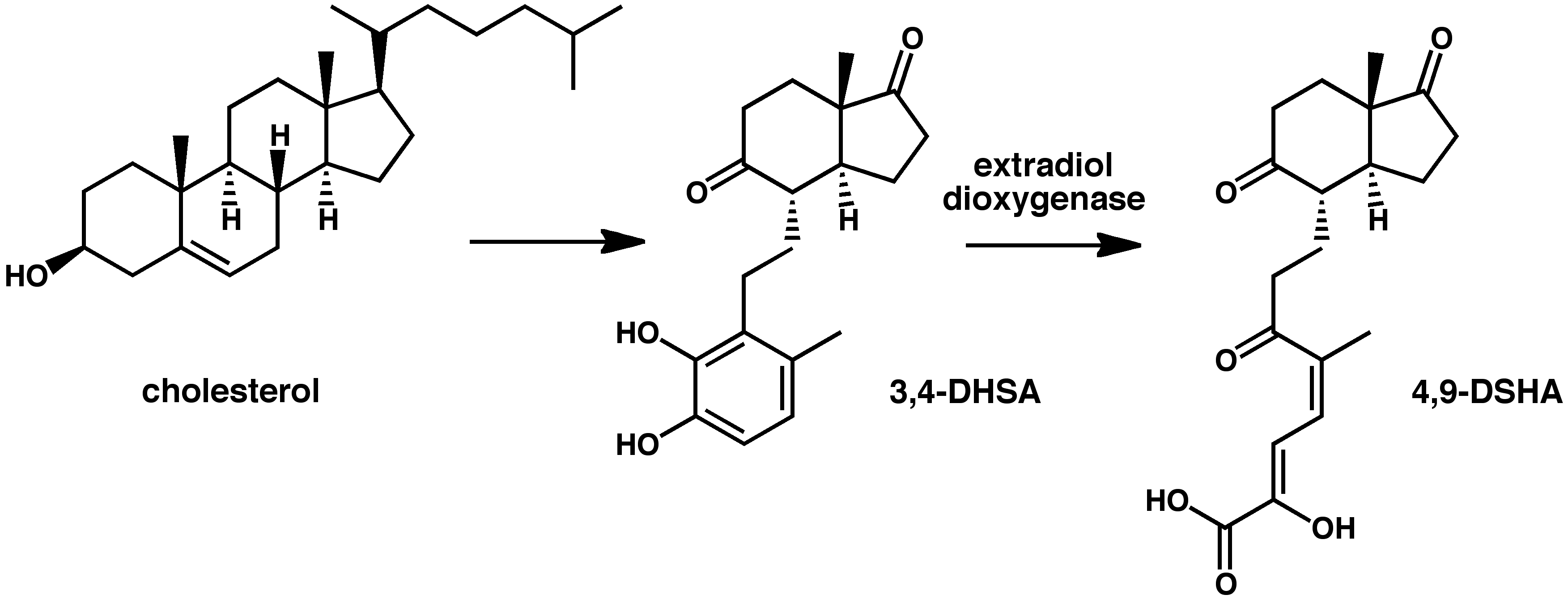
Synthesis and degradation of 3,4-DHSA.
