= Iron(II) citrate =

- Skeletal formula of iron(II) citrate

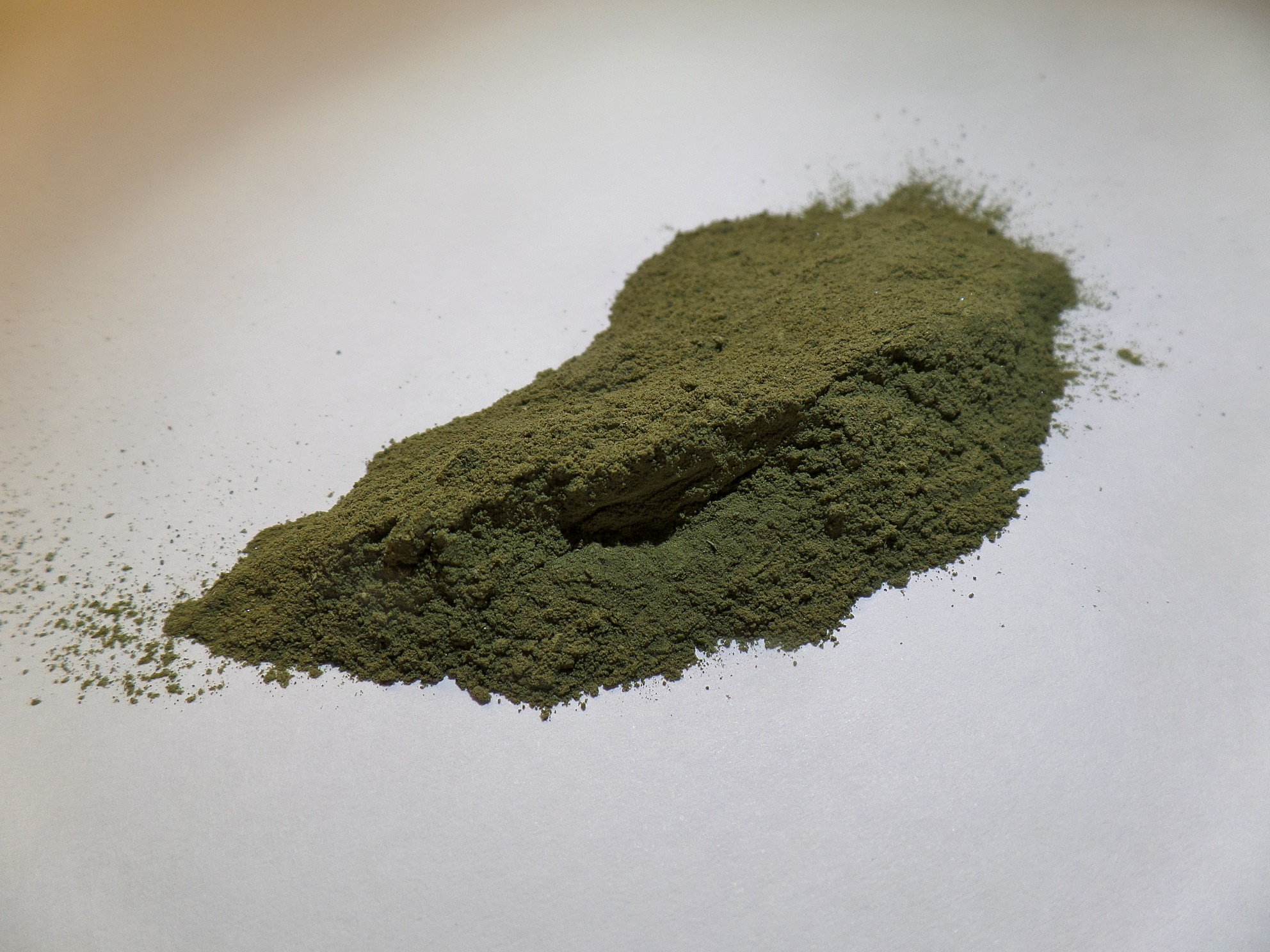
- Powdered Iron(II) citrate hydrate

Names
- IUPAC name Iron(II) hydrogen 2-hydroxy-1,2,3-tricarboxylpropane
- Other names: Ferrous citrate; Iron citrate

Identifiers
CAS Number	hydrogen citrate: 22242-53-1
3D model (JSmol)	hydrogen citrate: Interactive image
ChemSpider	hydrogen citrate: 9239835
ECHA InfoCard	100.041.463
EC Number	hydrogen citrate: 245-625-1
PubChem CID	hydrogen citrate: 11064683
UNII	hydrogen citrate: 33KM3X4QQW
- InChI: InChI=1S/C6H8O7.Fe/c7-3(8)1-6(13,5(11)12)2-4(9)10;/h13H,1-2H2,(H,7,8)(H,9,10)(H,11,12);/q;+2/p-2 Key: APVZWAOKZPNDNR-UHFFFAOYSA-L
- SMILES: hydrogen citrate: C(C(=O)O)C(CC(=O)[O-])(C(=O)[O-])O.[Fe+2]

Properties
Chemical formula	FeC_{6}H_{6}O_{7}
Molar mass	245.95644 g/mol
Appearance	slightly gray-green powder or white crystals unstable
Density	1.91 g/cm^{3}
Melting point	decomposes
- Except where otherwise noted, data are given for materials in their standard state (at 25 °C [77 °F], 100 kPa). Infobox references

Ferrous citrate, also known as iron(II) citrate or iron(2+) citrate, describes coordination complexes containing citrate anions with Fe^{2+} formed in aqueous solution. Although a number of complexes are possible (or even likely), only one complex has been crystallized. That complex is the coordination polymer with the formula [Fe(H_{2}O)_{6}]^{2+}{[Fe(C_{6}H_{5}O_{7})(H_{2}O)]^{−}}_{2}^{.}2H_{2}O, where C_{6}H_{5}O_{7}^{3-} is HOC(CH_{2}CO_{2}^{−})_{2}(CO_{2}^{−}, i.e., the triple conjugate base of citric acid wherein the three carboxylic acid groups are ionized. Ferrous citrates are all paramagnetic, reflecting the weak crystal field of the carboxylate ligands.

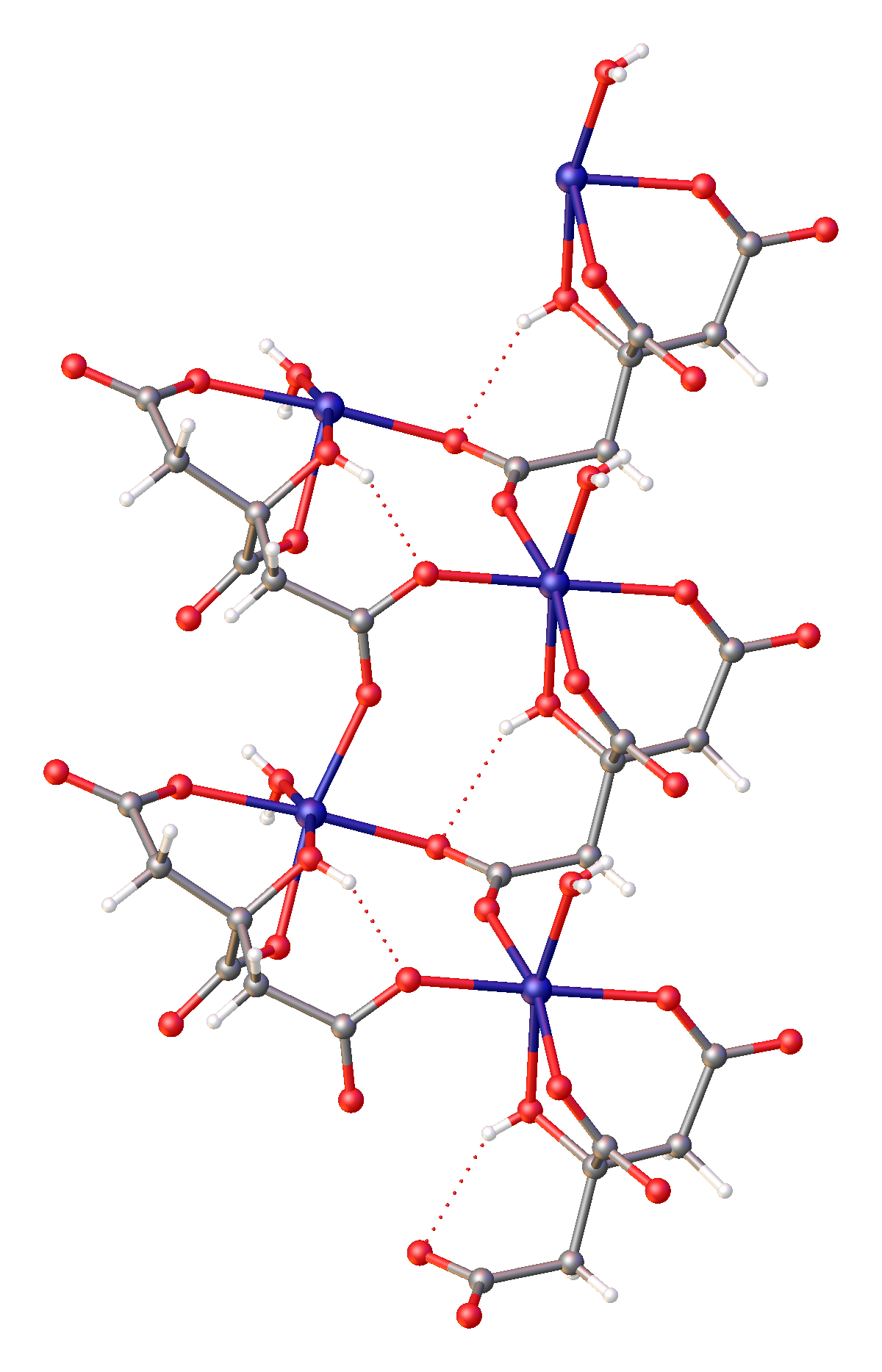
Structure of the anionic coordination polymer {[Fe(C_{6}H_{5}O_{7})(H_{2}O)]^{−}}_{n}. (legend: red = O, gray = C, blue = Fe, white = H).

Ferrous citrates are produced by treating disodium citrate Na_{2}C_{6}H_{6}O_{7} with sources of iron(II) aquo complexes, such as iron(II) sulfate. Ferrous citrates are all highly unstable in air, converting to ferric citrates.

It is a nutrient supplement approved by the FDA.

== See also ==
- Iron(III) citrate
- Ammonium ferric citrate
