= Color Developing Agent 4 =

Names
- IUPAC name 2-(4-amino-N-ethyl-3-methylanilino)ethanol;sulfuric acid

Identifiers
CAS Number	25646-77-9
3D model (JSmol)	Interactive image
ChemSpider	82690
ECHA InfoCard	100.042.860
EC Number	247-162-0
PubChem CID	91579
UNII	BS668SJ6PT
CompTox Dashboard (EPA)	DTXSID80897435
- InChI: InChI=1S/C11H18N2O.H2O4S/c1-3-13(6-7-14)10-4-5-11(12)9(2)8-10;1-5(2,3)4/h4-5,8,14H,3,6-7,12H2,1-2H3;(H2,1,2,3,4) Key: GVEYRUKUJCHJSR-UHFFFAOYSA-N
- SMILES: CCN(CCO)C1=CC(=C(C=C1)N)C.OS(=O)(=O)O

Properties
Chemical formula	C_{11}H_{20}N_{2}O_{5}S
Molar mass	292.35 g·mol^{−1}

Hazards
- GHS labelling
Pictograms	(GHS06: Toxic) (GHS07: Exclamation mark) (GHS08: Health hazard) (GHS09: Environmental hazard)
Signal word	Danger
Hazard statements	H301, H317, H373, H410
Precautionary statements	P260, P264, P270, P272, P273, P280, P301+P310, P302+P352, P314, P321, P330, P333+P313, P363, P391, P405, P501

Related compounds
Related compounds	Color Developing Agent 1; Color Developing Agent 2; Color Developing Agent 3
- Except where otherwise noted, data are given for materials in their standard state (at 25 °C [77 °F], 100 kPa). Infobox references

The fourth in the series of color developing agents used in developing color films, commonly known as CD-4, is chemically known as 4-(N-Ethyl-N-2-hydroxyethyl)-2-methylphenylenediamine sulfate. In color development, after reducing a silver atom in a silver halide crystal, the oxidized developing agent combines with a color coupler to form a color dye molecule.

== See also ==
- Color Developing Agent 1
- Color Developing Agent 2
- Color Developing Agent 3
