= Catechol =

Chemical compound

Pyrocatechol
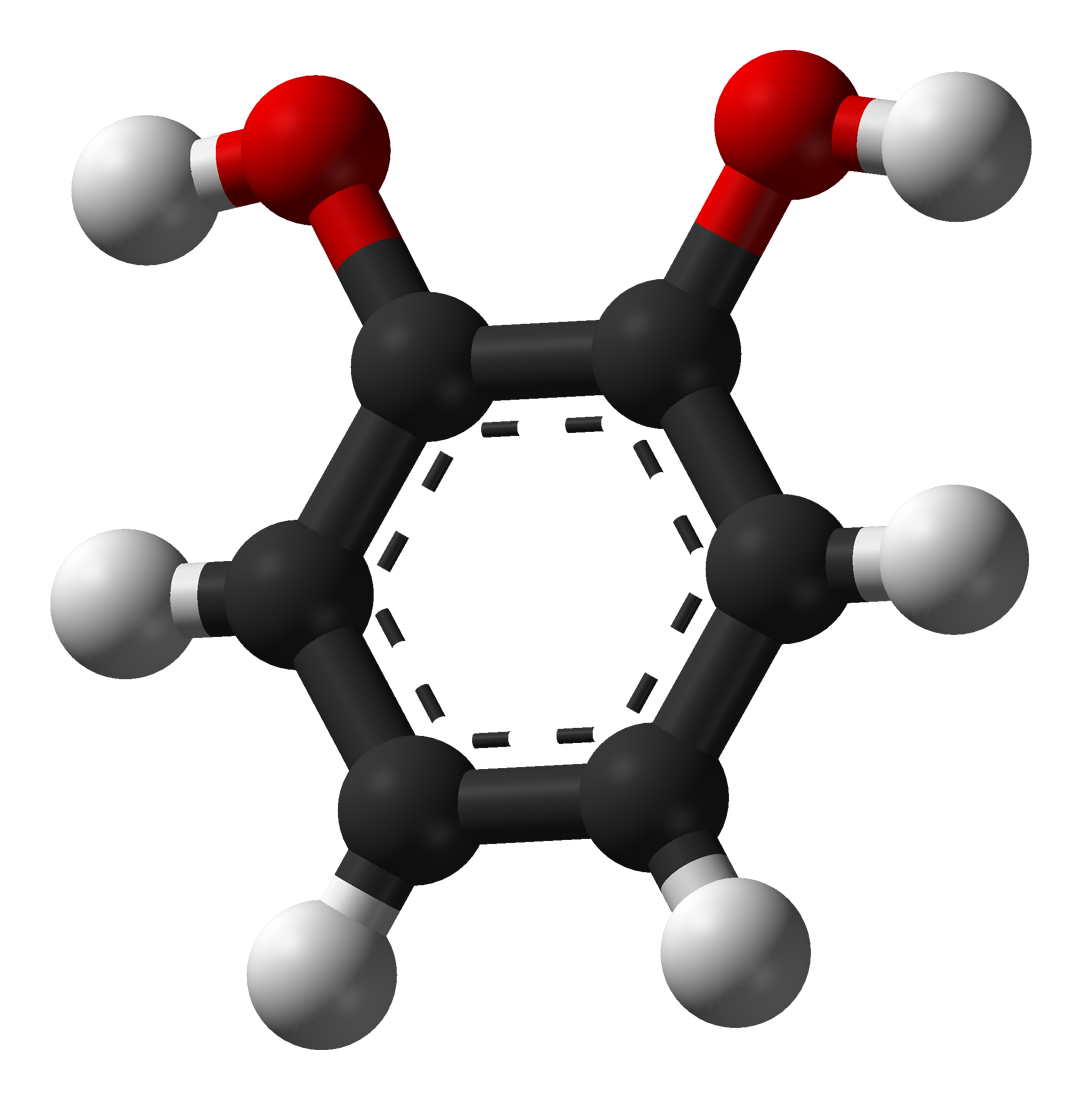
Ball-and-stick model

Names
- Preferred IUPAC name Benzene-1,2-diol
- Other names Pyrocatechol; 1,2-Benzenediol; 2-Hydroxyphenol; 1,2-Dihydroxybenzene o-Benzenediol o-Dihydroxybenzene

Identifiers
CAS Number	120-80-9
3D model (JSmol)	Interactive image
Beilstein Reference	471401
ChEBI	CHEBI:18135
ChEMBL	ChEMBL280998
ChemSpider	13837760
DrugBank	DB02232
ECHA InfoCard	100.004.025
EC Number	204-427-5
Gmelin Reference	2936
KEGG	C00090
PubChem CID	289
RTECS number	UX1050000
UNII	LF3AJ089DQ
CompTox Dashboard (EPA)	DTXSID3020257
- InChI: InChI=1S/C6H6O2/c7-5-3-1-2-4-6(5)8/h1-4,7-8H Key: YCIMNLLNPGFGHC-UHFFFAOYSA-N
- SMILES: Oc1c(O)cccc1

Properties
Chemical formula	C_{6}H_{6}O_{2}
Molar mass	110.112 g·mol^{−1}
Appearance	white to brown feathery crystals
Odor	faint, phenolic odor
Density	1.344 g/cm^{3}, solid
Melting point	105 °C (221 °F; 378 K)
Boiling point	245.5 °C (473.9 °F; 518.6 K) (sublimes)
Solubility in water	312 g/L at 20 °C
Solubility	very soluble in pyridine soluble in chloroform, benzene, CCl_{4}, diethyl ether, ethyl acetate
log P	0.88
Vapor pressure	20 Pa (20 °C)
Acidity (pK_{a})	9.45, 12.8
Magnetic susceptibility (χ)	−6.876×10^{−5} cm^{3}/mol
Refractive index (n_{D})	1.604
Dipole moment	2.62±0.03 D

Structure
Crystal structure	monoclinic

Thermochemistry
Std enthalpy of formation (Δ_{f}H^{⦵}_{298})	−354.1 kJ·mol^{−1}
Enthalpy of fusion (Δ_{f}H^{⦵}_{fus})	22.8 kJ·mol^{−1} (at melting point)

Hazards
- GHS labelling
Pictograms	(GHS06: Toxic) (GHS08: Health hazard) (GHS05: Corrosive)
Signal word	Danger
Hazard statements	H301, H311, H315, H317, H318, H332, H341
Precautionary statements	P261, P301, P302, P305, P310, P312, P330, P331, P338, P351, P352
NFPA 704 (fire diamond)	3 1 0
Flash point	127 °C (261 °F; 400 K)
Autoignition temperature	510 °C (950 °F; 783 K)
Explosive limits	1.4%–?
- Lethal dose or concentration (LD, LC)
LD_{50} (median dose)	300 mg/kg (rat, oral)
- NIOSH (US health exposure limits)
PEL (Permissible)	none
REL (Recommended)	TWA 5 ppm (20 mg/m^{3}) [skin]
IDLH (Immediate danger)	N.D.
Safety data sheet (SDS)	Sigma-Aldrich

Related compounds
Related benzenediols	Resorcinol; Hydroquinone
Related compounds	1,2-benzoquinone
- Except where otherwise noted, data are given for materials in their standard state (at 25 °C [77 °F], 100 kPa). verify (what is ?) Infobox references

Catechol (/ˈkætɪtʃɒl/ or /ˈkætɪkɒl/), also known as pyrocatechol or 1,2-dihydroxybenzene, is an organic compound with the molecular formula C_{6}H_{4}(OH)_{2}. It is the ortho isomer of the three isomeric benzenediols. This colorless compound occurs naturally in trace amounts. It was first discovered by destructive distillation of the plant extract catechin. About 20,000 tonnes of catechol are now synthetically produced annually as a commodity organic chemical, mainly as a precursor to pesticides, flavors, and fragrances. Small amounts of catechol occur in fruits and vegetables.

== Isolation and synthesis ==
Catechol was first isolated in 1839 by Edgar Hugo Emil Reinsch (1809–1884) by distilling it from the solid tannic preparation catechin, which is the residuum of catechu, the boiled or concentrated juice of Mimosa catechu (Acacia catechu). Upon heating catechin above its decomposition point, a substance that Reinsch first named Brenz-Katechusäure (burned catechu acid) sublimated as a white efflorescence. This was a thermal decomposition product of the flavanols in catechin. In 1841, both Wackenroder and Zwenger independently rediscovered catechol; in reporting on their findings, Philosophical Magazine coined the name pyrocatechin. By 1852, Erdmann realized that catechol was benzene with two oxygen atoms added to it; in 1867, August Kekulé realized that catechol was a diol of benzene, so by 1868, catechol was listed as pyrocatechol. In 1879, the Journal of the Chemical Society recommended that catechol be called "catechol", and in the following year, it was listed as such.

Catechol has since been shown to occur in free form naturally in kino and in beechwood tar. Its sulfonic acid has been detected in the urine of horses and humans.

Catechol is produced industrially by the hydroxylation of phenol using hydrogen peroxide.

C_{6}H_{5}OH + H_{2}O_{2} → C_{6}H_{4}(OH)_{2} + H_{2}O

It can be produced by reaction of salicylaldehyde with base and hydrogen peroxide (Dakin oxidation), as well as the hydrolysis of 2-substituted phenols, especially 2-chlorophenol, with hot aqueous solutions containing alkali metal hydroxides. Its methyl ether derivative, guaiacol, converts to catechol via hydrolysis of the CH_{3}−O bond as promoted by hydroiodic acid (HI).

== Reactions ==
Like some other difunctional benzene derivatives, catechol readily condenses to form heterocyclic compounds. For example, using phosphorus trichloride or phosphorus oxychloride gives the cyclic chlorophosphonite or chlorophosphonate, respectively; sulfuryl chloride gives the sulfate; and phosgene (COCl_{2}) gives the carbonate:

C_{6}H_{4}(OH)_{2} + XCl_{2} → C_{6}H_{4}(O_{2}X) + 2 HCl where X = PCl or POCl; SO_{2}; CO

Basic solutions of catechol react with iron(III) to give the red [Fe(C_{6}H_{4}O_{2})_{3}]^{3−}. Ferric chloride gives a green coloration with the aqueous solution, while the alkaline solution rapidly changes to a green and finally to a black color on exposure to the air. Iron-containing dioxygenase enzymes catalyze the cleavage of catechol.

=== Redox chemistry ===
Catechols convert to the semiquinone radical. At pH = 7, this conversion occurs at 100 mV:

C_{6}H_{4}(OH)_{2} → C_{6}H_{4}(O)(OH) + ½ H_{2}

The semiquinone radical can be reduced to the catecholate dianion, the potential being dependent on pH:

C_{6}H_{4}(O)(OH) + e^{−} → [C_{6}H_{4}O_{2}]^{2−} + H^{+}

Catechol is produced by a reversible two-electron, two-proton reduction of 1,2-benzoquinone (E^{0} = +795 mV vs SHE; E_{m} (at pH 7) = +380 mV vs SHE).

The redox series catecholate dianion, monoanionic semiquinonate, and benzoquinone are collectively called dioxolenes. Dioxolenes can function as ligands for metal ions.

== Catechol derivatives ==
Naturally occurring catechols

3,4-dihydroxy-9,10-secoandrosta-1,3,5(10)-triene-9,17-dione, a metabolite of cholesterol

Catechin, a component of tea.

Piceatannol, an antioxidant found in some red wines.

Urushiols, the active agent in poison ivy (R = (CH_{2})_{14}CH_{3}, (CH_{2})_{7}CH=CHCH_{2}CH=CHCH_{2}CH=CH_{2}, and others)

Catecholamines, drugs imitating them (such as MDMA), hormones/neurotransmitters

Dopamine, a well-known neurotransmitter with many important roles in cells

Quercetin, which is found in many foods.

Catechol derivatives are found widely in nature. They often arise by hydroxylation of phenols. Arthropod cuticle consists of chitin linked by a catechol moiety to protein. The cuticle may be strengthened by cross-linking (tanning and sclerotization), in particular, in insects, and of course by biomineralization.

The synthetic derivative 4-tert-butylcatechol is used as an antioxidant and polymerization inhibitor.

== Uses ==
Approximately 50% of the synthetic catechol is consumed in the production of pesticides, the remainder being used as a precursor to fine chemicals such as perfumes and pharmaceuticals. It is a common building block in organic synthesis. Several industrially significant flavors and fragrances are prepared starting from catechol. Guaiacol is prepared by methylation of catechol and is then converted to vanillin on a scale of about 10M kg per year (1990). The related monoethyl ether of catechol, guethol, is converted to ethylvanillin, a component of chocolate confectioneries. 3-trans-Isocamphylcyclohexanol, widely used as a replacement for sandalwood oil, is prepared from catechol via guaiacol and camphor. Piperonal, a flowery scent, is prepared from the methylene diether of catechol followed by condensation with glyoxal and decarboxylation.

Josef Maria Eder published in 1879 his findings on the use of catechol as a black-and-white photographic developer, but, except for some special purpose applications, its use is largely historical. It is rumored to have been used briefly in Eastman Kodak's HC-110 developer and Anchell supposes it to be a component in Tetenal's Neofin Blau developer. It is a key component of Tanol from Moersch Photochemie in Germany. Modern catechol developing was pioneered by noted photographer Sandy King, whose "PyroCat" formulation is popular among modern black-and-white film photographers. King's work has since inspired further 21st-century development by others such as Jay De Fehr with Hypercat and Obsidian Acqua developers, and others.

== Nomenclature ==
Although rarely encountered, the officially "preferred IUPAC name" (PIN) of catechol is benzene-1,2-diol. The trivial name pyrocatechol is a retained IUPAC name, according to the 1993 Recommendations for the Nomenclature of Organic Chemistry.

== See also ==
- Enol
- Pyrogallol
- Thiotimoline
