= Glycin =

- Glycin

Names
- IUPAC name N-(4-Hydroxyphenyl)glycine
- Systematic IUPAC name (4-Hydroxyanilino)acetic acid
- Other names p-hydroxyanilinoacetic acid photoglycine

Identifiers
CAS Number	122-87-2
3D model (JSmol)	Interactive image
ChEBI	CHEBI:55443
ChemSpider	60494
ECHA InfoCard	100.004.165
PubChem CID	67149
UNII	3ET7L3AG0V
CompTox Dashboard (EPA)	DTXSID9059547
- InChI: InChI=1S/C8H9NO3/c10-7-3-1-6(2-4-7)9-5-8(11)12/h1-4,9-10H,5H2,(H,11,12) Key: WRUZLCLJULHLEY-UHFFFAOYSA-N; InChI=1/C8H9NO3/c10-7-3-1-6(2-4-7)9-5-8(11)12/h1-4,9-10H,5H2,(H,11,12) Key: WRUZLCLJULHLEY-UHFFFAOYAB
- SMILES: O=C(O)CNc1ccc(O)cc1

Properties
Chemical formula	C_{8}H_{9}NO_{3}
Molar mass	167.16 g/mol
Appearance	white powder
Density	1.411 g/mL
Melting point	244 °C (471 °F; 517 K)
Boiling point	446.3 °C (835.3 °F; 719.5 K)
- Except where otherwise noted, data are given for materials in their standard state (at 25 °C [77 °F], 100 kPa). verify (what is ?) Infobox references

Glycin, or N-(4-hydroxyphenyl)glycine, is N-substituted p-aminophenol. It is a photographic developing agent used in classic black-and-white photography. It is not identical to, but derived from glycine, the proteinogenic amino acid. It is typically characterized as thin plates of white or silvery powder, although aged samples appear brown, as is typical for aminophenols. It is sparingly soluble in water and most organic solvents; it is readily soluble in alkalies and acids.

Glycin is structurally related to 4-aminophenol and metol. Decarboxylation of glycin gives metol. Glycin has a milder reduction potential than metol. The two developers have markedly different character. Glycin is slower-acting, but much longer-lasting in solution. Glycin is rarely used as a developing agent, primarily because it is expensive. In its dry form, it also has limited shelf life compared to metol and phenidone.

Glycin can be synthesized by treating p-aminophenol with chloroacetic acid.

Glycin is employed in some procedures of analytical chemistry.
