= Iron(III) citrate =

Chemical compound

- One of several ferric citrate complexes

Names
- IUPAC name iron(3+) 2-hydroxypropane-1,2,3-tricarboxylate
- Other names Xoanacyl

Identifiers
CAS Number	3522-50-7
3D model (JSmol)	Interactive image
ChEBI	CHEBI:144421
ChemSpider	55239
ECHA InfoCard	100.020.488
PubChem CID	61300
UNII	63G354M39Z
CompTox Dashboard (EPA)	DTXSID0037657
- InChI: InChI=1S/C6H8O7.Fe/c7-3(8)1-6(13,5(11)12)2-4(9)10;/h13H,1-2H2,(H,7,8)(H,9,10)(H,11,12);/q;+3/p-3 Key: NPFOYSMITVOQOS-UHFFFAOYSA-K
- SMILES: C(C(=O)[O-])C(CC(=O)[O-])(C(=O)[O-])O.[Fe+3]

Properties
Chemical formula	C_{6}H_{5}FeO_{7}
Molar mass	244.944 g·mol^{−1}
Appearance	dark orange-red brown solid
Solubility in water	~5 g/L in water

Pharmacology
ATC code	V03AE08 (WHO)
Legal status	EU: Rx-only
- Except where otherwise noted, data are given for materials in their standard state (at 25 °C [77 °F], 100 kPa). (what is ?) Infobox references

Ferric citrate or iron(III) citrate describes any of several complexes formed upon binding any of the several conjugate bases derived from citric acid with ferric ions. Most of these complexes are orange or red-brown. They contain two or more Fe(III) centers.

Ferric citrates contribute to the metabolism of iron by some organisms. Citrates, which are released by plant roots and by some microorganisms, can solubilize iron compounds in the soil. For example ferric hydroxide reacts with citrates to give form soluble complexes. This solubilization provides a pathway for the absorption of the ferric ions by various organisms.

Ferric citrate is used in medicine to regulate the blood levels of iron in patients with chronic kidney disease on dialysis. It acts by forming an insoluble compound with phosphate present in the diet and thus minimizing its uptake by the digestive system.

== Structure ==
Citrate forms a variety of coordination complexes with ferric ions. Some might be oligomers, and polymers. Thus, ferric citrate is not a single well-defined compound, but a family of compounds, many with similar formulas. These various forms can coexist in equilibrium. At physiological pH, ferric citrate forms an insoluble red polymer. In other conditions, it forms anionic complexes like [FeC_{6}H_{4}O_{7}]_{2}(H_{2}O)_{2}]^{2−}. In the presence of excess citrate anions, the iron forms negatively charged complexes like [Fe(C_{6}H_{4}O_{7})_{2}]^{5−} and [Fe_{9}O(C_{6}H_{4}O_{7})_{8}(H_{2}O)_{3}]^{7−}.

== Photoreduction ==
The Fe^{3+} ion in ferric citrate (as in many iron(III) carboxylates) is reduced by exposure to light, especially blue and ultraviolet, to Fe^{2+} (ferrous) ion with concomitant oxidation of the carboxyl group adjacent to the hydroxyl, yielding carbon dioxide and acetonedicarboxylate:

2Fe^{3+} + R_{2}-C(OH)-CO^{−}_{2} → 2Fe^{2+} + R_{2}-C=O + H^{+} + CO_{2}

where -R represents the group -CH_{2}CO^{−}_{2}. This reaction plays an important role in plant metabolism: iron is carried up from the roots as ferric citrate dissolved in the sap, and photoreduced in the leaves to iron(II) that can be transported into the cells.

== Society and culture ==
=== Legal status ===
In March 2025, the Committee for Medicinal Products for Human Use of the European Medicines Agency adopted a positive opinion, recommending the granting of a marketing authorization for the medicinal product Xoanacyl, intended for the treatment of concomitant hyperphosphatemia and iron deficiency in adults with chronic kidney disease. The active substance of is ferric citrate coordination complex. The applicant for this medicinal product is Averoa SAS. Xoanacyl was authorized for medical use in the European Union in June 2025.

== Additional reading ==
- Abrahamson HB, Rezvani AB, Brushmiller J (1994). "Photochemical and Spectroscopic Studies of Complexes, of Iron(III) with Citric Acid and Other Carboxylic Acids". Inorganica Chimica Acta. 226 (1–2): 117–127. doi:10.1016/0020-1693(94)04077-X.
