= Phenidone =

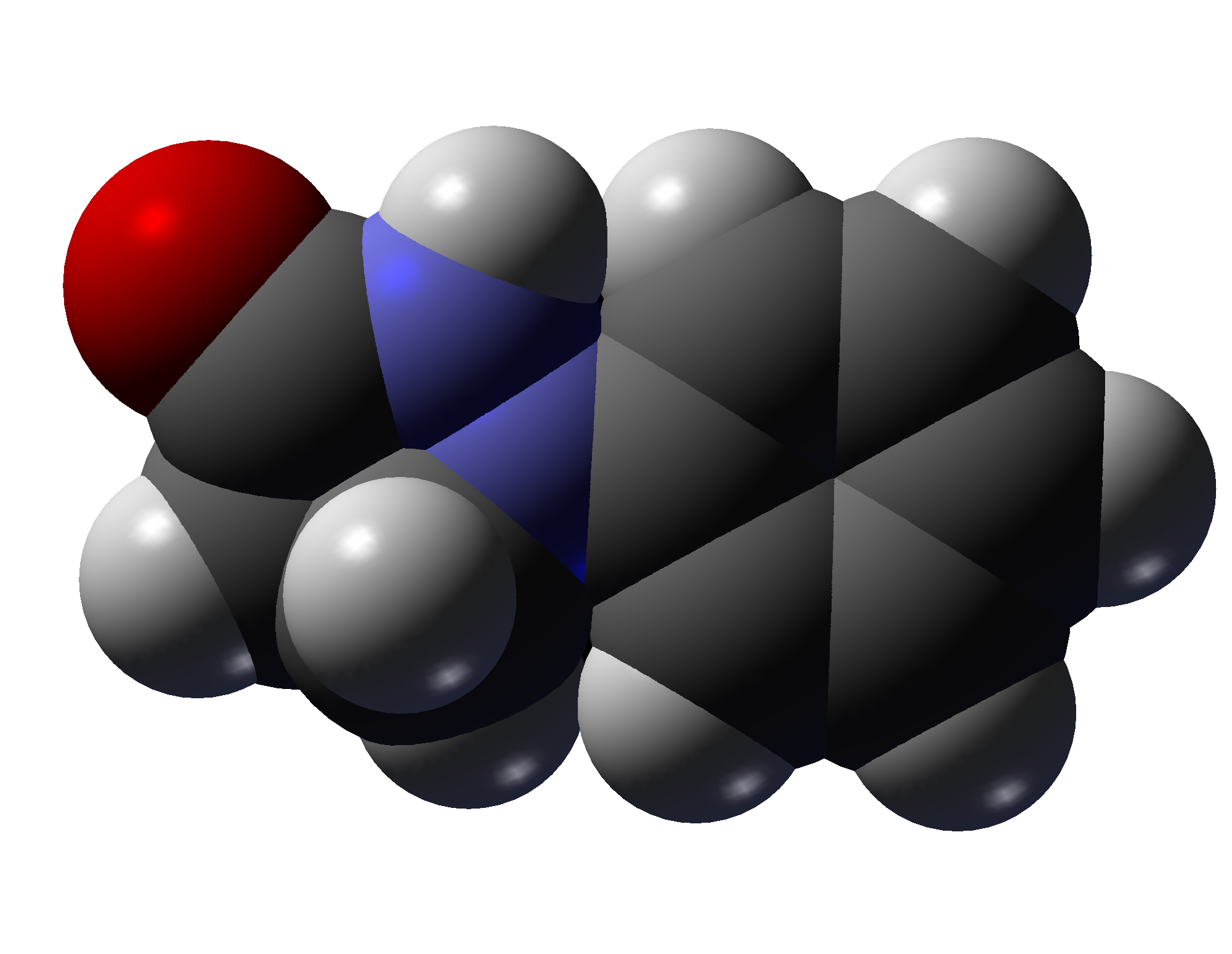

Names
- Preferred IUPAC name 1-Phenylpyrazolidin-3-one
- Other names phenyl pyrazolidone

Identifiers
CAS Number	92-43-3
3D model (JSmol)	Interactive image
ChEMBL	ChEMBL7660
ChemSpider	6823
ECHA InfoCard	100.001.960
EC Number	202-155-1
PubChem CID	7090
UNII	H0U5612P6K
CompTox Dashboard (EPA)	DTXSID1049433
- InChI: InChI=1S/C9H10N2O/c12-9-6-7-11(10-9)8-4-2-1-3-5-8/h1-5H,6-7H2,(H,10,12) Key: CMCWWLVWPDLCRM-UHFFFAOYSA-N; InChI=1/C9H10N2O/c12-9-6-7-11(10-9)8-4-2-1-3-5-8/h1-5H,6-7H2,(H,10,12) Key: CMCWWLVWPDLCRM-UHFFFAOYAF
- SMILES: O=C2NN(c1ccccc1)CC2

Properties
Chemical formula	C_{9}H_{10}N_{2}O
Molar mass	162.192 g·mol^{−1}
Appearance	Crystal leaflets or needles
Density	1.188 +/- 0.06 g/mol
Melting point	121 °C (250 °F; 394 K)
Boiling point	288.88 °C (551.98 °F; 562.03 K)
Solubility in water	10 g/100 ml at 100 °C
Solubility in ethanol	10 g/100 ml (hot)
Solubility in diethyl ether	practically insoluble

Hazards
- Occupational safety and health (OHS/OSH)
Main hazards	Harmful if swallowed
- GHS labelling
Pictograms	(GHS07: Exclamation mark) (GHS09: Environmental hazard)
Signal word	Warning
Hazard statements	H302, H411
Precautionary statements	P264, P270, P273, P301+P312, P330, P391, P501
Safety data sheet (SDS)	External MSDS
- Except where otherwise noted, data are given for materials in their standard state (at 25 °C [77 °F], 100 kPa). verify (what is ?) Infobox references

Phenidone (1-phenyl-3-pyrazolidinone) is an organic compound that is primarily used as a photographic developer. It has ten to eighteen times the amount of efficiency and stability as Metol, capable of achieving the same level of development in both less time and at a lower concentration. It also has low toxicity and unlike some other developers, does not cause dermatitis upon skin contact. As a developer, Phenidone is typically used in conjunction with hydroquinone for black and white photography and performs better at lower pH levels (about 9.8-10.4). This is comparable to Metol whose working pH is approximately 10.3.

Phenidone is Ilford's trademark for this material, which was first filed on Feb. 24, 1953, but has since expired. Although the compound was first prepared in 1890; it was not until 1940 that J. D. Kendall, in the laboratories of Ilford Limited, discovered the reducing properties of this compound. Large scale production did not become feasible until 1951. It began to be used by large companies, such as Agfa/Orwo, in the 1960s in place of Metol.

Phenidone functions as a reducing agent. It converts to the N-phenyl-hydroxypyrazole. It is oxidized in acidic conditions, contributing the electrons it loses to reduce silver halides such as those found in film:

Reaction of phenidone with silver bromide, as occurs in photographic development

Phenidone is also a dual cyclooxygenase/lipoxygenase inhibitor, capable of blocking the synthesis of arachidonic acid, which plays a role in causing inflammation in systemic inflammatory response syndrome and neuronal damage in kainic acid-induced seizures.

== Preparation ==
Phenidone can be prepared by heating phenyl hydrazine with 3-chloropropanoic acid.
