= Hydroquinone =

Chemical compound

- Hydroquinone

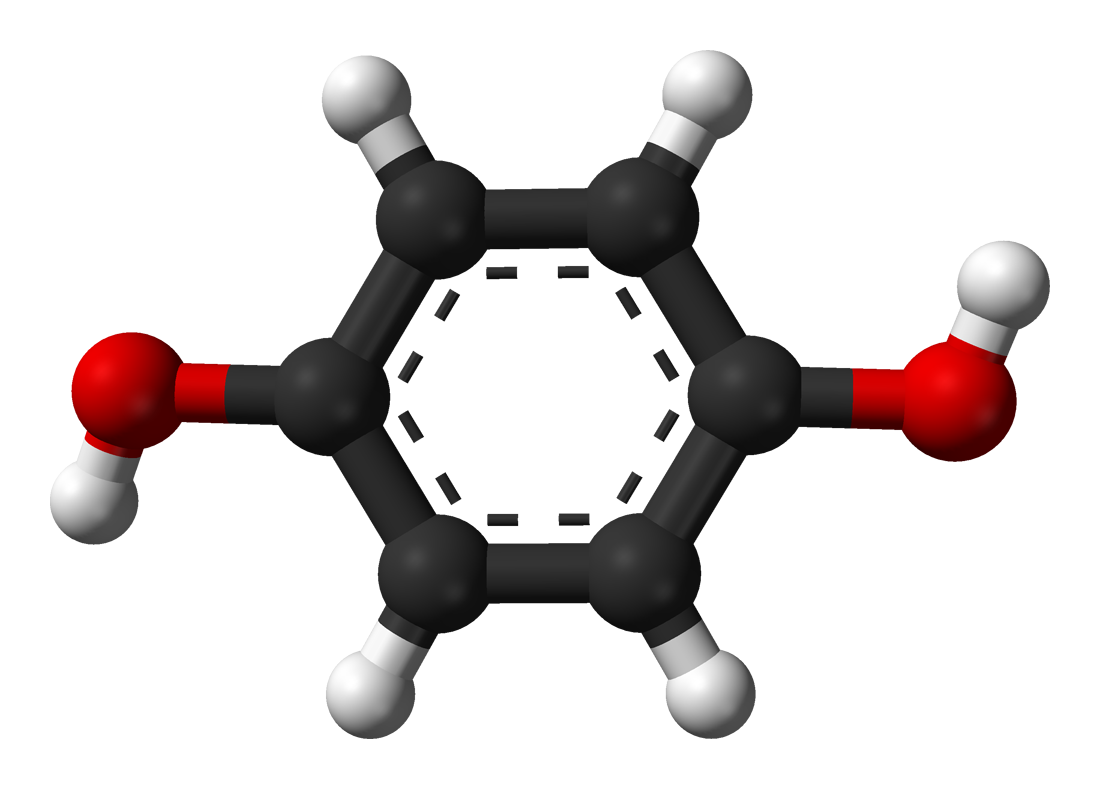

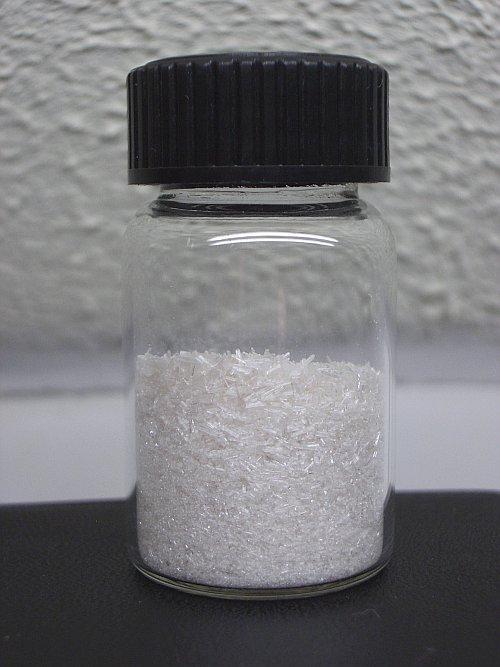

Names
- Preferred IUPAC name Benzene-1,4-diol
- Other names Hydroquinone; Idrochinone; Quinol; 4-Hydroxyphenol; 1,4-Dihydroxybenzene p-Dihydroxybenzene p-Benzenediol

Identifiers
CAS Number	123-31-9
3D model (JSmol)	Interactive image
Beilstein Reference	605970
ChEBI	CHEBI:17594
ChEMBL	ChEMBL537
ChemSpider	764
DrugBank	DB09526
ECHA InfoCard	100.004.199
EC Number	204-617-8
Gmelin Reference	2742
KEGG	D00073
PubChem CID	785
RTECS number	MX3500000
UNII	XV74C1N1AE
UN number	3077, 2662
CompTox Dashboard (EPA)	DTXSID7020716
- InChI: InChI=1S/C6H6O2/c7-5-1-2-6(8)4-3-5/h1-4,7-8H Key: QIGBRXMKCJKVMJ-UHFFFAOYSA-N; InChI=1/C6H6O2/c7-5-1-2-6(8)4-3-5/h1-4,7-8H Key: QIGBRXMKCJKVMJ-UHFFFAOYAX
- SMILES: c1cc(ccc1O)O

Properties
Chemical formula	C_{6}H_{6}O_{2}
Molar mass	110.112 g·mol^{−1}
Appearance	White solid
Density	1.3 g cm^{−3}, solid
Melting point	172 °C (342 °F; 445 K)
Boiling point	287 °C (549 °F; 560 K)
Solubility in water	5.9 g/100 mL (15 °C)
Vapor pressure	10^{−5} mmHg (20 °C)
Acidity (pK_{a})	9.9
Magnetic susceptibility (χ)	−64.63×10^{−6} cm^{3}/mol

Structure
Dipole moment	1.4±0.1 D

Pharmacology
ATC code	D11AX11 (WHO)

Hazards
- GHS labelling
Pictograms	(GHS05: Corrosive) (GHS07: Exclamation mark) (GHS08: Health hazard) (GHS09: Environmental hazard)
Signal word	Danger
Hazard statements	H302, H317, H318, H341, H351, H400
Precautionary statements	P201, P202, P261, P264, P270, P272, P273, P280, P281, P301+P312, P302+P352, P305+P351+P338, P308+P313, P310, P321, P330, P333+P313, P363, P391, P405, P501
NFPA 704 (fire diamond)	2 1 0
Flash point	165 °C (329 °F; 438 K)
- Lethal dose or concentration (LD, LC)
LD_{50} (median dose)	490 mg/kg (mammal, oral); 245 mg/kg (mouse, oral); 200 mg/kg (rabbit, oral); 320 mg/kg (rat, oral); 550 mg/kg (guinea pig, oral); 200 mg/kg (dog, oral); 70 mg/kg (cat, oral)
- NIOSH (US health exposure limits)
PEL (Permissible)	TWA 2 mg/m^{3}
REL (Recommended)	C 2 mg/m^{3} [15-minute]
IDLH (Immediate danger)	50 mg/m^{3}

Related compounds
Related benzenediols	Pyrocatechol; Resorcinol
Related compounds	1,4-benzoquinone
- Except where otherwise noted, data are given for materials in their standard state (at 25 °C [77 °F], 100 kPa). verify (what is ?) Infobox references

Hydroquinone, also known as benzene-1,4-diol or quinol, is an aromatic organic compound that is a type of phenol, a derivative of benzene, having the chemical formula C_{6}H_{4}(OH)_{2}. It has two hydroxyl groups bonded to a benzene ring in a para position. It is a white granular solid. Substituted derivatives of this parent compound are also referred to as hydroquinones. The name "hydroquinone" was coined by Friedrich Wöhler in 1843.

In 2023, it was the 274th most commonly prescribed medication in the United States, with more than 800,000 prescriptions.

== Production ==
Hydroquinone is produced industrially in two main ways.

- The most widely used route is similar to the cumene process in reaction mechanism and involves the dialkylation of benzene with propene to give 1,4-diisopropylbenzene. This compound reacts with air to afford the bis(hydroperoxide), which is structurally similar to cumene hydroperoxide and rearranges in acid to give acetone and hydroquinone.
- A second route involves hydroxylation of phenol over a catalyst. The conversion uses hydrogen peroxide and affords a mixture of hydroquinone and its ortho isomer catechol (benzene-1,2-diol):

C_{6}H_{5}OH + H_{2}O_{2} → C_{6}H_{4}(OH)_{2} + H_{2}O

Other, less common methods include:

- The 1960s saw extensive research into the synthesis of hydroquinone from acetylene and carbon monoxide via catalytic iron pentacarbonyl. Rhodium or ruthenium can substitute for iron as the catalyst with favorable chemical yields, but are not typically used due to the cost of recovery from the reaction mixture.
- Hydroquinone and its derivatives can also be prepared by oxidation of various electron-rich benzene derivatives, such as phenols, aniline, and DIPB. Examples include Elbs persulfate oxidation and Dakin oxidation.
- Hydroquinone was first obtained in 1820 by the French chemists Pelletier and Caventou via the dry distillation of quinic acid.
- Hydrolysis of chlorophenol.

The latter two methods are generally less atom-economical than oxidation with hydrogen peroxide, as are certain industrial implementations of the peroxide oxidation. Their commercial practice in China produced serious pollution in 2022.

== Reactions ==
The reactivity of hydroquinone's hydroxyl groups resembles that of other phenols, being weakly acidic. The resulting conjugate base easily undergoes O-alkylation to give mono- and diethers. Similarly, hydroquinone is highly susceptible to ring substitution via Friedel–Crafts alkylation. This reaction is often used for the production of several popular antioxidants, namely 2-tert-butyl-4-methoxyphenol (BHA). The useful dye quinizarin is produced by diacylation of hydroquinone with phthalic anhydride.

=== Redox ===
Hydroquinone can be reversibly oxidised under mild conditions to give benzoquinone. Naturally occurring hydroquinone derivatives, such as coenzyme Q, exhibit similar reactivity, wherein one hydroxyl group is exchanged for an amino group. Given the conditional reversibility and relative ubiquity of reagents, oxidation reactions of hydroquinones and hydroquinone derivatives are of significant commercial use, often used at an industrial scale.

When colorless hydroquinone and benzoquinone—bright yellow in solid form—are cocrystallized at a 1:1 ratio, a dark-green crystalline charge-transfer complex (melting point 171 °C), known as quinhydrone (C_{6}H_{6}O_{2}·C_{6}H_{4}O_{2}), is formed. This complex dissolves in hot water, dissociating both quinone molecules in solution.

=== Amination ===
An important reaction involves the conversion of hydroquinone to its mono- and di-amine derivatives. One such derivative, methylaminophenol, used in photography, is produced according to the stoichiometry:

C_{6}H_{4}(OH)_{2} + CH_{3}NH_{2} → HOC_{6}H_{4}NHCH_{3} + H_{2}O

Diamines—used in the rubber industry as antiozone agents—are aminated from aniline, and are formed via a similar pathway:

C_{6}H_{4}(OH)_{2} + 2 C_{6}H_{5}NH_{2} → C_{6}H_{4}(N(H)C_{6}H_{5})_{2} + 2 H_{2}O

== Uses ==
Hydroquinone has a variety of uses principally associated with its action as a reducing agent that is soluble in water. It is a major component in most black and white photographic developers for film and paper, where, with the compound metol, it reduces silver halides to elemental silver.

There are various other uses associated with its reducing power. As a polymerisation inhibitor, exploiting its antioxidant properties, hydroquinone prevents polymerization of acrylic acid, methyl methacrylate, cyanoacrylate, and other monomers that are susceptible to radical-initiated polymerization. By acting as a free radical scavenger, hydroquinone serves to prolong the shelf life of light-sensitive resins such as preceramic polymers.

Hydroquinone can lose a hydrogen cation from both hydroxyl groups to form a diphenolate ion. The disodium diphenolate salt of hydroquinone is used as an alternating comonomer unit in the production of the polymer PEEK.

=== Skin depigmentation ===
Hydroquinone is used topically for skin whitening, either alone or in combination with other topical agents. It is the most effective treatment for hyperpigmentation. It does not have the same predisposition to cause dermatitis as metol does. This is a prescription-only ingredient in some countries, including the member states of the European Union under Directives 76/768/EEC:1976.

Its skin-lightening effect was first reported in 1936. In the 1950s, it was available as part of a sunscreen formulation in southern regions of the USA. Its skin-lightening effect was observed as a fortuitous side-effect. In 1961, it was trialed for hyperpigmentation. In 1975, a topical combination of hydroquinone 5%, tretinoin 0.1% and dexamethasone 0.1% was trialed for melasma, ephelides and postinflammatory hyperpigmentation.

In 2006, United States Food and Drug Administration (FDA) revoked its previous approval of hydroquinone and proposed a ban on all over-the-counter preparations. The FDA officially banned hydroquinone in 2020 as part of a larger reform of the over-the-counter drug review process. The FDA stated that hydroquinone cannot be ruled out as a potential carcinogen. This conclusion was reached based on the extent of absorption in humans and the incidence of neoplasms in rats in several studies where adult rats were found to have increased rates of tumours, including thyroid follicular cell hyperplasias, anisokaryosis (variation in nuclei sizes), mononuclear cell leukemia, hepatocellular adenomas and renal tubule cell adenomas. The Campaign for Safe Cosmetics has also highlighted concerns.

Numerous studies have revealed that hydroquinone, if taken orally, can cause exogenous ochronosis, a disfiguring disease in which blue-black pigments are deposited onto the skin; however, skin preparations containing the ingredient are administered topically. The FDA had classified hydroquinone in 1982 as a safe product—generally recognized as safe and effective (GRASE). Additional studies under the National Toxicology Program (NTP) were suggested to determine whether there is a risk to humans from the use of hydroquinone. NTP evaluation showed some evidence of long-term carcinogenic and genotoxic effects.

While hydroquinone remains widely prescribed for treatment of hyperpigmentation, questions raised about its safety profile by regulatory agencies in the EU, Japan, and the USA encourage the search for other agents with comparable efficacy. Several such agents are already available or under research, including azelaic acid, kojic acid, retinoids, cysteamine, topical steroids, glycolic acid, and other substances. One of these, 4-butylresorcinol, has been proven to be more effective at treating melanin-related skin disorders by a wide margin, as well as safe enough to be made available over the counter.

In the anthraquinone process, substituted hydroquinones, typically anthrahydroquinone, are used to produce hydrogen peroxide, which forms spontaneously on reaction with oxygen. The type of substituted hydroquinone is selected depending on reactivity and recyclability.

== Natural occurrences ==
Hydroquinones are one of the two primary reagents in the defensive glands of bombardier beetles, along with hydrogen peroxide (and perhaps other compounds, depending on the species), which collect in a reservoir. The reservoir opens through a muscle-controlled valve onto a thick-walled reaction chamber. This chamber is lined with cells that secrete catalases and peroxidases. When the contents of the reservoir are forced into the reaction chamber, the catalases and peroxidases rapidly break down the hydrogen peroxide and catalyze the oxidation of the hydroquinones into p-quinones. These reactions release free oxygen and generate enough heat to bring the mixture to the boiling point and vaporize about a fifth of it, producing a hot spray from the beetle's abdomen.

Hydroquinone is thought to be the active toxin in Agaricus hondensis mushrooms.

Hydroquinone is one of the chemical constituents of the natural product propolis.

It is also one of the chemical compounds found in castoreum. This compound is gathered from the beaver's castor sacs.
