= Outline of photography =

Art and practice of creating images by recording light

The following outline is provided as an overview of and topical guide to photography:

Photography is the art, application, and practice of creating images by recording light, either electronically by means of an image sensor, or chemically by means of a light-sensitive material such as photographic film. It is employed in many fields of science, manufacturing (e.g., photolithography), and business, as well as its more direct uses for art, film and video production, recreational purposes, hobby, and mass communication. A person who operates a camera to capture or take photographs is called a photographer, while the captured image, also known as a photograph, is the result produced by the camera.

== Areas of practice ==
=== Applied photography ===
==== Scientific photography ====
- Aerial photography
- Aerial archaeology
- Astrophotography
- Autoradiography
- Cartography and photography
- Chronophotography
- Fundus photography
- Geophotography
- Phototherapy
- Pseudocolor
- Remote sensing
- Schlieren photography
- Scientific visualization
- Visual anthropology

===== Scientific imaging =====
- Acoustic holography
- Dark-field microscopy
- Electron microscope
- False-color
- High-speed photography
- Holography
- Kirlian photography
- Photogrammetry
- Photomicrography
- Multispectral imaging
  - Ultraviolet photography
  - Infrared photography
  - Full-spectrum photography

====== Medical imaging ======
Creating images of the human body or parts of it, to diagnose or examine disease.

- Bioluminescence imaging – a technique for studying laboratory animals using luminescent protein.
- Calcium imaging – determining the calcium status of a tissue using fluorescent light.
- Diffuse optical imaging – using near-infrared light to generate images of the body.
- Diffusion-weighted imaging – a type of MRI that uses water diffusion.
- Endoscopy – a procedure using an endoscope to examine the interior of a hollow organ or cavity of the body.
- Fluorescence lifetime imaging – using the decay rate of a fluorescent sample.
- Fluorescence image-guided surgery – used to detect fluorescently labelled structures during surgery.
- Gallium imaging – a nuclear medicine method for the detection of infections and cancers.
- Imaging agent – a chemical designed to allow clinicians to determine whether a mass is benign or malignant.
- Imaging studies – which includes many medical imaging techniques.
- Magnetic resonance imaging (MRI) – a non-invasive method to render images of living tissues.
- Microscopy – creating images of objects or features too small to be detectable by the naked human eye.
- Molecular imaging – used to study molecular pathways inside organisms.
- Non-contact thermography – is the field of thermography that derives diagnostic indications from infrared images of the human body.
- Nuclear medicine – uses administered radioactive substances to create images of internal organs and their function.
- Optical imaging – using light as an investigational tool for biological research and medical diagnosis.
- Optoacoustic imaging – using the photothermal effect, for the accuracy of spectroscopy with the depth resolution of ultrasound.
- Photoacoustic Imaging – a technique to detect vascular disease and cancer using non-ionizing laser pulses.
- Ultrasound imaging – using very high frequency sound to visualize muscles and internal organs.

==== Commercial photography ====
- Celebrity photography
- Concert photography
- Fashion photography
- Food photography
- Freelance photography
- Head shot
- Industrial photography
- Kodak Girl
- Product photography "knolling"
- Sports photography
- Stock photography
- Wedding photography
- Yearbook
- "You press the button, we do the rest"

==== Police and military photography ====
- Forensic photography
- Mug shot
- War photography

=== Social dimensions of photography ===
- Blind photography
- Conservation and restoration of photographs
- Visual anthropology
- Vernacular photography
  - Selfie

==== Photojournalism ====
- Documentary photography
- Life (magazine)
- List of photojournalists
- Narrative photography
- Paparazzi
- Photo-essay
- Social documentary photography
- Social photography
- War photography

==== Political dimensions of photography ====
- Agitprop
- Censorship
- Conservation photography
- List of photographers of the civil rights movement
- Propaganda

==== Photography and desire ====
- Erotic photography
- Fashion photography
- Glamour photography
- List of BDSM photographers
- Nude photography
- Pin-up model
- Pornography

=== Subjects, styles, and formats ===
==== Photographic subjects ====
- Architectural photography
- Fireworks photography
- Nature photography
  - Cloudscape photography
  - Conservation photography
  - Landscape photography
  - Underwater photography
  - Wildlife photography
- Night photography
- Portrait photography
- Street photography
- Subminiature photography

==== Photographic styles ====
- Abstract photography
- Candid photography
- Environmental portrait
- Low-key photography
- Old-time photography
- Snapshot
- Still life
- Straight photography

==== Photographic formats ====
See also: Scientific imaging

- Black and white
- Color photography
- Chemigram
- Chemogram
- Digital photography
- Lo-fi photography
- Lomography
- Monochrome photography
- Panoramic photography
- Photogram
- Stereoscopic photography
- Virtual reality
- Xerography

=== Art and theory ===
==== Art and photography ====
- Abstraction
- American Realism
- Appropriation
- Art
- Artists books
- Conceptual photography
- Modernism
- Exhibitions
  - The Family of Man
- Festivals

==== Theory ====
- Aesthetics
- Art criticism
- Conceptual photography
- Constructed reality
- Decisive moment
- Deconstruction
- Ideology
- Memory
- Truth
- Representation
- Semiotics
- Social representation
- Time and space
- Visual anthropology
- Voyeurism

== Photographic technology ==
See also: History of photographic technology

- Cabinet photograph
- Color photography
- Digital photography
- Digiscoping
- Microphotography
- Photogenic drawings
- Photometry
- Stereoscope

=== Image capture ===
- Bracketing
- Burst mode
- Exposure
- Time-lapse photography

==== Camera ====
===== Types of camera =====
- Box camera
- Brownie camera
- Camera obscura
- Camera phone
- Digital single-lens reflex camera
- Diana camera
- Digital camera
  - Zebra patterning
- Disposable camera
- Field camera
- Instant or polaroid camera
- Pinhole camera
- Point and shoot camera
- Press camera
- Rangefinder camera
- Single-lens reflex camera
- Three-CCD camera
- Twin-lens reflex camera
- Toy camera
- View camera

===== Parts of a camera =====
- Camera back
- Shutter
- Hotshoe
- Aperture
- Viewfinder

==== Lens ====
- Fisheye lens
- Lens
- Lens hood
- Perspective control lens
- Telecentric lens
- Telephoto lens
- Wide-angle lens
- Zoom lens

==== Accessories ====
- Cable release
- Filter
- Monopod
- Tripod

==== Film ====
- 35 mm
- Anti-halation backing
- Film base
- Film developing
- Film format
- Film holder
- Film speed
  - Sensitometry
- Film stock
- Grain
- Photographic plate
- Infrared film
- Instant film
- Negative
- Reversal film

==== Lighting ====
- Beauty dish
- Fill light
- Flash
  - Flash synchronization
  - Red-eye effect
- Gobo
- Guide number
- Key light
- Light meter
- Monolight
- Reflector
- Snoot
- Softbox

==== Photographic effects ====
- Bokeh
- Contre-jour
- Motion blur
- Sabattier effect

=== Photographic processing ===
- Airgraph
- Bas-relief
- Color
- Darkroom
- Developer
- Dufaycolor
- Dye coupler
- Enlarger
- Fixer
- Hand-coloring of photographs
  - Photographic print toning
- Heliograph
- Image stabilization
- Instant photography
- Lomography
- Minilab
- Orthochromatic
- Photosculpture
- Photographic printing
- Safelight
- Solarization
- Stop bath

==== Digital processing ====
- Adobe Photoshop
- Digital printing
- High-dynamic-range imaging (HDR)
- Image histogram
- Scanning
  - Film scanner
- Unsharp masking

==== Processes ====
- Alternative process
  - Bleach bypass
  - Bromoil process
  - Cross processing
  - Cyanotype
  - Double exposure
  - Gum bichromate
  - Infrared
  - Oil print process
  - Pinhole
  - Platinum process
  - Polaroid art
  - Redscale
  - Sprocket hole
  - Through the Viewfinder
- C-41 process
- Collodion process
- Contact printing
- Dodging and burning
- Dye transfer process
- E-6 process
- Gelatin silver process
- Half-tone process
- K-14 process
- Lippmann process
- Printing
- Process camera
- Push printing
- Push processing
- Sun printing
- Wet collodion process

==== Papers, prints, and -types ====
- Anthotype
- Blotting paper
- Bromide paper
- Calotype
- Carbro
- Chromogenic print
- Chrysotype
- Cyanotype
- Contact print
- Gum printing
- Hillotype
- Hyalotype
- Kallitype
- Litmus paper
- Melainotype
- Paper negative
- Physautotype
- Print permanence
- Photograph
- Woodburytype

=== Photographic techniques ===
- Afocal photography
- Chemigram
- Chemogram
- Harris shutter
- Kinetic photography
- Kite aerial photography
- Light painting
- Macro photography
- Miniature faking
- Panning
- Photogram
- Pseudo-solarization
- Rephotography
- Rollout photography
- Stereoscopy
- Stopping down
- Tilt–shift photography
- Time-lapse photography

== Photographic concepts ==
- Composition
  - Rule of thirds
  - Field of view
  - Headroom
  - Perspective (visual)
  - Lead room
  - Framing
  - Golden triangle (composition)
- Density
  - Callier effect
  - Characteristic curve
  - Contrast
  - Reciprocity
- Exposure
  - Shutter speed
  - Aperture
  - F-number
  - Exposure compensation
  - Exposure value
  - Exposure latitude
  - Zone system
  - Metering mode
  - Time exposure
- Moire patterns

=== Optics ===
- Angle of view
- Chromatic aberration
- Field of view
- Focus
  - Autofocus
  - Depth of field
  - Depth of focus
  - Hyperfocal distance
  - Soft focus
- Distortion
- Electromagnetic spectrum
- Fourier optics
- Focal length
  - 35mm equivalent focal length
- Gaussian optics
- Lens flare
- Newton's rings
- Orb (optics)
- Optical transfer function
- Optical aberration
- Perspective
  - Perspective distortion
- Polarized light
- Vignetting

=== Color ===
- CMYK color model
- Color balance
- Color management
- Color photography
- Color space
- Color temperature
- Colorimetry
- Primary color
- RGB color model

=== Digital imaging ===
- Image Compression
- Gaussian blur
- Image histogram
  - Histogram equalization
- Image scaling
- Logarithms
- Noise
- Pixel
- Posterization

==== Digital image formats ====
- DNG
- GIF
- JPEG
- PNG
- RAW
- TIFF

== Photography organizations ==
- Farm Security Administration
- Missions Héliographiques
- National Geographic
- Royal Photographic Society
- Société française de photographie

=== Photographic equipment makers ===
- Canon
- Fujifilm
- Hasselblad
- Ilford
- Kodak
- Leica
- Minolta
- Nikon
- Pentax
- Polaroid

=== Museums and libraries ===
Museums and libraries with significant photography collections.

- Center for Creative Photography
- Family of Man Museum, Clervaux Castle, Luxembourg
- George Eastman Museum
- Getty Museum
- Moreira Salles Institute
- International Center of Photography
- International Photography Hall of Fame and Museum
- Library of Congress
- Metropolitan Museum of Art
- Musée d'Orsay
- Museo de Arte de Lima
- Museum of Contemporary Photography Chicago
- Museum of Fine Arts, Houston
- Museum of Jewish Heritage
- Museum of Modern Art
- National Gallery of Art, Washington DC
- National Portrait Gallery UK
- National Portrait Gallery US
- Niepce Museum
- New York Public Library
- Smithsonian American Art Museum
- Tate Galleries

== Photographers ==
- Men photographers
- List of photographers
- List of women photographers
- List of Jewish American photographers
- List of street photographers
- Photography by indigenous peoples of the Americas

=== Photographers by nationality ===
- List of US photographers
- List of Chinese photographers
- List of German photographers
- List of Greek photographers
- List of Korean photographers
- List of New Zealand women photographers
- List of Norwegian photographers
- List of Polish photographers
- List of Slovenian photographers
- List of Turkish photographers

== History of photography ==
=== History of photographic technology ===
- History of the camera
  - Camera obscura

==== Pioneers and inventors of photographic technology ====
- Hippolyte Bayard
- Louis Daguerre
- George Eastman
- Sergey Prokudin-Gorsky
- John Herschel
- Eadweard Muybridge
- Nicéphore Niépce
- William Fox Talbot
- Thomas Wedgwood

==== Historic photographic processes ====
- Ambrotype
- Autochrome Lumière
- Calotype
- Collodion process
- Cyanotype
- Daguerreotype
- Dufaycolor
- Heliography
- Platinum print
- Salt print
- Tintype

=== History of photography in culture and art ===
- Bauhaus
- Cliche-verre
- Dada
- Decisive moment
- Farm Security Administration
- Formalism
- Fotoform
- Futurism
- Gallery 291
- Group f.64
- Harlem Renaissance
- Impressionism
- The Linked Ring
- Modernism
- Neorealism
- Neue Sachlichkeit
- Neues Sehen / New Vision
- New Documents
- New Topographics
- Orientalism
- Photo-Secession
- Photomontage
- Pictorialism
- Pop art
- Postmodernism
- Realism
- Socialist realism
- Straight photography
- Surrealism
- Vortograph
- Wiener Aktionismus / Viennese Actionism

== Lists ==
- List of most expensive photographs
- List of photographs considered the most important
