= Olympus μ9000 =

Digital camera model

The Olympus μ-9000 (also known as the 'Stylus 9000') is the flagship model of Olympus' μ-Series line of point-and-shoot digital cameras. The μ Series consists of compact cameras characterized by small profiles, an optical zoom function, and a focus on stylish outward appearance.

== Specifications ==
Features	Specifications
Image Sensor	12 Megapixels (effective), 1/2.33" CCD
Focal Length/Lens Configuration	5.0 – 50.0mm (28 – 280mm equivalent in 35mm photography) 9 Lenses in 6 Groups, 5 Aspherical Lenses, 1 ED Lens
Zoom	10x Optical Zoom + 5x Digital Zoom
Maximum Aperture	F3.2 (W) / F5.9 (T)
Display	2.7 inches (6.9 cm) HyperCrystalTM III LCD with Backlight Boost, approx. 230,000 dots 5 Steps Brightness Adjustment
Focus System	CCD Contrast Detection
Focus Range (from lens surface)	Normal mode: Wide: 19.7" – infinity (0.5m – infinity) Tele: 39.4" - infinity (1.0m - infinity) Macro mode: Wide: 3.9" – infinity (0.1m – infinity) Tele: 35.4" – infinity (0.9m – infinity) Super Macro mode: 0.39–19.7 in (0.99–50.04 cm)
Focus Mode	iESP Auto, Spot AF, Face Detection AF
Shutter Speed	1/2000 sec. –1/4 sec. (up to 4 sec. in Night Scene mode)
ISO Sensitivity (SOS: Standard Output Sensitivity)	Auto, High Auto, 64, 100, 200, 400, 800, 1600
Exposure Metering	Digital ESP Metering, Spot Metering, Face Detection AE (when Face Detection AF is selected)
White Balance Control	Auto, Presets (Daylight, Overcast, Tungsten and 3 Fluorescents)
Exposure Compensation	±2 EV steps in 1/3 EV steps
Image File Format	Still Image: JPEG Movie: AVI Motion JPEG
Number of Recorded Pixels	12MP (3,968 x 2,976) 5MP (2,560 x 1,920) 3MP (2,048 x 1,536) 2MP (1,600 x 1,200) 1MP (1,280 x 960) VGA (640 x 480) 16:9 (1,920 x 1,080)
Motion Blur Suppression	Dual Image Stabilization
Shooting Modes	19 Shooting Modes; Intelligent Auto, Program Auto, Sensor-Shift Image Stabilization, Beauty Mode, Scene Modes (1. PORTRAIT, 2. LANDSCAPE, 3. NIGHT SCENE. 4. NIGHT+PORTRAIT, 5. SPORT, 6. INDOOR, 7. CANDLE, 8. SELF PORTRAIT, 9. SUNSET, 10. FIREWORKS, 11. CUISINE, 12. DOCUMENTS, 13. BEACH & SNOW, 14. PRE-CAPTURE MOVIE), Movie
Panorama	In-Camera Panorama, PC Panorama (Up to 10 frames automatically stitchable with Olympus Master software)
Continuous Shooting	High speed: 5.0 frames per second, 11 frames (3MP) Normal speed: 0.9 frames per second, 21 frames (12MP)
Shooting Assist Functions	Perfect Shot Preview, Histogram, Frame Assist, Voice Recording (records voice for 2–3 seconds in each shot to serve like a Voice Memo)
Movie Mode	AVI Movie (M-JPEG ~12–13 Mbit/s) with Sound (PCM, Mono, 8 bits, 64 kbit/s, 8 kHz): 640x480 (30/15fps) 320x240 (30/15fps)
Image Processing	TruePic III Image Processor
Noise Reduction	Set automatically at shutter speeds of 0.5 second or longer in specific scene modes
Image Playback	Still Image: Single, Index Display (4/9/16/25), Up to 10x Enlargement, Slideshow, Rotation, Calendar, Histogram, Voice Playback Movie: Normal, Fast-Forward, Reverse, Frame-by-Frame, Voice Playback
Playback Edit Effects	Still Image: Red-Eye Fix, Shadow Adjustment Edit, Beauty Fix, Resize, Cropping, Black & White, Sepia, Calendar, Saturation Movie: Frame Index
Flash	Built-in
Flash Modes	Auto (for low light and backlit conditions) Red-Eye Reduction Fill-in Off
Flash Working Range	Wide: 0.66 ft (0.20 m) – 17.7 ft (5.4 m) at ISO 800 Tele: 3.0 ft (0.91 m) – 9.8 ft (3.0 m) at ISO 800
Self-Timer	12 Seconds
Memory	45MB internal memory
Removable Media Card	xD-Picture Card (1 GB, 2 GB), microSD (MASD-1 microSD adapter is required)
Outer Connectors	Multi-Terminal (USB Connector, Audio/Video Output, DC Input*): Optional DC Coupler (CB-MA3) is required.
Auto-Connect USB	USB 2.0 High-Speed (USB Mass Storage)
System Requirements	Auto-Connect USB: Windows 2000/XP/VISTA with USB port, Mac OS X 10.3 or later with USB port Software: Windows 2000PRO/XP/VISTA, Mac OS X 10.3 - 10.5
Operating temperature/Humidity	Operation: 32° – 104 °F (0° – 40 °C) Storage: -4° – 140 °F (-20° – 60 °C) Operation: 30% – 90% Storage: 10% – 90%
Power Source	Li-ion Rechargeable Battery (LI-50B), AC Adapter (D-7AC) with the optional DC Coupler (CB-MA3)
Battery Life (CIPA DC-002)	250 shots
Dimension	3.8"W x 2.4"H x 1.2"D (96mm x 60mm x 31mm)
Weight	6.5 oz (180 g) without batteries and memory card

== Gallery ==
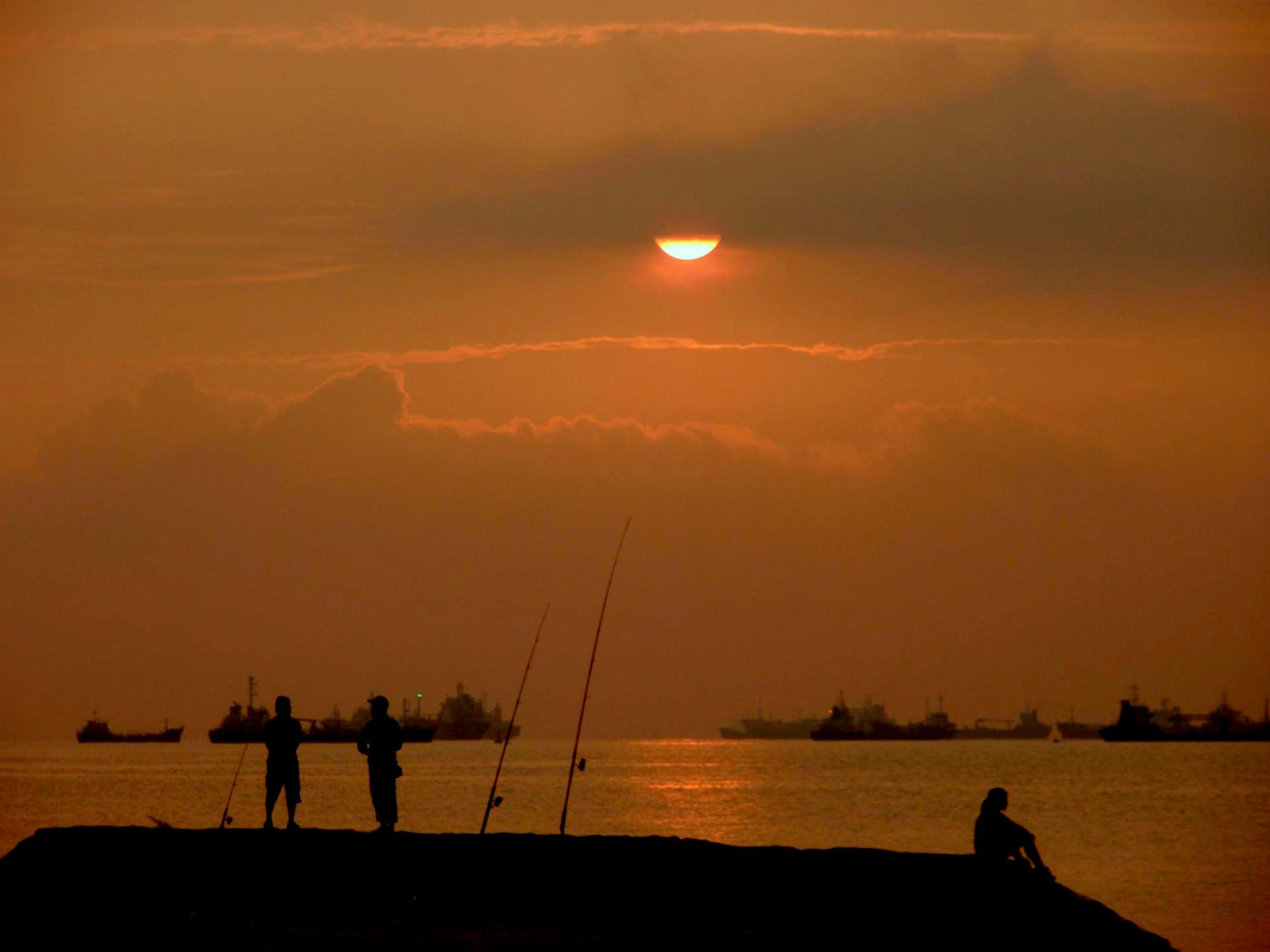
Image captured using Sunset shooting mode of Olympus μ-9000

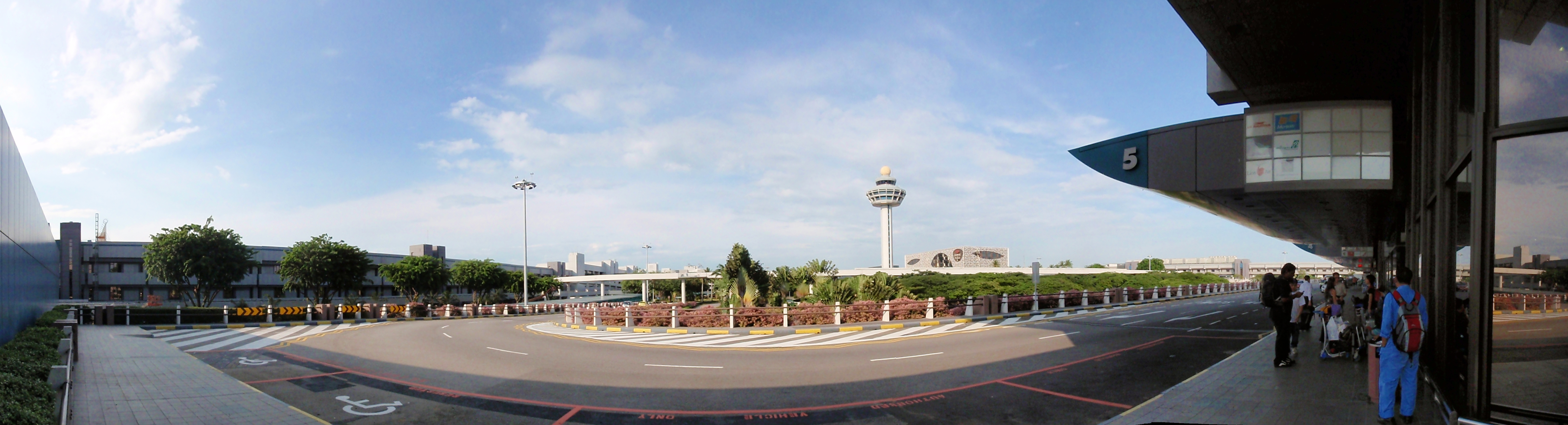
Images captured using Burst mode of Olympus μ-9000 and stitched together using Microsoft Research Image Composite Editor

== See also ==
- Olympus Corporation
- List of Olympus products
