= Joco Žnidaršič =

Slovenian photojournalist (1938–2022)

- Born: Šoštanj, Yugoslavia (present-day Slovenia); 30 March 1938
- Died: 28 November 2022 (aged 84); Ljubljana, Slovenia
- Occupation(s): Photojournalist, photo editor
- Known for: Documentary photographs

Joco Žnidaršič (20 March 1938 – 28 November 2022) was a Slovenian photojournalist and editor.

== Life ==
Žnidaršič was born in Šoštanj, Drava Banovina. By 1963, he completed 10 semesters of medical studies at the Medical Faculty of the University in Ljubljana. During his studies, he got involved in documentary and artistic photography and later fully focused on this activity. He was a photojournalist with Študentska tribuna, TT, Tovariš, and for 24 years, since 1974 to his retirement, as a photo editor at Delo. He was a freelance photojournalist and a co-owner of the Veduta AŽ company, which is publishing photobooks.

== Work ==
In addition to journalism, Žnidaršič in collaboration with other prominent writers (e.g. Matjaž Kmecl, Ciril Zlobec, Željko Kozinc) created numerous photobooks, which established him as one of the most prominent Slovenian artistic and documentary photographers. He created a number of them, some of the better known are Foto Joco Žnidaršič, Ljubljana, Bohinj, Slovenski vinogradi (Slovene Vineyards), Pot k očetu (himalajski potopis) (Travel to the Father: Himalaya Itinerary), Dobimo se na tržnici (Let's Meet at the Market), Golf na Slovenskem (Golf in the Slovene Lands), Deset let je Slovenija država (Slovenia Has Been a Country for Ten Years), Moja Slovenija (My Slovenia), Lipicanci (Lippizans), Večni Bohinj (The Eternal Bohinj), Zakladi Slovenije (Treasures of Slovenia, 2nd ed.), and Najlepša pot zeleni prstan Ljubljane (The Most Beautiful Trail: Ljubljana Green Ring). Critics assessed them with praise and the wide audience liked them very much. He also had a prominent photographic and editorship contribution in twenty other photobooks, of which the particularly successful were: Zakladi Slovenije (Treasures of Slovenia, 1st ed.), Vojna za Slovenijo (War for Slovenia), Lepa Slovenija (The Beautiful Slovenia), Planica (1st and 2nd ed.), Slovenija, lepotica Evrope (Slovenia, the Beauty of Europe), and Ljubljana, lepa in prijazna (Ljubljana, Beautiful and Friendly).

== Recognition ==
Joco Žnidaršič was awarded the title "Excellence FIAP" (EFIAP) in 1975. He held numerous exhibitions at home and abroad and was bestowed with over 50 other awards and recognitions, among which were Prešeren Fund Award, Župančič Award, Puhar Plaque for lifetime achievement, and Consortium veritatis, the highest Slovenian award for journalistic work. He was the first recipient of the World Press Photo award in Slovenia. In 2005, a documentary was broadcast about Žnidaršič on Slovenian national TV. In 2009, the President of Slovenia Danilo Türk awarded him the Golden Order of Merit for lifetime achievement in photography and a great contribution to the international visibility of Slovenia. In 2013, he received the Award of the City of Ljubljana, and in 2017, he was awarded the Order of Merit by Borut Pahor for his contribution to the Slovenia, My Country campaign.

== See also ==
- List of Slovenian photographers
