= Modic =

Modic may refer to:

- Modic changes of the bones of the spine
- Andrej Modić, Bosnian professional footballer
- Marko Modic, Slovenian photographer, painter and visual artist
