= Rollout photography =

Photographic technique for capturing objects

Rollout photography, a type of peripheral photography, is a process used to create a two-dimensional photographic image of a three-dimensional object. This process is the photographic equivalent of a cylindrical map projection in cartography. It is used predominantly for the projection of images of cylindrical objects such as vases or ceramic vessels. The objective of this process is to present to the observer a planar representation of the object's characteristics, most notably the illustrations or artwork extant on the outside surfaces of such vessels. This planar representation is captured using photographic imaging techniques.

== Technique ==
In the basic technique, using strip photography, a camera with a vertical slit aperture is positioned opposite a turntable on which an object is centered. Both the object and the camera are oriented as precisely as possible so as to eliminate aberrations due to the focusing mechanism of the camera, the aperture, and the characteristics of the object itself. As the object is rotated on the turntable, the film is exposed in small intervals corresponding to the dimensions of the aperture. Since the image is projected onto the film backwards and upside down, the turntable spins in the direction opposite of the direction of the film advance mechanism.

== History ==
In 1972, Justin Kerr worked with author & anthropologist Michael D. Coe to produce a book on ceramic vessels of the pre-Columbian Maya civilization. For this book Kerr had to photograph the ceramics section by section, and then have an artist combine the pictures into one. Since this was slow and did not accurately reproduce the images on the pottery, Kerr set out to find a technique that would make a single, fluid picture. However, at this time no cameras existed that were capable of making peripheral photographs. Therefore, from 1972 to 1978, Kerr created a new camera and essentially reinvented the art of rollout photography.

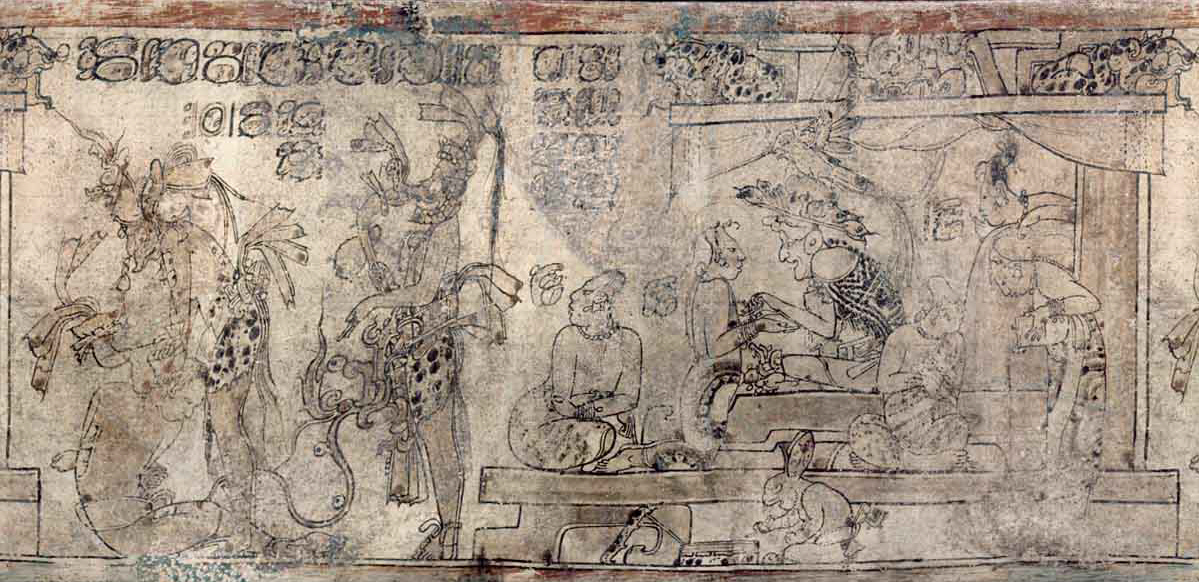
Example of a rollout photo of a Classic Maya vase

The technique had existed for years, so by using the methods listed above Justin Kerr succeeded in making a camera that captured the first Maya pottery vessel using rollout photography. The rollout technique was perfected through the use of a record turntable, clamps, and various pieces of wood and belts. The result was a clear and accurate reproduction of a tin can. From there Kerr moved on to Maya vessels. Each vase takes about two minutes to photograph, and is done all in one session. Kerr spends on average 6 hours a day in his studio working on Maya rollouts. Subsequently, Kerr began archiving every container he photographed. To date more than 1400 rollouts have been created. His first successful print was of an Olmec bowl, lent to him from Princeton University.

== See also ==
- Photography
- Outline of photography
- Image editing
