= Geophotography =

Photography of geologic features

Geophotography (also geo-photography or geological photography) is a subfield of geology that involves the use of photography or other imaging techniques in the visible or near-visible (e.g. ultraviolet, infrared) spectrum to realistically record objects, features, and processes of geological significance. Ultimately geophotography is motivated by a scientific comprehension or question and serves to accomplish a specific, useful goal in furthering the understanding of the aspect of geology that it addresses. However, crossover does occur from documentary to more artistic styles. As geology is, broadly, the study of the Earth, and often entails the study of large-scale features such as mountains and mountain belts, there is significant overlap between geophotography and landscape photography especially.

== History ==
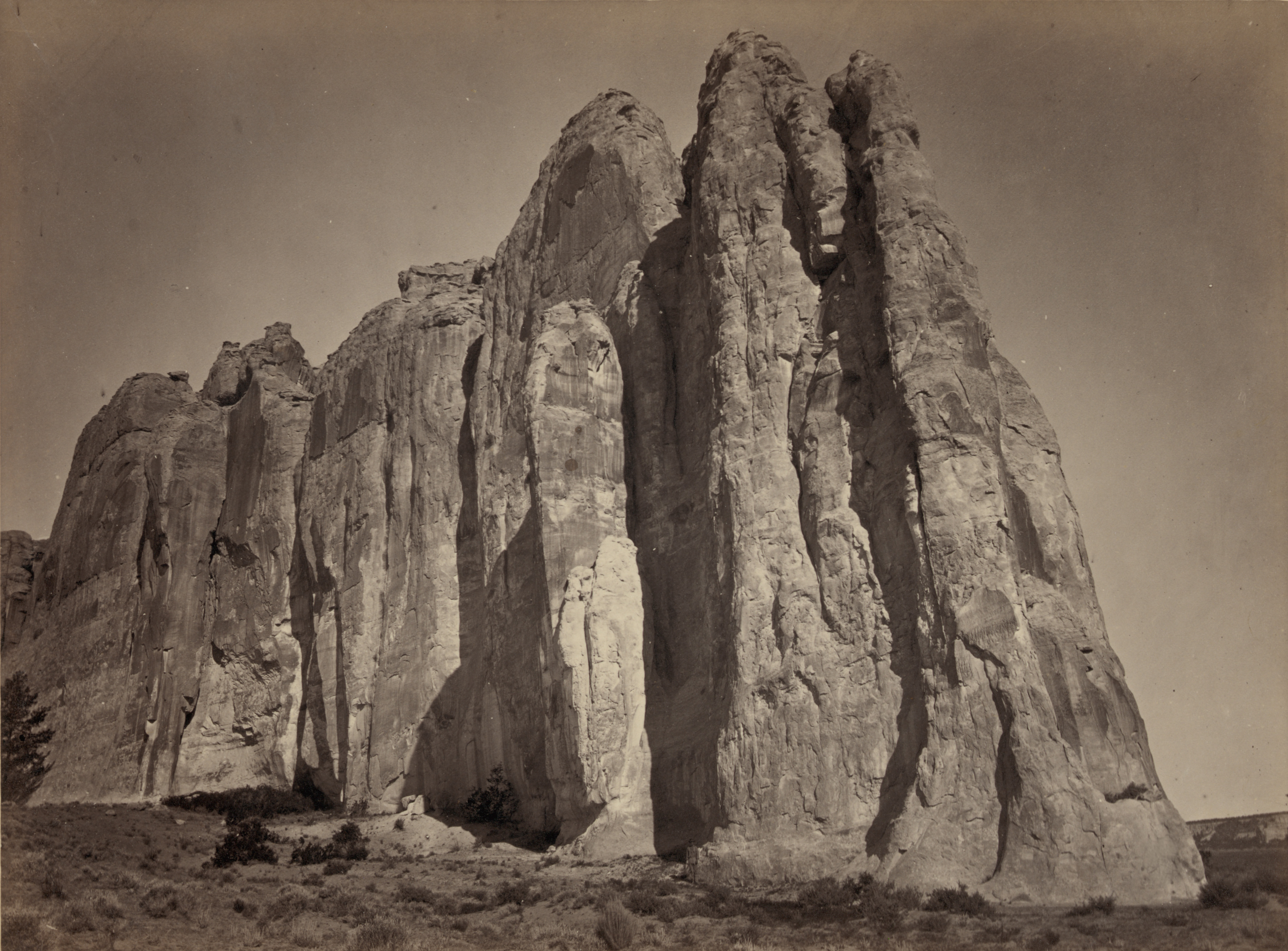
South side of Inscription Rock, New Mexico, by Timothy O'Sullivan, c. 1871

In the latter half of the 19th century, photography began to replace engravings and illustrations as the primary conveyor of visual information in books. Around the same time, geological surveys started collecting photographs as archives. In 1867, photographer Timothy H. O'Sullivan, who was then known for his depictions of the destructive nature of the American Civil War, joined Clarence King's geological survey of the 40th parallel between the Rocky Mountains and the Sierra Nevada. In 1871 he embarked on a similar expedition to document the landscape and geologic features of the 100th meridian and returned with images that proved geologically valuable and emphasized the West as a hospitable place for settlers. These images, and those from King's expedition, were among the first incorporated into the United States Geological Survey's Photographic Archive after its establishment in 1879. W. Jerome Harrison, then-curator of the Leicester Town Museum, published the first known book of geological photographs, detailing the geology of Leicestershire and Rutland, England, in 1877.

As photography became more ubiquitous, geological surveys began enlisting the help of full-time photographers as well as community volunteers. A Nature article from 1889 requests "photographs of localities, sections, or other features of geological interest in the United Kingdom" to be "placed before the Geological Section of the British Association" in an effort to unify the photographic surveys completed by miscellaneous and sundry local societies and expand any existing archives. The article also asks for "the names of local Societies, or persons who are willing to arrange for a photographic survey for geological purposes in their district." This marked the beginning of the type of large-scale survey photography that would go on to manifest itself in the realms of aerial photography, which was used as a survey tool by the USGS beginning just before World War I, and eventually satellite imagery.

== Modern usage and techniques ==
=== Field geophotography ===
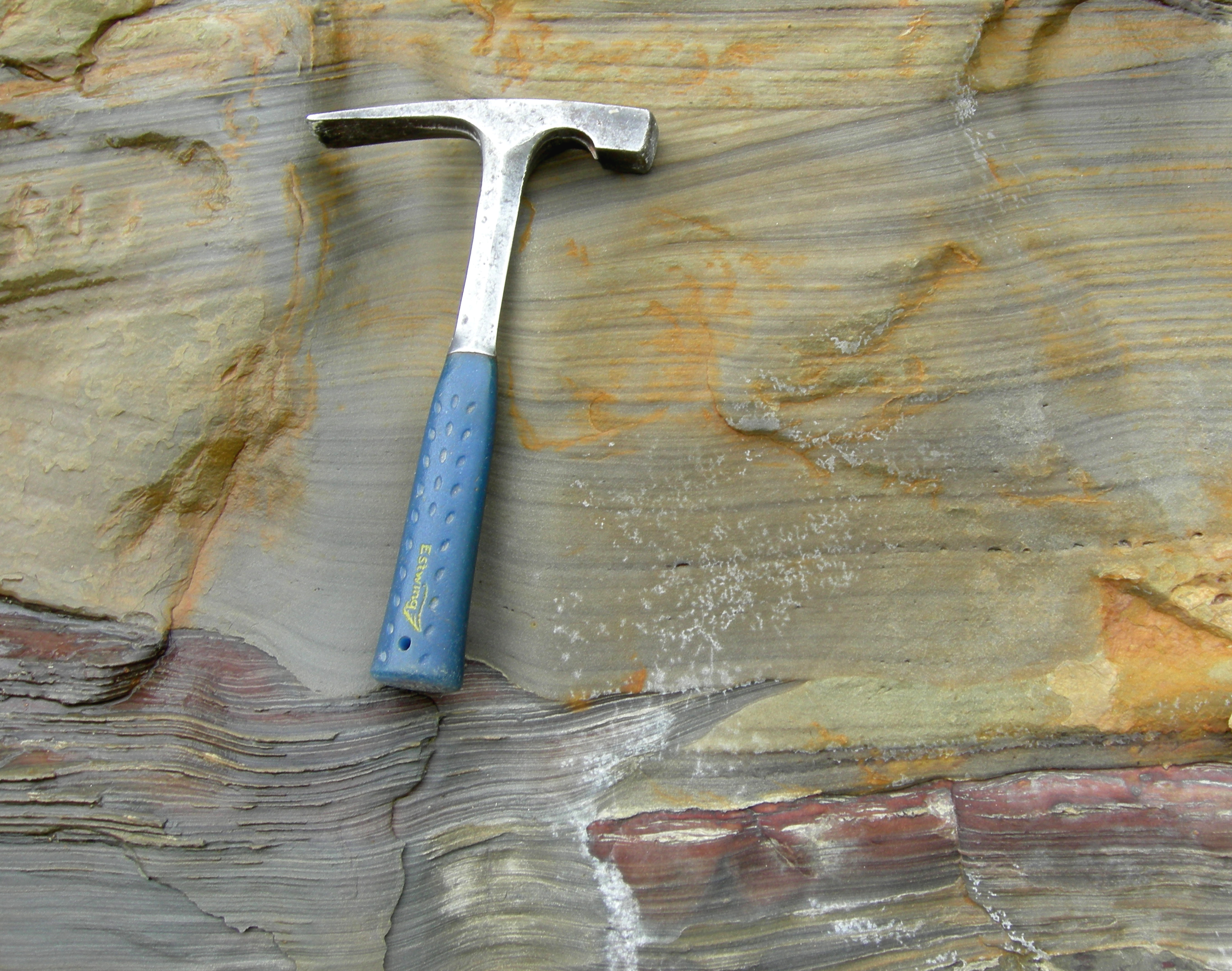
A field photograph of cross-bedding and scour in the Logan Formation (Mississippian) of Jackson County, Ohio, by Mark Wilson

Geophotography today takes numerous forms. At the most basic level, it can be accomplished using a film or digital Single-Lens Reflex (SLR) or "point-and-shoot" (compact) camera in the field or in the laboratory. In the field, special consideration is given to natural lighting of the object or feature being photographed. Scale is especially important in geophotography, and meter sticks, rock hammers, people, lens caps, coins, or other objects that are carried on-hand, are often placed in the frame to indicate the size of the feature being photographed. Images are generally cataloged automatically or manually with location information and grid reference (or latitude and longitude) data. These types of photographs are consistently used as visual aids in papers, field trip guides, reports, reviews, and posters. However, they are increasingly finding use as trackers of small-scale morphologic change, wherein photographs are repeatedly taken of particular features or places over time to show how the features or places are changing on a diurnal to annual time scale.

=== Laboratory geophotography ===
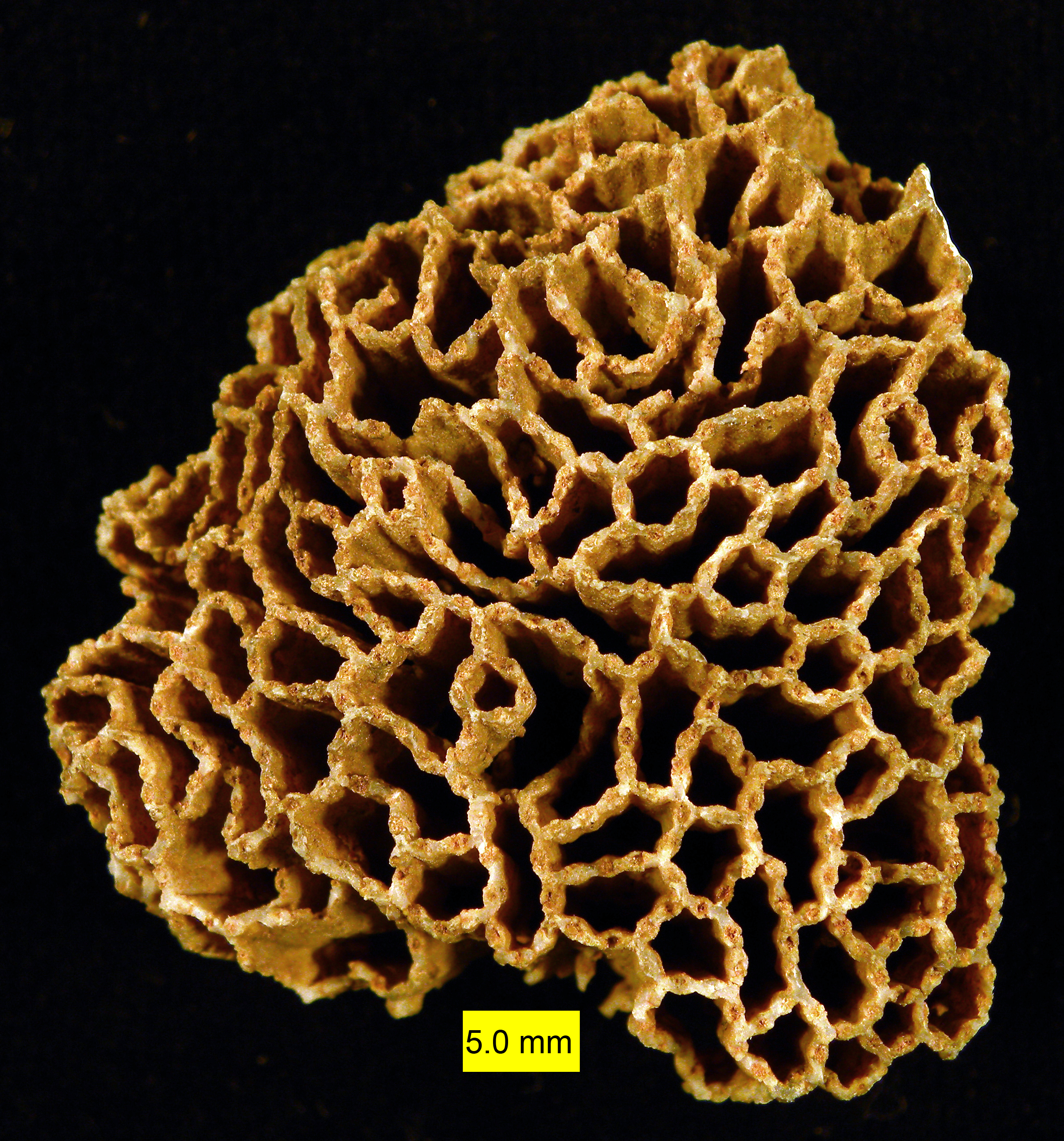
A staged laboratory photograph of Halysites sp., a Silurian tabulate coral, by Mark Wilson

In the laboratory, photography is typically used as a cataloging tool or a means of illustrating objects on a small to microscopic scale, such as individual fossils, grains, or microstructures. Equipment is often similar, perhaps with the addition of a macro lens and/or a tripod or otherwise stabilized camera mounting system. Small studio-like areas with neutral backgrounds and artificial lighting are often used to emphasize minute structures and details. Material coatings, such as water, alcohol, or ammonium chloride, are also often selectively applied to bring out certain aspects or features of the object being photographed. At even smaller scales, a range of analytical techniques, including microscopy, scanning electron microscopy (SEM), and X-ray, UV, and IR photography can be used to accomplish the goals of geophotography.

=== Remote sensing ===
Perhaps the most rapidly expanding application of geophotography is remote sensing, which encompasses both aerial and satellite imaging. In addition to photography, on-board sensors carried by these systems perform a number of different types of analyses, ranging from visual analysis to digital elevation data gathering. Remote sensing imagery is applied extensively in geology for a multitude of purposes. High-resolution Light Detection and Ranging (LiDAR; also known as Airborne Laser Scanning) data is used to construct digital elevation models of terrain to understand and track change and effects of rivers, glaciers, ice caps, oceans, volcanoes, and more. Data from other topography missions has yielded substantial results in the holistic and synoptic geologic understanding of the processes, such as natural hazards, at work on Earth (e.g. SRTM, ASTER GDEM) and on other planets such as Mars (e.g. MOLA). Modern high-resolution sensors even allow remote viewing and analysis of fine stratigraphy on other planets.

== Geophotography as an educational tool ==
Geophotography features heavily in publicity because of its inherent ability to communicate a point or goal while avoiding technical jargon. Photography as a medium is also presentable in many more venues and much more widely accessible than text formats. Thus geophotography is an important tool in formal academic settings, public museums, and especially in issue-based forums. The conservation movement, championed by national and state park systems as well as organizations such as the Sierra Club and the Appalachian Mountain Club, has used geophotography as an especially effective outreach tool. Databases, such as Google's Historical Imagery project, Vermont's Landscape Change Program, or Ohio's GIS-Based Photographic Archive, are particularly capable of displaying visual evidence of trends over various time scales and are thus highlighted extensively in arenas of historical interest and public debate.
