= List of Slovenian photographers =

A list of notable photographers from Slovenia:

== B ==
- Boštjan Burger

== K ==
- Gojmir Anton Kos

== L ==
- Matevž Lenarčič
- Marijan Lipovšek

== M ==
- Julie Martini
- Marko Modic

== P ==
- Justina Hermina Pacek
- Veno Pilon
- Ernest Pogorelc
- Marko Prezelj
- Janez Avguštin Puhar
- Benka Pulko

== R ==
- Janko Ravnik
