= Lead room =

Compositional concept in visual arts

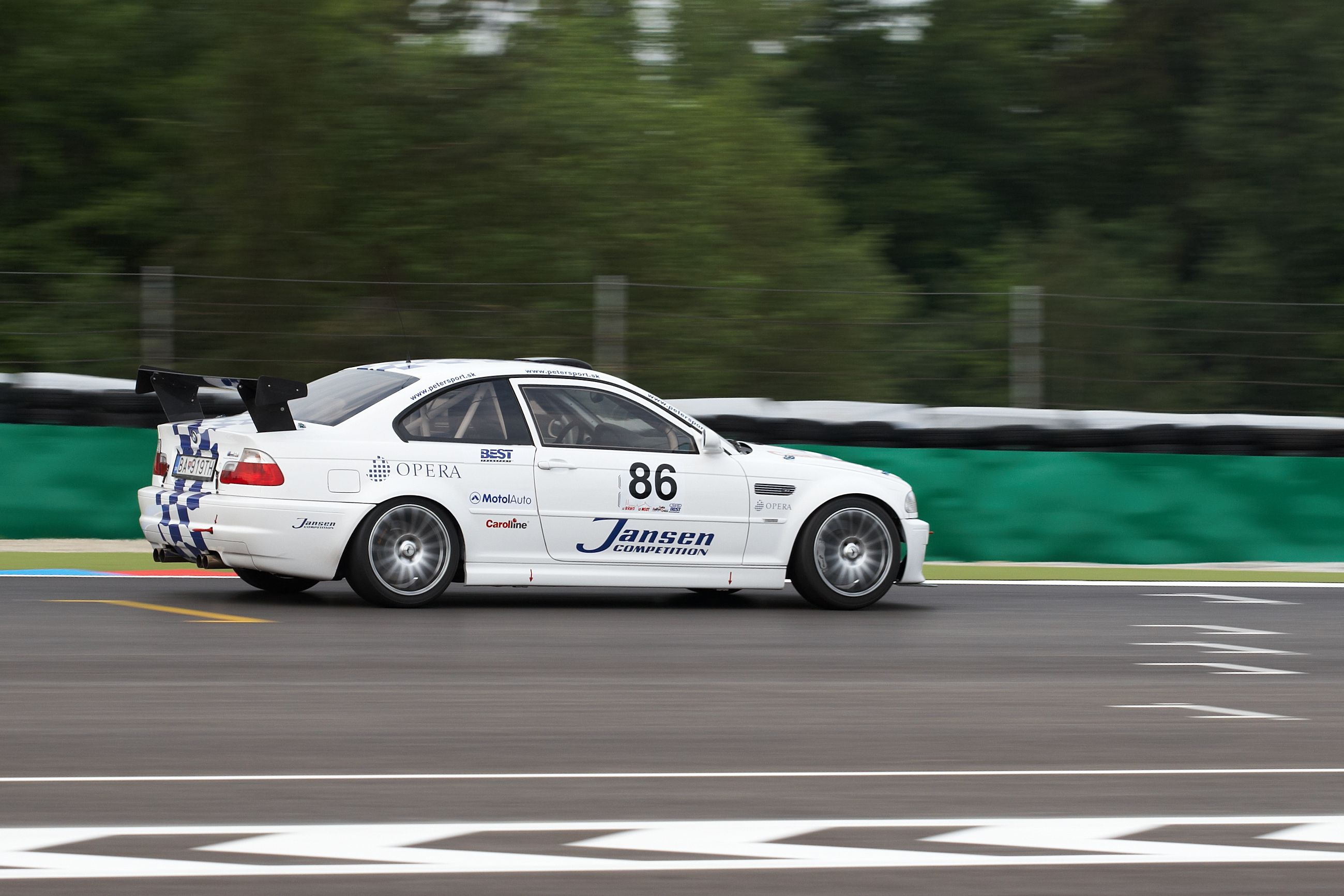
Image of a racing car with lead room

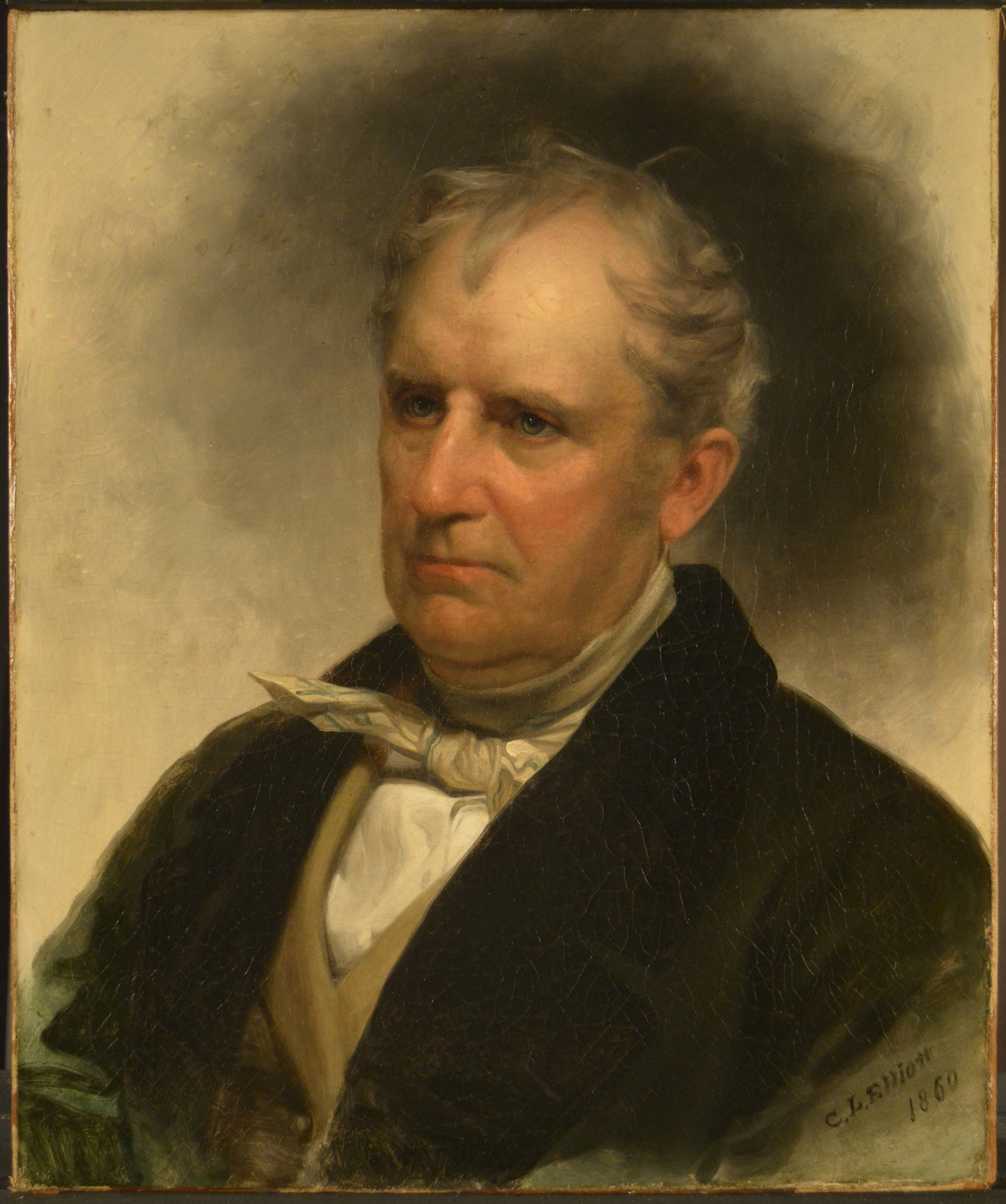
A portrait painting with more empty space on the side that the sitter is facing

In photography, filmography and other visual arts, lead room, or sometimes nose room, is the space in front, and in the direction of, moving or stationary subjects. Well-composed shots leave space in the direction the subject is facing or moving. When the human eye scans a photograph for the first time it will expect to see a bit in front of the subject.

For example, moving objects such as cars require lead room. If extra space is allowed in front of a moving car, the viewer can see that it has somewhere to go; without this visual padding, the car's progress will seem impeded.

== See also ==
- Headroom (photographic framing)
- Rule of thirds
