= Harris shutter =

Photographic equipment

The Harris shutter is a device attached to a camera to create three nearly-identical exposures, with three color filters, each exposed in succession. The device, and its consequent effect, was invented by Robert S. Harris of Kodak. The term Harris shutter is also applied to the technique or effect. In practice, this effect is an application of the three-color principle used in photography since the mid-19th century.

The effect is produced by re-exposing the same frame of film through red, green and blue filters in turn, while keeping the camera steady. This will generate a rainbow of colour around any object that moves within the frame. Some good candidates for subjects include waterfalls (pictured, left), clouds blowing over a landscape or people walking across a busy town square.

Traditionally, the technique is either achieved using a camera that allows in-register multiple exposures, and changing filters on the front of the lens. Another alternative was to make a drop through filter that consisted of the three coloured gels and two opaque sections that is literally dropped through a filter holder during exposure.

With the advent of digital photography, the process has become much simpler – the photographer can simply take three colour photographs on location, and then use software to take the Red channel from one exposure, combine with the blue and green channels from the other two photos to good effect – this may even allow for correction of movement if the camera is inadvertently moved between exposures. Another advantage of digital processing is that different results can be obtained by reassigning the RGB channel of each layer.

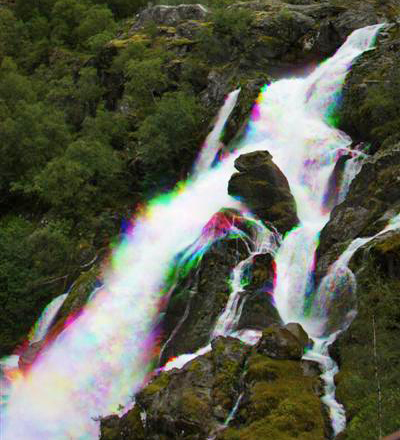
Rushing water captured with Harris shutter

Waterfall demonstrating the Harris shutter technique

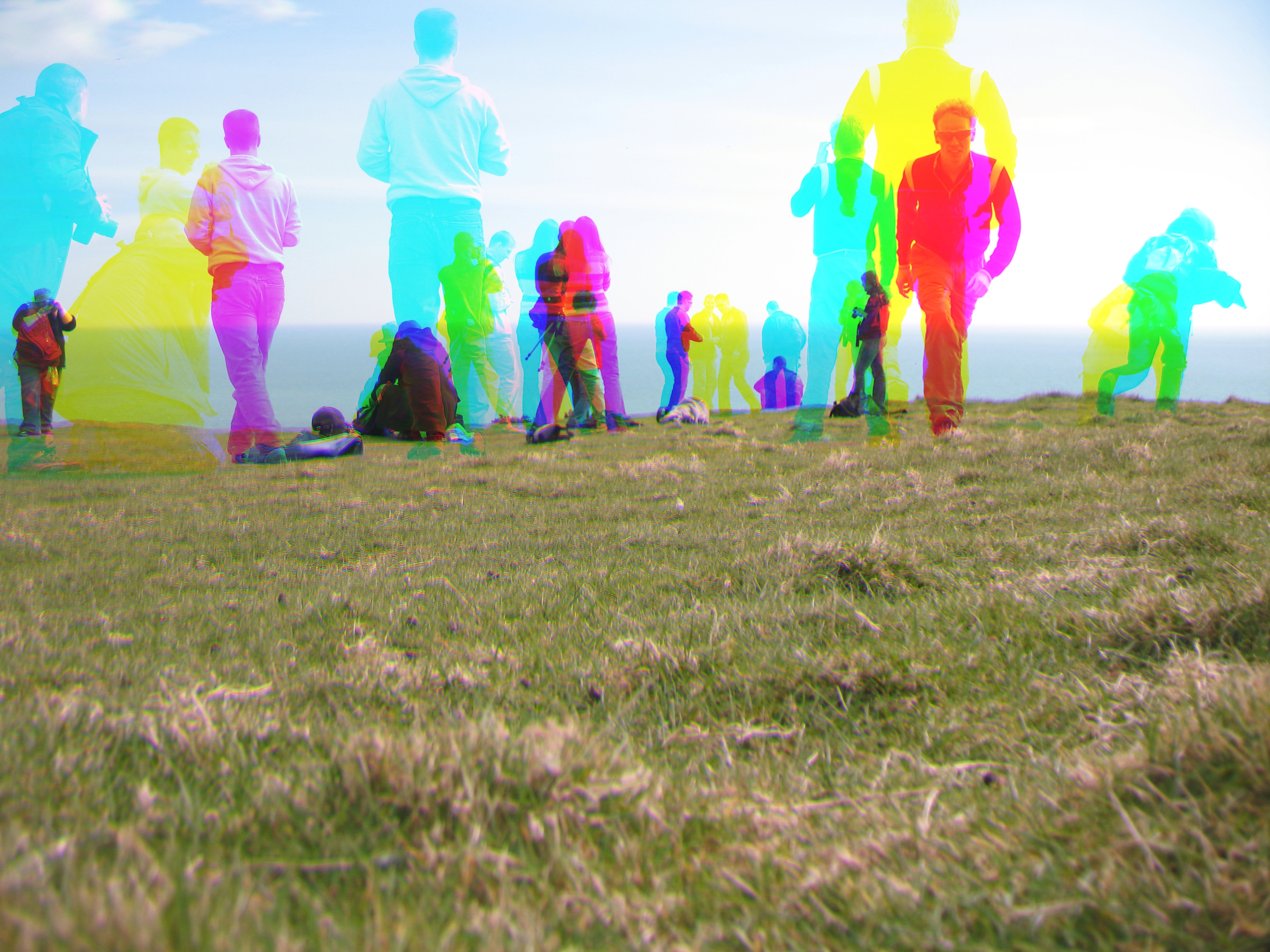
Example with large scale movement of elements (produced from 3 digital colour images)

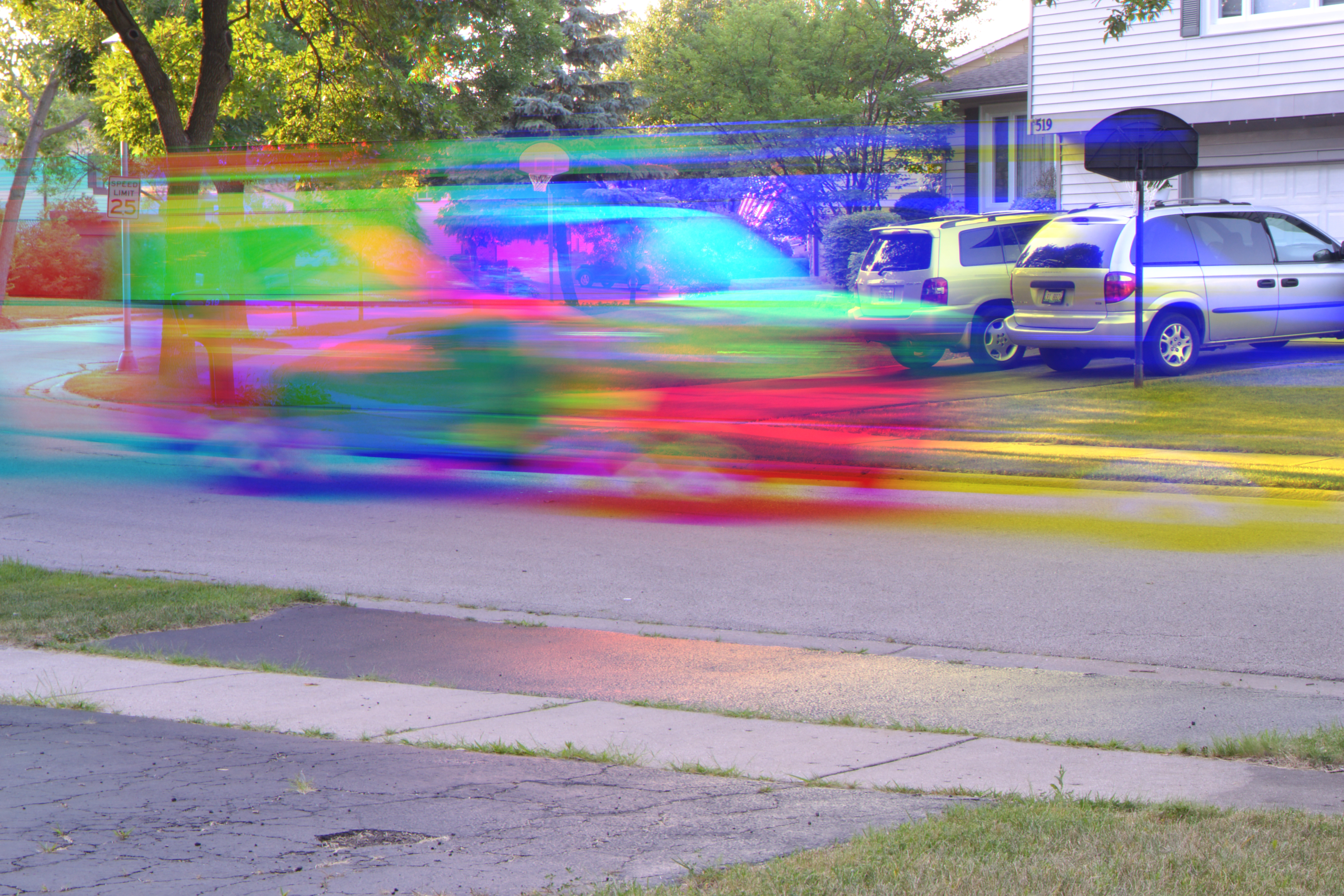
Example using a driving truck
