= Through the Viewfinder photography =

Photography technique using two cameras

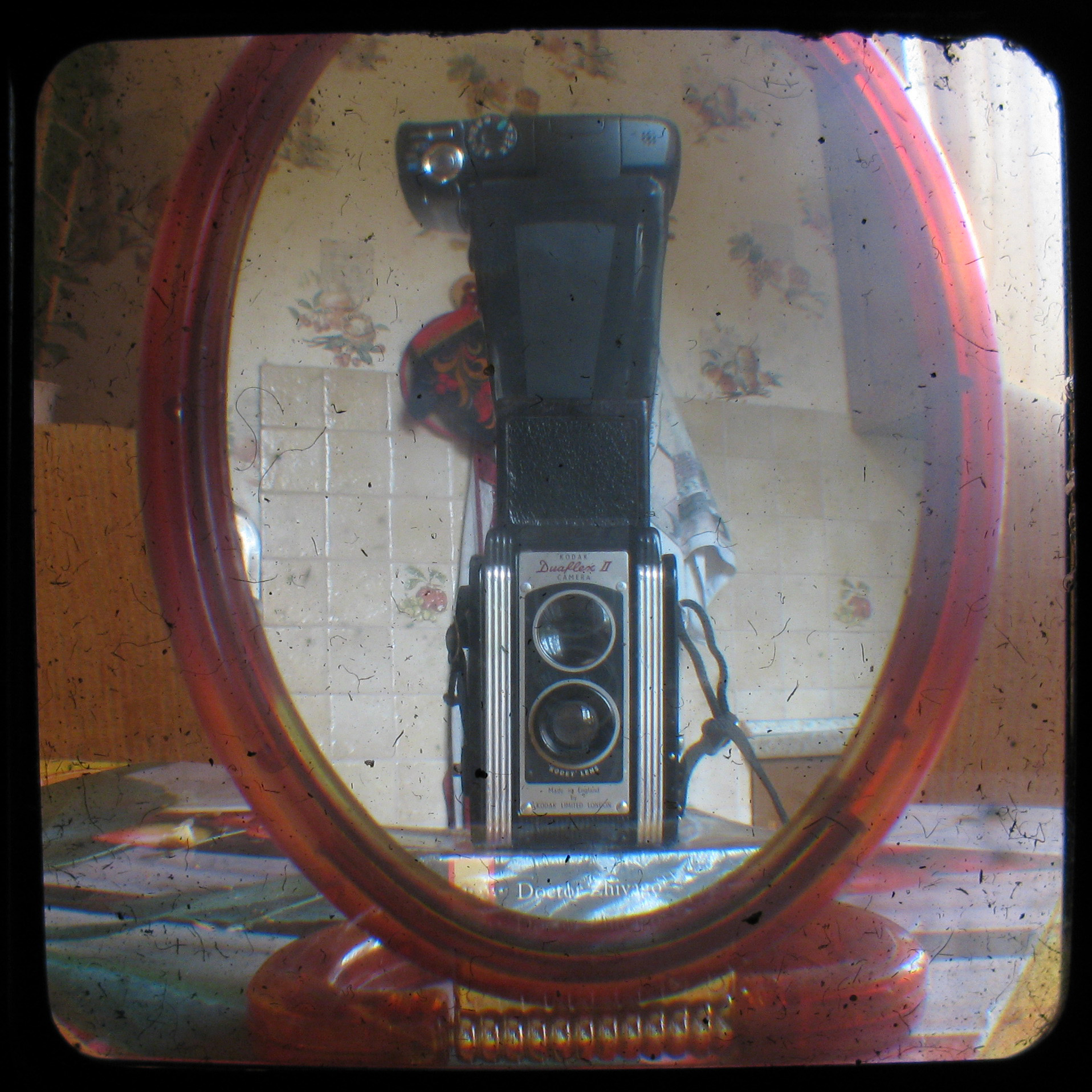
Set-up for through the viewfinder photography. The photograph is taken by a digital camera, top, through the viewfinder of a Kodak Duaflex box camera. The two cameras are linked by a cardboard tube to block out extraneous light and avoid reflections from the Duaflex glass.

Through the Viewfinder (TtV) photography is a photographic or videographic technique in which a photograph or video or motion picture film is shot with one camera through the viewfinder of a second camera. The viewfinder thus acts as a kind of lens filter. The most popular method involves using a digital camera as the image taking camera and an intact twin-lens reflex camera (TLR) or pseudo-TLR as the "viewfinder" camera. TLRs typically have square waist-level viewfinders, with the viewfinder plane at 90 degrees to the image plane. The image in a TLR viewfinder is laterally reversed, i.e. it is a mirror image. Most photographers use a cardboard tube or other apparatus connecting the two cameras in order to eliminate stray light and prevent reflections from appearing on the viewfinder glass or on the lens of the imaging camera.

Depending on the model of TLR, the resulting image may have an old-fashioned feel to it, often with vignetting, blurred edges, distortion and dust. TLR models popular among TtV photographers have a brilliant type ('bubble glass') viewfinder. They include the Ansco Anscoflex, Argus 75, Kodak Duaflex and Kodak Brownie.

== History ==
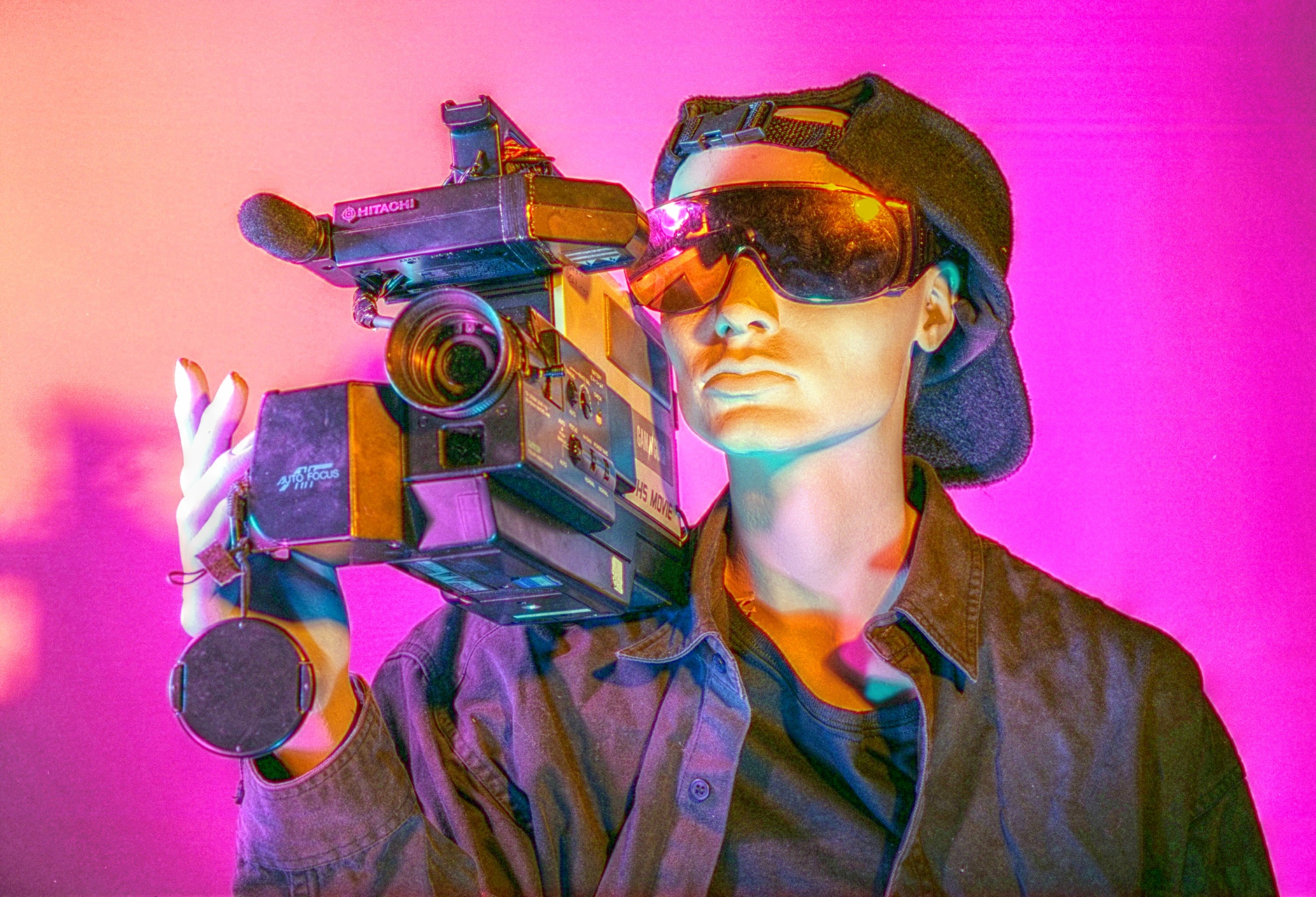
Public exhibit on through the viewfinder videography, by S. Mann, LVAC (List Visual Arts Center), October 1997. The video is taken by EyeTap Generation-2 Glass (shown here worn by the mannequin) through the viewfinder of a hand-held video camera. The wearer of the EyeTap records what is seen while looking into the eyecup of the hand-held camera, resulting in what Mann refers to as a "Meta Documentary" (a documentary about making a documentary).

While waist-level viewfinders have been common in box cameras since the beginning of the 20th century, large viewfinders of the sort that are suitable for TtV photography became popular in the late 1920s and 1930s with medium format TLR and pseudo TLR cameras such as the Rolleiflex and the Voigtländer Brillant. Similar large, clear square viewfinders were popular in TLRs and pseudo TLRs until the mid-1960s. These medium format cameras became less popular with the advent of 35mm SLRs and compact cameras in the 1960s and 1970s.

The idea of photographing an image through the viewfinder of such a camera is relatively new, and TtV photography and filmography has come into use with the advent of digital cameras and EyeTap devices. Before the advent of digital photography it was necessary to use extension tubes to photograph a close-up object such as a viewfinder, and it was difficult to judge focusing precisely. Both compact digital cameras and digital SLRs are able to focus on close objects without the need for extension tubes, and their autofocus function and digital viewing screen make it easy to focus and judge framing and exposure. Moreover, the EyeTap device captures exactly what the eye sees, and therefore can capture video recordings of anything that the human eye can look into. It is thus much better suited to this type of photography/videography than most previously known cameras.

U.S. Patent 6614408 (S. Mann, 1999), entitled "Eye-tap for electronic newsgathering, documentary video, photojournalism, and personal safety", describes this method of using 2 cameras, the first of which is a wearable camera, and the second camera is handheld, so as to record the experience of one camera looking through a second camera:

This embodiment..., when manufactured in a wearable form (e.g. covertly concealed in eyeglasses) may be used for meta documentary, such as when shooting a documentary about shooting a documentary. In metadocumentary, the wearer of the glasses carries an ordinary camcorder and records the experience of looking through the viewfinder of the camcorder. In this way the wearer, in effect... a viewfinder for the viewfinder of the camcorder. Thus the wearer can capture a true and accurate depiction of what it is like to walk around with a camcorder, so that those viewing the documentary are, in effect, taken inside the eyecup of the camcorder viewfinder so they can vicariously experience the making of a documentary. The camcorder need not actually record, but may in fact be nothing more than a prop.

(emphasis added)

In addition, the popularity of digital photography and of on-line auction sites has led to a big increase in the number of older medium format TLRs and pseudo TLRs on the second hand market. Many people find it more convenient to use these cameras for TtV photography than to use them with film.

== TtV video ==
Videos shot using TtV are known as "Meta Documentaries", an example of which was ShootingBack, by S. Mann, in which a covert EyeTap wearable camera was used to shoot through the viewfinder of various standard hand-held video and motion picture film cameras. In some situations both of the two cameras record, and the resulting "Meta Documentary" is edited down from both camera feeds (the camera being looked into, as well as the camera that's looking into its viewfinder). In other cases, the second camera is just a "dummy" camera that does not actually record, and its purpose is only to be looked through.

== Equipment and practicalities ==
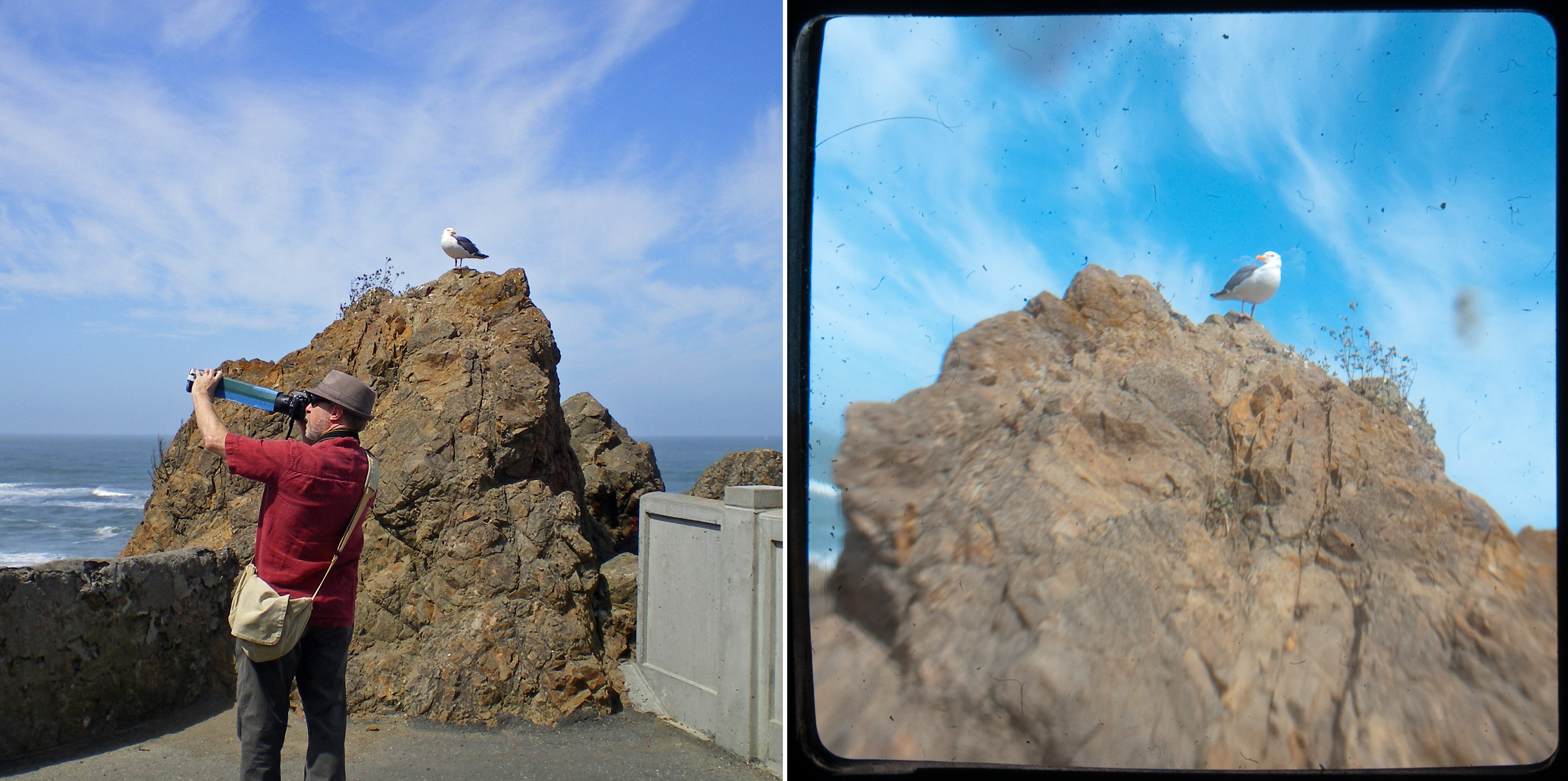
A photographer demonstrating the TtV technique (left); resultant photograph (right). Note mirrored image and post processing color adjustments in the TtV photo. Shot with a Nikon D90 through a Kodak Brownie Relfex Synchro.

The following equipment is required:

1. A "bottom camera" through the viewfinder of which the photograph will be taken. Typically this is a medium format TLR or pseudo TLR.
2. A "top camera" which will be used to take the photograph. Typically this is a digital SLR or digital compact camera with a macro lens or macro function.
3. A "contraption" to link the two cameras and block out any excess light.

The contraption may be a simple cardboard tube, or an open ended box that fits around the bottom camera.

== Post-processing ==
Post-processing can be done with image editing software. This normally involves cropping the image to a square and straightening it. The cropping is necessary because in most cases the (normally square) viewfinder image covers only about 25- 50% of the area of the (normally rectangular) digital picture.

Additionally some photographers prefer to 'flip' the TtV image so that it is no longer a mirror image, especially if the image contains lettering.

Color and saturation adjustments depend on the taste of the photographer, some photographers prefer to keep such adjustments to a minimum while others prefer more radical adjustments, such as the "Urban Acid" action for the image editing programs Adobe Photoshop or GIMP.

== See also ==
- Afocal photography
