= Headroom (photographic framing) =

Aesthetic composition term

In photography and cinematography, headroom or head room is a concept of aesthetic composition that addresses the relative vertical position of the subject within the frame of the image. Headroom refers specifically to the distance between the top of the subject's head and the top of the frame, but the term is sometimes used instead of lead room, nose room or 'looking room' to include the sense of space on both sides of the image. The amount of headroom that is considered aesthetically pleasing is a dynamic quantity; it changes relative to how much of the frame is filled by the subject. Rather than pointing and shooting, one must compose the image to be pleasing. Too much room between a subject's head and the top of frame results in dead space.

== Origins of headroom ==
Typical headroom framing in Leonardo da Vinci's Mona Lisa or La Gioconda, 1503–1505/1507

The concept of headroom was born with portrait painting techniques. Classical painters used a technique linked to headroom called the "rule of thirds". The "rule of thirds" was coined by the painter John Thomas Smith in his book "Remarks on Rural Scenery." The rule of thirds suggests that the subject's eyes, as a centre of interest, are ideally positioned one-third of the way down from the top of the frame. With a subject placed one-third of the way down from the top of the frame, the subject aligns with the proper headroom to make an image pleasing to the eye. This technique has carried on with other visual forms of art such as photography and cinematography.

== Psychology of headroom ==
Perceptual psychological studies have been carried out with experimenters using a white dot placed in various positions within a frame to demonstrate that observers attribute potential motion to a static object within a frame, relative to its position. The unmoving object is described as 'pulling' toward the center or toward an edge or corner. Proper headroom is achieved when the object is no longer seen to be slipping out of the frame—when its potential for motion is seen to be neutral in all directions.

Head room can also aid the creator in imposing a certain feeling upon the viewer. Headroom is a way of balancing out a frame. According to Dr. John Suhler in his e-book Photographic Psychology: Image and Psyche, “the eye appreciates the appearance of balance in [an image]. It makes us feel centered, steady, and stable. It suggests poise and gracefulness.” Headroom helps create this balance. If there is too much headroom, this can make a viewer feel unsettled. On the other hand, a head that is partially cut off can make a viewer feel claustrophobic. A perfectly framed headroom can make the viewer feel at ease and focus on the eyes of a subject. This allows a filmmaker to advance the story visually by altering a viewer's subconscious. It may also aid a photographer in creating the tone they want in a photograph. For a head shot, they would want the viewer to be completely at ease and be drawn to the person in the shot. They would frame it perfectly. For a piece of art about mental illness, they may give the viewer either too much headroom or too little. It depends on the overall effect a photographer wants.

== Headroom in cinematography ==
Cinematography has the added factors of the movement of the subject, the movement of the camera, and the possibility of zooming in or out.

Headroom changes as the camera zooms in or out, and the camera must simultaneously tilt up or down to keep the center of interest approximately one-third of the way down from the top of the frame. The closer the subject, the less headroom needed. In extreme close-ups, the top of the head is out of the frame, but the concept of headroom still applies via the rule of thirds. This also changes when one is shooting an extreme wide-shot. The subject can still be placed correctly for rule of thirds, but have a significant amount of space between his/her head and the top from frame. It can be more visually pleasing to give equal weight to the sky and ground rather than ensuring proper headroom is being achieved.

== Headroom in television ==
In television broadcast camera work, the amount of headroom seen by the production crew is slightly greater than the amount seen by home viewers, whose frames are reduced in area by about 5%. To adjust for this, broadcast camera headroom is slightly expanded so that home viewers will see the correct amount of headroom. Professional video camera viewfinders and professional video monitors often include an overscan setting to compare between full screen resolution and "domestic cut-off" as an aid to achieving good headroom and lead room.

== Examples ==
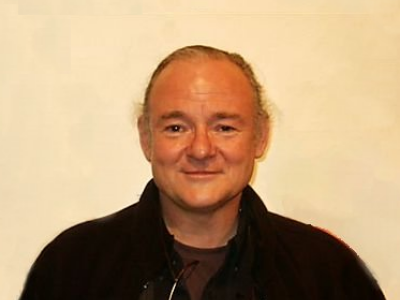
A portrait of guitarist Adrian Legg demonstrates an excessive amount of headroom, with the subject's nose centered in the frame (a common mistake.)

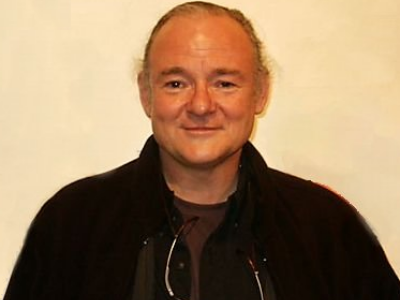
A subtle lack of headroom with the subject's eyes only 28% of the way down from the top, not 33%

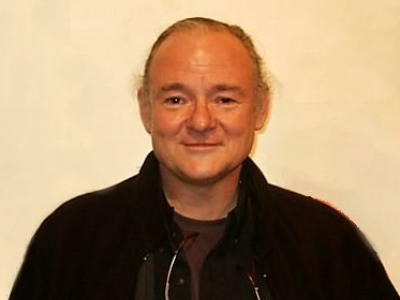
Good composition, with the subject's eyes one-third of the distance down from the top of the frame, following the rule of thirds

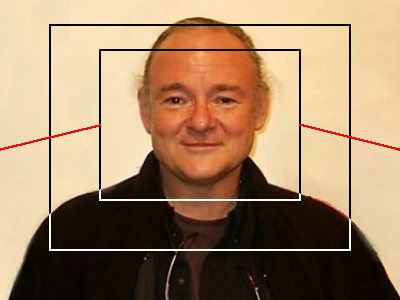
For moving images, the action of zooming in to fill the frame with the subject requires the simultaneous tilting up of the camera, shown by the red lines, to maintain the correct amount of headroom. Conversely, zooming out requires tilting down.

== See also ==
- Highlight headroom
- Max Headroom
