= Olympus Master =

Olympus digital camera software application

- Developer: Olympus Corporation
- Operating system: Windows 2000, Windows XP, Windows Vista, Mac OS
- Type: Image organizer, raw image processing
- License: Freeware

Olympus Master is a software application that was used with Olympus digital cameras and optical accessories. It could be installed and used on PCs running Windows 2000, Windows XP or (in the case of the Olympus Master 2 software) Windows Vista, and also on Macintosh computers.

== Overview ==
Olympus Master allowed users to transfer, browse, print, share and backup images taken with an Olympus camera, or other pictures found on the computer. The software allowed users to convert and edit ORF-RAW files. Images are downloaded from the camera via a USB cable or by using a card reader, and are then put into a gallery. From there, images can be selected and transferred to a CD or a file to be stored on the computer. It is useful for converting Olympus digital (ORF) files, which many software packages cannot open. Images can also be edited using the program. Rotate, crop and red-eye are some common functions in the editing menu. Images can also be printed directly from the software if the user has a photo printer connected to their computer.

The Olympus Master software provides the ability to upgrade the firmware of the users Olympus digital camera when it is linked to the computer via the USB cable. Olympus compact digital cameras, Olympus digital SLRs (E-System cameras), Olympus Zuiko Digital lenses and Olympus flash units are supported. This method is the only way of updating firmware within Olympus equipment. Many other manufacturers such as Nikon and Canon use a different method, which allows the user to temporarily save a patch file to a memory card. Once the user has placed the memory card into the camera they wish to update, the camera will install the new firmware directly from the memory card. Both methods have their advantages, as well as their disadvantages.

Olympus Master 2, which is an update to the original version, is available free from Olympus via their website. It is included with Olympus cameras since mid-2007, replacing the original version. Since February 2008, the original version of the software has not been able to detect newer digital cameras (such as the E-420 digital SLR). If users of the older version who purchase a new product wish to continue using Olympus software or wish to update the firmware within their new equipment, they must first update from the original Olympus Master to the newer version.
