= Fireworks photography =

Taking photographs of fireworks at night

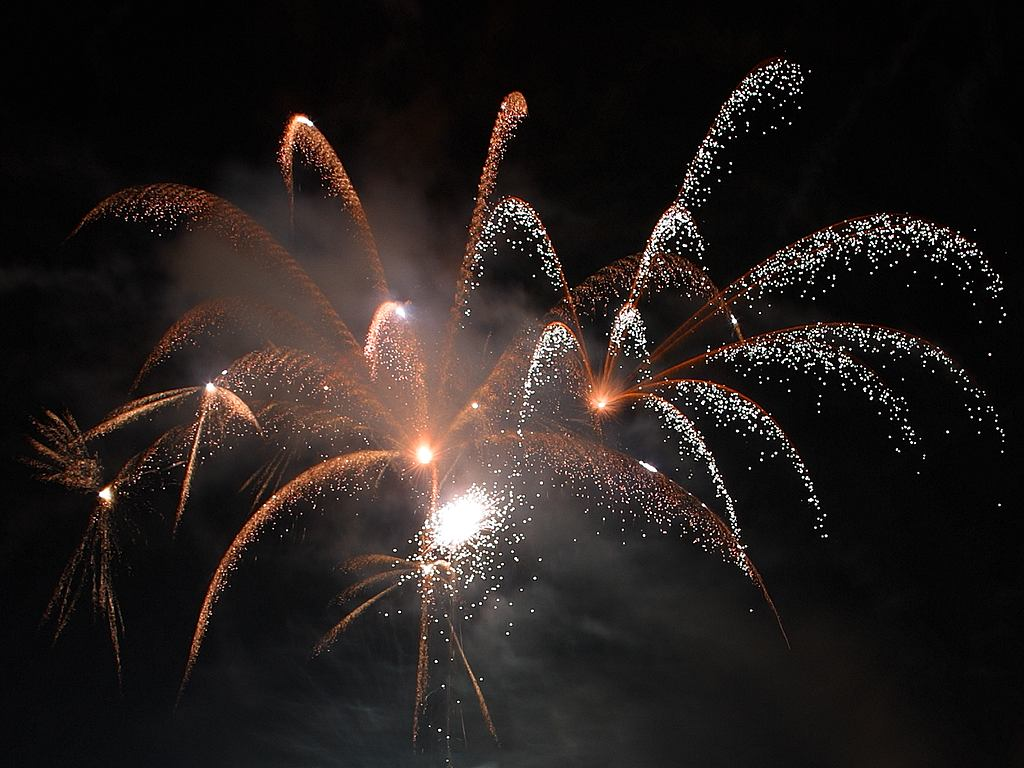
New Years 2002 at Seaport Village

Fireworks photography is the process of taking photographs of fireworks at night. It is a type of night photography, specifically using available light of the fireworks instead of artificial light. Without using the flash on the camera, the photographer often exposes the image for a period of time, known as long exposure. Brighter fireworks sometimes support shorter exposure times.

Exposing the image for long periods of time, requires that the camera is held as steady as possible by the photographer, as slight movements will result in notable camera shake. The most common and effective equipment used to prevent camera shake for long image exposures are a good sturdy tripod along with a remote shutter release (avoiding to have to touch the camera when taking the shot).

Another challenge the photographer faces with exposure timing is having to estimate how long to expose the image in relation to when the firework bursts. Opening the shutter just before the firework bursts and then closing it after its finished would provide the ideal timing for capturing that 'perfect moment'. This can be achieved by setting the camera to 'b' or 'bulb' whereby exposure times are under the direct control of the photographer through the shutter release button.

== Examples ==
The following samples are ordered from longer to shorter exposure time.

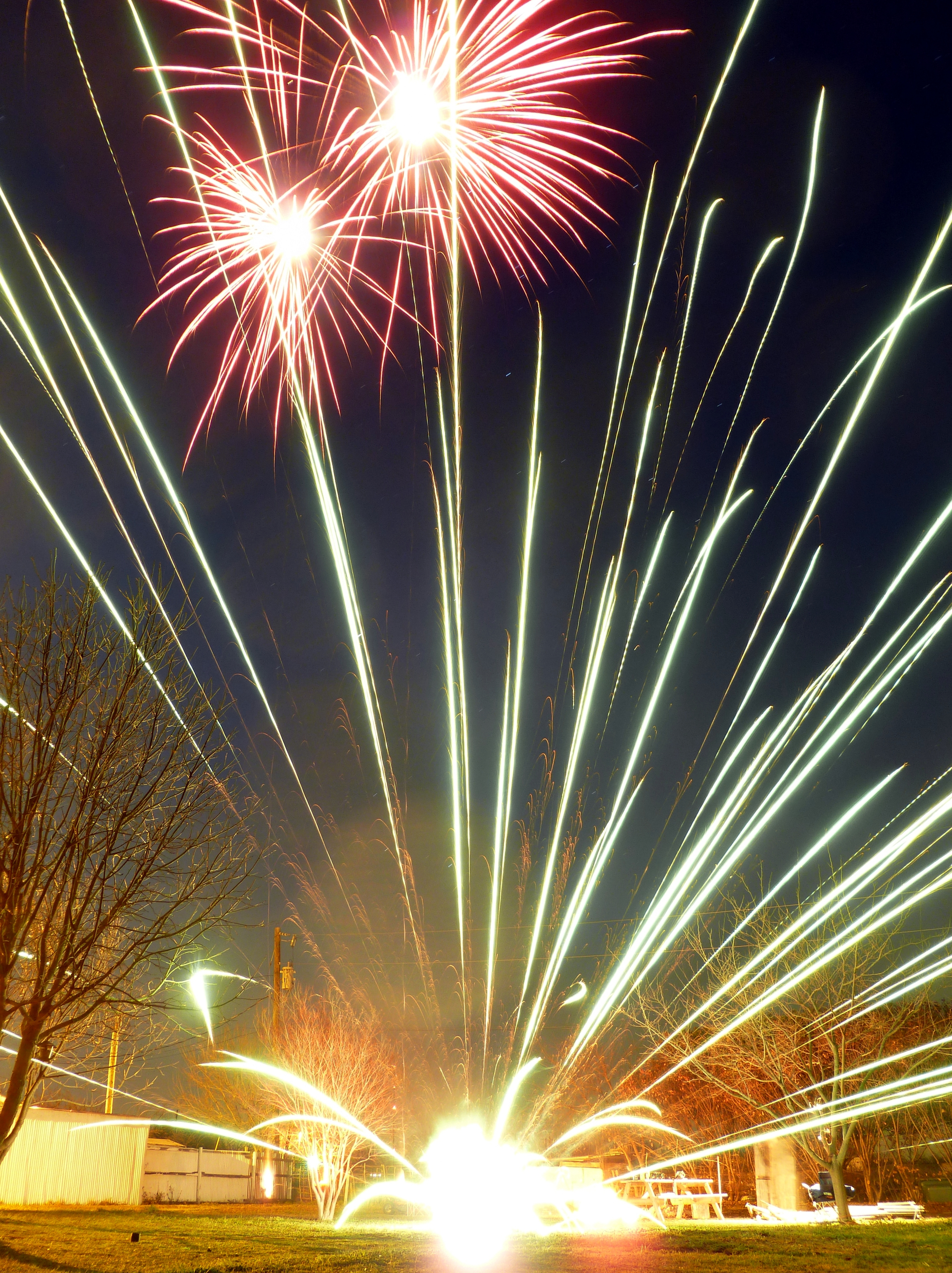
Photo of exploding artillery shell fireworks. Backyard fireworks in Denton, Texas, 60 second exposure

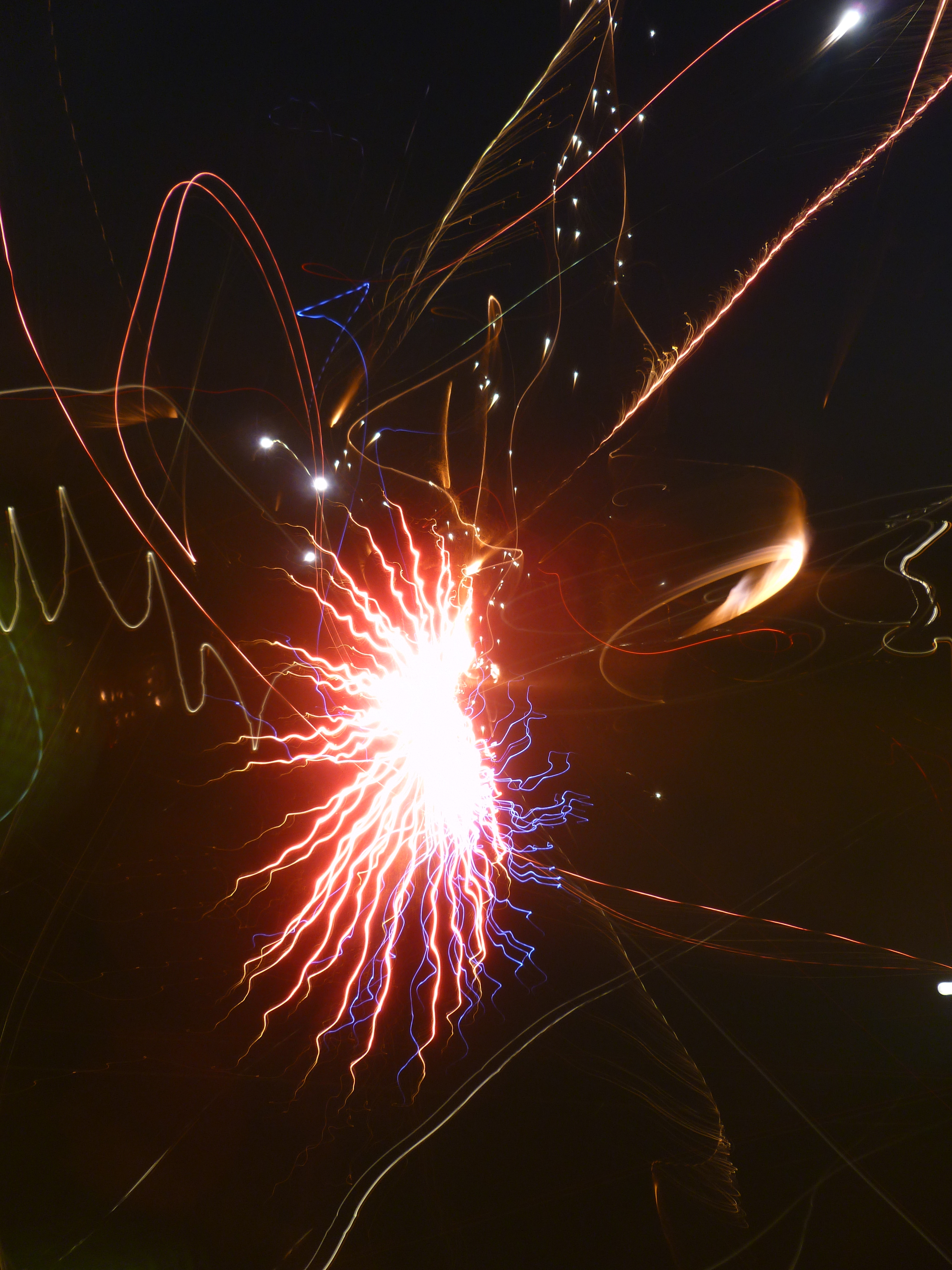
Photo of exploding artillery shell fireworks. 4 July fireworks in Denton, Texas, 60 second exposure

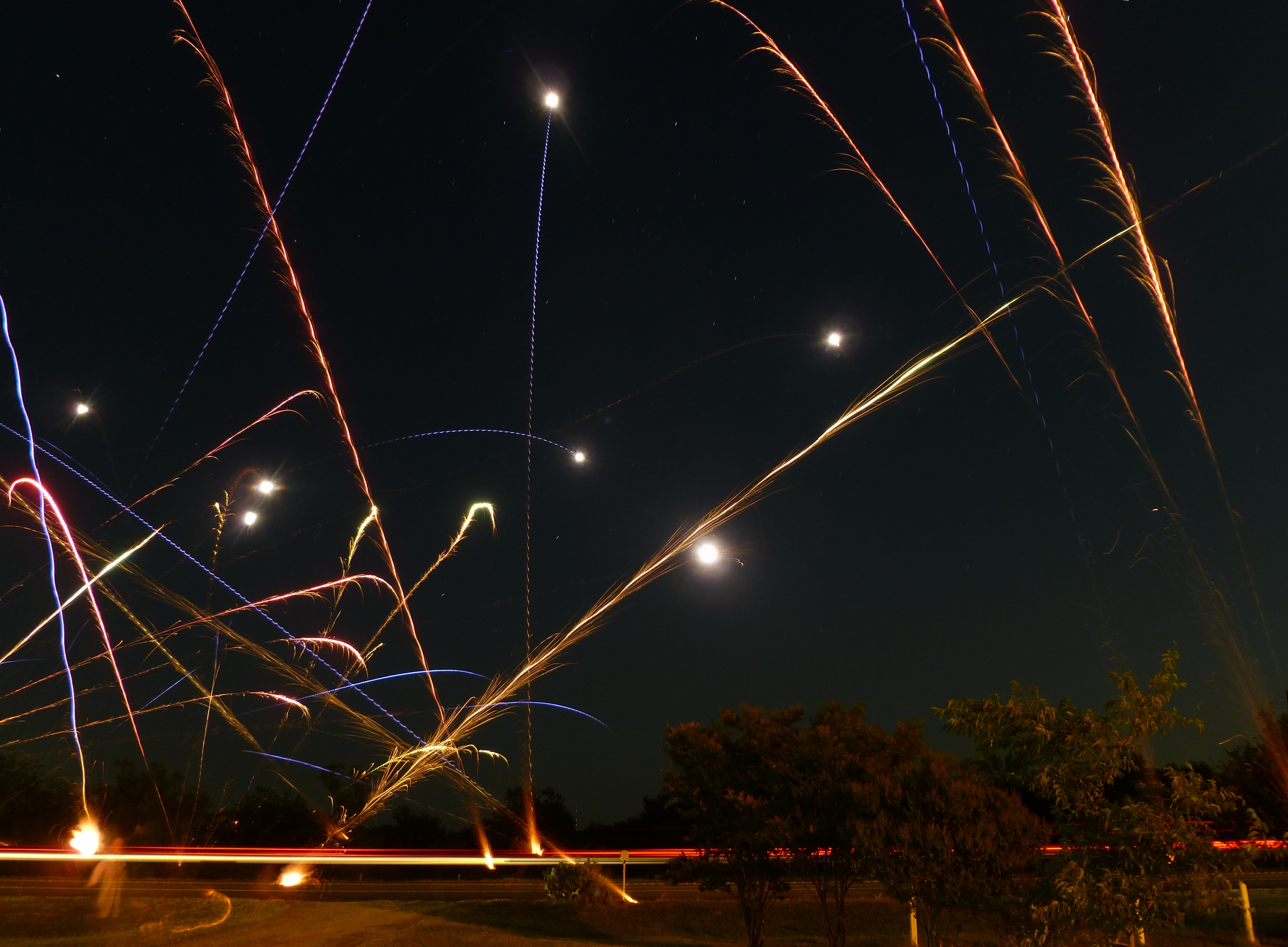
Roman candle with report. 4 July fireworks in Denton, Texas, 60 second exposure

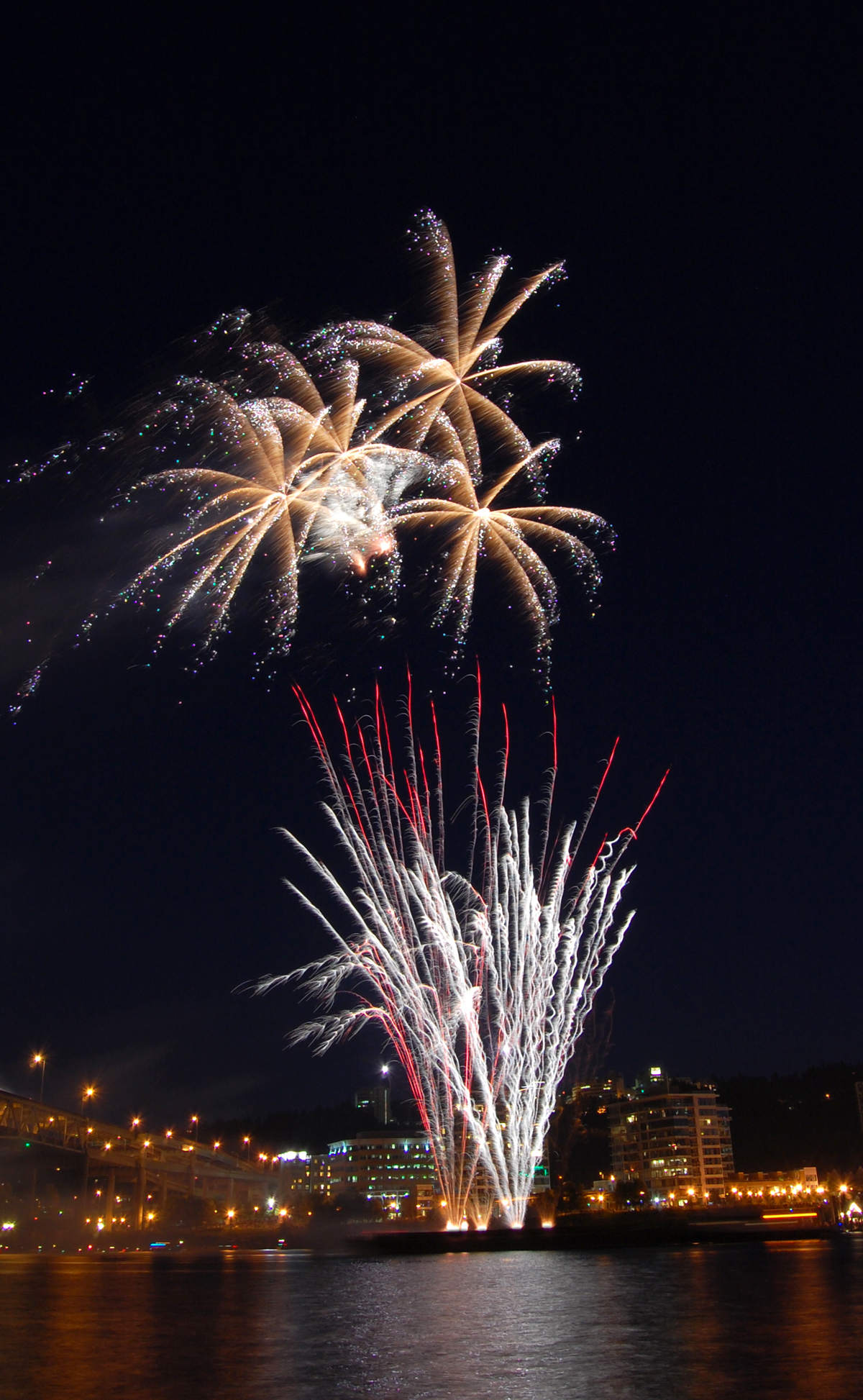
4 July fireworks in Portland, Oregon, 10 second exposure

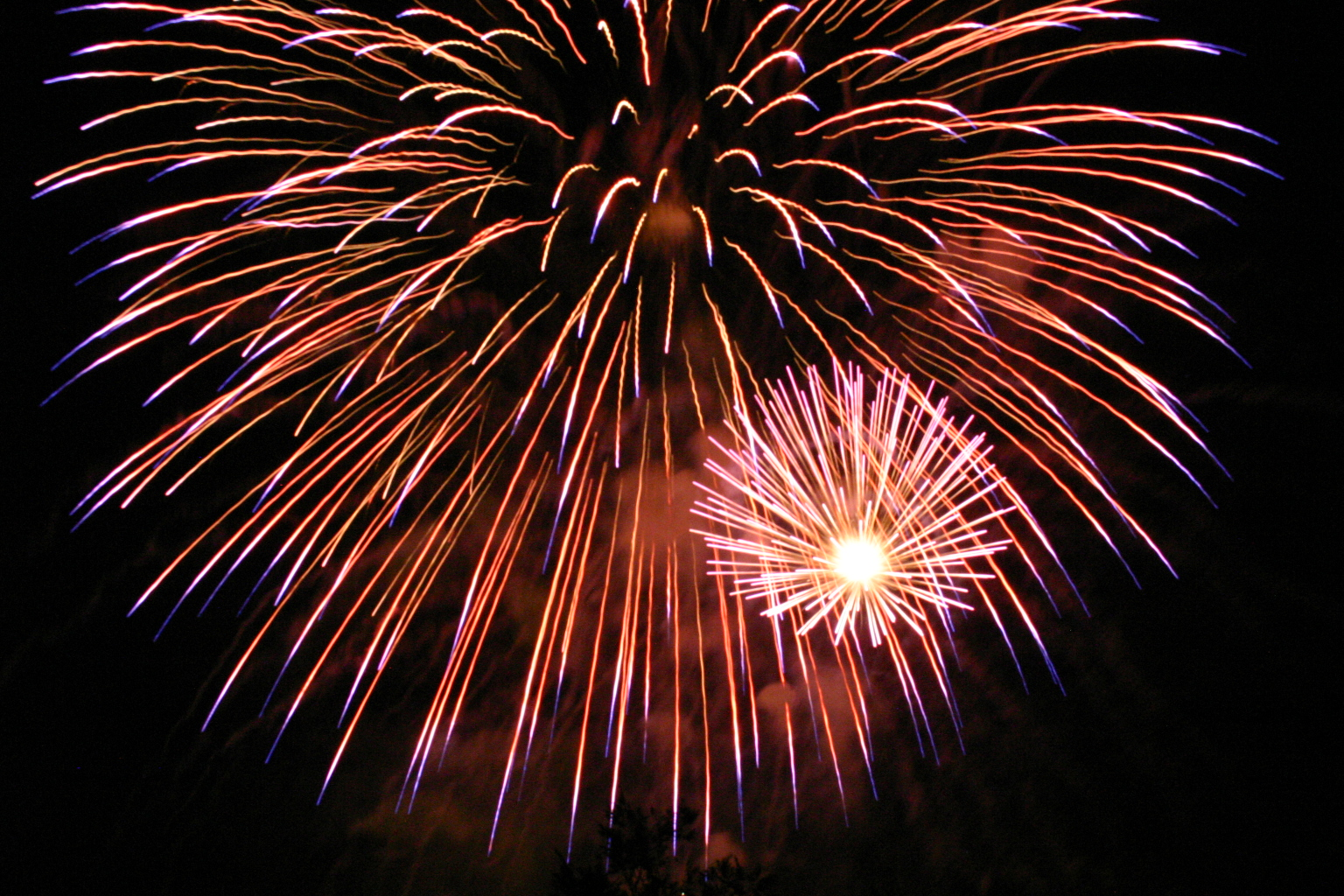
Fourth of July fireworks in San Jose, California, 2 second exposure

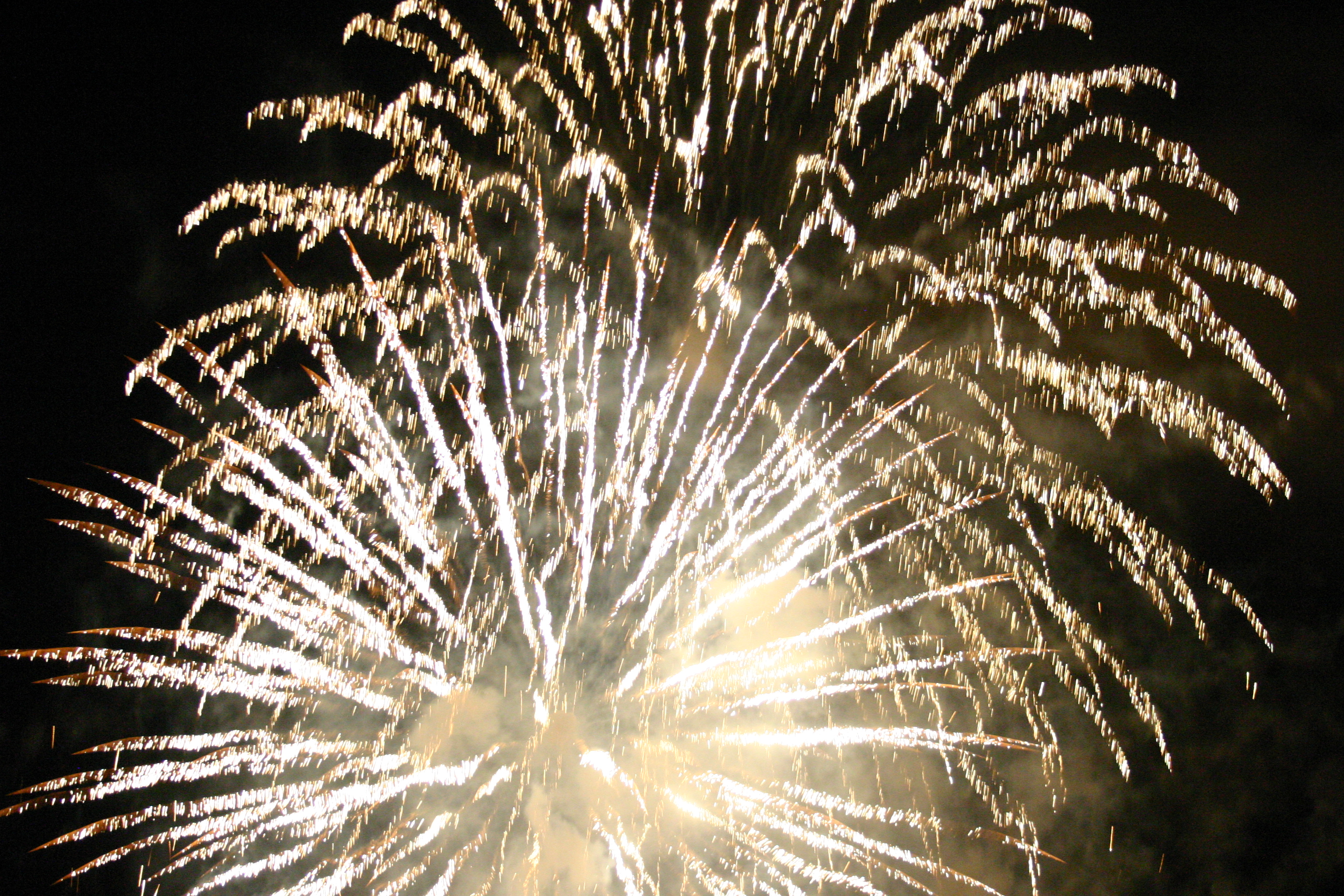
more Fourth of July fireworks from San Jose, 1 second exposure

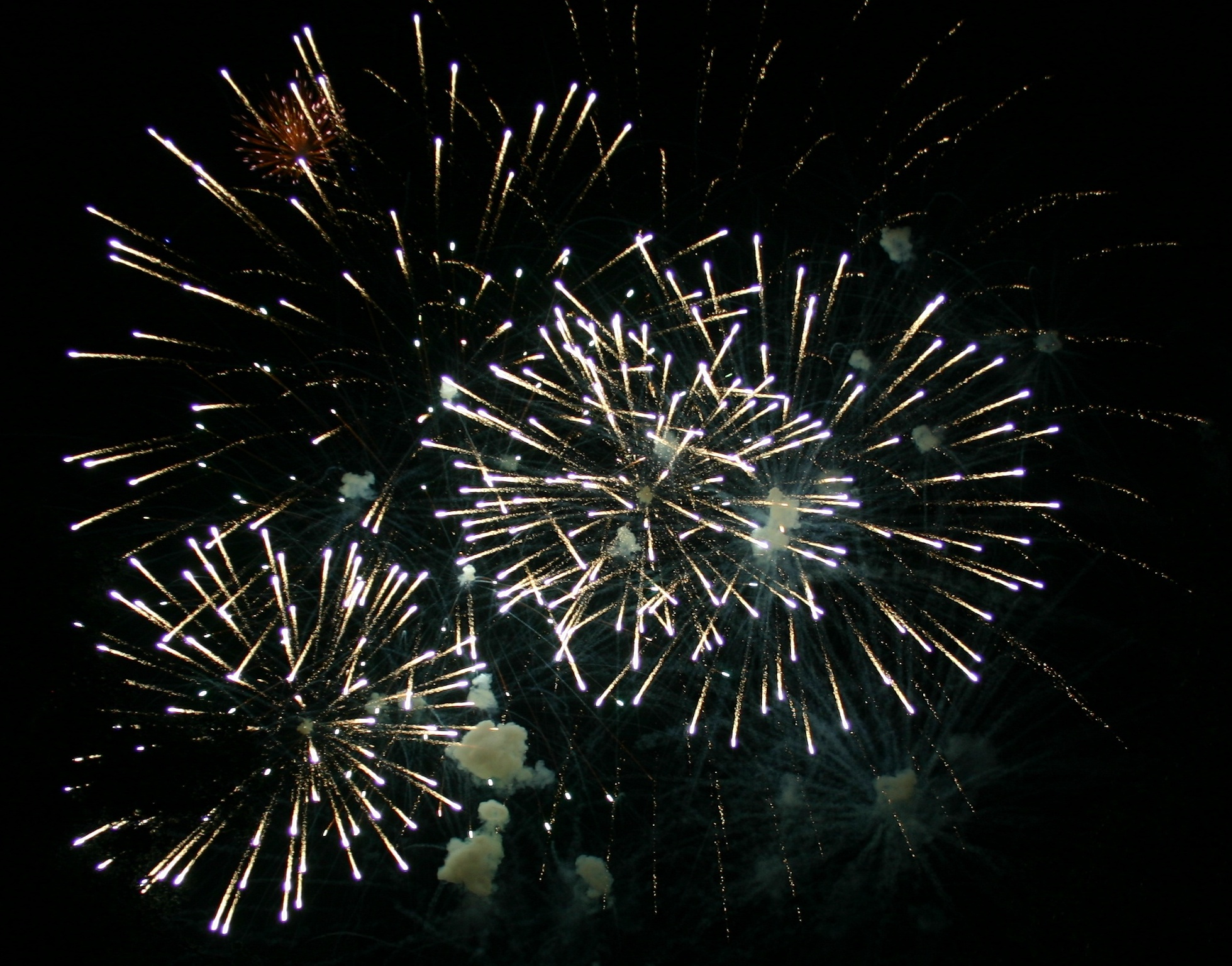
Fireworks in Cameron Park, California, 1/40th second exposure

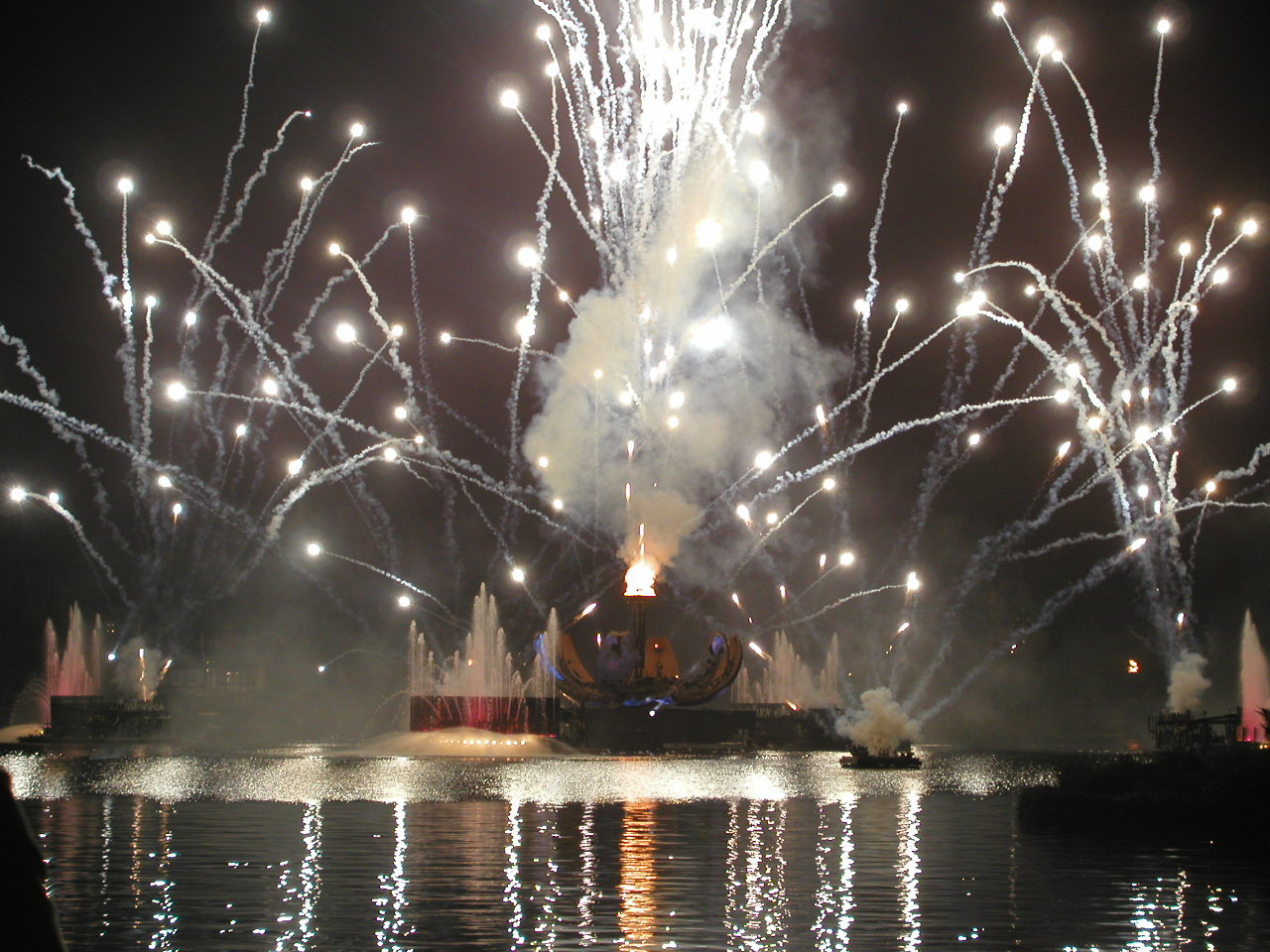
The World Showcase Lagoon at Epcot in Walt Disney World during IllumiNations: Reflections of Earth (the nightly fireworks show), 1/100 second exposure
