= Marko Modic =

Slovenian photographer, painter and visual artist

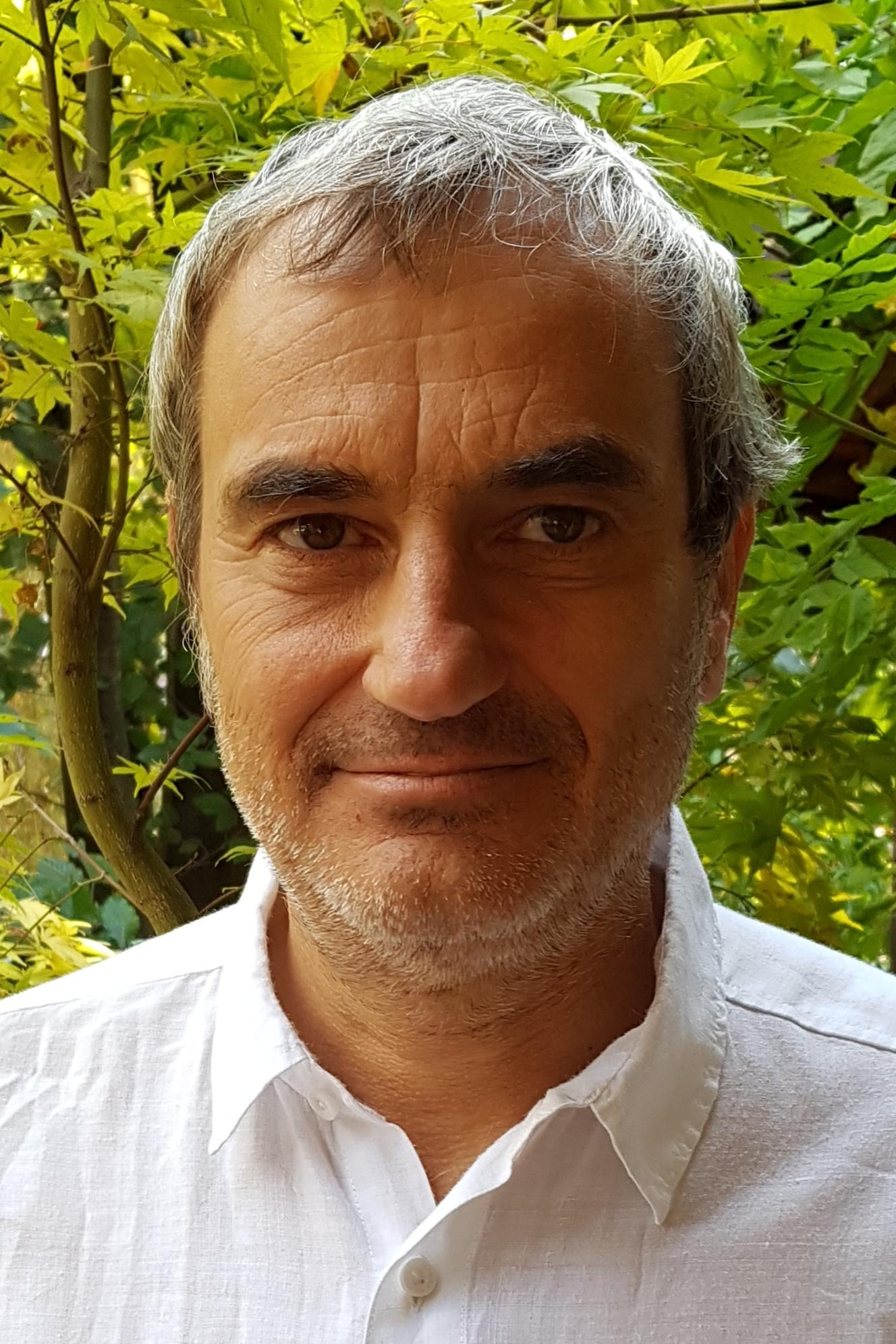
- in Ljubljana, 2019
- Born: 25 August 1958 (age 67); Ljubljana, Slovenia
- Known for: Photography, painting
- Awards: Zlata ptica
- Website: www.markomodic.org

Marko Modic (born 26 August 1958 in Ljubljana) is a Slovenian photographer, painter and visual artist from Ljubljana, Slovenia.

== Biography ==
In 1976 he got his first camera Praktica from his father. At the beginning he worked in black and white photographs and later embarked on a more complex photo-montage that he uses also in his work today. Photograph is used occasionally as a basis on which then he draws a picture. In his work are photographs, paintings, books, as well as performances. Modic's enigmatic photographic works show an extreme sensibility towards perception and use of colors. He captures details of everyday objects or places and uncommonly presents them in insolation, neither in a content nor in perspective-evoking ambiguous interpretation and curiosity...

In 1988 Marko Modic won "Zlata ptica" ["Golden Bird"], a Slovenian award for extraordinary achievements in the fields of cultural creation. Marko Modic has exhibited his photographs widely at home, in Italy, Ecuador, Argentina, UK, Canada... In 2011 he had an exhibition "Written on skin of the Earth" in Tivoli Park in Ljubljana, Slovenia and in Whyte Museum of the Canadian Rockies, Banff, Canada.

At the end of 70's and in the early 80's he was an active member of Ljubljana Cave Exploration Society (DZRJL), took part in high mountain deep cave exploration, was the editor of the society's journal Glas podzemlja [Voice of the Underground] and contributed to design and contents of other caving publications.

Marko Modic lives in Ljubljana, Slovenia (2019).

== Selection of exhibitions and works ==
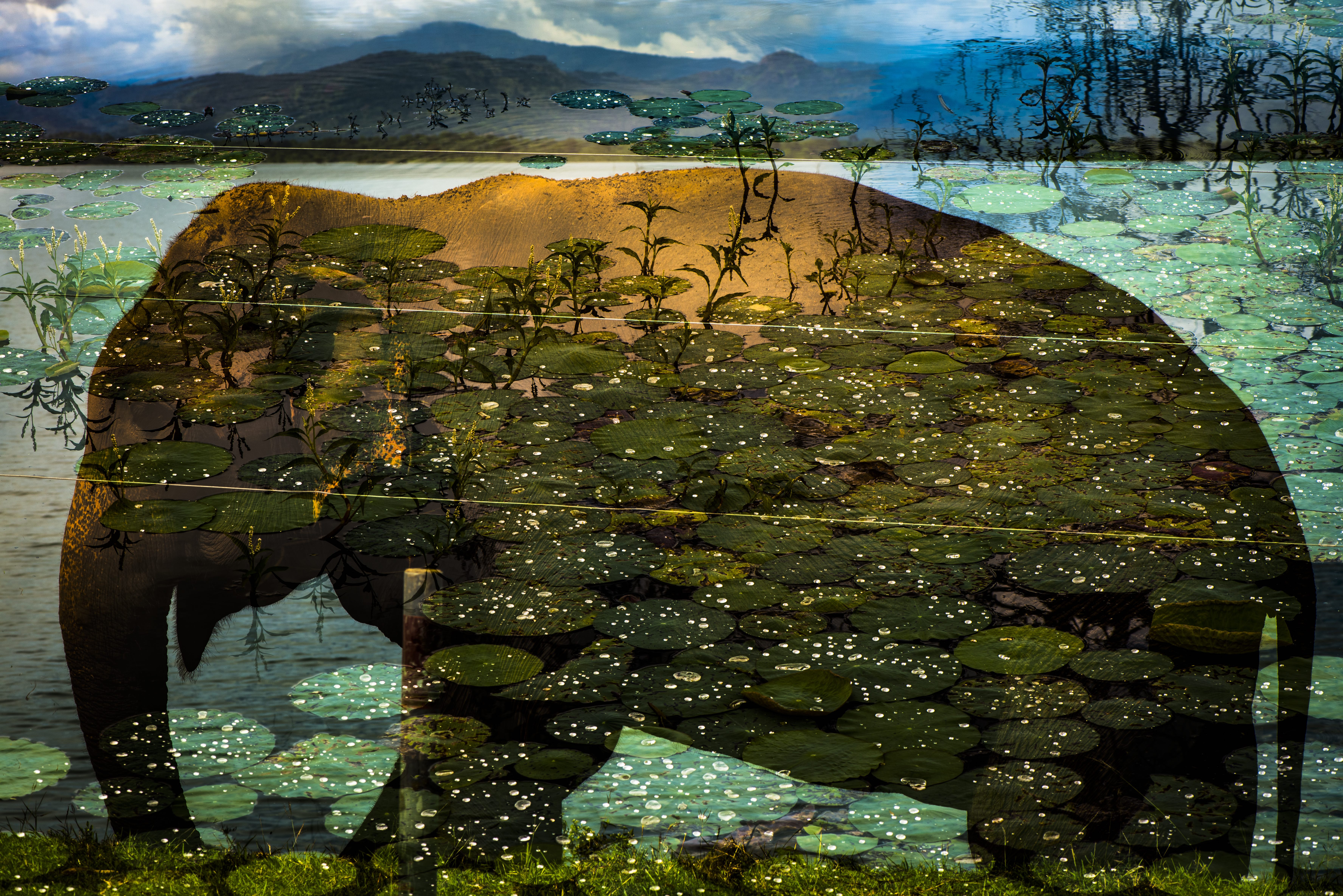
Contraflux Kaiser 2015, Heladotierra project artwork

=== Solo exhibitions ===
- 1984 Cankarjev dom (Cultural and Congress Center), Ljubljana, Slovenia (performance included)
- 1987 Richard Demarco Gallery, Edinburgh, UK
- 1988 Galerija Dante • Marino Cettina, Umag, Croatia
- 1988 Moderna galerija (Museum of Modern Art), Ljubljana, Slovenia
- 1990 Centre Culturel et d’information de Yugoslavie, Paris, France
- 1991 Fundacion Guayasamin, Quito, Ecuador
- 1991 Espace Franco – Americain, Le Mejan, R.l.P., Arles, France
- 1992 Folklore Olga Fisch, Quito, Ecuador
- 1993 Moderna galerija (Museum of Modern Art), Ljubljana, Slovenia
- 1995 Cankarjev dom (Cultural and Congress Center), Ljubljana, Slovenia
- 1996 Teatro San Martin, Buenos Aires, Argentina
- 1996 Barbican Centre, London, UK
- 1998 Ikona Photo gallery, Venezia, Italy
- 1998 Mestna galerija, Ljubljana, Slovenia
- 1999 Mücsarnok, Palace of Art, Budapest, Hungary
- 1999 Palisady gallery, Bratislava, Slovakia
- 1999 Milano Libri, Milano, Italy
- 2002 Galerie Perpétuel, Frankfurt, Germany
- 2004 Equrna Gallery, Ljubljana, Slovenia
- 2004 Euro Center, Ljubljana, Slovenia
- 2004 Galleria Regionale d'Arte Contemporanea Luigi Spazzapan, Gradisca d'Isonzo, Italy
- 2005 – 2012 The Venetian, Scorze (VE), Italy
- 2010 Kosovelov dom, Sezana, Slovenia
- 2010 Atelje Mikado, Ljubljana, Slovenia
- 2011 Whyte Museum, Banff, Canada
- 2011 Jakopičev drevored Tivoli, Ljubljana, Slovenia
- 2011 Atelje Galerija, Ljubljana, Slovenia
- 2012 Galerija Zala, Ljubljana, Slovenia
- 2012 Slovenian Scientific Institut, Wien, Austria
- 2014 The Art photo gallery, Trieste, Italy
- 2015 Galerija Jakopič, Ljubljana, Slovenia
- 2015 Mladinska knjiga, Ljubljana, Slovenia

=== Group exhibitions ===
- 1986 B’Bienale, Rotonda, Thessaloniki, Greece
- 1988 XV Fotoforumm, Fotografi di Alpe Adria, Auditorium, Spilimbergo, Italy
- 1998 Galaxia, Casa Veneta, Muggia, Italy
- 1989 YU Documenta 89, Olympic Center Skenderija, Sarajevo, Bosnia
- 1989 Alcune espressioni, Villa Simion, Spinea, Italy
- 1989 Utopies 89, Grand Palais: L’Europe des créateurs, Paris, France
- 1990 Soirées Est-Ouest, Musée National d’Art Moderne, Centre G.Pompidou, Paris, France
- 1990 Ca dèbloque à l’est, Espace photographique Contretype, Bruxelles, Belgium
- 1990 Soirées Est – Ouest, Galerie Donguy, Paris, France
- 1991 Identités méditerranéennes, Aix-en-Provence, France
- 1994 Alteridades, Sala Gòtica de I’IEI, Lérida, Spain
- 1995 Out post, Venezia, Italy
- 1999 Dal Dahgerrotipo al Digitale, Galleria Sagittaria, Pordenone, Italy
- 2003 Jubilaeum, Galerie Perpétuel, Frankfurt, Germany
- 2009 Drawing in Slovenia, Mestna galerija (Municipal Gallery) Ljubljana, Slovenia
- 2010 Revolutionary Voices, New York Public Library, New York City
- 2010 Photographs from Marino Cettina Collection, Museum of Modern and Contemporary Art, Rijeka, Croatia
- 2010 Drawing in Slovenia, Museum of Contemporary Art, Zagreb, Croatia
- 2010 Drawing in Slovenia (1940–2009), Maribor Art Gallery, Maribor, Slovenia
- 2010 Drawing in Slovenia (1940–2009), Mestna galerija (Municipal Gallery) Ljubljana, Slovenia
- 2011 ZDSLU Group exhibition, Gallery of »Jožef Stefan« Institute, Ljubljana, Slovenia
- 2011 Between Pictorialism and Abstraction, Velenje Gallery, Velenje, Slovenia
- 2011 Between Pictorialism and Abstraction, Kosova graščina, Jesenice, Slovenia
- 2012 NSK 1984–1992, Chelsea Space, London, Great Britain
- 2012 Time for a New State / NSK Folk Art, Tate Modern, London, Great Britain
- 2012 Selection of photographs from Group Junij Art collection, Museum of Architecture and Design, Ljubljana, Slovenia
- 2012 New photography – reality, Savin Art Salon, Žalec, Slovenia
- 2013 50 years of Ljubljana City Art Gallery, Mestna galerija (Municipal Gallery) Ljubljana, Slovenia
- 2013 Photo-Imago 1983–2013, Museo d'Arte Moderno Ugo Cara, Muggia, Italy
- 2015 NSK from Kapital to Capital, Modern Gallery, Ljubljana, Slovenia
- 2016 NSK from Kapital to Capital, Van Abbe Museum, Eidhoven, The Netherlands
- 2016 NSK from Kapital to Capital, Garage Museum of Contemporary Art, Moscow, Russia
- 2017 The Eightiews / The Heritage 1989, Modern Gallery, Ljubljana, Slovenia
- 2017 NSK from Kapital to Capital, Museo Nacional Centro de Arte Reina Sofia, Madrid, Spain

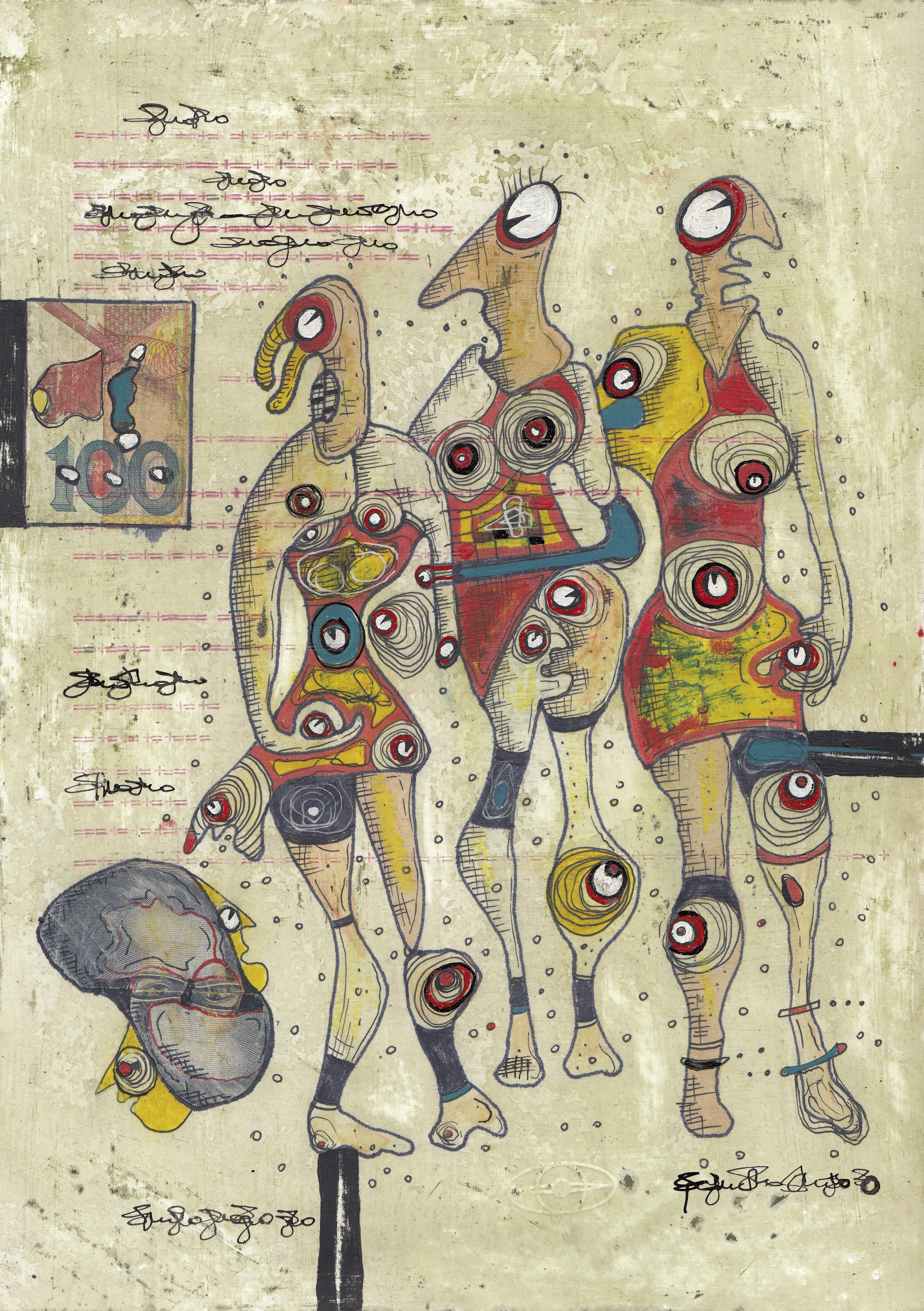
Second Modic Theorem, mixed media, undated

=== Books and catalogs ===
- 1988 Marko Modic: Ekran sanjskih podob (The Screen of Oneiric Images), Moderna galerija (Modern gallery), Ljubljana, Slovenia
- 1990 Marko Modic: Moderna galerija (Modern gallery), Ljubljana, Slovenia
- 1992 Marko Modic: A Fish Book – Galapagos, Villegas Editores, Quito, Ecuador
- 1992 Marko Modic: Tauromaquia
- 1993 Marko Modic: Texturon, Moderna galerija (Modern gallery), Ljubljana, Slovenia
- 1994 Marko Modic: Ljubljana – Luč in dan (Ljubljana – Light and day), Colibri, Ljubljana, Slovenia
- 1995 Marko Modic: Ratio Cut, Cankarjev dom, Ljubljana, Slovenia
- 1998 Marko Modic: Excentrix, EWO, Ljubljana, Slovenia
- 1999 Marko Modic: Alluminations, Mestna galerija (Municipal gallery) Ljubljana, Slovenia
- 2001 Marko Modic: Unseen, Die Gestalten Verlag, Berlin, Germany
- 2006 Marko Modic: Oyster Doubt, Logos, Modena, Italy
- 2015 Marko Modic: The fifth element, Gallery Jakopič, Ljubljana, Slovenia

=== Performances ===
- 1984: Extreme, Auditorium Zanon, Udine, Italy
- 1986: Massacrefish I, Künstler Werkstatte, München, Germany
- 1987: Massacrefish II, Galerija Dante – Marino Cettina, Umag, Croatia
- 1987: Massacrefish III, Craighill Cottage, Blebocraigs, Cupar, Scotland
- 1988: Eau & Feu, Galerija Dante – Marino Cettina, Umag, Croatia
- 1988: Missa Elementorum, SKC, Beograd, Yugoslavia
- 1989: Pulsus, Museum of XIV Winter Olympic Games, Sarajevo, Bosnia
- 1990: Mostromo, Katedrala sv. Vlaha, Dubrovnik, Croatia
- 1994: Ratio Cut, Ca Nova, Oira di Crevoladossola, Italy

=== TV and video ===
- 1985: TV Ljubljana, Miha Vipotnik: Verging on the impossible
- 1988: TV Ljubljana, Marina Grzinic, Aina Smid: Viziorama – Mašinerija slike
- 1988: Radovan Cok: Albedo (performance for one camera)
- 1988: TV Koper, Silvio Odogaso: Marko Modic, L'intelligenza della bellezza
- 1988: BBC North: Rough Guide, West MCMLXXXVIII
- 1993: TV Ljubljana, Stane Sumrak, Koketiranje s sivino možganske skorje
- 1994: AGRFT & Moderna galerija Ljubljana, Gregor Vesel: Texturon
