= Timeline of photography technology =

The following list comprises significant milestones in the development of photography technology.

== Timeline ==
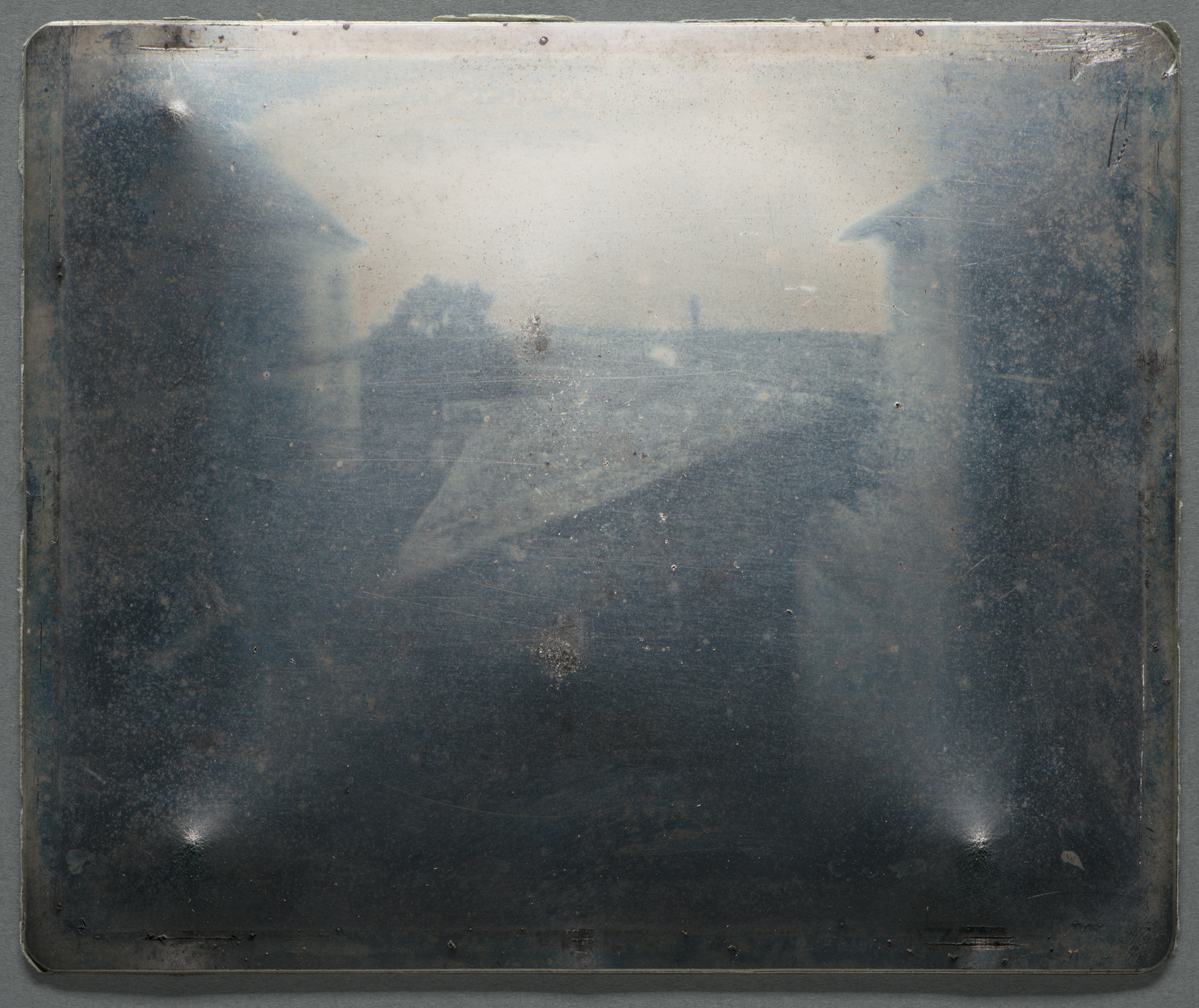
The oldest surviving camera photograph, by Nicéphore Niépce, 1826 or 1827

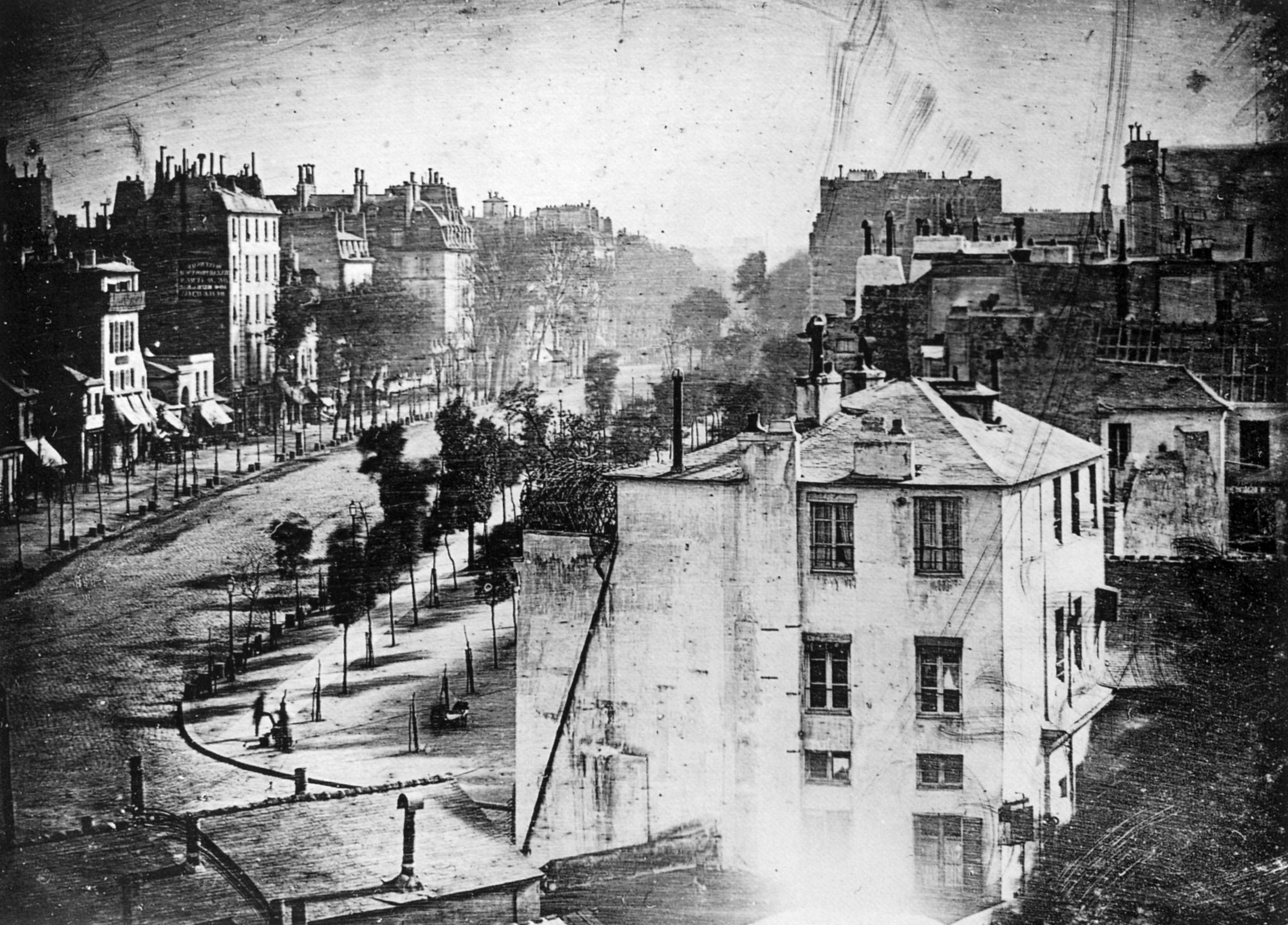
View of the Boulevard du Temple, first photograph including a person (on pavement at lower left), by Daguerre, 1838

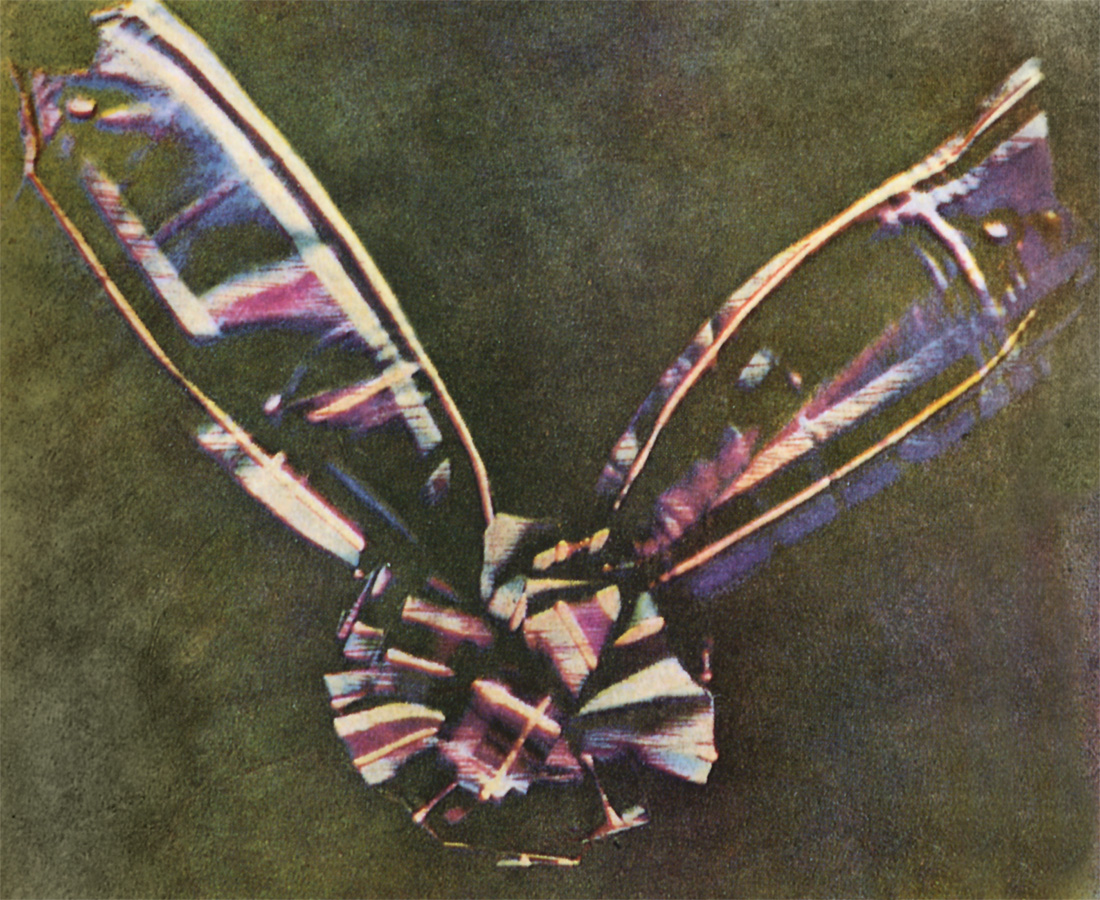
First durable color photograph, 1861

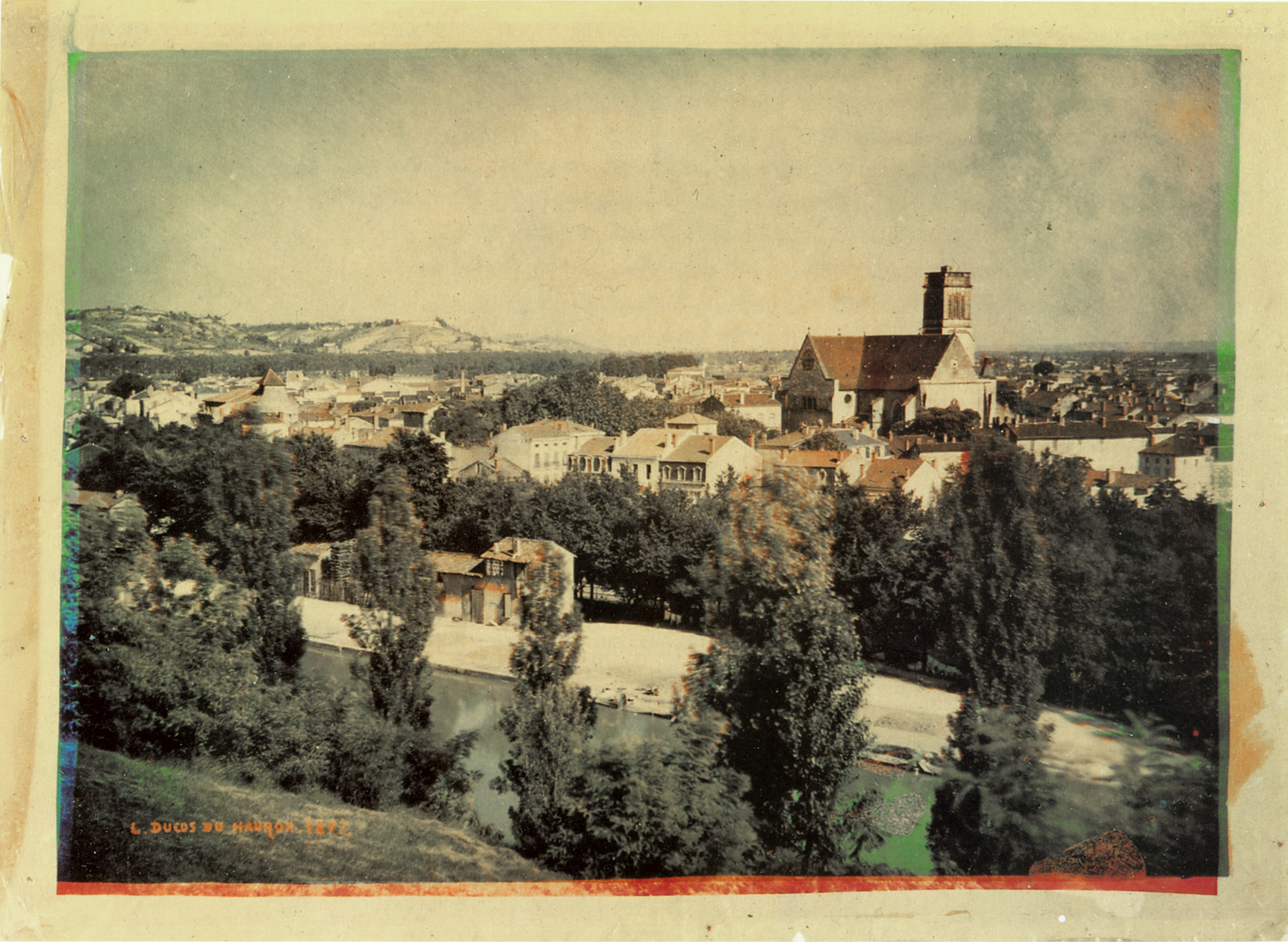
An 1877 photographic color print on paper by Louis Ducos du Hauron. The irregular edges of the superimposed cyan, red and yellow components can be seen.

Muybridge used high-speed photography to make the first animated image sequences photographed in real-time (1878–1887)

=== Prior to the 19th century ===
- 1614 – In Septem planetarum terrestrium spagirica recensio, Angelo Sala reported that "Si lapidem lunearem pulveratum ad solem exponas instar atramenti niggerimus" (When you expose powdered silver nitrate to sunlight, it turns black as ink), and also its effect on paper; silver nitrate wrapped in paper for a year turned black.
- c. 1717 – Johann Heinrich Schulze makes fleeting sun prints of words by using stencils, sunlight, and a bottled mixture of chalk and silver nitrate in nitric acid, simply as an interesting way to demonstrate that the substance inside the bottle darkens where it is exposed to light.
- c. 1794 – Elizabeth Fulhame invented the concept of catalysis and discovered photoreduction. She describes catalysis as a process at length in her 1794 book An Essay On Combustion with a View to a New Art of Dying and Painting, wherein the Phlogistic and Antiphlogistic Hypotheses are Proved Erroneous.

=== 19th century ===
- c. 1800 – Thomas Wedgwood conceives of making permanent pictures of camera images by using a durable surface coated with a light-sensitive chemical. He succeeds only in producing silhouettes and other shadow images, and is unable to make them permanent.
- 1810 – Thomas Johann Seebeck records near-true colours of the solar spectrum on paper sensitised with silver chloride, though is unable to preserve the results, and his report is included in Goethe's Theory of Colours (Zur Farbenlehre).
- 1816 – Nicéphore Niépce succeeds in making negative photographs of camera images on paper coated with silver chloride, but cannot adequately "fix" them to stop them from darkening all over when exposed to light for viewing.
- 1822 – Niépce abandons silver halide photography as hopelessly impermanent and tries using thin coatings of Bitumen of Judea on metal and glass. He creates the first fixed, permanent photograph, a copy of an engraving of Pope Pius VII, by contact printing in direct sunlight without a camera or lens. It is later destroyed; the earliest surviving example of his "heliographic process" is from 1825.
- 1824 – Niépce makes the first durable, light-fast camera photograph, similar to his surviving 1826–1827 photograph on pewter but created on the surface of a lithographic stone. It is destroyed in the course of subsequent experiments.
- 1826 – Mary Somerville, a Scottish science writer and polymath conducted a series of experiments to explore the relationship between light and magnetism and she published her first paper, "The magnetic properties of the violet rays of the solar spectrum", in the Proceedings of the Royal Society.
- 1826 or 1827 – Niépce makes what is now the earliest surviving photograph from nature, a landscape. It requires an exposure in the camera that lasts at least eight hours and probably several days.
- 1834 – Hércules Florence, a French-Brazilian painter and the isolate inventor of photography in Brazil, coined the word photographia for his technique, at least four years before John Herschel coined the English word photography, producing light-fast, permanent images of nature and "real world scenes".
- 1835 – Henry Fox Talbot produces durable silver chloride camera negatives on paper and conceives the two-step negative-positive procedure used in most non-electronic photography up to the present.
- 1839
  - Louis Daguerre publicly introduces his daguerreotype process, which produces highly detailed permanent photographs on silver-plated sheets of copper. At first, it requires several minutes of exposure in the camera, but later improvements reduce the exposure time to a few seconds. Photography suddenly enters the public consciousness and Daguerre's process is soon being used worldwide.
  - Talbot publicly introduces the paper-based process he worked out in 1835, calling it "photogenic drawing", but it requires much longer exposures than the daguerreotype and the results are not as clear and detailed.
  - Hippolyte Bayard presents the first public exhibition of photographs. He claims to have invented a photographic process prior to Daguerre and Talbot.
  - Sarah Anne Bright creates a series of photograms, six of which are known to still exist. These are the earliest surviving photographic images created by a woman.
  - John Herschel introduces hyposulfite of soda (now known as sodium thiosulfate but still nicknamed "hypo") as a highly effective fixer for all silver-based processes. He also makes the first glass negative.
  - Mungo Ponton a Scottish inventor, discovered that dichromates are light sensitive leading to Gum bichromate printing another permanent form of photography and additions for improvements in others including contrast increase with cyanotype, and salt printing.
- 1841 – Talbot introduces his patented calotype (or "talbotype") paper negative process, an improved version of his earlier process that greatly reduces the required exposure time.
- 1843 – Anna Atkins publishes the first photo book, British Algae.
- 1845 – Francis Ronalds invents the first successful camera for continuous recording of the variations in meteorological and geomagnetic parameters over time
- 1848 – Edmond Becquerel makes the first full-color photographs, but they are only laboratory curiosities: an exposure lasting hours or days is required and the colors are so light-sensitive that they sometimes fade right before the viewer's eyes while being examined.
- 1851 – Introduction of the collodion process by Frederick Scott Archer, used for making glass negatives, ambrotypes and tintypes.
- 1850s – Combination printing was introduced, probably first suggested by Hippolyte Bayard when he thought of using a separate negative of a properly exposed sky in combination with a proper negative of the landscape or monument documented for the Missions Héliographiques that started in 1851.
- 1854
  - British Journal of Photography (initially established as the Liverpool Photographic Journal) first issue was published on 14 January 1854
  - André-Adolphe-Eugène Disdéri credited with introduction of the carte de visite (English: visiting card or calling card) format for portraiture. Disdéri uses a camera with multiple lenses that can photograph eight different poses on one large negative. After printing on albumen paper, the images are cut apart and glued to calling-card-size mounts.
- 1857 – In America David Acheson Woodward patents the solar camera, derived from the earlier solar microscope, using sunlight to make enlargements from glass negatives
- 1861 – James Clerk Maxwell presents a projected additive color image of a multicolored ribbon, the first demonstration of color photography by the three-color method he suggested in 1855. It uses three separate black-and-white photographs taken and projected through red, green and blue color filters. The projected image is temporary but the set of three "color separations" is the first durable color photograph.
- 1868 – Louis Ducos du Hauron patents his numerous ideas for color photography based on the three-color principle, including procedures for making subtractive color prints on paper. They are published the following year. Their implementation is not technologically practical at that time, but they anticipate most of the color processes that are later introduced.
- 1871 – The gelatin emulsion is invented by Richard Maddox.
- 1873 – Hermann Wilhelm Vogel discovers dye sensitization, allowing the blue-sensitive but otherwise color-blind photographic emulsions then in use to be made sensitive to green, yellow and red light. Technical problems delay the first use of dye sensitization in a commercial product until the mid-1880s; fully panchromatic emulsions are not in common use until the mid-20th century.
- 1876 – Hurter & Driffield begin systematic evaluation of sensitivity characteristics of photographic emulsions — the science of sensitometry.
- 1878
  - Heat ripening of gelatin emulsions is discovered. This greatly increases sensitivity and makes possible very short "snapshot" exposures.
  - Eadweard Muybridge uses a row of cameras with trip-wires to make a high-speed photographic analysis of a galloping horse. Each picture is taken in less than the two-thousandth part of a second, and they are taken in sufficiently rapid sequence (about 25 per second) that they constitute a brief real-time "movie" that can be viewed by using a device such as a zoetrope, a photographic "first".
- 1887 – Celluloid film base introduced.
- 1888
  - The Kodak n°1 box camera, the first easy-to-use camera, is introduced with the slogan, "You press the button, we do the rest."
  - Louis Le Prince makes Roundhay Garden Scene. It is believed to be the first-ever motion picture on film.
- 1889 – The first commercially available transparent celluloid roll film is introduced by the Eastman Company, later renamed the Eastman Kodak Company and commonly known as Kodak.
- 1891
  - Gabriel Lippmann announces a "method of reproducing colors photographically based on the phenomenon of interference".
  - William Kennedy Laurie Dickson develops the "kinetoscopic" motion picture camera while working for Thomas Edison.
- 1895 – Auguste and Louis Lumière invent the cinématographe.
- 1898 – Kodak introduces the Folding Pocket Kodak.

=== 20th century ===
- 1900 – Kodak introduces their first Brownie, a very inexpensive user-reloadable point-and-shoot box camera.
- 1901 – Kodak introduces the 120 film format.
- 1902 – Arthur Korn devises practical telephotography technology (reduction of photographic images to signals that can be transmitted by wire to other locations).Wire-Photos are in wide use in Europe by 1910, and transmitted to other continents by 1922.
- 1903 – The Lumière brothers invent color cameras.
- 1907 – The Autochrome plate is introduced. It becomes the first commercially successful color photography product.
- 1908 – Kinemacolor, a two-color process known as the first commercial "natural color" system for movies, is introduced.
- 1909 – Kodak announces a 35 mm "safety" motion picture film on an acetate base as an alternative to the highly flammable nitrate base. The motion picture industry discontinues its use after 1911 due to technical imperfections.
- 1912
  - Vest Pocket Kodak using 127 film.
  - Thomas Edison introduces a short-lived 22 mm home motion picture format using acetate "safety" film manufactured by Kodak.
- 1913 – Kodak makes 35 mm panchromatic motion picture film available on a bulk special order basis.
- 1914
  - Kodak introduces the Autographic film system.
  - The World, the Flesh and the Devil, made in Kinemacolor, is the first dramatic feature film in color released.
- 1922 – Kodak makes 35 mm panchromatic motion picture film available as a regular stock.
- 1923
  - The 16 mm amateur motion picture format is introduced by Kodak. Their Ciné-Kodak camera uses reversal film and all 16 mm is on an acetate (safety) base.
  - Harold Edgerton invents the xenon flash lamp for strobe photography.
- 1925 – The Leica introduces the 35 mm format to still photography.
- 1926 – Kodak introduces its 35 mm Motion Picture Duplicating Film for duplicate negatives. Previously, motion picture studios used a second camera alongside the primary camera to create a duplicate negative.
- 1932
  - "Flowers and Trees", the first full-color cartoon, is made in Technicolor by Disney.
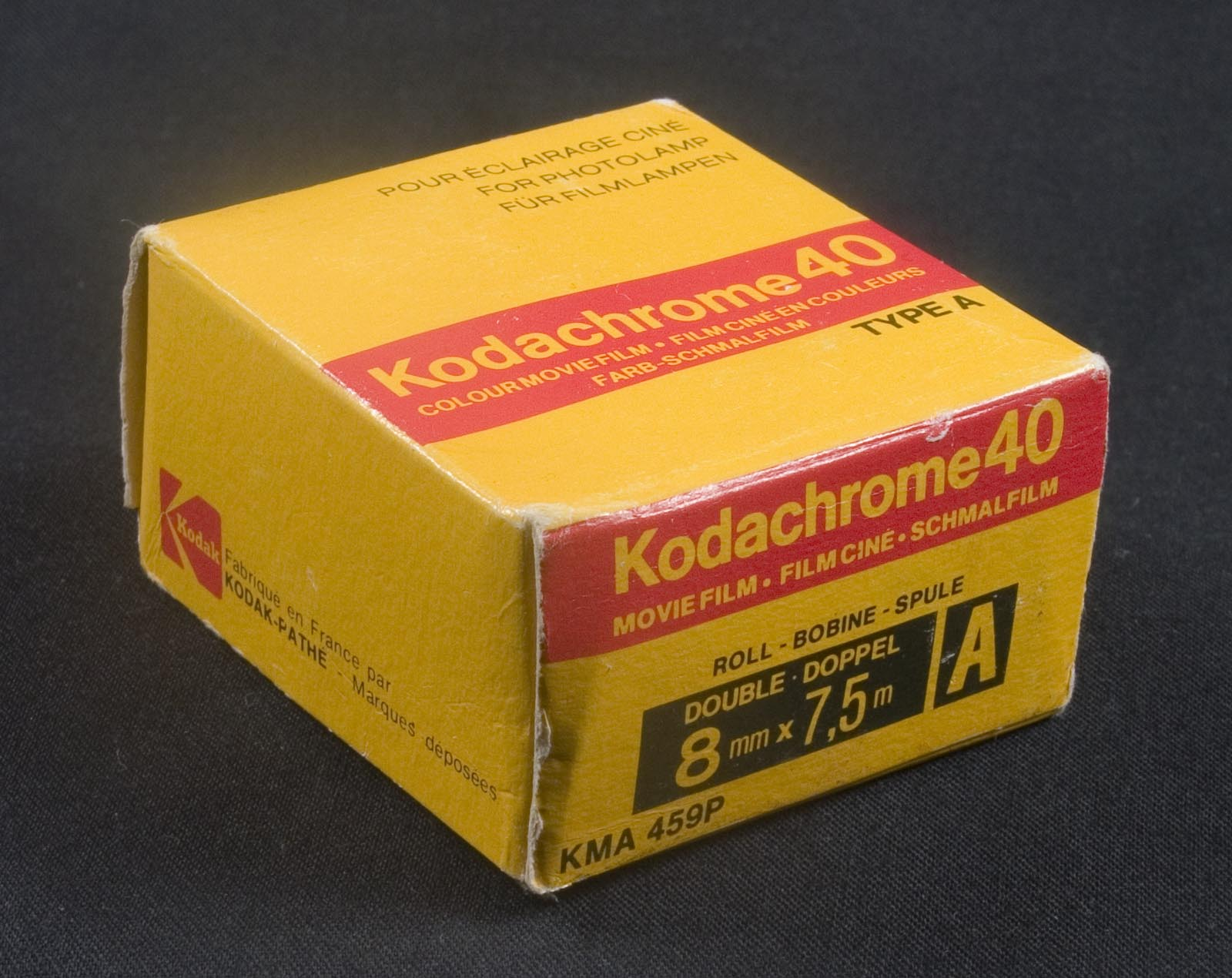
  - In , the widely-used photographic film paper, Kodachrome was introduced.
    Kodak introduces the first 8 mm amateur motion picture film, cameras, and projectors.
- 1934 – The 135 film cartridge is introduced, making 35 mm easy to use for photography.
- 1935
  - Becky Sharp, the first feature film made in the full-colour "three-strip" version of Technicolor, is released.
  - Introduction of Kodachrome multi-layered color reversal film (16 mm only; 8 mm and 35 mm follow in 1936, sheet film in 1938).
- 1936
  - Introduction by IHAGEE of the Ihagee Kine Exakta 1, the first 35 mm SLR (Single Lens Reflex) camera.
  - Agfacolor Neu (English: New Agfacolor) color reversal film for home movies and slides.
- 1939
  - Agfacolor negative and positive 35 mm color film stock for professional motion picture use (not for making paper prints).
  - The View-Master 3-D viewer and its "reels" of seven small stereoscopic image pairs on Kodachrome film are introduced.
- 1942 – Kodacolor, the first color film that yields negatives for making chromogenic color prints on paper. Roll films for snapshot cameras only, 35 mm not available until 1958.
- 1947
  - Dennis Gabor invents holography.
  - Harold Edgerton develops the Rapatronic camera for the U.S. government.
- 1948
  - The Hasselblad camera is introduced.
  - Edwin H. Land introduces the first Polaroid instant camera.
- 1949 – The Contax S camera is introduced, the first 35 mm SLR camera with a pentaprism eye-level viewfinder.
- 1952 – Bwana Devil, a low-budget polarized 3-D film, premieres in late November and starts a brief 3-D craze that begins in earnest in 1953 and fades away during 1954.
- 1954 – Leica M Introduced

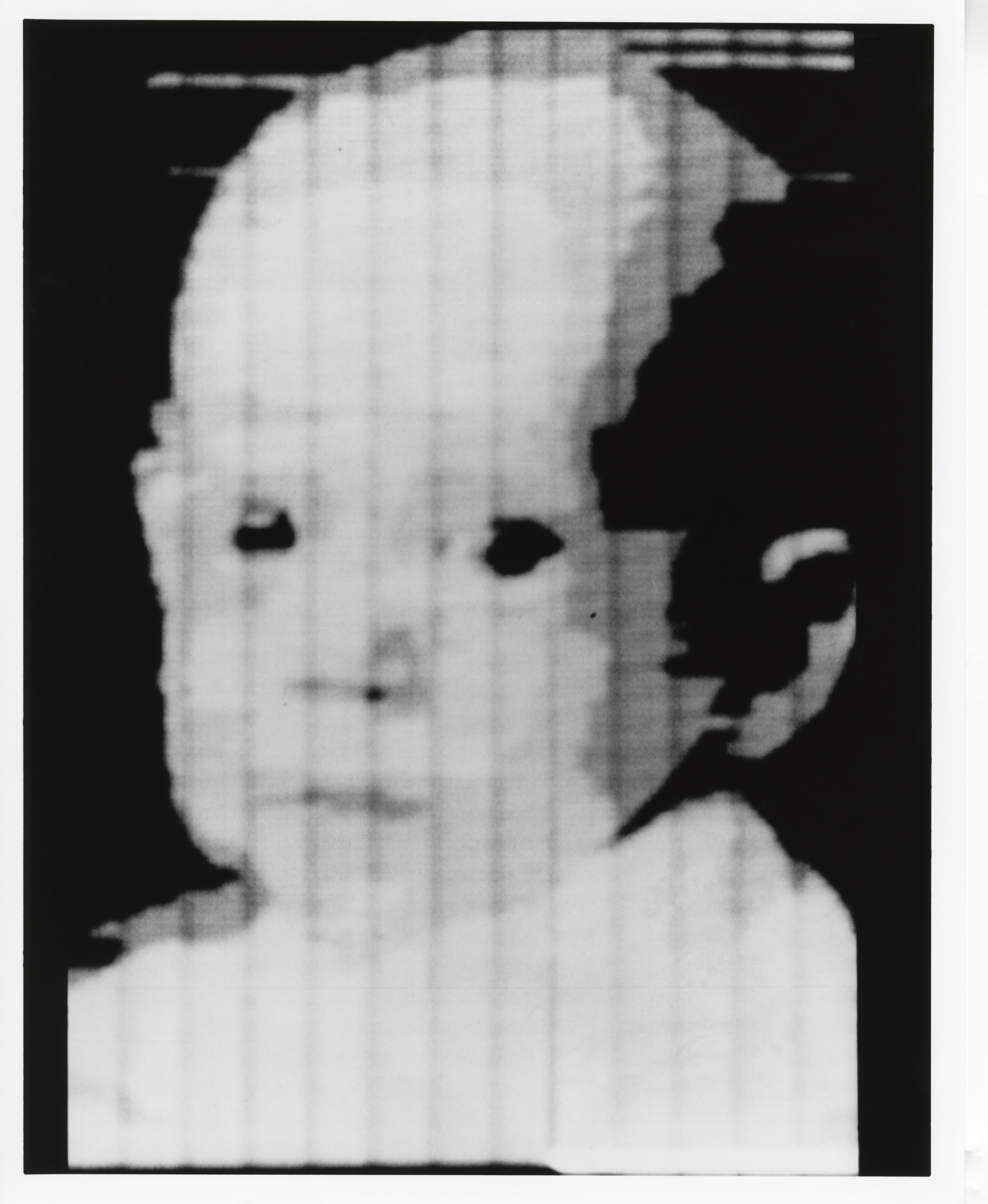
Photograph scanned into a digital computer, 1957

- 1956 - The Chemigram was defined by the belgian artist Pierre Cordier.
- 1957
  - First Asahi Pentax SLR introduced.
  - First digital computer acquisition of scanned photographs, by Russell Kirsch et al. at the U.S. National Bureau of Standards (now the NIST).
- 1959
  - Nikon F introduced.
  - AGFA introduces the first fully automatic camera, the Optima.
- 1963 – Kodak introduces the Instamatic.
- 1964
  - First Pentax Spotmatic SLR introduced.
  - Canon introduces the Canon FL lens mount with the Canon FX
- 1967 – First MOS 10 by 10 active pixel array shown by Peter J. W. Noble
- 1972 – Integrated Photomatrix (Noble) demonstrates for 64 by 64 MOS active pixel array
- 1973 – Fairchild Semiconductor releases the first large image forming CCD chip: 100 rows and 100 columns of pixels.

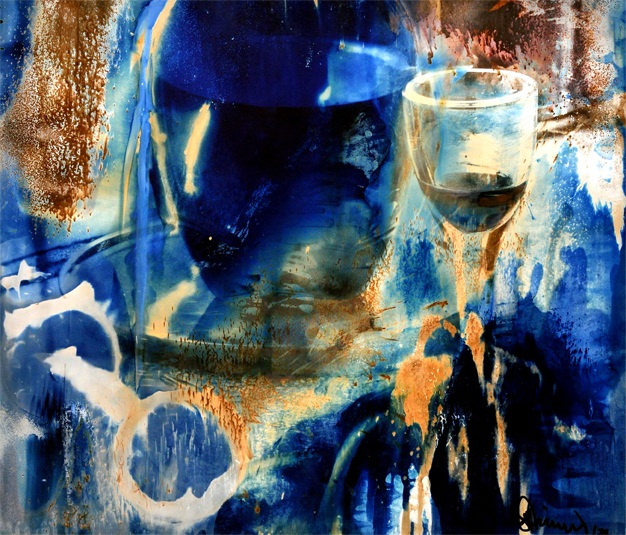
Josef H. Neumann: Chemogram Gustav I (C)1974

- 1974 – Josef H. Neumann created the first Chemograms combining the disciplines painting and photography within the photographic layer for the first time.
- 1975 – Bryce Bayer of Kodak develops the Bayer filter mosaic pattern for CCD color image sensors.
- 1976 – Steadicam becomes available.
- 1979 – The NHK invents HD cameras.
- 1984 – Kerns H. Powers invents the 16:9 aspect ratio.
- 1986 – Kodak scientists invent the world's first megapixel sensor.
- 1987
  - Canon releases the first camera for its fully electronic autofocus EF lens mount, the EOS 650
  - Photoshop developed by Thomas and John Knoll
- 1990 — Adobe Photoshop 1.0 released on February 19, for Macintosh exclusively.
- 1992 – Photo CD created by Kodak.
- 1993–95 – The Jet Propulsion Laboratory develops devices using CMOS or active pixel sensors.
- 1994 – Nikon introduces the first optical-stabilized lens.
- 1995 – "Kodak DC40 and the Apple QuickTake 100 become the first digital cameras marketed for consumers."
- 1996 – Eastman Kodak, FujiFilm, AgfaPhoto, and Konica introduce the Advanced Photo System (APS).
- 1997 – first known publicly shared picture via a cell phone, by Philippe Kahn.

=== 21st century onwards ===
- 2000 – J-SH04 introduced by J-Phone, the first commercially available mobile phone with a camera that can take and share still pictures.
- 2005 – AgfaPhoto files for bankruptcy. The production of Agfa brand consumer films ends.
- 2006 – Dalsa produces a 111 megapixel CCD sensor, the highest resolution at that time.
- 2008 – Polaroid announces it is discontinuing the production of all instant film products, citing the rise of digital imaging technology.
- 2009
  - Kodak announces the discontinuance of Kodachrome film.
  - FujiFilm launches world's first digital 3D camera with 3D printing capabilities.
- 2011 – Lytro releases the first pocket-sized consumer light-field camera, capable of refocusing images after they are taken.
- 2018 – Kodak resumes the production of Ektachrome film.

== See also ==
- Timeline of historic inventions
- List of inventions named after people
- Computational photography
- Quadcopter § Photography
