= Chemogram =

Experimental art form

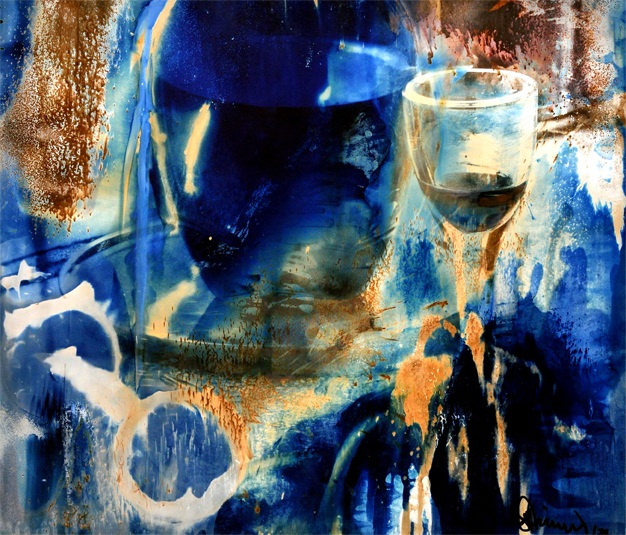
Josef H. Neumann: Gustav I (1976)

A chemogram is an experimental art medium where a photographic image is partly or fully enlarged and processed onto photographic paper in the darkroom and afterwards selectively painted over in full light with chemicals used in photographic processing. Chemograms were invented in 1974 by the German photo artist Josef H. Neumann.

== History ==
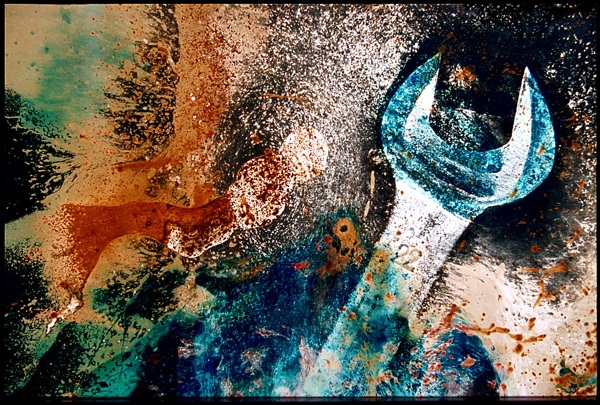
Josef H. Neumann: Traumarbeit 1976

Chemograms are a further development of the "chemigram" originally presented in 1956 by the Belgian artist Pierre Cordier. Cordier was probably influenced by the Dresden painter Edmund Kesting, who had been experimenting with photo chemicals on black and white photo paper six years earlier, in 1950, and who presented his resulting works under the heading of "chemical painting". Although Johann Schulze, Hippolyte Bayard, Maurice Tabard and Kesting had experimented in obtaining chemigram-like images before, Cordier is considered the pioneer of the chemigram and of its development as a means of artistic expression.

The term "chemogram" (German: Chemogramm) was coined in 1974 by the photo designer Josef H. Neumann from Dortmund. He had learned the technique of creating chemigrams from his Professor Pan Walther, who had adopted it from Kesting – both coming from Dresden.

Neumann worked not only with a brush or cotton ball on black and white photo paper, but also exposed photo during the process, distinguishing Neumann's "chemogram" from the truly cameraless photogram. These artworks were almost simultaneously with the invention of photography of various important artists as distinctive in its initial phase Hippolyte Bayard, Thomas Wedgwood, William Henry Fox Talbot and later inziniert in the twenties Man Ray and László Moholy-Nagy and in the 30s by the painter Edmund Kesting and Christian Schad, by draped objects directly on suitably sensitized photographic paper and using a light source without use camera pictured. As the optic during the production process played a decisive role for him, he changed the term "chemigram" by replacing the letter I with an O.

Neumann created the first pieces with this technique at the Dortmund University of Applied Sciences and Arts from 1974 to 1976. The first chemograms were exhibited in 1976 at the "Fotografik Studio Gallerie Prof. Pan Walther" in Münster.

== Process ==
A chemogram is a product of both photographic processing and painting on photographic paper. Unlike chemigrams the production process of chemograms consists of two different steps. First an enlarger is used to partly or fully process a photographic image onto photographic paper in the darkness of the darkroom. As soon as the preferred development of the image is reached, the photographic process is interrupted and the photographic paper is exposed to full light and treated with developer and fixer (or other chemicals) like a chemigram. The procedure can be repeated until the chemogram is finished.

During the first part of the production Neumann had full control over the selection of the picture and the duration of the photographic processing, while in the second part the control remains only at the places where the colorless chemicals are applied. The exact reactions of the chemicals that produce the final colors at these locations are largely unpredictable. Thus, these first chemograms by Neumann (1974-1978) originated as absolute pieces that cannot be reproduced in the original creative process.

Josef H. Neumann:Trocadero Paris (2017)

In September 2018, the Museo de Arte Moderno in Bucaramanga, Colombia, published works by Neumann, which he called “digital chemograms” under the influence of now digital techniques and the use of a “digital brush” on the computer.
