= Fine-art photography =

Genre of photography

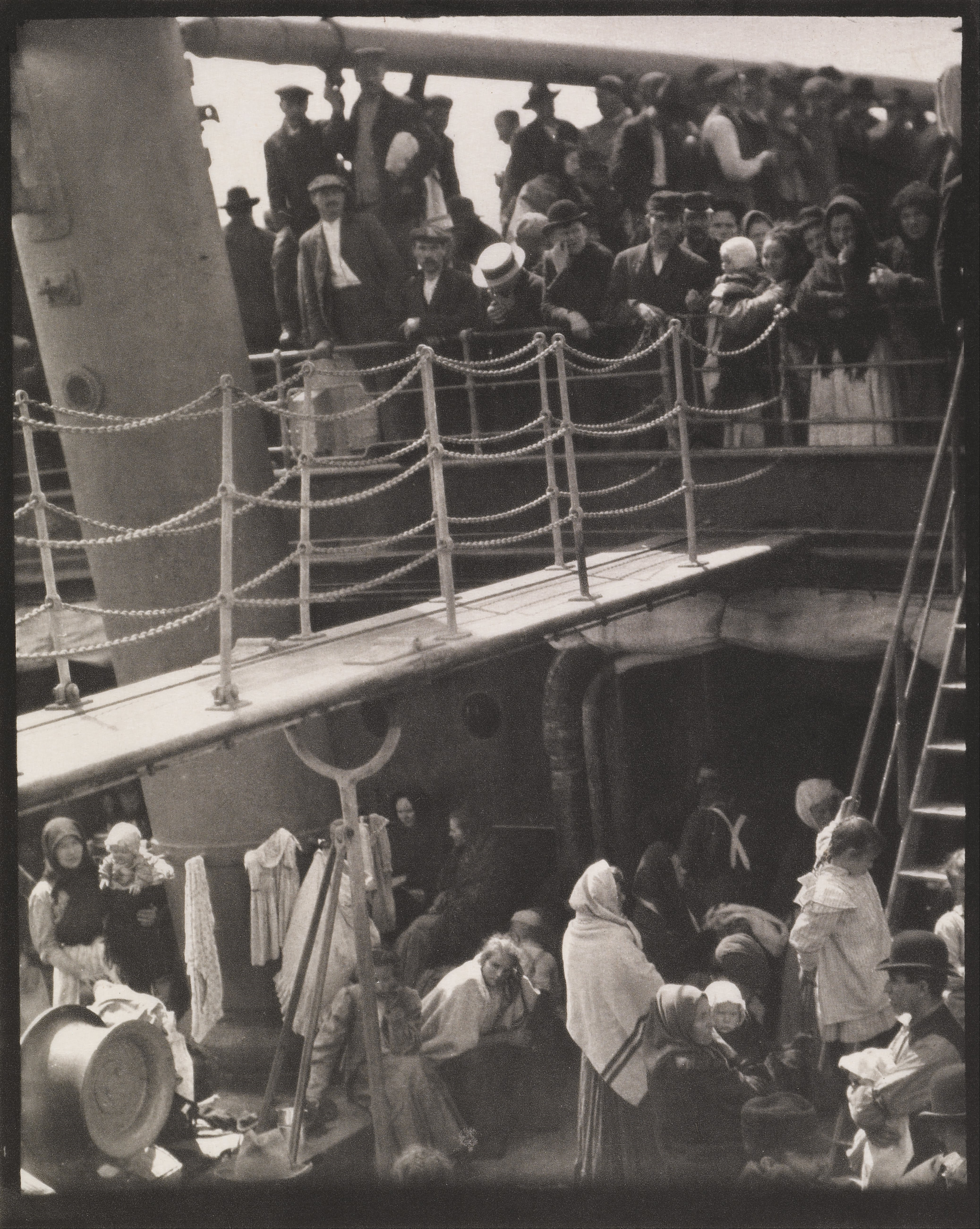
Alfred Stieglitz's photograph The Steerage (1907) was an early work of artistic modernism, and considered by many historians to be the most important photograph ever made. Stieglitz was notable for introducing fine art photography into museum collections.

Fine-art photography is photography created in line with the vision of the photographer as artist, using photography as a medium for creative expression. The goal of fine-art photography is to express an idea, a message, or an emotion. This stands in contrast to representational photography, such as photojournalism, which provides a documentary visual account of specific subjects and events, literally representing objective reality, rather than the subjective intent of the photographer; and commercial photography, the primary focus of which is to advertise products or services.

== History ==
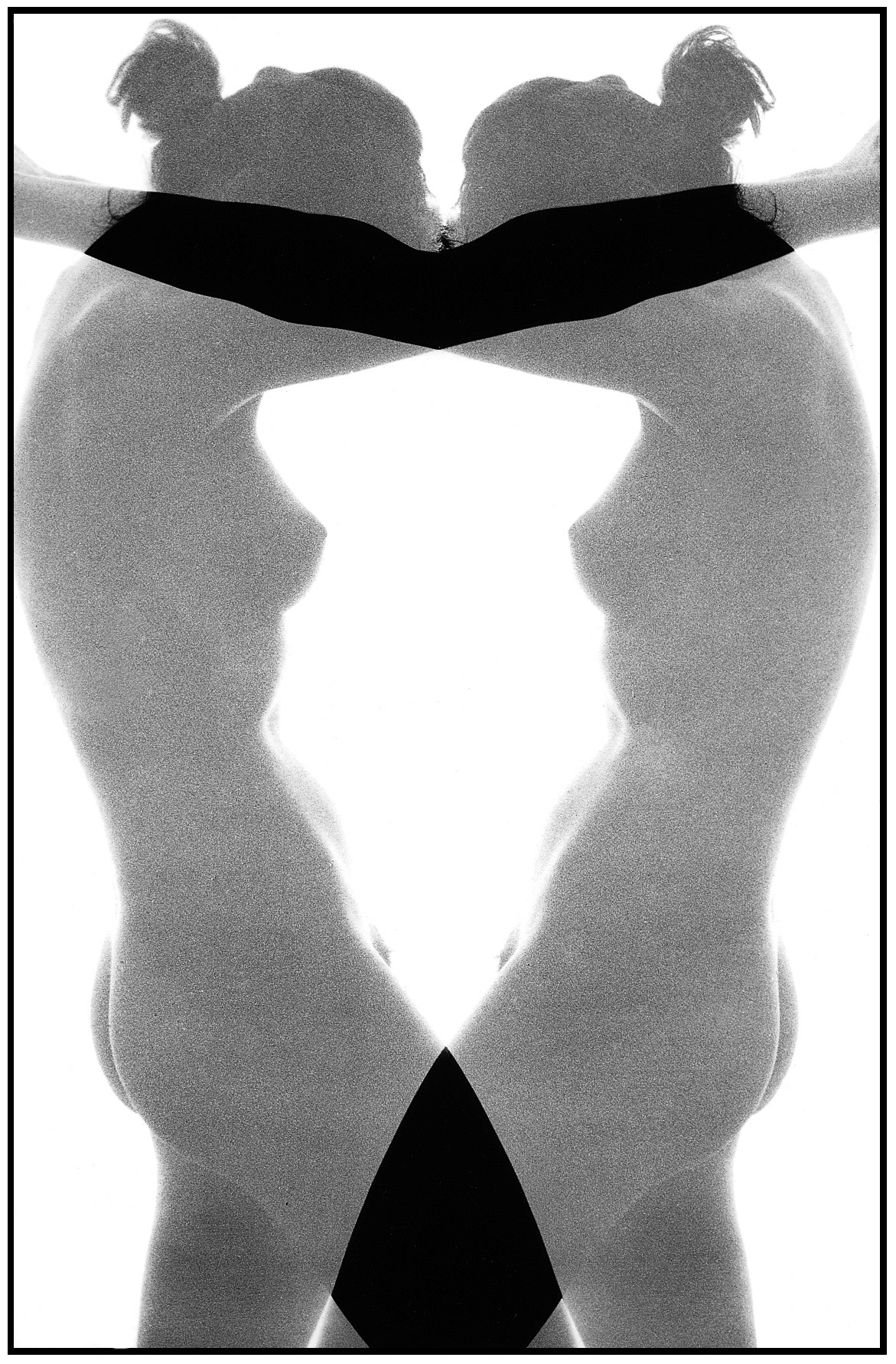
Depiction of nudity has been one of the dominating themes in fine-art photography. Nude composition 19 from 1988 by Jaan Künnap.

=== Invention through 1940s ===
One photography historian claimed that "the earliest exponent of 'Fine-Art' or composition photography was John Edwin Mayall", who exhibited daguerreotypes illustrating the Lord's Prayer in 1851. Successful attempts to make photography a fine art can be traced to Victorian era practitioners such as Julia Margaret Cameron, Charles Lutwidge Dodgson, and Oscar Gustave Rejlander and others. In the United States, F. Holland Day, Alfred Stieglitz and Edward Steichen were instrumental in making photography a fine-art, and Stieglitz was especially notable in introducing it into museum collections.

In the UK as recently as 1960, photography was not really recognised as a fine-art as reported by S. D. Jouhar in The Photographic Journal.

Until the late 1970s several genres predominated, such as nudes, portraits, and natural landscapes (exemplified by Ansel Adams). Breakthrough 'star' artists in the 1970s and 80s, such as Sally Mann, Robert Mapplethorpe, Robert Farber and Cindy Sherman, still relied heavily on such genres, although seeing them with fresh eyes. Others investigated a snapshot aesthetic approach.

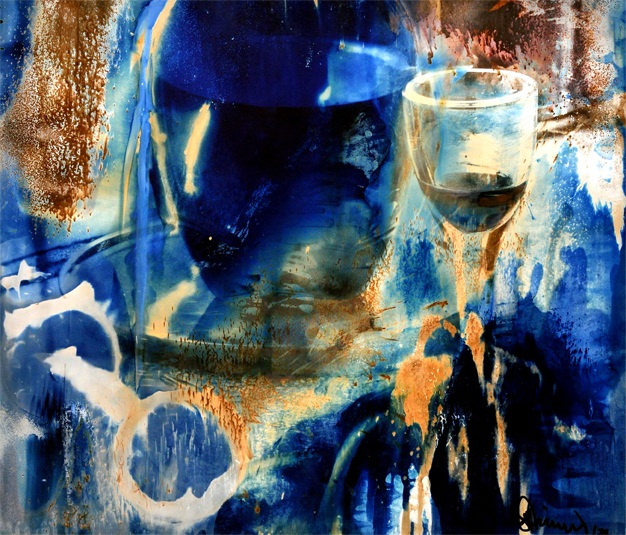
Josef H. Neumann: Chemogram Gustav I 1976

In the mid-1970s Josef H. Neumann developed chemograms, which are products of both photographic processing and painting on photographic paper. Before the spread of computers and the use of image processing software the process of creating chemograms can be considered an early form of analog post-production, in which the original image is altered after the enlarging process. Unlike works of digital post-production each chemogram is a unique piece.

American organizations, such as the Aperture Foundation and the Museum of Modern Art(MoMA), have done much to keep photography at the forefront of the fine-arts. MoMA's establishment of a department of photography in 1940 and appointment of Beaumont Newhall as its first curator are often cited as institutional confirmation of photography's status as an art.

=== 1950s to present day ===
Andreas Gursky, Shanghai, 2000, C-print mounted to plexiglass, 119 x 81 inches

There a growing trend toward a careful staging and lighting of the picture, rather than hoping to "discover" it ready-made. Photographers Gregory Crewdson, and Jeff Wall are noted for the quality of their staged pictures. New technological trends in digital photography have led to a new direction in full spectrum photography, where careful filtering choices across the ultraviolet, visible and infrared lead to new artistic visions.

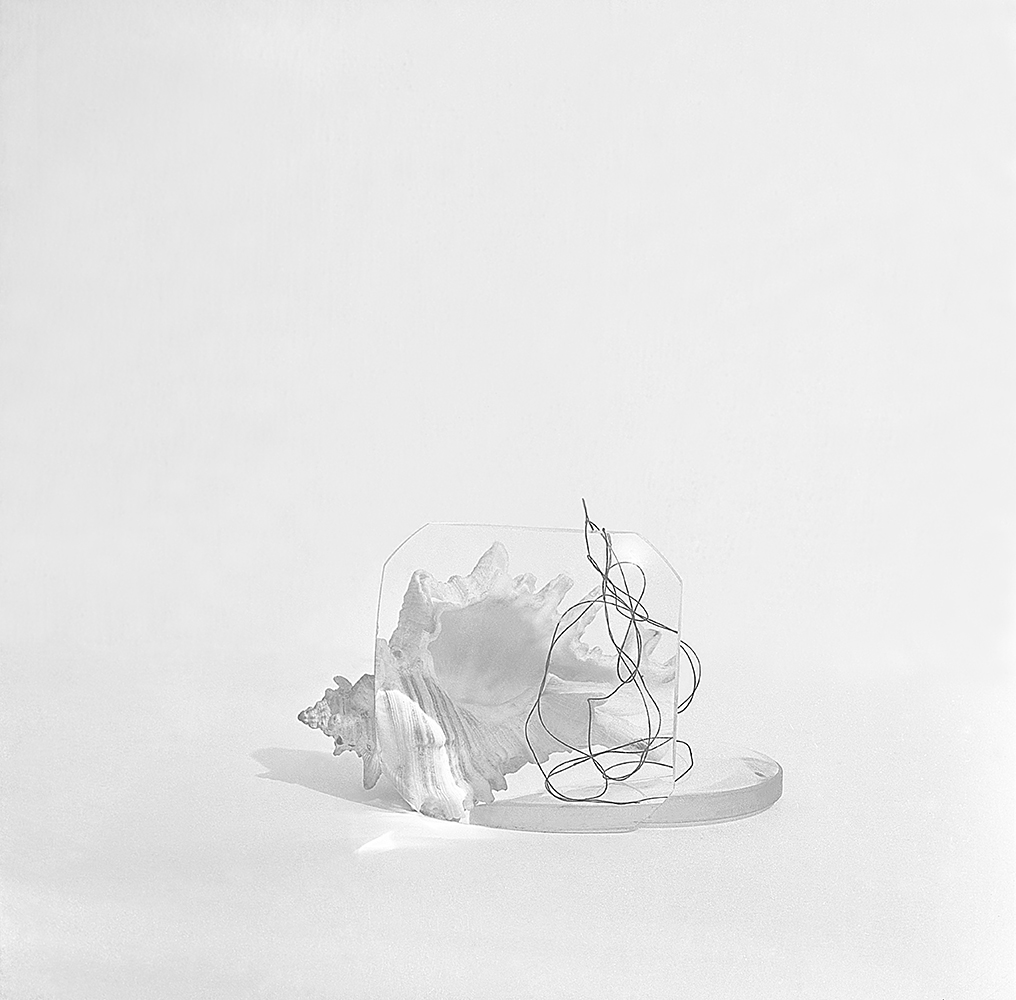
Vasiliy Ryabchenko, Still life (1970s)

As printing technologies have improved since around 1980, a photographer's art prints reproduced in a finely-printed limited-edition book have now become an area of strong interest to collectors. This is because books usually have high production values, a short print run, and their limited market means they are almost never reprinted. The collector's market in photography books by individual photographers is developing rapidly.

According to Art Market Trends 2004 7,000 photographs were sold in auction rooms in 2004, and photographs averaged a 7.6 percent annual price rise from 1994 and 2004. Around 80 percent were sold in the United States, although auction sales only record a fraction of total private sales. There is now a collectors' market for which the established art photographers will produce high quality archival prints in strictly limited editions. Attempts by online art retailers to sell fine photography to the general public alongside prints of paintings have had mixed results, with strong sales coming only from the traditional major photographers such as Ansel Adams.

In addition to the "digital movement" towards manipulation, filtering, or resolution changes, some fine artists deliberately seek a "naturalistic", including "natural lighting" as a value in itself. Sometimes the art work as in the case of Gerhard Richter consists of a photographic image that has been subsequently painted over with oil paints and/or contains some political or historical significance beyond the image itself. The existence of "photographically-projected painting" now blurs the line between painting and photography which traditionally was absolute.

== Genres and approaches ==
The principal genres of fine-art photography are inherited from painting and include landscape, portraiture, the nude, and still life. Several of these genres have commercial or utilitarian counterparts from which fine-art practice is conventionally distinguished, though individual works often move between categories. The categories are not mutually exclusive: the typological grids of Bernd and Hilla Becher, for example, have been received as both urban landscape and conceptual photography.

=== Landscape ===
Landscape is among the oldest subjects in fine-art photography, distinct from commercial and survey work in its aesthetic intention and institutional reception. It encompasses both natural and built environments.

==== Natural landscape ====
Fine-art natural landscape photography draws on nineteenth-century American survey work, particularly Timothy H. O'Sullivan's photographs for the Government Surveys (1867-1879), whose large-format prints were later received as fine-art. Twentieth-century recognition came through Group f/64 (founded 1932) and through Ansel Adams's photographs of Yosemite and the Sierra Nevada, which came to define American fine-art landscape photography.

==== Urban landscape ====
Fine-art photographers have engaged the built environment since the late nineteenth century. Eugène Atget's documentation of Paris (1890s-1927) was received as fine-art through the surrealists and through Berenice Abbott, whose Changing New York (1935-1939) followed. From 1959, Bernd and Hilla Becher's deadpan typological grids were embraced by conceptual art; the Bechers taught the Düsseldorf School including Andreas Gursky, Thomas Struth, Candida Höfer, and Thomas Ruff, whose work entered major museum collections. The 1975 New Topographics exhibition at the George Eastman House brought human-altered landscape into the fine-art museum as a critical aesthetic position.

=== Portrait ===
Since the medium's invention, portraiture has been a sustained focus of fine-art practice. Fine-art portraits emphasise aesthetic, psychological, and conceptual content rather than producing a record or likeness for practical use. The portrait photographer Julia Margaret Cameron described her aim as "to ennoble photography and to secure it for the character and uses of high art", a fine-art positioning of the medium shared by her contemporary Félix Nadar. August Sander's Menschen des 20. Jahrhunderts became a foundational work of New Objectivity photography, and Richard Avedon's minimalist white-background portraits were the subject of a 2002 retrospective at the Metropolitan Museum of Art.

=== Nude ===
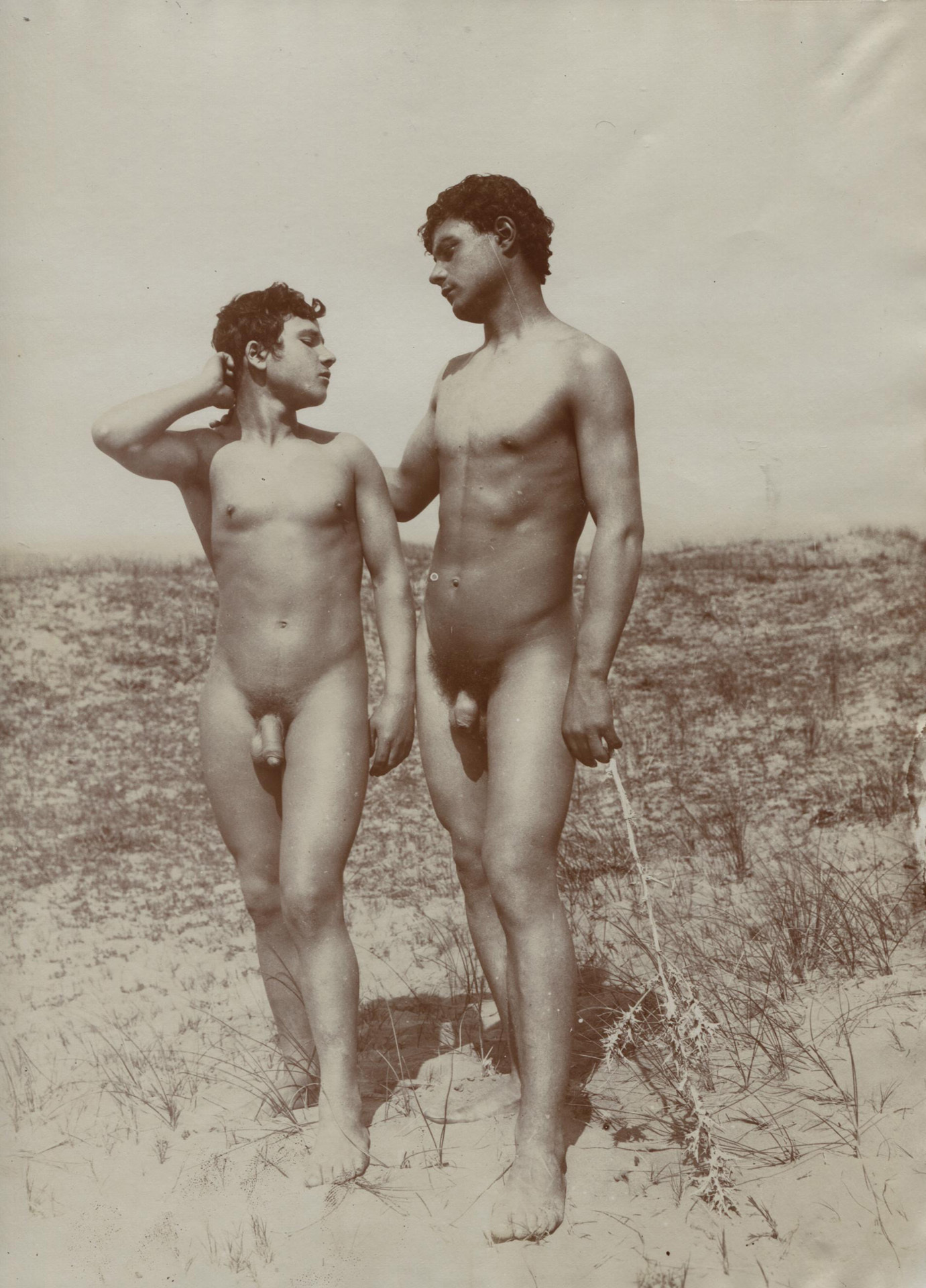
”Two nude boys along the seaside” by Wilhelm von Gloeden.

Photographers have worked with the nude as a fine-art subject from photography's earliest decades, drawing on the pictorial tradition of the nude in painting and sculpture. Fine-art treatments emphasise formal and conceptual qualities of the body, in contrast to commercial erotic and pornographic photography. The nude entered photography shortly after the medium's invention as a teaching aid for painters and sculptors; by the early twentieth century, it had become a central subject of fine-art practice in the pictorialist work of F. Holland Day and the modernist nudes of Edward Weston and Imogen Cunningham of Group f/64. Later fine-art nude photographers include Bill Brandt, Robert Mapplethorpe, Sally Mann, and John Coplans.

=== Still life ===
Still life has been a fine-art genre in photography since the 1840s. According to David Campany, the intertwining of art and commercial photography is nowhere more evident than in still life, whose rise to equal status with landscape and portraiture followed the rise of commodity culture. Within fine-art practice, still life functions through the deliberate arrangement of objects to carry symbolic or formal meaning, drawing on the seventeenth-century Vanitas tradition in painting. Pioneers including William Henry Fox Talbot produced still life images that functioned as documents, aesthetic compositions, and proto-advertisements at once. In the 1920s, modernists including Albert Renger-Patzsch and Edward Weston worked between fine-art still life and commercial advertising, and Karl Blossfeldt's plant studies entered the New Objectivity movement after the 1928 publication of Urformen der Kunst.

=== Street ===
Distinct from photojournalism in its artistic rather than reportorial intent, street photography developed as a fine-art genre. Henri Cartier-Bresson's 1952 book The Decisive Moment articulated the decisive moment concept and is widely regarded as foundational to the genre. John Szarkowski's 1967 Museum of Modern Art exhibition New Documents described the work of Diane Arbus, Lee Friedlander, and Garry Winogrand as redirecting documentary photography toward "more personal ends".

=== Conceptual and staged ===
From the mid-1960s, the Conceptual Art movement used photography as a vehicle for ideas, performance documentation, and multimedia installation rather than as an autonomous image. Photographers and artists working in this idea-based mode included John Baldessari, Sol LeWitt, Bruce Nauman, and Ed Ruscha; the Art Institute of Chicago's 2011 Light Years exhibition credited the period with bringing photography "definitively into the mainstream of contemporary art". The typological grids of Bernd and Hilla Becher were also embraced as conceptual photography. From the late 1970s, staged photographic tableaux developed as a fine-art mode in which the photographer constructs the scene rather than recording a found subject; Cindy Sherman's Untitled Film Stills (1977-80), drawing on commercial and mass-cultural imagery, were reviewed in The New York Times in 1981 as exemplary of photography's post-modern turn.

=== Abstract and experimental ===
Abstract photography circulates within fine-art through international survey exhibitions and critical anthologies. The Italian Futurists pioneered avant-garde photographic theorisation with Anton Giulio Bragaglia's 1912 Fotodinamismo futurista, and at the Bauhaus, László Moholy-Nagy's "New Vision" (Neues Sehen) used unexpected framings and angles to challenge habitual ways of seeing. Contemporary cameraless and direct-process practitioners include Wolfgang Tillmans (the Freischwimmer series, begun 2003), Marco Breuer, Walead Beshty, and James Welling.

=== Overlap with other genres ===
Although fine-art photography may overlap with many other genres of photography, the overlaps with fashion photography and photojournalism merit special attention. The catalogue for the Museum of Modern Art's 2004 exhibition Fashioning Fiction in Photography since 1990 described the relationship between these categories as "a particularly fruitful moment in the exchange between fine-art and commercial photography."

In 1996 it was stated that there had been a "recent blurring of lines between commercial illustrative photography and fine-art photography," especially in the area of fashion. Evidence for the overlap of fine-art photography and fashion photography includes lectures, exhibitions, trade fairs such as Art Basel Miami Beach, and books. Fashion photographers including Richard Avedon, Irving Penn, Cecil Beaton, and Man Ray are widely included within fine-art photography exhibitions and collections.

Photojournalism and fine-art photography overlapped beginning in the "late 1960s and 1970s, when... news photographers struck up liaisons with art photography and painting". In 1974 the International Center of Photography opened, with emphases on both "humanitarian photojournalism" and "art photography". By 1987, "pictures that were taken on assignments for magazines and newspapers now regularly reappear[ed] - in frames - on the walls of museums and galleries".

Smartphone apps such as Snapchat sometimes are used for fine-art photography.

== Framing and print size ==
Until the mid-1950s it was widely considered vulgar and pretentious to frame a photograph for a gallery exhibition. Prints were usually simply pasted onto blockboard or plywood, or given a white border in the darkroom and then pinned at the corners onto display boards. Prints were thus shown without any glass reflections obscuring them. Steichen's famous The Family of Man exhibition was unframed, the pictures pasted to panels. Even as late as 1966 Bill Brandt's MoMA show was unframed, with simple prints pasted to thin plywood. From the mid-1950s to about 2000 most gallery exhibitions had prints behind glass. Since about 2000 there has been a noticeable move toward once again showing contemporary gallery prints on boards and without glass. In addition, throughout the twentieth century, there was a noticeable increase in the size of prints.

== Politics ==
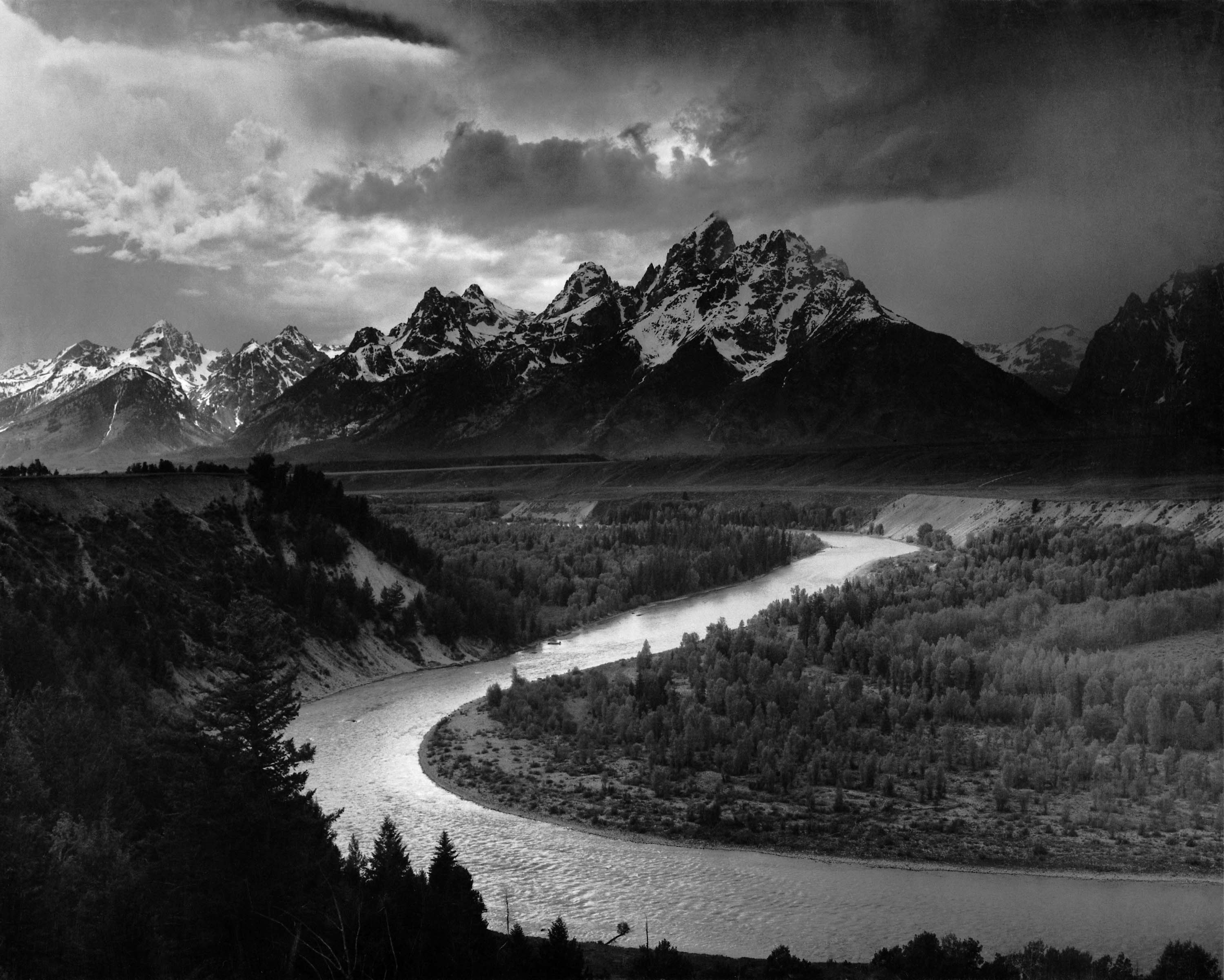
Ansel Adams' The Tetons and the Snake River (1942)

Fine-art photography is created primarily as an expression of the artist's vision, but as a byproduct it has also been important in advancing certain causes. The work of Ansel Adams in Yosemite and Yellowstone provides an example. Adams is one of the most widely recognized fine-art photographers of the 20th century, and was an avid promoter of conservation. While his primary focus was on photography as art, some of his work raised public awareness of the beauty of the Sierra Nevada and helped to build political support for their protection.

Such photography has also had effects in the area of censorship law and free expression, due to its concern with the nude body.

== Attitudes of artists in other fields ==
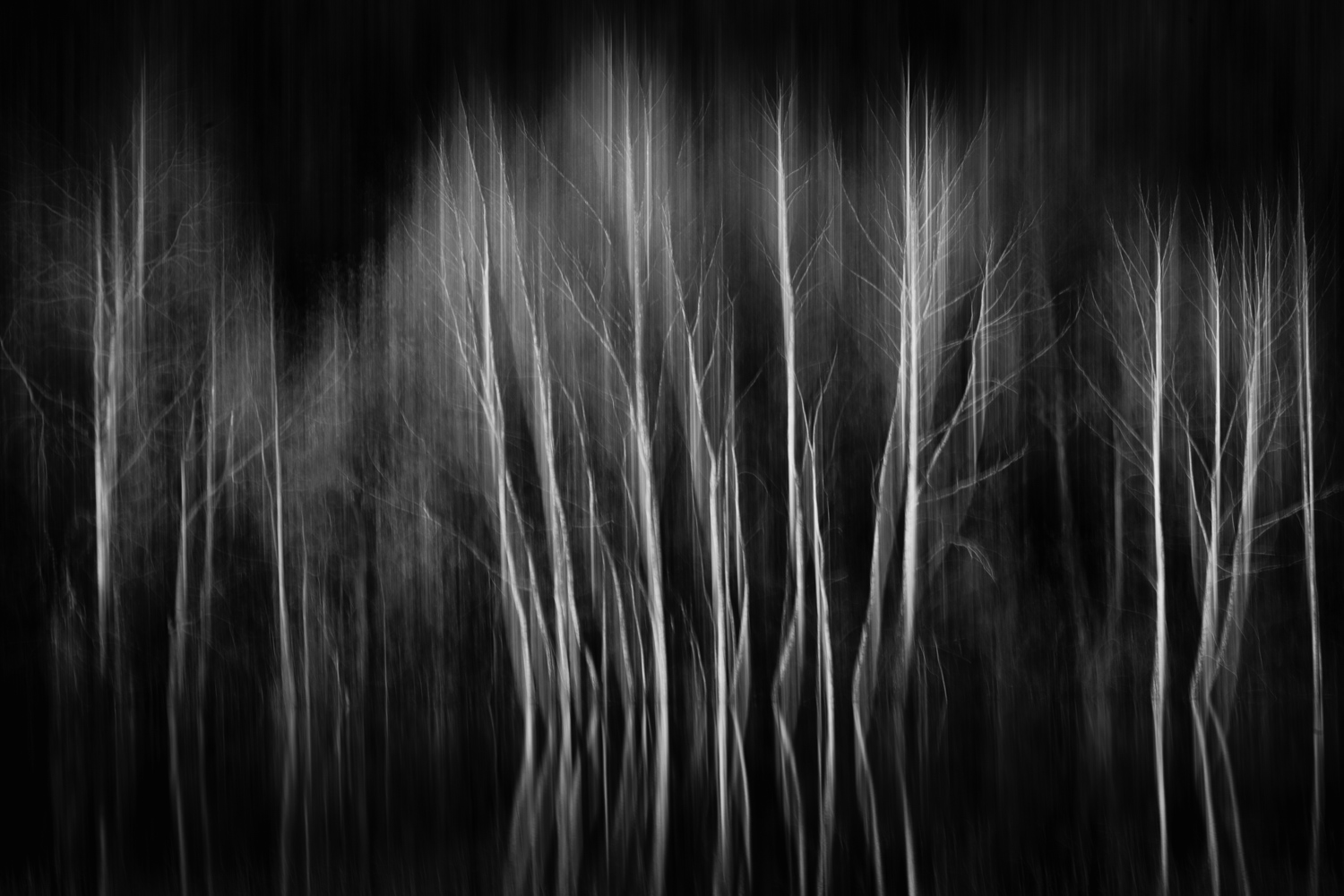
Martin Vorel, Birches (2021)

The reactions of artists and writers have contributed significantly to perceptions of photography as fine-art. Prominent painters have asserted their interest in the medium:

I have always been very interested in photography. I have looked at far more photographs than I have paintings. Because their reality is stronger than reality itself.

— Francis Bacon

Noted authors, similarly, have responded to the artistic potential of photography:

...it does seem to me that Capa has proved beyond all doubt that the camera need not be a cold mechanical device. Like the pen, it is as good as the man who uses it. It can be the extension of mind and heart...

— John Steinbeck

== List of definitions ==
Here is a list of definitions of the related terms "art photography", "artistic photography", and "fine-art photography".

=== In reference books ===
Among the definitions that can be found in reference books are:

- "Art photography": "Photography that is done as a fine art – that is, done to express the artist's perceptions and emotions and to share them with others".
- "Fine art photography": "A picture that is produced for sale or display rather than one that is produced in response to a commercial commission".
- "Fine art photography": "The production of images to fulfill the creative vision of a photographer. ... Synonymous with art photography".
- "Art photography": A definition "is elusive," but "when photographers refer to it, they have in mind the photographs seen in magazines such as American Photo, Popular Photography, and Print, and in salons and exhibitions. Art (or artful) photography is salable.".
- "Artistic photography": "A frequently used but somewhat vague term. The idea underlying it is that the producer of a given picture has aimed at something more than a merely realistic rendering of the subject, and has attempted to convey a personal impression".
- "Fine art photography": Also called "decor photography," or "photo decor," this "involves selling large photos... that can be used as wall art".

=== In scholarly articles ===
Among the definitions that can be found in scholarly articles are:

- In 1961, S. D. Jouhar founded the Photographic Fine Art Association, and he was its chairman. Their definition of Fine Art was "Creating images that evoke emotion by a photographic process in which one's mind and imagination are freely but competently exercised."
- Two studies by Christopherson in 1974 defined "fine art photographers" as "those persons who create and distribute photographs specifically as 'art.'"
- A 1986 ethnographic and historical study by Schwartz did not directly define "fine art photography" but did compare it with "camera club photography". It found that fine art photography "is tied to other media" such as painting; "responds to its own history and traditions" (as opposed to "aspir[ing] to the same achievements made by their predecessors"); "has its own vocabulary"; "conveys ideas" (e.g., "concern with form supersedes concern with subject matter"); "is innovative"; "is personal"; "is a lifestyle"; and "participates in the world of commerce."

=== On the World Wide Web ===
Among the definitions that can be found on the World Wide Web are:

- The Library of Congress Subject Headings use "art photography" as "photography of art," and "artistic photography" (i.e., "Photography, artistic") as "photography as a fine art, including aesthetic theory".
- The Art & Architecture Thesaurus states that "fine art photography" (preferred term) or "art photography" or "artistic photography" is "the movement in England and the United States, from around 1890 into the early 20th century, which promoted various aesthetic approaches. Historically, has sometimes been applied to any photography whose intention is aesthetic, as distinguished from scientific, commercial, or journalistic; for this meaning, use 'photography'".
- Definitions of "fine art photography" on photographers' static Web pages vary from "the subset of fine art that is created with a camera" to "limited-reproduction photography, using materials and techniques that will outlive the artist".
- On the concept of limited-reproduction, in the French legal system, there is a very precise legal definition regarding fine art photography being considered as an artwork. The tax code states they, "are considered as artworks the photographs taken by the artist, printed by him/herself or under his/her control, signed and numbered in maximum thirty copies, including all sizes and mountings."

== See also ==
- Conceptual photography
- Black and White Photography
- Fine-art nude photography
- List of most expensive photographs
- List of photographers
- List of photographs considered the most important
- Pictorialism
- Tableau vivant
