= Klaus Pannenbaecker =

German engineer

Klaus G. Pannenbaecker (born 1935) is a German engineer, managing director, and teacher in project management. He is known as president of the International Project Management Association from 1994 to 1996.

== Life and work ==
Pannenbaecker attended the Gymnasium up to the 10th grade. He received vocational training as a heavy-current electrician and graduated with distinction. In 1959 he obtained his engineering degree from the Dortmund University of Applied Sciences and Arts. Later in 1994 he also obtained a European Engineer degree in Industrial Engineering.

In 1959 Pannenbaecker started his career at Siemens in planning and cost accounting for the construction of industrial plants in Germany and abroad. From 1969 to 1981 he founded and directed a project management office at Kraftwerk Union, a daughter company of Siemens and AEG. In 1981 he started his own firm for systems engineering and process management, which he directed until his retirement in 2001. This company developed software to update and synchronise technical documentation, and implemented project management in the fields of plant engineering and operations plant operation.

From 1994 to 1996 Pannenbaecker was president of the International Project Management Association as successor of the Danish Morten Fangel, and was succeeded by Gilles Caupin from France.

== Selected publications ==
- Pannenbäcker, Klaus. "Implementation of project management systems." International Journal of Project Management 3.2 (1985): 81-93.
- Pannenbäcker, Klaus. "Joint Project Management Companies." Managing and Modelling Complex Projects. Springer Netherlands, 1997. 167-172.
- Caupin, G., Knöpfel, H., Koch, G., Pannenbäcker, K., Pérez-Polo, F., & Seabury, C. (2004). Comparison between ICB and other project management standards. Bilbao: ICB Revision Project.
- Pannenbäcker, Klaus. "12 Projektmanagement-Kompetenz in projektorientierten Unternehmen." Wege zum projektorientierten Unternehmen (2013): 252.
