= Paul-Jürgen Weber =

German photographer

Paul-Jürgen Weber (born 1942) is a Cologne, Germany-based visual artist and photographer.

== Life and intention ==
Born in Cologne, Germany, Weber started in 1968 his artwork initially with paintings and assemblage sculptures. Since the 1980s he attended primarily to photographic artwork, which bases upon the world's visible reality as it is. His particular feature is to discover, select and process the intrinsic essence from the huge diversity and variety of existing forms and substances to be converted into creative artwork. Only a different view on even well known items is able yet to provoke this specific quality. Wilfried Wiegand calls that the 'detected' beauty, which has been already existing but has to be reminded again. Weber feels particular photographic reference to Ansel Adams, Harald Mante plus Bernd and Hilla Becher. Up to know the photo works are preferentially focused on landscapes in a broad meaning, that is to say „natural finished" as even „man-made“ environments.

== Work ==
- 2015 Solo exhibition "Zweitsichten - Einsichten" with 60 photographic works, gallery p77a, Brühl/Rheinland. Art magazine “be.art”, heading 'Best Ultimate Artist', review of art critic Beatrice Chassepot, Los Angeles. Exhibition at „Colorida Art Gallery“, Lisbon/Portugal, with a selection of 10 works of the series „Volcanic Textures“.
- 2014 Artworks from the series „Stone And Water“ and „Of the Tree's Yearning For The Sea“ on volume „Art Unlimited – 101 Contemporary Artists“. Almanac "International Contemporary Artists, Vol. VIII", New York City, with items "Perspective At Cologne" and "Vilja Forest Maid". „Show de Bola“, Brazil, São Paulo, Rio de Janeiro and Piracicaba with works „Fern Lady“, „Mr. Blue“ and „Tribute to Lyonel F“. Gallery Ventitre01, Rome, Italy, Catalog 2014 with „Wahiba Sands #13“ and „Wadi al-Haylah #1“.
- 2013 Hidden treasure Art Magazine Yearbook 2014 with works „Nova Scotia Living # 12“ and „Andalusian Almond Trees # 5“.
- 2012 Almanac "International Contemporary Artists, Vol. V", New York City, with items "YelloPond #8" and "WahibaSands #13".
- 2011 Series "Wood.1" and "Wood.2". Arts auction "Peinture moderne et contemporaine sculptures et photographies" in Paris, France, with items "Sandpiper" and "Pacific Cedar 2". FRAISSE & JABOT, January 13.
- 2010 Presentation in arts magazine „Artlas“, release No. IV. Illustrated book "Rheinau-Quartier, Hafenkonversion in Köln". Photo work "Wahiba Sands 11", elected No.3 of top 12 photographs USA, February 2010.
- 2009 Photo work "Der ganze Kölnturm", winner photo published in 2010 in KölnTurm calendar. Project "Luxemburger", photo edition of 30 items. Project "Bahnhof Köln Süd", 11 photographs and accompanying text, as booklet as well.
- 2008 Series „Optische Botschaften entlang der Luxemburger Straße in Köln", priced edition of 31 photographs. Project „Rheinauhafen“, photo edition, 26 items.
- 2007 Project „Granite“, Photo edition, 12 items. Project „Of Tree's Yearning for the Sea“, photo edition, 16 items.
- 2006 Exhibition „Baustelle Rheinauhafen Köln“, ArcLinea Cologne, Passagen 2006, 4 photographs. Project „Port Vendres“, photo edition, 14 items. Project „Grands Causses“, photo edition, 12 items. Project „Escalante Area“, photo edition, 12 items.
- 2005 Exhibition „Köln und Mailand“, ArcLinea Cologne, Passagen 2005, 3 photographs. Project „RhineTime“, photo edition, 13 photographs. Project „CologneMagic“, photo edition, 14 items. Project „Sicilia Incantevola“, photo edition, 12 photographs. Project „Arte Agraria“, photo edition, 12 items.
- 2004 Exhibition „Von Köln und kargen Küsten“, GRS Cologne, 50 photographs. Project „CologneBlues“, photo edition, 14 photographs.

== Books ==
- Art Unlimited – 101 Contemporary Artists, p. 146-147 (2014) ISBN 978-91-89685-28-4
- International Contemporary Artists Vol.8, p. 396 (2014) ISBN 978-6-1880007-4-2
- Hidden Treasure Art Magazine Yearbook 2014, p. 240 (2014) ISBN 978-0-9928106-0-3
- International Contemporary Artists Vol.5, p. 321 (2012) ISBN 978-6-1880007-1-1
