= Chemigram =

Form of art made by painting with chemicals

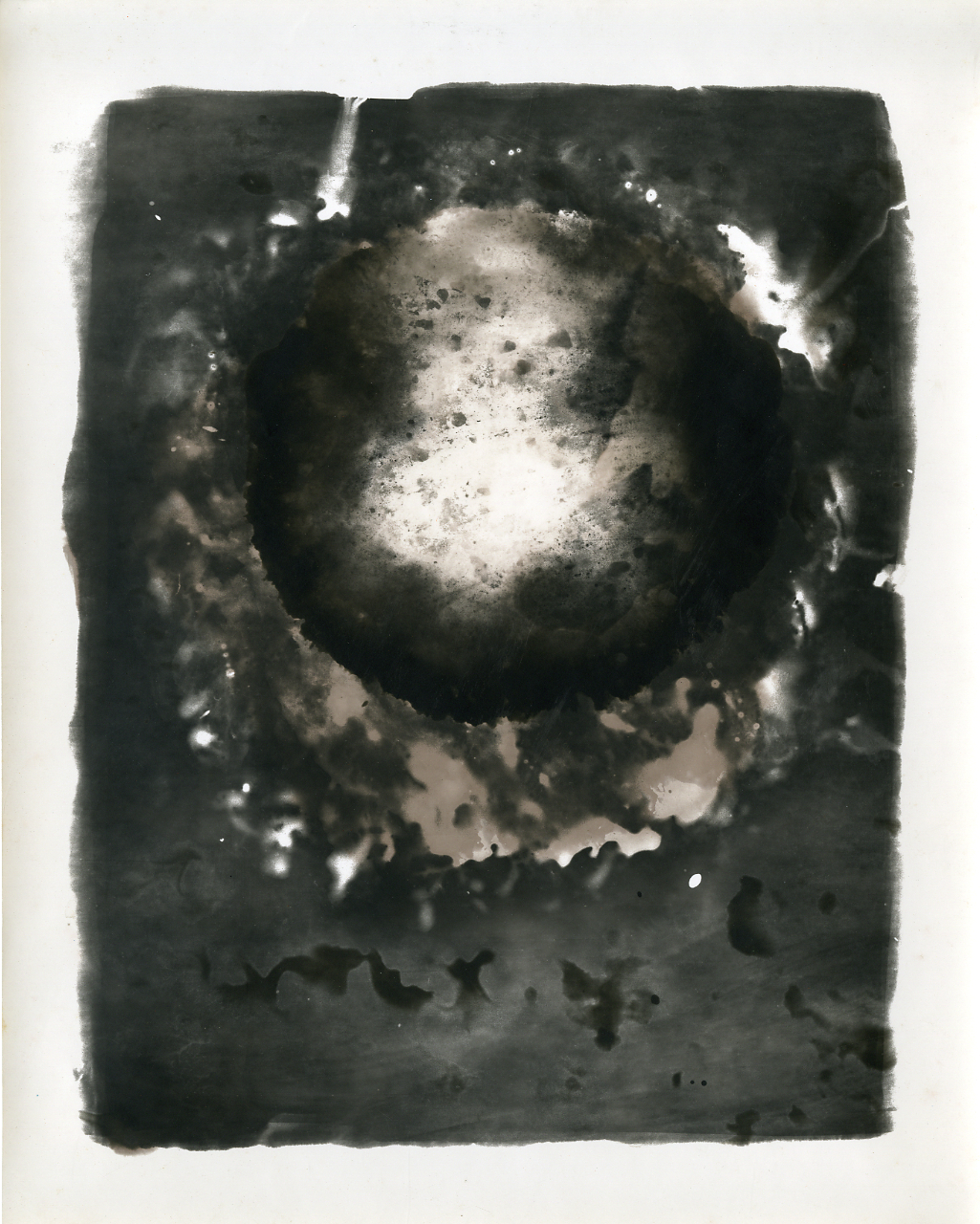
Paolo Monti, 1970

A chemigram is an experimental piece of art where an image is made by painting with chemicals on light-sensitive photographic paper. It combines the materials of painting, such as varnish, wax and oil, with those of photography, such as light-sensitive emulsion, developer and fixer, and is made in full light, without a camera or enlarger. Although it is a camera-less technique, a chemigram is neither a photograph nor a photogram; nor is it a print, since no negative or printing plate is used and each result is unique.

The term chemigram was coined in the 1950s by Belgian artist Pierre Cordier.

== History ==
Johann Schulze was the first person to obtain an image by the deliberate exposure and experimentation of light-sensitive materials; in 1725, he obscured the outside of a bottle of silver salts with paper cut into stencils, leaving behind a darkened image. Hippolyte Bayard produced another chemigram-like image during sensitization tests he conducted in 1839.

In the 1930s and 1940s, Edmund Kesting in Germany and Maurice Tabard in France produced pictures by painting with developer and fixer on photographic paper. It is the Belgian artist Pierre Cordier (born 1933), however, who was most responsible for developing and exploring chemigrams. From his early days, in 1956, he was one of its rare practitioners, and contributed to its development by expanding its technical and esthetic possibilities. He adopted the name chimigramme in French in 1958 (chemigram in English), the most widely accepted designation today.

In 1974 Josef H. Neumann advanced the process in his "chemograms" by incorporating photographed elements before applying chemicals.

== Process ==
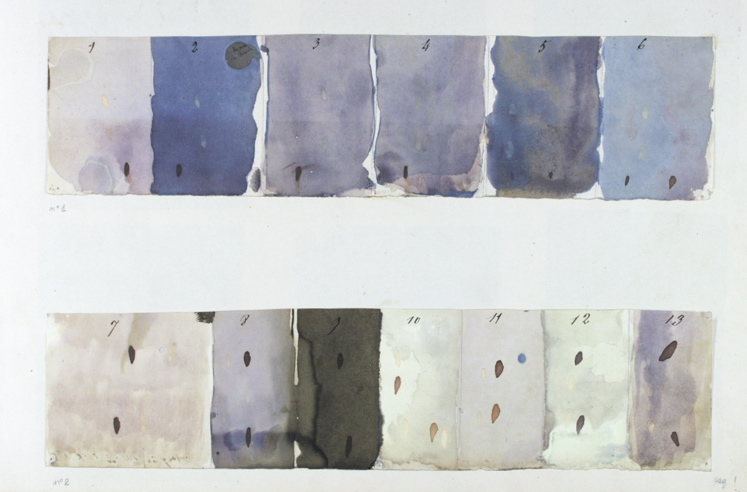
First page of the Bayard album, photosensitization test, 1839, collection of the Société française de photographie

A chemigram is made by painting with chemicals on photographic paper and lies within the general domain of experimentation in the visual arts. It requires the use of materials from silver halide-based photography (light-sensitive paper, developer, and fixer), but it is not a photograph. Like the photogram, the chemigram is made without a camera, yet it is created in full light instead of in the darkness of the darkroom. For this reason it is not "light that writes" (photo graphein in the Greek) but rather "chemistry that writes".

Chemigrams can be made solely with photo paper, developer, and fixer, with results that will somewhat resemble watercolor. In Cordier's work the image often results from the reactions of successive layers after the paper has been dipped repeatedly in developer and fixer. The possibilities can be multiplied by using materials from painting (such as varnish, wax, or oil). These kinds of experiments are akin to those of Paul Klee, Max Ernst, and Antoni Tàpies.

In contrast to chemigrams, the production of chemograms consists of two different steps. First an enlarger is used to partly or fully expose a photographic image onto photographic paper in the darkroom and thereafter the images are processed with chemicals under full light.

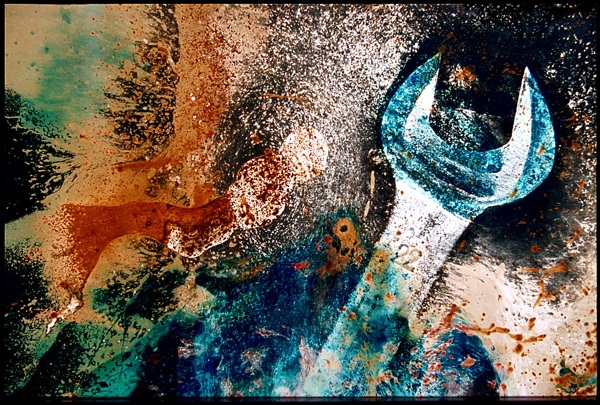
Josef H. Neumann Chemogramm *Traumarbeit* (1976)
