= Kodachrome (disambiguation) =

Kodachrome was a brand of color transparency film sold by Kodak.

Kodachrome may also refer to:

- "Kodachrome", a song by Paul Simon from his 1973 album There Goes Rhymin' Simon
- Kodachrome (motion picture film), a 2017 American drama film
- Kodachrome Basin State Park in Utah
- The color scheme of the Southern Pacific–Santa Fe Railroad

== See also ==
- Kodacolor (disambiguation)
