= S. D. Jouhar =

Photographer (1901–1963)

S.D. Jouhar
- Born: Sartaj Deen Jouhar; 20 January 1901; Amritsar, British Raj
- Died: April 1963 (aged 61–62)
- Occupation: Photographer
- Years active: 1935–1963
- Website: www.sdjouhar.com

Sartaj Deen Jouhar (1901–1963) was an English medical doctor and amateur Fine Art photographer, active in the period 1935 to 1963.

== Biography ==
He was born in Amritsar in 1901 and came to England around 1923 to study medicine. He qualified in 1931, and after spending a few years in the North-East, running a General Practice in Byers Green, he moved South in 1936 to take over a medical practice at Orleans Lodge, Twickenham.

== Work ==
He was a leading member of the Leica Postal Portfolio which started in 1936, and in 1938 he was a founder member and the first president of the resuscitated Twickenham Photographic Society. Other founder members included John Bardsley, who was president of the RPS (1960-1962) and who wrote Jouhar's obituary in the RPS Photographic Journal in June 1963. "The Doctor" (as he was known in photographic circles) became a member of the Royal Photographic Society in 1938 and achieved his associateship in 1939 and his fellowship in 1940. From 1944, until his death in 1963, he served on its council and was the honorary secretary of the Pictorial Group between 1944 and 1950 and later its chairman. In 1944, he was elected a member of the London Salon of Photography.

In 1948 and 1950, he was chairman and organiser of the World Photographic Arts Exhibition held in Twickenham. His picture called "Madrasi Fishermen" (taken on a trip to India in 1959) was the first colour print to be acquired by the Tyng Collection of the Royal Photographic Society In August 1961 he formed the Photographic Fine Art Association, and he was its chairman. Appointed as secretary was Louis Demolin and as treasurer W M Marynowicz. The Advisory Committee included Hubert Davey, Dennis Gasser, S K Matthews and Bertram Sinkinson OBE. Their inaugural exhibition was held at The Royal Festival Hall in London in November 1961.

He died in April 1963, shortly before he was due to undertake a 3-month lecture tour of the US with a talk entitled "Colour Photography as a Fine Art".

== Works ==
- Composition (The Photographic Journal - April 1945)
- A Guide to Print Analysis (The Photographic Journal - March 1947)
- Some Thoughts on Pictorialism (The Photographic Journal - Aug 1948)
- The Miniature versus Larger Cameras(February 1950)
- Figure Photography (The Photographic Journal - October 1951)
- Photographic Personalities: James Jarché (The Amateur Photographer, 17 December 1952, p. 635)
- Exhibition Photography (The Photographic Journal - September 1954)
- Jouhar on 35mm Picture Making (Fountain Press, 1955)
- Creating with Polarized Light (Photographic Society of America Journal, April 1963)
