= Josef H. Neumann =

German photographer

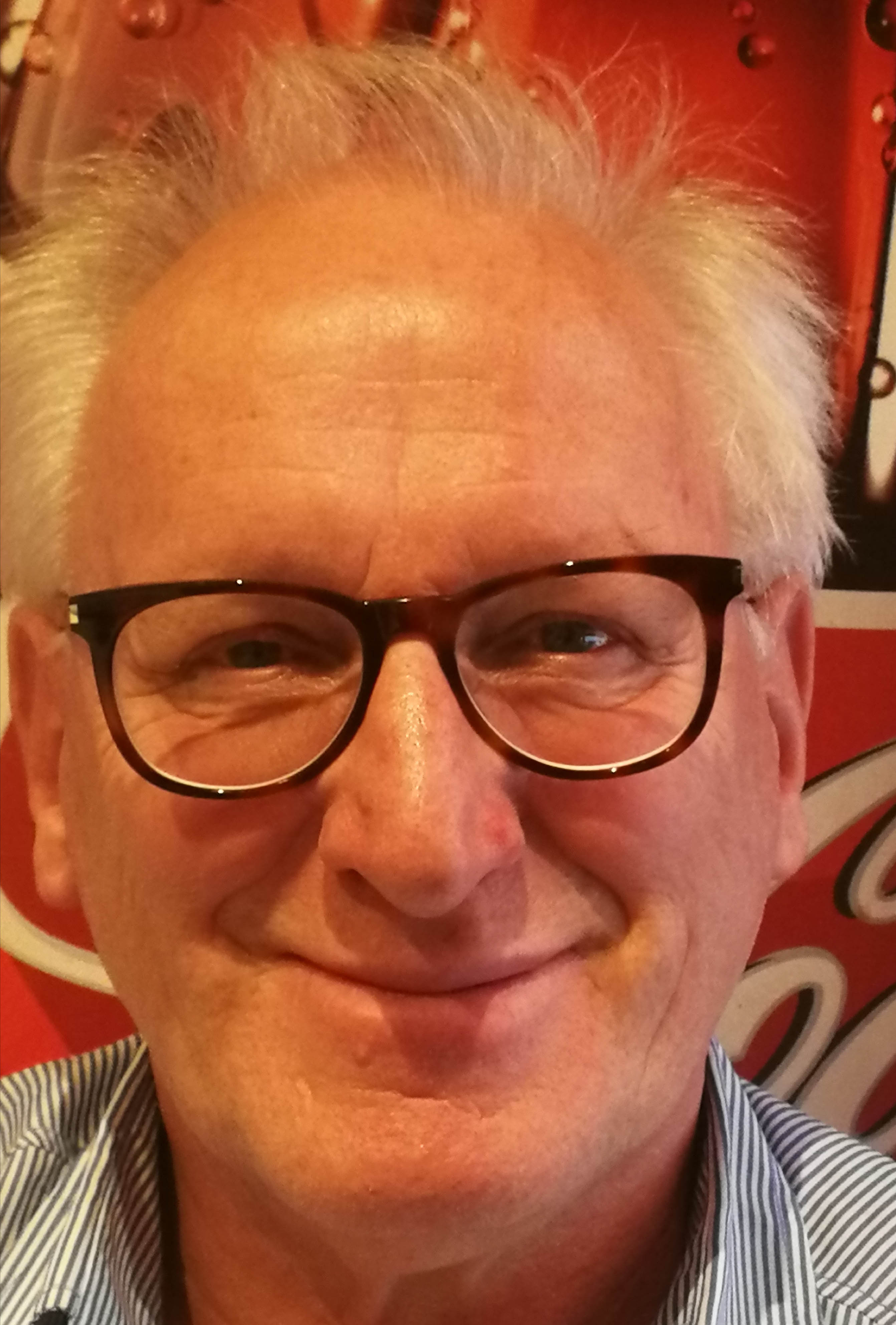
Josef H. Neumann

Josef H. Neumann (born May 27, 1953) is a German Art Photographer, media designer and art historian. He invented the chemogram, an experimental artform involving manipulating chemicals in film photography.

== Life ==
=== Education ===
Josef H. Neumann completed an apprenticeship as a photographer under Gustav Wenningin his birthplace of Rheine in Westphalia from 1967 to 1970. From 1974 to 1978 he studied visual communication at the Dortmund University of Applied Sciences under Professors Pan Walther (photographer) and Adolf Clemens (photojournalist). After completing his diploma as a photo designer under Professor Harald Mante (photo designer) in the Department of Photography/Film Design (1979), he completed his studies in journalism, philosophy and art history at the Westphalian Wilhelms University in Münster with an intermediate diploma in 1984 under Professors Winfried B. Lerg (publicist), Hans Blumenberg (philosopher) and Georg Kauffmann (art historian).

Neumann married in 1991 the teacher and kindergarten director Martina Flügel. The marriage was dissolved in the year of 2003. He is married with the Physiotherapista and Venezuelana Verónica Cristina López Pérez, since March 27, 2020 in Moche, Trujillo, Peru. They live separately since 2022 in Santiago de Chile and Dortmund, Germany.

=== Artistic work ===
Since 1979 Neumann lectured at intervals at the Dortmund University of Applied Sciences and Arts in the fields photo design and social work. He also had an assignment for Designing with Electronic Media ("Gestaltung mit elektronischen Medien") with the department of computer science of the Dortmund University of Applied Sciences and Arts for 20 years.

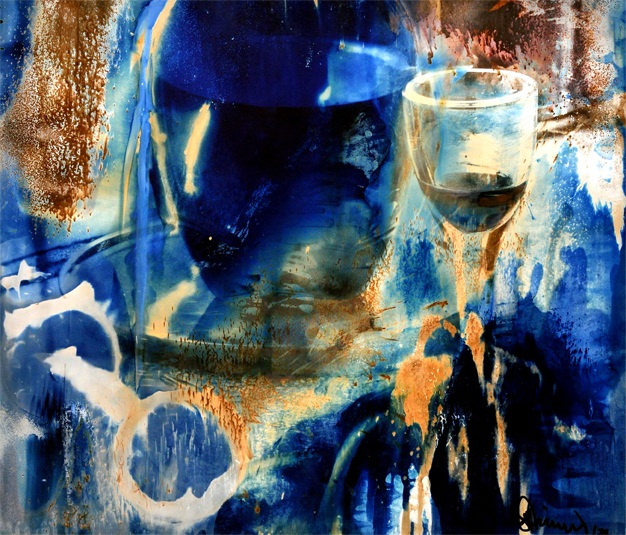
Chemogram Gustav I by Josef H. Neumann, 1976

Since 1986 Neumann photographed for various publishing houses in Germany, Austria, France and Switzerland. Neumann mainly worked for the publisher C. J. Bucher (Munich) while often using the Russian panorama camera Horizont. Several panorama illustrated books were published, including Paris, Vienna, Switzerland, Munich, Germany, Tuscany und Sicily.

His illustrated book Deutschland was awarded twice – in the years 1987 and 1990 – with the Kodak-Fotobuchpreis. In addition, this book has a preface by president Richard von Weizsäcker and was published with an edition of more than 40.000 copies. As the German government has given one copy as a present to each host for several years the book has a worldwide spread.

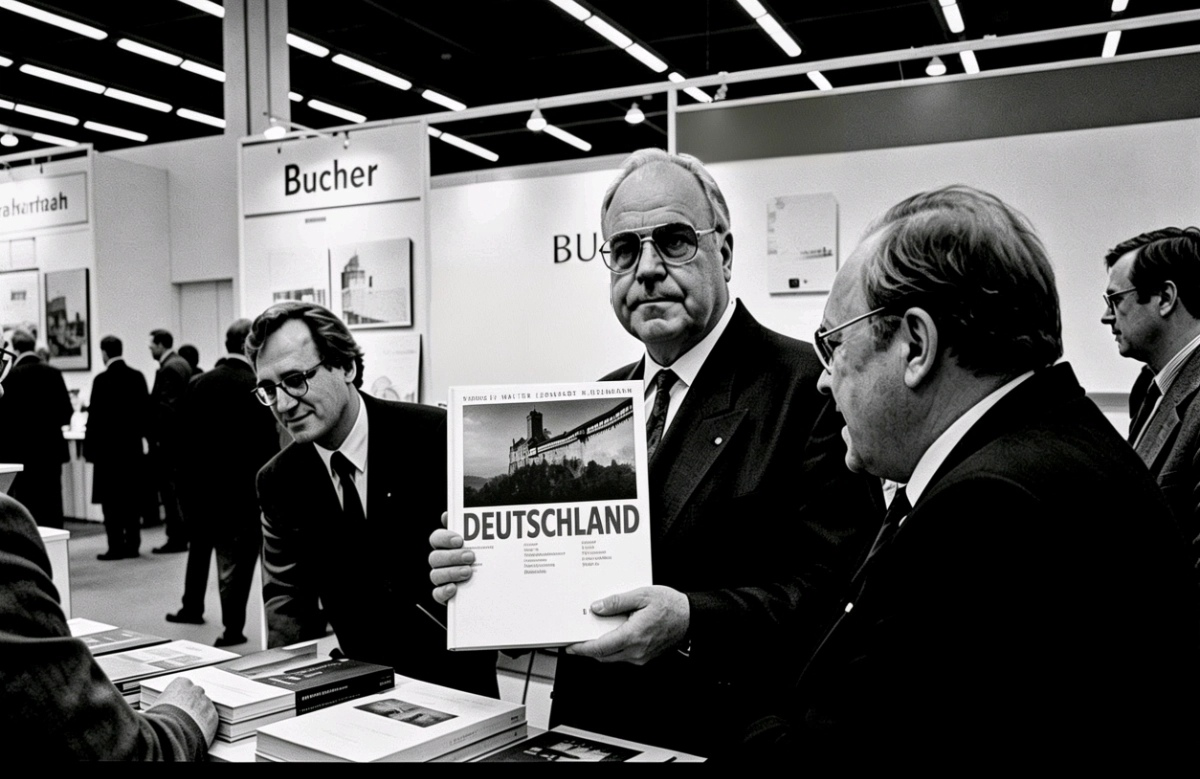
Helmut Kohl Federal Chancellor German Federal Panorama photobook Germany 1990

While having an academic status at the Dortmund University of Applied Sciences and Arts in the department of design from 1986 to 1987 Neumann wrote two standard references Filme kreativ nutzen (Using films creatively) and Objektive kreativ nutzen (Using lenses creatively) together with Harald Mante in 1986 and 1988.

1993 Neumann lectured at the former Fachhochschule Köln (now Technical University of Cologne) in the department of photo engineering.

After intensive and creative research in the new camera generation Zoom-Kompakte his book Zoomkompakte kreativ was published in 1994 on occasion of the 75th anniversary of the Japanese camera company Asahi Optical Joint Stock Co. alias Pentax.

In his hometown of Dortmund, Neumann photographed together with Gerhard P. Müller under the leadership of the text authors Wolfgang Rinke and Dore Bolege-Vieweg for the book titles Dortmund Churches of the Middle Ages and Dortmund Village Churches, two extensive illustrated books on Dortmund church treasures, which were published by Verlag Fr.-W. Ruhfus in 1987 and 1999.

Since 2003 Neumann has artistically worked at intervals in Portugal (Algarve) on photo and video productions.

Josef H. Neumann is a member of the German Society for Photography (DGPh) since 1986th

In January 2012 he opened his atelier INICIO.de together with the Argentinian artist Virginia Novarin in the Unionviertel in Dortmund.

Today Neumann works as freelancing photo designer producing image and product commercials for print and video. In addition Neumann regularly works as lecturer on didactic methods of photography for public institutions and private companies.

Neumann published for all major German photographic journals like Color Foto, Foto, Fotoheft, Fotomagazin, Minolta Mirror, Nikon News, Photo, Photographie, Photo Revue, Professional Camera, ProfiFoto, fineartphotomagazine. His photographs have been used in numerous German and European publications wow Creative Photography, Relais & Châteaux, Brigitte, Natur, Freizeit Revue, S.Fischer Verlag, Suhrkamp Verlag and Time.

=== Editorial work ===
From 1981 to 1996 Neumann was member of the editorial team of the German magazine Photographie in Düsseldorf and Zürich.

At the same time Neumann was chief editor of the German magazine Fotoheft from 1990 to 1992.

=== Research ===
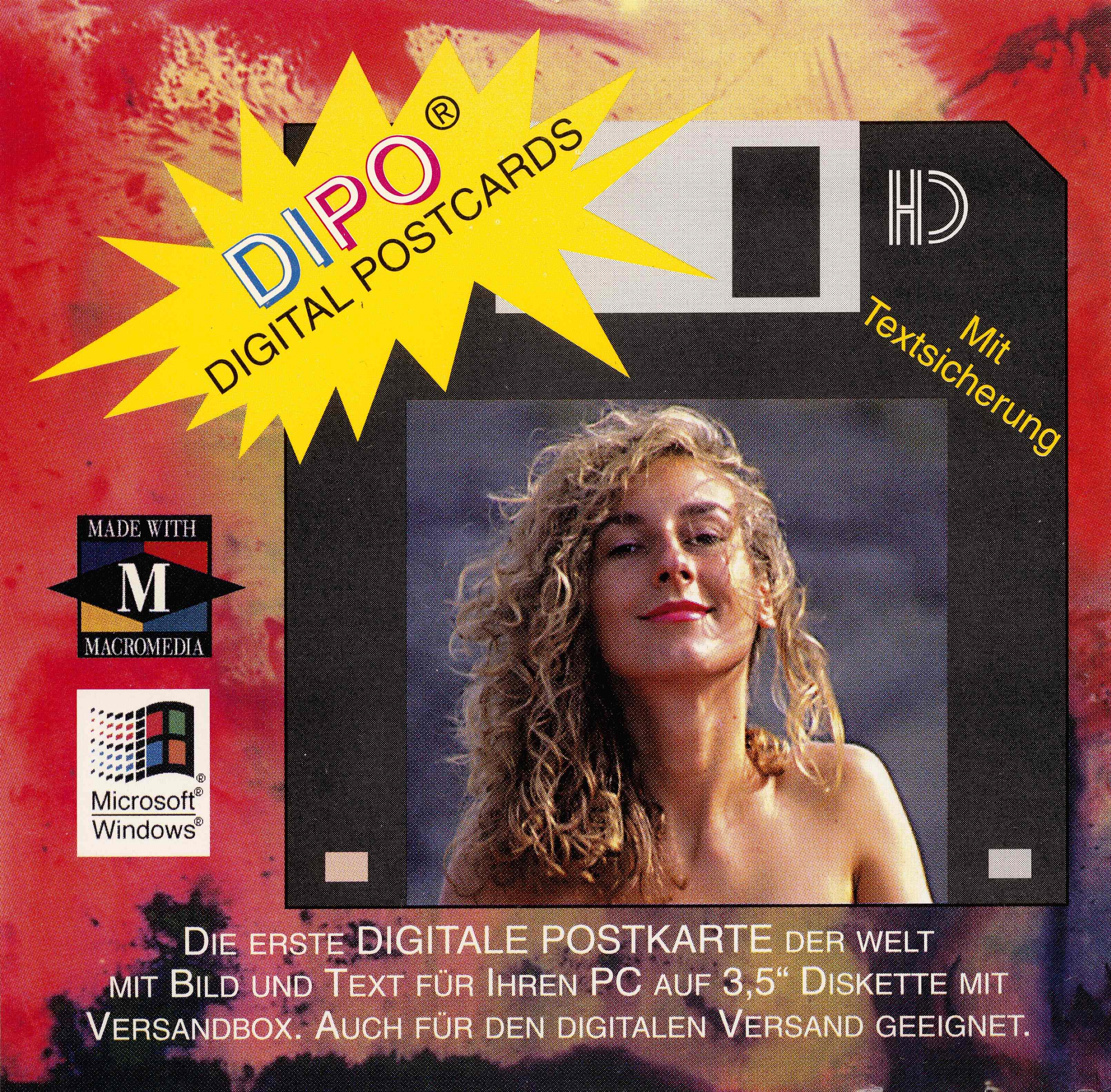
DIPO Digital Postcard, 1993

- 1974: Experimental advancements of Chemigrams to Chemograms, in which photographic images are first processed onto photographic paper and then chemicals are additionally applied onto it
- 1976: First successful tests in producing "edible photo prints" using screen printing and coinage of the term

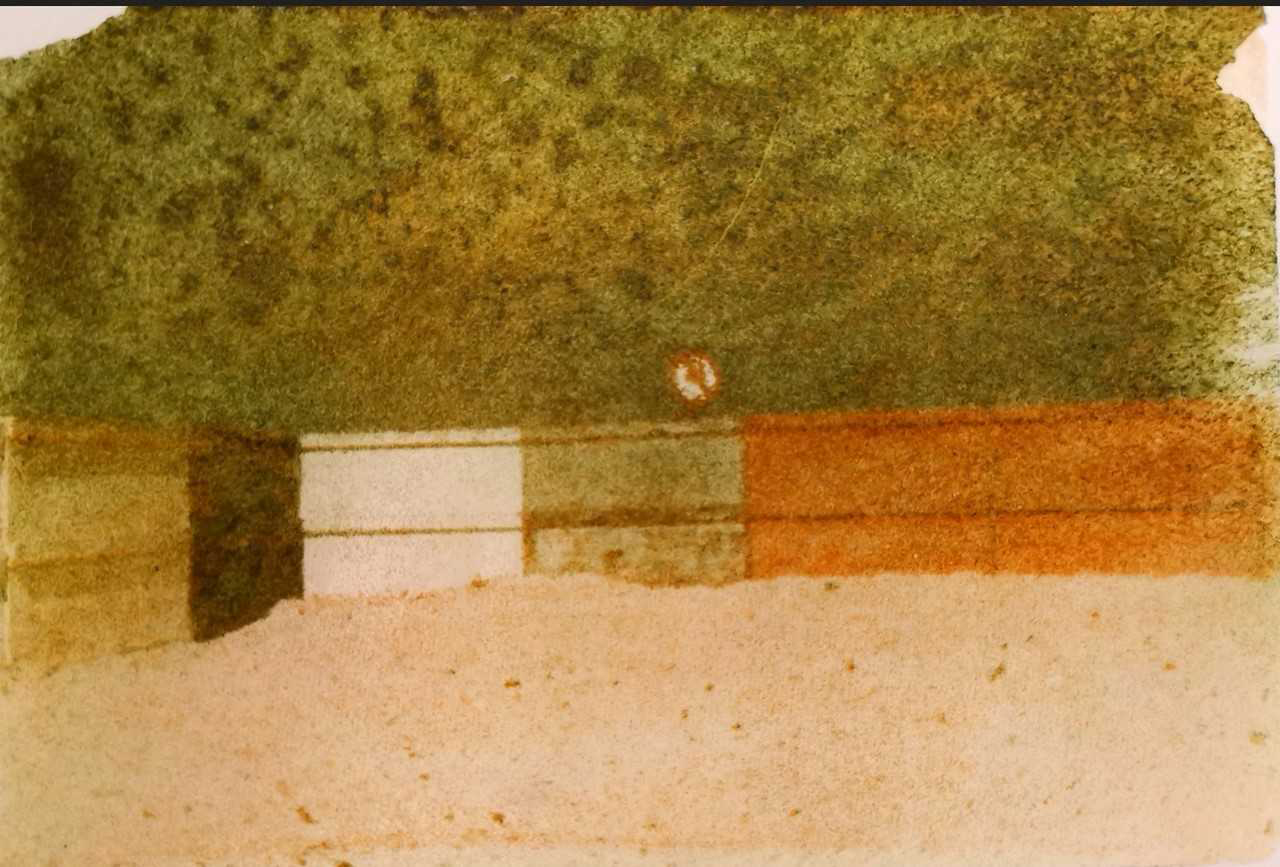
The world's first edible photo on wafer via screen printing using colored honey and approved food coloring

1998: Completion of research (begun in 1976) regarding the production of "edible photo prints" using piezotechnology and food colors.

- 1992: Foundation of the company FOTOMeDIA and research with focus on electronic processing of pictures for multimedia projects.
- 1993: DIPO DIGITAL POSTCARD Development, registration at the DPMA and marketing of the first DIPO DIGITAL POSTCARD on disk

As part of his teaching activities at the Dortmund University of Applied Sciences, Department of Design, in the years 1981-1986 and the Dortmund University of Applied Sciences, Department of General Computer Science, from winter semester 1996 to today, summer semester 2025, in the subject *Design with electronic media*, Josef H. Neumann opened in December 2000 with his students, led by Stephan Rosegger, within a Pilot project, in cooperation with the engineering company ICN.de, the first Internet Gallery on the World Wide Web.

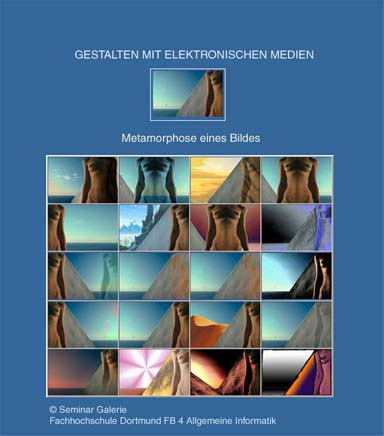
First Internet Gallery 2000

== Publications ==
=== Illustrated books ===
- Sizilien. C. J. Bucher Verlag, Lucerne/Munich 2001, ISBN 978-3-765812-98-9
- Wien. C. J. Bucher Verlag, Lucerne/Munich 1989, ISBN 978-3-765806-44-5
- München. C. J. Bucher Verlag, Lucerne/Munich 1987, ISBN 978-3-765805-19-6
- Der Harz. C. J. Bucher Verlag, Lucerne/Munich 1986, ISBN 978-3-765804-68-7
- Deutschland. C. J. Bucher Verlag, Lucerne/Munich 1986, ISBN 978-3-765806-60-5 Ausgezeichnet mit dem »Kodak Fotobuchpreis« 1987 und 1990
- Paris. C. J. Bucher Verlag, Lucerne/Munich 1986, ISBN 978-3-765805-36-3
- Schweiz. Suisse. Svizzera. C. J. Bucher Verlag, Lucerne/Munich 1986, ISBN 978-3-765805-79-0
- Mit Lust und Laune durch den Märkischen Kreis. Lüdenscheid 2001, ISBN 978-3-883632-21-6
- Dortmunder Dorfkirchen. (co-authors Dore Boleg-Vieweg, Gerhard P. Müller), Verlag Ruhfus Dortmund 1998 ISBN 978-3793250-32-6
- Toskana. (co-authors Gerhard P. Müller, Axel M. Mosler, Martin Thomas) C. J. Bucher Verlag, Lucerne/Munich 1986, ISBN 978-3765812-53-8
- Dortmunder Kirchen des Mittelalters. (co-authors Wolfgang Rinke, Gerhard P. Müller,), Verlag Ruhfus Dortmund 1986 ISBN 978-3-793250-31-9
- Dortmunder Bilder und Gedanken. (co-authors Jutta Ohrmann, Dieter Menne, Gerhard P. Müller), Verlag Ruhfus Dortmund 1986 ISBN 978-3-793241-31-7

=== Educational books on photography ===
- Zoomkompakte kreativ. Verlag Photographie, Schaffhausen 1994, ISBN 978-3-723100-40-0
- Filme kreativ nutzen. (co-author Harald Mante), Verlag Photographie, Schaffhausen 1988, ISBN 978-3-723176-00-9
- Objektive kreativ nutzen. (co-author Harald Mante), Verlag Photographie, Schaffhausen 1986, ISBN 978-3-723164-00-6

=== Exhibitions ===
- 2018 Chemogramm – Josef H. Neumann, Museo de Arte Moderno, Bucaramanga (Colombia)
- 1989 Paris – Panorama Galerie Nikkor Club, Gladbeck
- 1989 „Blow Up," Farblaserkopien, Cafe Einstein, Dortmund
- 1979 „Landschaft und Figur" Galerie Studio Freund/Sommer, Iserlohn
- 1978 Chemogramme Galerie Keller-Holtz, Rheda Wiedenbrück
- 1978 Chemogramme Galerie Stiegemann/Patzelt, Siegburg
- 1977 Chemogramme Galerie Wendland. Jun., Schüttorf
- 1976 Chemogramme und Fotoobjekte, Stadtsparkasse Rheine
- 1976 Chemogramme Fotografik-Studio-Galerie Professor Pan Walther, Münster

=== Group exhibitions ===
- 2021 Grafik aus Dortmund DEPOT, Dortmund
- 2016 Einblicke Torhaus Rombergpark, Dortmund
- 2016 Grafik aus Dortmund Berswordthalle, Dortmund
- 2015 Einblicke Torhaus Rombergpark, Dortmund
- 2015 Grafik aus Dortmund Berswordthalle, Dortmund
- 2012 „Atelier Inicio" Dortmund, mit Virginia Novarin, Zeichnungen und Chemogramme, Dortmund
- 1986 Stadtmuseum München
- 1985 Kurhaus FüssenKunstausstellung Amnesty International
- 1978 Landesbildstelle Bremen, Harald Mante und Studenten
- 1978 Bildstelle des Landes Baden-Württemberg, Stuttgart
- 1978 Höhere Graphische Lehr-und Versuchsanstalt, Wien
- 1978 Photo-Expo-Metro, Exhibition, Paris
- 1978 Folkwang Museum Essen, Otto Steinert Preis "Figur und Landschaft"
- 1978 Photokina Cologne in: German Society for Photography

=== Awards ===
- 2016 Kunstankauf Stadt Dortmund (Chemogram, Print Alentejo, Portugal)
- 2015 Kunstankauf Stadt Dortmund (Chemograms;Prints Phoenix I and Phoenix II)
- 2000 EXPO 2000 Hannover. Presentation and Qualification of the awarded several times Panoramaworks GERMANY in the Stand of the German Delegation.
- 1990 Kodak Fotobuchpreis für den Titel Deutschland.
- 1988 Kodak Fotobuchpreis für den Titel "Filme kreativ nutzen"

mit Co Autor Harald Mante

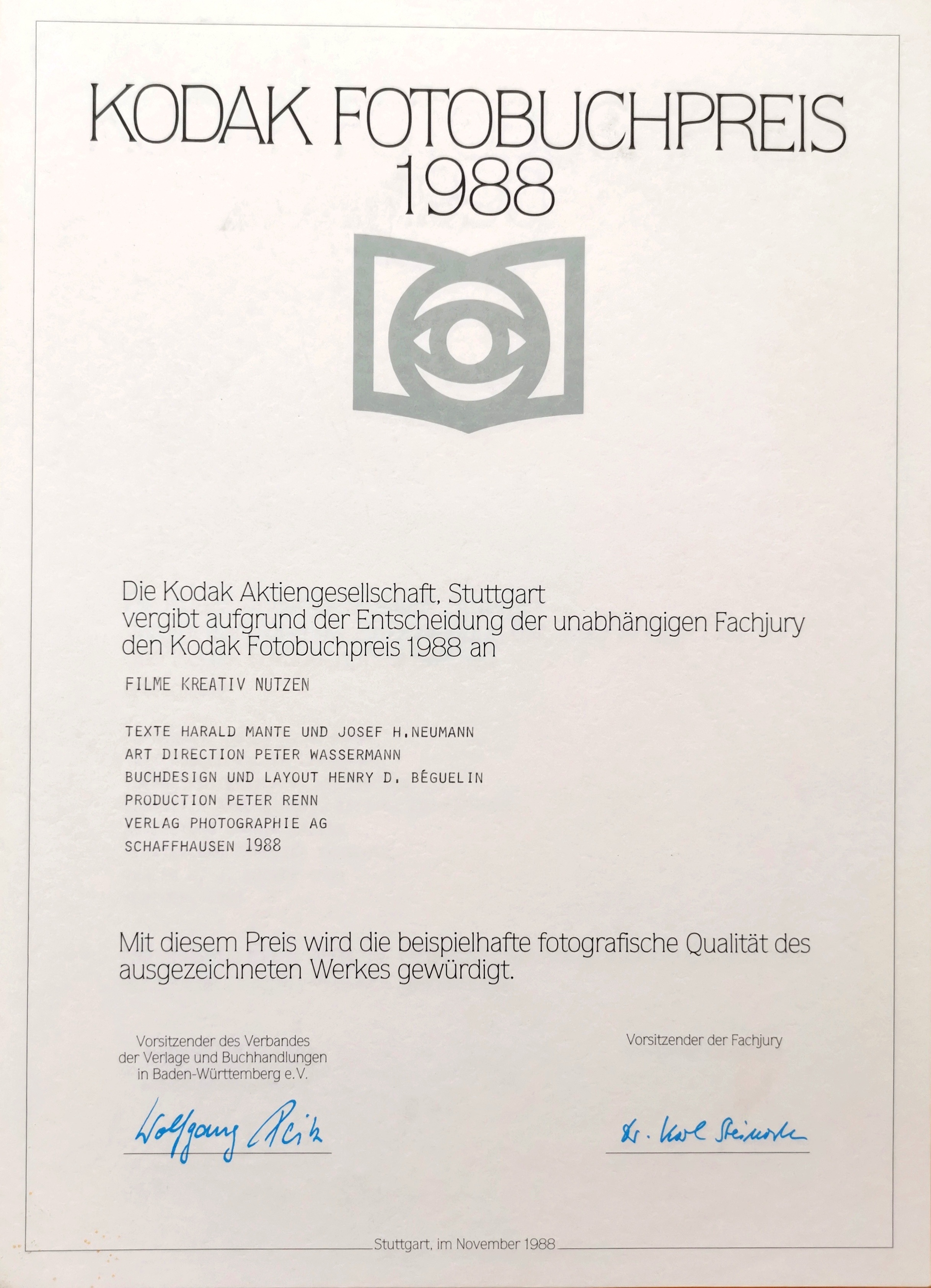
KODAK Fotobuchpreis 1988 PHOTOGRAPHIE *Filme kreativ nutzen*

- 1987 Kodak Fotobuchpreis für den Titel Bundesrepublik Deutschland.
- 1981/82 Nikon-Contest International 2. Preis, Düsseldorf
- 1979 Newcomer-Award PROFESSIONAL CAMERA 2. Preis, Munich
- 1978 Otto Steinert Preis Honorable Mention "Figur und Landschaft", Folkwang Museum Essen
- 1978 Photo-Expo-Metro Concurso Honorable Mention Paris
- 1978 Photokina Cologne in: German Society for Photography
- 1977/78 Nikon-Contest International 3. Preis, Düsseldorf
