= Kodacolor Technology =

Kodak inkjet tech brand

Kodacolor Technology is a Kodak-owned brand used to collectively market several of its inkjet printing technologies. It was announced on February 6, 2007, at the launch of Kodak EasyShare All-in-One Printers.

Kodacolor Technology is protected by United States patent 7,655,083.

In September 2012, Kodak to announced its exit from the consumer inkjet market due to falling sales.
