= Kodacolor =

Kodacolor is a brand-name owned and used by Kodak. In general, it has been used for three technologically distinct purposes:

- Kodacolor Technology is the collective branding used for several proprietary inkjet printer technologies.
- Kodacolor (still photography) includes several "true" color negative (print) films produced by Kodak since 1942.
- Kodacolor (filmmaking) was an early movie system that used filters to record additive color on monochromatic lenticular film.
- Dye coupler negative, also known as Kodacolor negative
