= Harald Mante =

German photographer and designer

- Born: 29 March 1936 (age 90); Berlin
- Known for: Photography

Harald Mante (born 29 March 1936 in Berlin) is a German photographer, artist and designer. Since 1960, Mante had a great influence on the German color photography. He was in the second generation of a Bauhaus student and transformed the ideas of the famous masters of the Bauhaus into photography. His text books on composition and color design are known worldwide.

== Artistic Work ==
Harald Mante received his early education at the Werkkunstschule Wiesbaden, where he took painting classes from Vincent Weber. There, he got first introduced to the ideas of the German Bauhaus. In 1960, he purchased his first camera, financed by delivering newspapers. He successfully participated in several photography contests in Germany. Finally, in 1964, after a three-month trip to Ireland, he decided to turn professional. In the following years, leading magazines such as Stern, Twen, Bild der Zeit and Epoca published his work. In 1969, he published his first books on "Composition and Color Design" which was based on the fundamental principles of color design developed by famous painters such as Kandinsky, Klee and Itten.

In 1971, Harald Mante began teaching at the Gesamthochschule Wuppertal, and went to Dortmund University of Applied Art and Sciences in 1973 where he held a teaching position as full Professor for "Free and Experimental photography".

Mante was invited as visiting professor in 1978 from the University of Saskatchewan (Saskatoon, Canada) and in 1989 from the Rochester Institute of Technology and the Parsons School of Design New York City.

He continued to work as a photographer on a freelance basis throughout his academic career. In these years, his work revolved around themes like "space and time", "reflections", and "self-shadows" and he published numerous books and journal articles.

In 1988, Harald Mante and Eva Witter started a major art project called "Bildräume (Image spaces) – Diaphane Metamorphosen von Schlössern in Europa" a black-and-white photographic work combining exterior and interior spaces of European castles on multiple exposures. In 1993, a second project "Weitsichten" (looking into the distance together) was initiated by the couple.

In 2001, Harald Mante retired from his teaching position in Dortmund, but remained active, both as a fine art photographer and as an educator, teaching classes at the "Altenakademie Dortmund" and at the "European Art Academy" in Trier, as well as numerous workshops and seminars throughout the year.

Harald Mante became a member of the German societies BFF in 1973 and DGPh in 1975.

== Publications ==
Photo books (selection)

- Photography Unplugged (Englisch). Rocky Nook (Santa Barbara, CA, US) 2009, ISBN 978-1-933952-47-5
- Kompositionen (Monographie). Verlag Photographie, Schaffhausen 1987
- Irland. C. J. Bucher Verlag, Luzern/Munich 1986
- Kanada. C. J. Bucher Verlag, Luzern/Munich 1984
- Österreich. C. J. Bucher Verlag, Luzern/Munich 1982
- Toskana-Umbrien. C. J. Bucher Verlag, Luzern/Munich 1981

Photography teaching books (selection)

- Serial Photography – Using Themed Images to Improve Your Photographic Skills. Rocky Nook, 1 edition January 2011, ISBN 978-1-933952-73-4
- The Photograph – Composition and Color Design. Rocky Nook, 1 edition 2008, ISBN 978-1-933952-26-0
- Motive kreativ nutzen. Verlag Photographie, Schaffhausen 1996
- Farbig Sehen und Gestalten. Verlag Photographie, Schaffhausen 1980, ISBN 3-7231-8000-0
- Farb-Design. Otto Maier Verlag, Ravensburg 1970 (Licences in 4 Languages)
- Bildaufbau. Otto Maier Verlag, Ravensburg 1969 (Licences in 5 Languages)

Exhibitions (selection)

- 2001 40 Jahre Fotografie. Medienbunker Dortmund, Germany
- 1987 Farbfotografien. MKK, Dortmund, Germany
- 1986 Venedig. Italienisches Kulturinstitut, Cologne, Germany
- 1982 Farbfotografie und Sequenzen. Galerie St. Johann, Saarbrücken, Germany
- 1978 Serien und Sequenzen. Mendel Art Gallery, Saskatoon, Canada
- 1976 Serien und Sequenzen. Haus der Kunst, Hamburg, Germany
- 1974 Multiple Objekte. Galerie Die Insel, Hamburg, Germany
- 1966 Irland und Portugal. photokina 1966, Cologne, Germany

Group exhibitions (selection)

- 2001 Dortmund forever. MKK, Dortmund, Germany
- 1990 Künstlerische Bierdeckel. Thier-Galerie, Dortmund, Germany
- 1983 4 Schüler von Vincent Weber. Nassauischer Kunstverein, Wiesbaden, Germany
- 1981 Farbe im Photo. Josef-Haubrich-Kunsthalle, Cologne, Germany
- 1977 Sequenzen von Künstlern. Hessisches Landesmuseum, Darmstadt, Germany
- 1973 Multiple Objekte. Cossonay, Laussane, Swiss
- 1968 2. Weltausstellung der Fotografie. Pressehaus Stern, Hamburg, Germany

Exhibition »Bildräume« (Image spaces) together with Eva Witter (selection)

- 2008 Schloßmuseum Bad Pyrmont, Germany
- 2004 Landesmuseum Schloß Oldenburg, Germany
- 1998 Stadtmuseum Münster, Germany
- 1995 Museum für Kunst und Gewerbe, Hamburg, Germany
- 1993 Museum für Photographie, Braunschweig, Germany

== Video ==
Video documentary about Harald Mante's teaching and creative work, produced by the Eastman KODAK Company for its "Techniques of the Masters" broadcast series (April 1989).

== Authority control (Normdaten) ==
VIAF: 54944866
