= Pierre Cordier =

Belgian artist who pioneered technique of painting on photographic paper

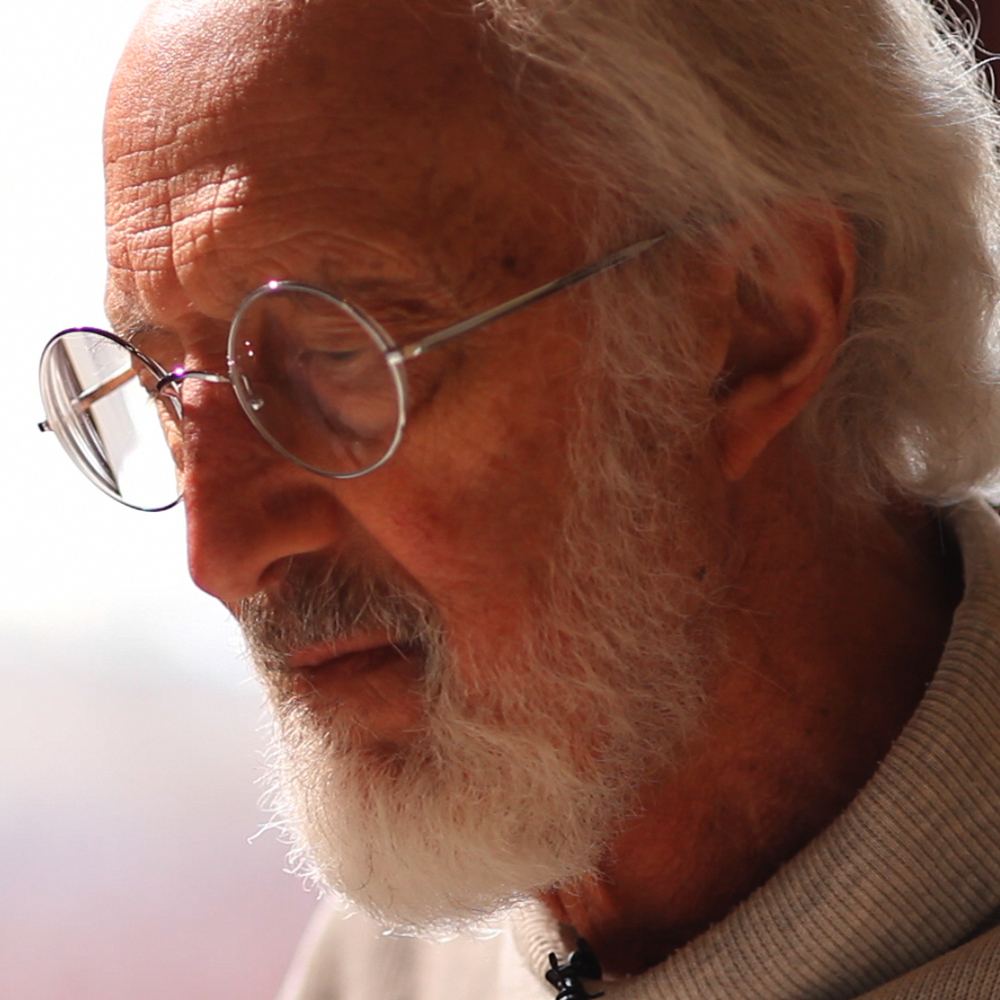
- Born: January 28, 1933; Brussels, Belgium
- Died: March 21, 2024 (aged 91); Brussels, Belgium
- Occupation: artist
- Known for: chemigram

Pierre Cordier (January 28, 1933 – March 21, 2024) was a Belgian artist. He is considered a pioneer of the chemigram and of its development as a means of artistic expression.

== Childhood and education ==
When he was young he became interested in jazz. The improvisational freedom of this music is reflected in his works.

== The chemigram ==
In 1952 he made an important acquaintance: Georges Brassens, the poet and singer, who was unknown at the time. He recorded and photographed him. Brassens left a deep influence on Cordier and encouraged him to continue exploring the "unfrequented steep road" that he had chosen.

After studying political science at the Université Libre de Bruxelles, Cordier completed his military service in Germany in 1956. It was there that a new pathway opened up for him: the chemigram.

On November 10, 1956, writing a dedication with nail polish on photographic paper to a young German woman named Erika, Pierre Cordier discovered what he later called the chemigram. This technique, which "combines the physics of painting (varnish, oil, wax) and the chemistry of photography (photosensitive emulsion, developer, and fixer), without the use of a camera or enlarger, and in full light", became for him a source of experiments and a plastic language. It opened up a new visual space at the boundaries of painting, photography, and writing, allowing him "to create entrancing images impossible to realize by any other means. Working like a painter, he replaces the canvas with photographic paper." Alongside his visual research, he continued in his career as a professional photographer, finally abandoning it in 1967. Several important figures in the arts became interested in these new visual possibilities, among them Otto Steinert (1915–1978), professor and founder of the Subjektive Fotografie movement. Thanks to his encouragement, Cordier produced many chemigrams as well as photographic self-portraits. These works were exhibited in 1958 during the Subjektive Fotografie 3 exhibition in Cologne.

== The years 1970, 1980 and 2000 ==
From the 1960s until the mid-1970s Cordier continued his experiments: chromatic research (1961), the photo-chemigram (1963), and magical varnish (1972). He also produced some experimental films and became a lecturer at the École nationale des arts visuels in Brussels from 1965 to 1998. At a time when artistic photography was not really accepted in Europe, the exhibition he had (with Denis Brihat and Jean-Pierre Sudre) at the Museum of Modern Art in New York City in 1967 was a major event. The next year he was one of the founders, with Gottfried Jäger, of the Generative Fotografie movement in Germany. His meeting with Aaron Siskind in 1977 was crucial: this great American photographer became his spiritual father and introduced him to many important figures in the New Bauhaus circle of Chicago.

The end of the seventies was an especially fruitful period of exhibits and contacts, and also marked his technical mastery of the chemigram technique. The year 1988 was emblematic of this maturity, with a retrospective of the artist's work at the Museum of Fine Arts of Belgium, Brussels, the creation of a monumental piece for the Brussels subway, and his induction into the Académie royale de Belgique. He resided in the south of France from 1992 to 2007, gathering material for the publication of a monograph which synthesizes fifty years of research. Since its publication in 2007, the Centre Pompidou in Paris and the Victoria & Albert Museum in London have each acquired five chemigrams for their collections. Those at the Victoria and Albert Museum were on view from October 2010 until February 2011.

Arising from hybrid techniques, the work of Pierre Cordier has always been difficult to classify, and raises the question of affiliation from an art-historical point of view. Yet an authentic personal mythology emerges, whose indecipherable language would be key to providing the answer.

== Bibliography ==
- Butor (Michel), 1991. "Alchimigramme", preface to the exhibition catalogue at the gallery “Le Miroir d’Encre”, Brussels.
- 1988. Pierre Cordier, exhibition catalog, Brussels, Royal Museums of Fine Arts Museum of Belgium.
- Cordier (Pierre), 2007. le chimigramme – the chemigram, Brussels, Editions Racine.
- Gernsheim (Helmut), 1986. A Concise History of Photography, New York, Dover.
- Lemagny (Jean-Claude), January 1979. “Pierre Cordier ou la photographie sens dessus dessous”, in the exhibition catalog : “Pierre Cordier”, Paris, Bibliothèque Nationale de France.
- Mélon (Marc-Emmanuel), 1996. “Pierre Cordier”, article in Encyclopaedia Universalis.
- Poivert (Michel), 2001. “Utopie du chimigramme, Pierre Cordier dans le labyrinthe de l’histoire”, in: Bulletin de la Société française de Photographie (10), Paris.
