= Edmund Kesting =

Edmund Kesting (27 July 1892, in Dresden – 21 October 1970, in Birkenwerder) was a German photographer, painter and art professor.

He studied until 1916 at the Dresden Academy of Fine Arts before participating as a soldier in the First World War, upon returning his painting teachers were Richard Müller and Otto Gussmann and in 1919 he began to teach as a professor at the private school Der Weg. In 1923 he had his first exposition in the gallery Der Sturm in which he showed photograms. When Der Weg opened a new academy in Berlin in 1927, he moved to the capital.

He formed relations with other vanguardists in Berlin and practiced various experimental techniques such as solarization, multiple images and photograms, for which reason twelve of his works were considered degenerate art by the Nazi regime and were prohibited. Among the artists with whom he interacted are Kurt Schwitters, László Moholy-Nagy, El Lissitzky and Alexander Archipenko.

At the end of World War II he formed part of a Dresden artistic group known as Künstlergruppe der ruf - befreite Kunst (Call to an art in freedom) along with Karl von Appen, Helmut Schmidt-Kirstein and Christoph Hans, among others. In this city he made an experimental report named Dresdner Totentanz (Dance of death in Dresden) as a condemnation of the bombing of the city. In 1946 he was named a member of the Academy of Art in the city.

He participated in the controversy between socialist realism and formalism that took place in the German Democratic Republic, therefore his work was not realist and could not be shown in the country between 1949 and 1959. In 1955 he began to experiment with chemical painting, making photographs without the use of a camera and only with the use of chemical products such as the developer and the fixer and photographic paper, for which he made exposures to light using masks and templates. Between 1956 and 1967 he was a professor at the Academy of Cinema and Television of Potsdam.

His artistic work was not recognized by the authorities of the German Democratic Republic until 1980, ten years after his death.
