= Maurice Tabard =

French photographer (1897-1984)

- Born: Maurice Tabard; 12 July 1897; Lyon, France
- Died: 23 February 1984 (aged 86); Nice, France
- Known for: Photography
- Movement: Surrealism

Maurice Tabard (July 12, 1897 – February 23, 1984) was a French photographer. Tabard was one of the leading photographers of the Surrealist movement, which he entered under the influence of his friend, American photographer Man Ray. His work was well known for incorporating solarization, superimposition and photomontage.

== Early life ==
Tabard was born in Lyon, France in 1897 to a silk industrialist and an amateur musician. His first artistic experiences were as a pattern designer for silk textiles. In 1914, he and his father left Paris for New York, where he pursued photography at the New York Institute of Photography. He continued his studies through to 1920 with fellow photographer, Emile Brunel.

== Career ==
Following the death of his father in 1922, Tabard became a professional portrait photographer for Backrach Studio in Baltimore. He went on to photograph important homes and well-known people, including future President Calvin Coolidge and his family.

In 1928, Tabard returned to Paris and became a fashion photographer. It was there he met Surrealist writer, Philippe Soupault, who in turn acquainted him with various prominent magazine editors including Lucien Vogel, Giron, and Alexey Brodovitch. He went on to work for a number of publications, such as Bifur, Vu, Harper’s Bazaar and Le Jardin des Modes. He made the acquaintance of Surrealists Man Ray and René Magritte, with his work beginning to reflect the influence of Surrealism. In the late 1920s, he also met Roger Parry, to whom he taught photography, and André Kertész. In 1929 his work was featured in the Film und Foto exhibition.

In 1951 Francis Quirk would curate an exhibit of his work at Lehigh University along with photographs by Ansel Adams.
