= Fachhochschule Dortmund =

German university of applied sciences

Coordinates: 51°29′33″N 7°24′51″E

Fachhochschule Dortmund - University of Applied Sciences and Arts
- Fachhochschule Dortmund

- Motto
- Type: Public
- Established: 1 August 1971
- Rector: Prof. Dr. Tamara Appel
- Academic staff: 894
- Administrative staff: 639
- Students: 14,057 (2021)
- Location: Dortmund, North Rhine-Westphalia, Germany
- Campus: Urban/Suburban
- Website: www.fh-dortmund.de

Fachhochschule Dortmund - University of Applied Sciences and Arts (German: Fachhochschule Dortmund) is a university of applied sciences (German: Fachhochschule) in Dortmund, North Rhine-Westphalia, Germany with 14,057 students, and 894 staff, 255 of which are teaching staff. It is situated in the Ruhr area, the fourth largest urban area in Europe. Fachhochschule Dortmund was created by a merger of several institutions of higher education in 1971. Owing to its history as separate institutions, it consists of three campuses in different parts of Dortmund. The Faculties of Mechanical Engineering, Electrical Engineering and Information Technology are located at Sonnenstraße near the city center. The Faculty of Design has its own campus at Max-Ophüls-Platz, while the Faculties of Applied Social Studies, Business Studies, Computer Science and Architecture are housed in several buildings next to the TU Dortmund University campus in the suburb of Eichlinghofen. The university is known for its Faculty of Business Studies. Additional offices in the city center are used for administrative purposes.
