= FinePix S5 Pro =

Fujifilm DSLR camera released in 2006

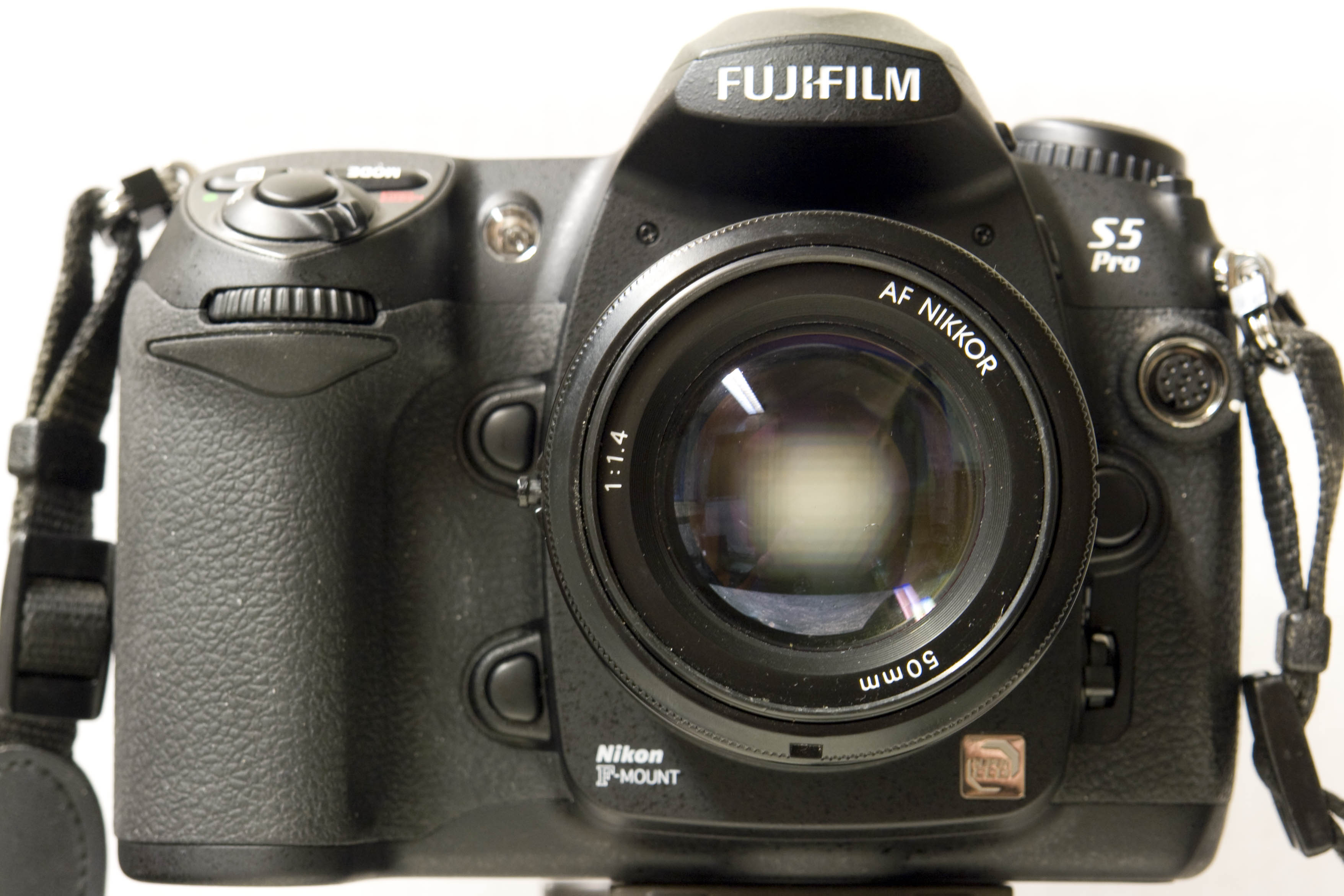

Overview
- Maker: Fujifilm Holdings Corporation
- Type: Single-lens reflex

Lens
- Lens: Interchangeable, Nikon F-mount

Sensor/medium
- Sensor: 23.0 mm × 15.5 mm Nikon DX format 1.5 × FOV crop Super CCD SR Pro
- Maximum resolution: 4256 × 2848 (12.34M/12.1 M pixels sensor/effective)
- Film speed: 100-3200
- Storage media: CompactFlash (Type I or Type II) or Hitachi Microdrive

Focusing
- Focus modes: Instant single-servo AF (S), continuous-servo AF (C), manual (M)
- Focus areas: Normal: 11 areas; Wide: focus area can be selected from 7 areas

Exposure/metering
- Exposure modes: Programmed Auto [P] with flexible program; Shutter-Priority Auto [S]; Aperture Priority Auto [A]; Manual [M]
- Exposure metering: Three-mode through-the-lens (TTL) exposure metering
- Metering modes: 3D Colour Matrix Metering II, Centre-weighted and Spot

Flash
- Flash: Manual pop-up with button release Guide number (ISO 100, m)
- Flash bracketing: 3 to +1 EV in increments of 1/3 or 1/2 EV

Shutter
- Shutter: Electronically controlled vertical-travel focal plane shutter
- Shutter speed range: 30 s – 1/8000 s, bulb
- Continuous shooting: 3frame/s standard Dynamic Range 1.5 frame/s in extended ranges

Viewfinder
- Viewfinder: Optical

Image processing
- White balance: Auto, Six presets, Manual preset (four), Kelvin temperature, Fine tunable
- WB bracketing: 2 to 9 frames in increments of 1, 2 or 3

General
- LCD screen: 2.5-inch (63.5 mm) TFT LCD, 230,000 pixels
- Battery: Fujifilm NP-150 Lithium-Ion battery
- Optional battery packs: MB-D200 battery pack with one or two Fujifilm NP-150 or six AA batteries
- Weight: About 830 g without battery, memory card, body cap, or monitor cover

The FinePix S5 Pro is a digital single lens reflex camera introduced by Fujifilm on 25 September 2006 and since discontinued. It replaces the previous FinePix S3 Pro and keeps the Nikon F mount compatibility, including DX size lenses. It is based on the Nikon D200 body, and benefits from its improvements: 11-point autofocus, i-TTL flash, a bigger 2.5-inch (64 mm) LCD and a lithium-ion battery. It has a Super CCD 23 mm × 15.5 mm image sensor of the same configuration as its predecessor, with 6.17 million low-sensitivity pixels and 6.17 million high-sensitivity pixels to give a high dynamic range, and a boost to 3200 ISO.

It introduces also a face detection feature for reviewing those details faster and an improved iteration of the S3 Pro's "live view" function to help focusing, and to take pictures without using the viewfinder. It is possible to use it in tethered operation, to connect a barcode reader and a wired ethernet or Wi-Fi link.

== Compatibility with Nikon D200 battery systems ==
While the Finepix S5 Pro shares the same body design as the Nikon D200, it is not compatible with the Nikon D200's EN-EL3e battery system. The Finepix S5 Pro will only work with Fujifilm NP-150 lithium batteries, when using the Nikon MB-D200 battery grip you must also use either Fujifilm NP-150 lithium batteries or 6 AA cells. Fuji only approves LR6 (AA Alkaline), HR6 (AA Ni-MH) and ZR6 (AA Ni-Mn). Fuji does not approve the use of Ni-CD, lithium or manganese AA Batteries.

== UV/IR version of camera ==
On July 13, 2007, Fujifilm announced an ultraviolet and infrared sensitive version of the Finepix S5 Pro, the FinePix IS Pro. The camera is marketed towards the law-enforcement, medical and scientific communities.

== See also ==
- FinePix S3 Pro
- FinePix IS Pro

Family	Level	Sensor	1998	1999	2000	2001	2002	2003	2004	2005	2006	2007	2008	2009	2010
Fujix	Professional	2/3 inch		DS-565											
Fujix	Professional	2/3 inch		DS-560											
FinePix	Industrial	APS-C										S3 Pro UVIR	IS Pro		
FinePix	Advanced	APS-C			S1 Pro		S2 Pro		S3 Pro			S5 Pro			
