= FinePix IS Pro =

Digital single lens reflex camera

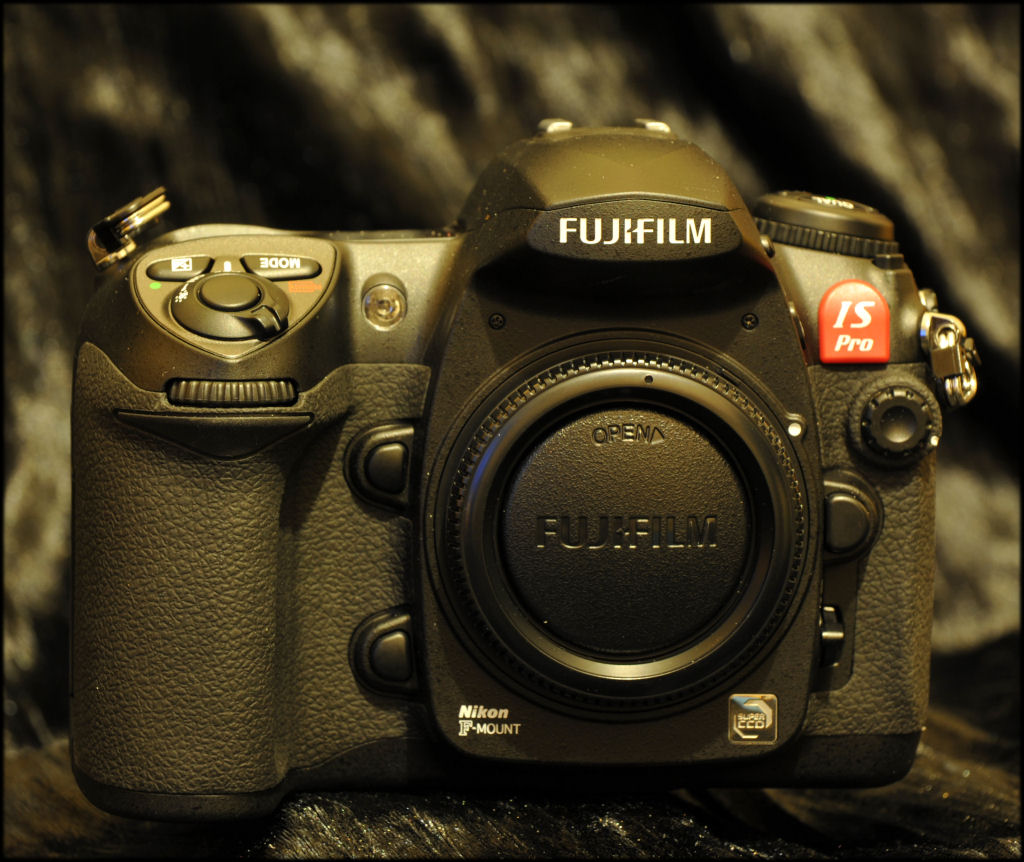

Overview
- Maker: Fujifilm Holdings Corporation
- Type: Single-lens reflex

Lens
- Lens: Interchangeable, Nikon F-mount

Sensor/medium
- Sensor: 23.0 mm × 15.5 mm Super CCD SR Pro
- Maximum resolution: 4256 × 2848 (12.34M/12.1 M pixels sensor/effective)
- Film speed: 100-3200
- Storage media: CompactFlash (Type I or Type II) or Hitachi Microdrive

Focusing
- Focus modes: Instant single-servo AF (S), continuous-servo AF (C), manual (M)
- Focus areas: Normal: 11 areas; Wide: focus area can be selected from 7 areas

Exposure/metering
- Exposure modes: Programmed Auto [P] with flexible program; Shutter-Priority Auto [S]; Aperture Priority Auto [A]; Manual [M]
- Exposure metering: Three-mode through-the-lens (TTL) exposure metering
- Metering modes: 3D Colour Matrix Metering II, Centre-weighted and Spot

Flash
- Flash: Manual pop-up with button release Guide number (ISO 100, m)
- Flash bracketing: 3 to +1 EV in increments of 1/3 or 1/2 EV

Shutter
- Shutter: Electronically controlled vertical-travel focal plane shutter
- Shutter speed range: 30 s – 1/8000 s, bulb

Viewfinder
- Viewfinder: Optical

Image processing
- White balance: Auto, Six presets, Manual preset (four), Kelvin temperature, Fine tunable

General
- LCD screen: 2.5-inch (63.5 mm) TFT LCD, 230,000 pixels
- Battery: Fujifilm NP-150 Lithium-Ion battery
- Optional battery packs: MB-D200 battery pack with one or two Fujifilm NP-150 or six AA batteries
- Weight: About 830 g without battery, memory card, body cap, or monitor cover

The FinePix IS Pro is a digital single lens reflex camera introduced by Fujifilm in 2007. It is based on a FinePix S5 Pro, which is in turn based on the Nikon D200. It has a Nikon F lens mount and can use most lenses made for 35 mm Nikon SLR cameras. It replaces the Fujifilm FinePix S3 Pro UVIR.

Unlike most digital cameras, there is no IR or UV filtering in front of the image sensor. This results in a wide spectral response of approximately 1000 nm to 380 nm (infrared to ultraviolet). Suitable external bandpass filters are required to photograph in IR or UV wavelengths. Infrared filters are readily available at low cost from many sources, but ultraviolet filters – and suitable lenses – can be expensive.

Photography in infrared and ultraviolet poses its own special challenges regarding exposure and – above all – focusing a SLR camera. By definition, these forms of light are invisible to the human eye. The IS Pro includes a Live View mode that relays what the sensor sees as live video to the LCD screen (and, optionally, via USB to a computer running appropriate software). Some lenses have separate IR focus index marks, which help, but few if any have UV marks. True ultraviolet photographic lenses are generally made from special glass because normal optical glass does not pass UV particularly well. However, because the sensor is only sensitive to long-wavelength UV, a quartz lens is not required.

The IS Pro was originally intended for specialist markets like Forensic photography, medical, museum and fine art. FujiFilm generally restricts the sale of these cameras to professional users in these and similar fields; their EULA specifically prohibits "unethical photographic conduct". Very few have ever gone on open public sale, although some were made available via dealers at closeout prices in fall 2010.

A niche use for these cameras is in field of astrophotography. The extended IR and UV sensitivity makes them useful for imaging Ha emission nebulae.

== See also ==
- Infrared photography
- Ultraviolet photography
- FinePix S5 Pro
- Nikon D200

| Family | Level | Sensor | 1998 | 1999 | 2000 | 2001 | 2002 | 2003 | 2004 | 2005 | 2006 | 2007 | 2008 | 2009 | 2010 |
| Fujix | Professional | 2/3 inch | | DS-565 | | | | | | | | | | | |
| Fujix | Professional | 2/3 inch | | DS-560 | | | | | | | | | | | |
| FinePix | Industrial | APS-C | | | | | | | | | | S3 Pro UVIR | IS Pro | | |
| FinePix | Advanced | APS-C | | | S1 Pro | | S2 Pro | | S3 Pro | | | S5 Pro | | | |
