= FinePix S3 Pro =

2004 APS-C digital single-lens reflex camera

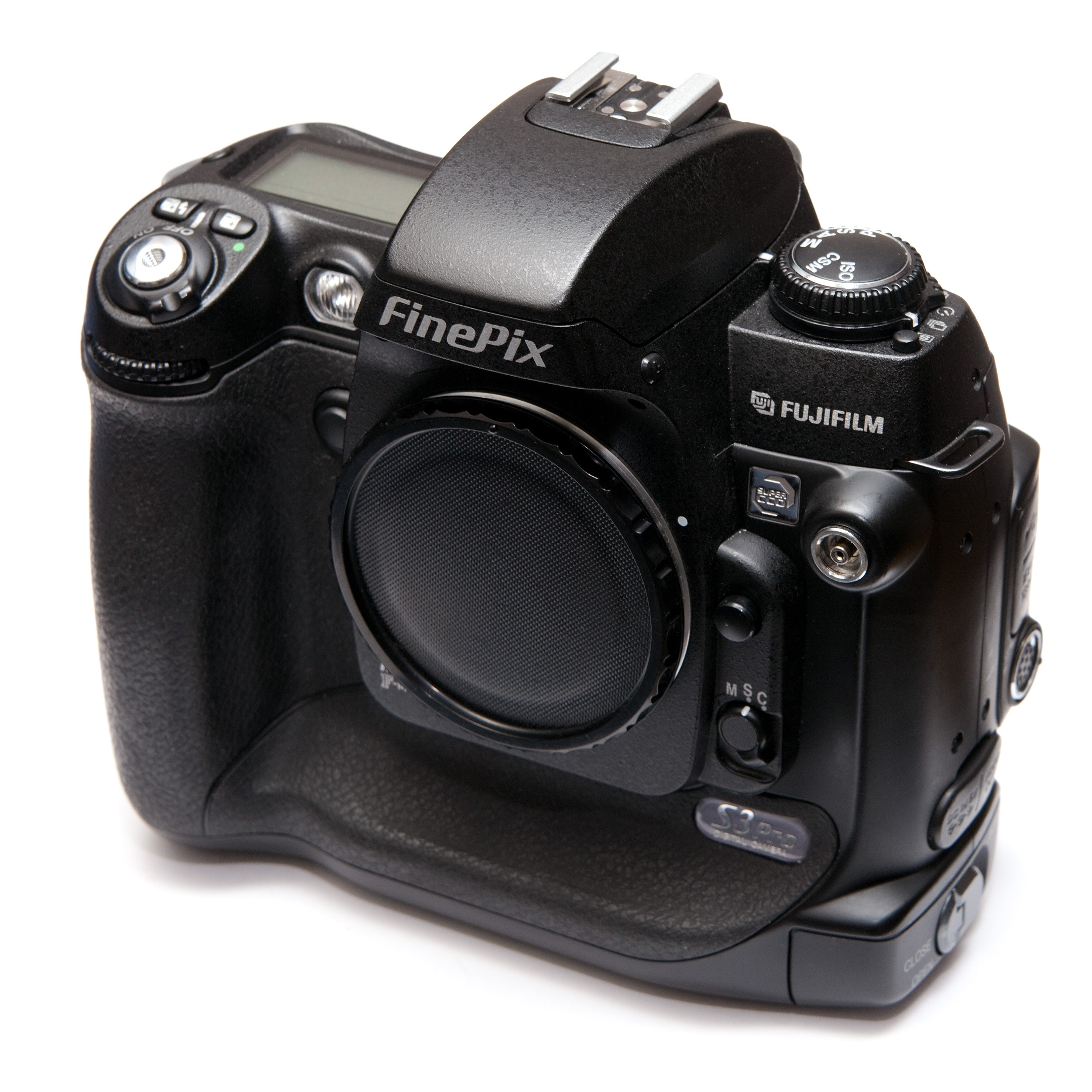
Fujifilm FinePix S3 Pro

The Fujifilm FinePix S3 Pro is an interchangeable lens digital single-lens reflex camera introduced in February 2004. Its successor, the Finepix S5 Pro, was released on 25 September 2006. It is based on a Nikon F80 (N80 in the U.S.) viewfinder, shutter, mirror-box and autofocus modules surrounded by a Fujifilm body that includes its own proprietary CCD image sensor and electronics, and a vertical grip shutter release. It has a Nikon F lens mount and can use most lenses made for 35 mm Nikon SLR cameras, but only with manual operation with Nikon AIS lenses, unusually for a digital SLR the S3 Pro can be used with a manual cable release.

It is autofocusing and has an electronically controlled focal plane shutter with speeds from 30 sec. to 1/4000 sec. with x-flash synchronization at shutter speeds up to 1/180 sec. It has built-in exposure metering with spot, center weighted and evaluative modes and also features a pop-up flash. Its ISO film speed equivalents range from 100 through 125, 160, 200, 400, 800 and 1600. The camera is discontinued and no longer in production.

The camera's principal distinction is its 23mm x 15.5mm photo sensor. Designated the Super CCD SR, it is unique in two ways. First, like its predecessors used in the earlier FinePix S1 Pro and FinePix S2 Pro, it has its photodiodes oriented diagonally rather than horizontally and vertically as in all other DSLR cameras. This allows the use of a sophisticated interpolation system that produces an output image equivalent to 12.1 megapixels. The apparent resolution of images in this interpolated mode lay somewhere between 6.17 megapixels and the 12.34 megapixel interpolated output.

Second, it uses two photodiodes in each photo site when capturing an image at full resolution, with a primary sensor providing the normal sensitivity of a CCD sensor and another which is smaller and less sensitive. The purpose of this scheme is to provide greater resistance to the gross overexposure of highlights which is more common among digital cameras than film cameras. When used in 6 megapixel mode, the secondary, highlight sensor is disabled and only the larger sensor captures an image.

The S3 can produce images in JPEG format with the option of three rendering tonalities. Two of these ('F1' and 'F2') are generally regarded to emulate the look of Fujifilm colour films. The third ('Standard') gives a more neutral image and may also be set for B&W (monochrome) capture.

Like the S5 which superseded it, the S3 gained popularity amongst numerous, professional Wedding Photographers for its ability to more accurately render skin tones and for its wide dynamic range, compared to comparable digital cameras of its time.

The S3 can utilise two types of memory card storage: CF and XD cards.

The camera can be remotely tethered to a computer via a Firewire connection.

A monochrome-only, Live View capability is available for image composition via the rear LCD screen of the camera. This can be viewed for a maximum duration of thirty seconds, at which time mirror lock up is automatically cancelled and default function resumes.

== Ultraviolet/infrared version ==
On August 9, 2006, Fujifilm announced a variation of the S3 Pro capable of photographing in the ultraviolet and (principally) infrared spectra, the Fujifilm FinePix S3 Pro UVIR.

Family	Level	Sensor	1998	1999	2000	2001	2002	2003	2004	2005	2006	2007	2008	2009	2010
Fujix	Professional	2/3 inch		DS-565											
Fujix	Professional	2/3 inch		DS-560											
FinePix	Industrial	APS-C										S3 Pro UVIR	IS Pro		
FinePix	Advanced	APS-C			S1 Pro		S2 Pro		S3 Pro			S5 Pro			
