= Infrared photography =

Near-infrared imaging

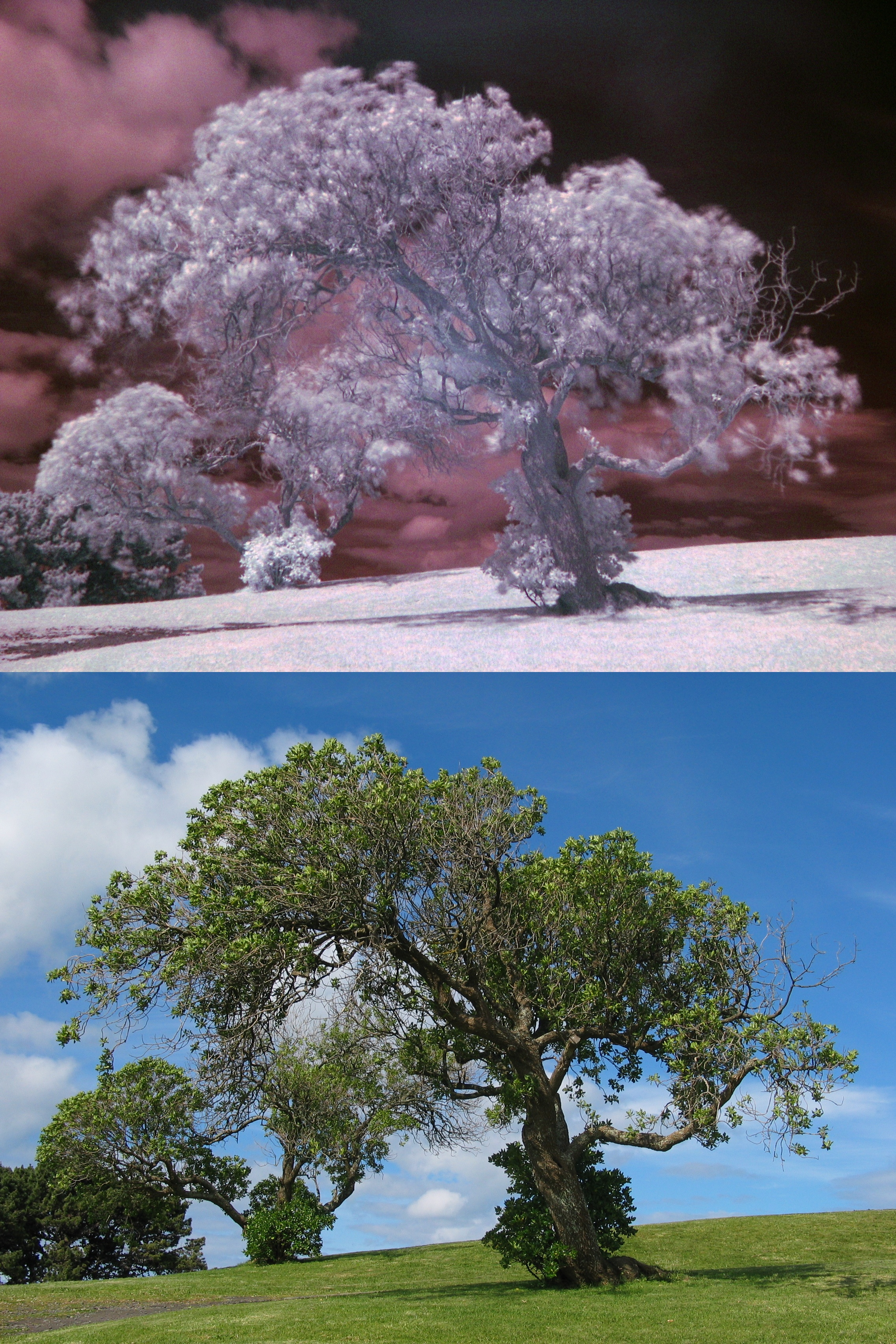
This comparison shows two photographs of the same tree, with the top image in near infrared and the bottom image in visible light.

In infrared photography, the photographic film or image sensor used is sensitive to infrared light. The part of the spectrum used is referred to as near-infrared to distinguish it from far-infrared, which is the domain of thermal imaging. Wavelengths used for photography range from about 700 nm to about 900 nm. Film is usually sensitive to visible light too, so an infrared-passing filter is used; this lets infrared (IR) light pass through to the camera, but blocks all or most of the visible light spectrum. These filters thus look black (opaque) or deep red. (Note: The term "infrared filter" can be used to refer two types of filters: either a high-pass filter for infrared photography which blocks wavelengths of light lower than a certain value, allowing infrared to pass, or a low-pass filter that blocks infrared and higher wavelengths but passes visible wavelengths. To distinguish the two types, the low-pass filter is sometimes called a hot mirror instead.)

When these filters are used together with infrared-sensitive film or sensors, "in-camera effects" can be obtained, false-color or black-and-white images with a dreamlike or sometimes lurid appearance known as the Wood effect, an effect mainly caused by foliage (such as tree leaves and grass) strongly reflecting infrared in the same way visible light is reflected from snow. (Note: The Wood effect results from the transparency of chlorophyll at wavelengths over 500 nm, allowing light to be reflected within the plant cells. Normally the effect is invisible because so much green light is reflected by the foliage, but it is possible to see the effect, albeit dimly, with the naked eye by looking through a 720 nm filter (or similar) on a sunny day and allowing your eye to adjust to the low light.) There is a small contribution from chlorophyll fluorescence, but this is marginal and is not the real cause of the brightness seen in infrared photographs. The effect is named after the infrared photography pioneer Robert W. Wood, and not after the material wood, which does not strongly reflect infrared.

The other attributes of infrared photographs include very dark skies and penetration of atmospheric haze, caused by reduced Rayleigh scattering and Mie scattering, respectively, compared to visible light. The dark skies, in turn, result in less infrared light in shadows and dark reflections of those skies from water, and clouds will stand out strongly. These wavelengths also penetrate a few millimeters into skin and give a milky look to portraits, although eyes often look black.

== History ==
Infrared imaging examples

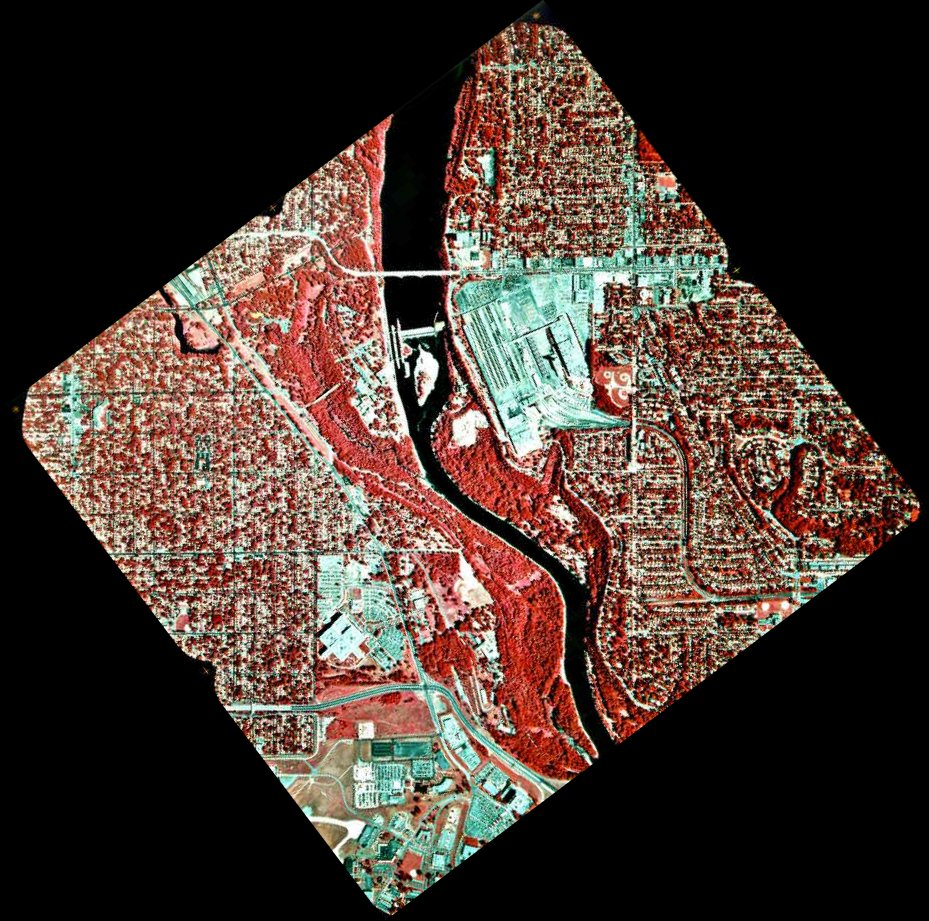
False-color infrared image of the Mississippi River crossed by a bridge and a dam, between red foliage on left, and green parking lots and buildings on right

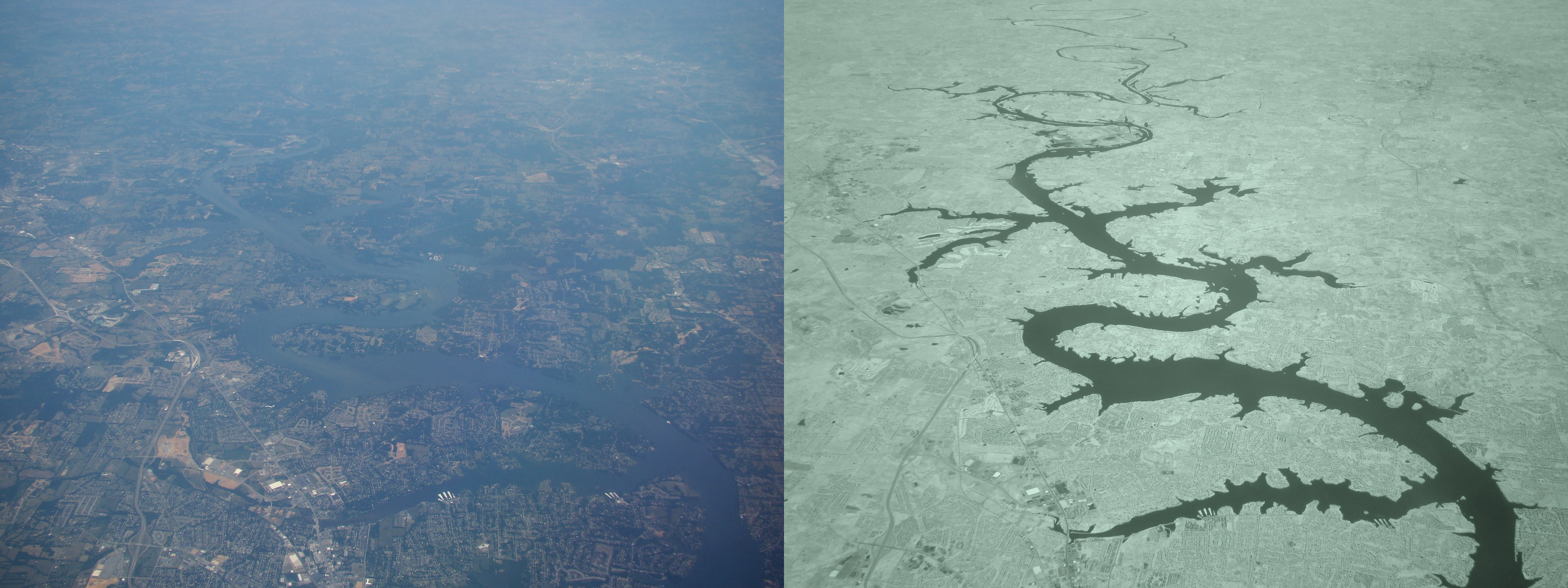
Visible and infrared (900 nm LP) aerial photography of Old Hickory Lake, Tennessee. Taken from a passenger airplane within seconds apart using a Sony H-9 Digital camera.

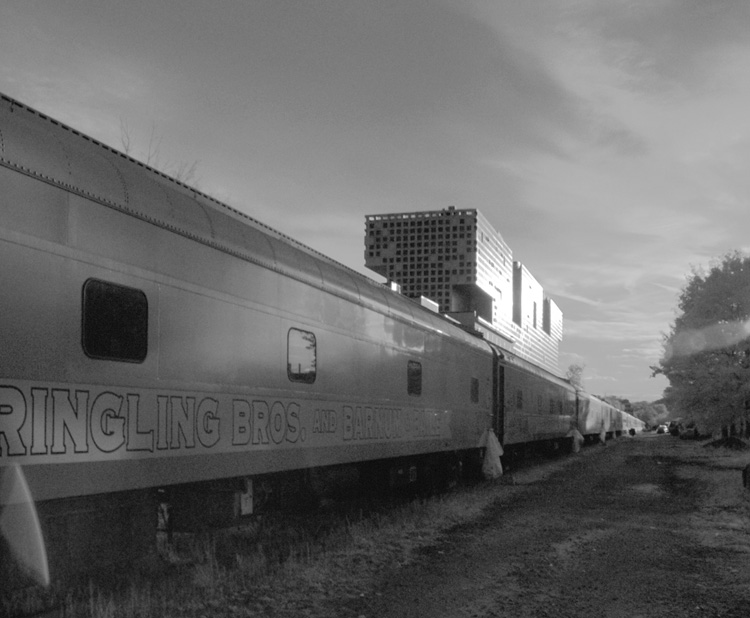
A near-infrared photograph of a Ringling Brothers' circus train idling near MIT in Cambridge, Massachusetts

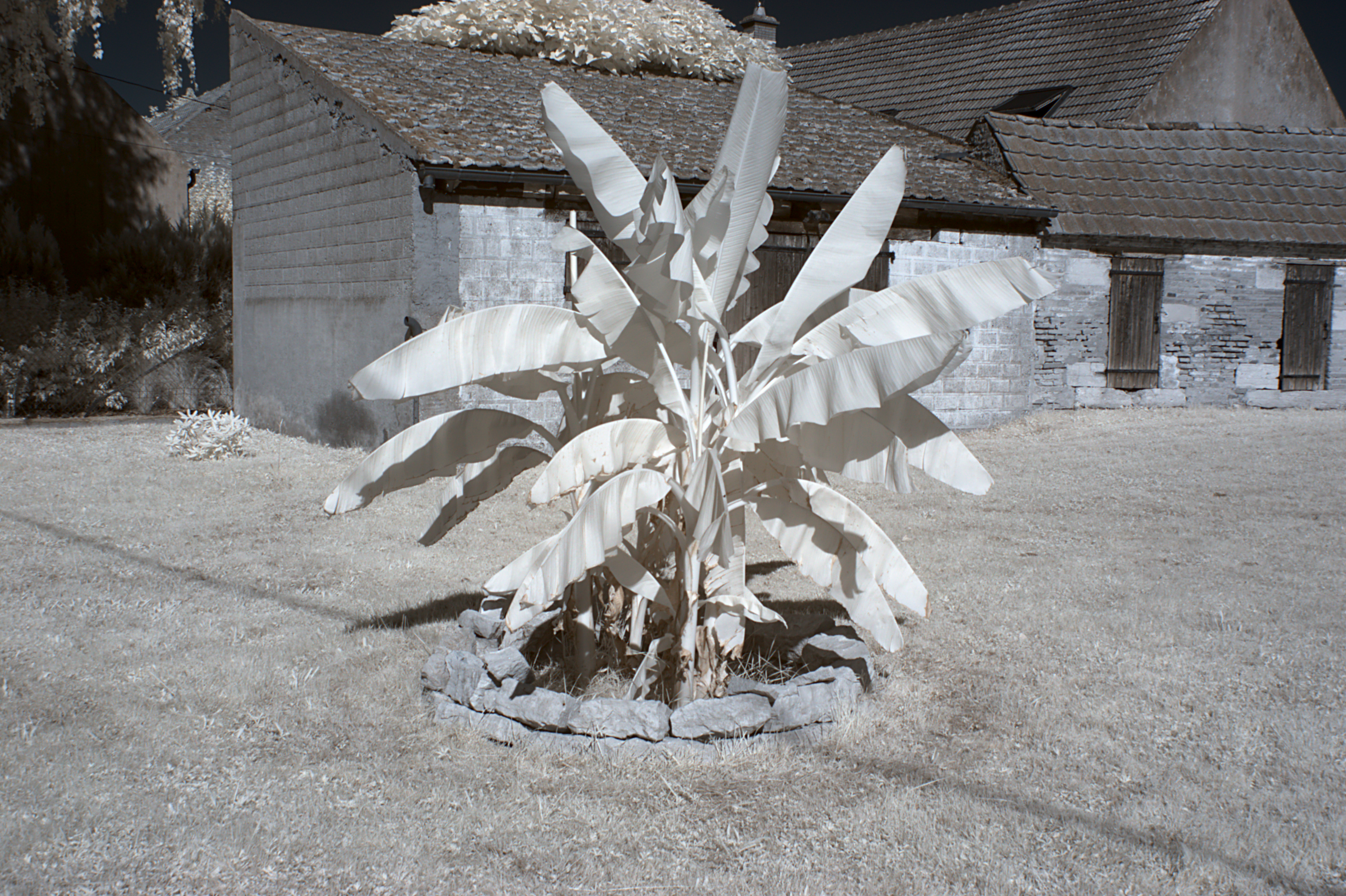
Digital infrared photograph showcasing the Wood effect on vegetation

Until the early 20th century, infrared photography was not possible because silver halide emulsions are not sensitive to longer wavelengths than that of blue light (and to a lesser extent, green light) without the addition of a dye to act as a color sensitizer. The first infrared photographs (as distinct from spectrographs) to be published appeared in the February 1910 edition of The Century Magazine and in the October 1910 edition of the Royal Photographic Society Journal to illustrate papers by Robert W. Wood, who discovered the unusual effects that now bear his name. The RPS co-ordinated events to celebrate the centenary of this event in 2010. Wood's photographs were taken on experimental film that required very long exposures; thus, most of his work focused on landscapes. A further set of infrared landscapes taken by Wood in Italy in 1911 used plates provided for him by C. E. K. Mees at Wratten & Wainwright. Mees also took a few infrared photographs in Portugal in 1910, which are now in the Kodak archives.

Infrared-sensitive photographic plates were developed in the United States during World War I for spectroscopic analysis, and infrared sensitizing dyes were investigated for improved haze penetration in aerial photography. After 1930, new emulsions from Kodak and other manufacturers became useful to infrared astronomy.

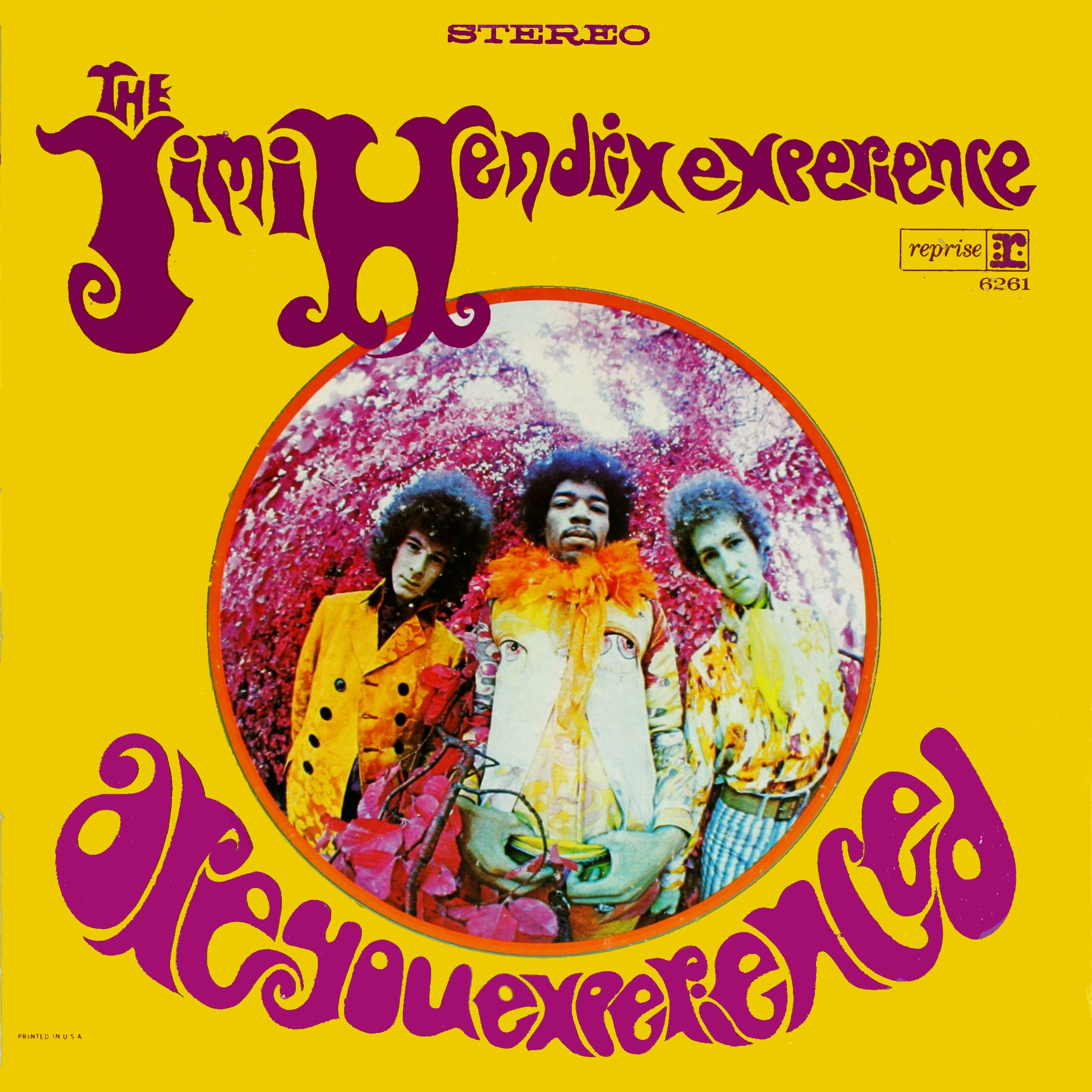
Album cover of Are You Experienced (1967) by The Jimi Hendrix Experience; the photographer captured the trio with a fisheye lens on color infrared film

Infrared photography became popular with photography enthusiasts in the 1930s, when suitable film was introduced commercially. The Times regularly published landscape and aerial photographs taken by their staff photographers using Ilford infrared film. By 1937, 33 kinds of infrared film were available from five manufacturers including Agfa, Kodak and Ilford. Infrared movie film was also available and was used to create day-for-night effects in motion pictures. A notable example being the pseudo-night aerial sequences in the movie The Bride Came C.O.D., starring James Cagney and Bette Davis.

False-color infrared photography became widely practiced with the introduction of Kodak Ektachrome Infrared Aero Film and Ektachrome Infrared EIR. The first version of this, known as Kodacolor Aero-Reversal-Film, was developed by Clark and others at Kodak for camouflage detection in the 1940s. The EIR film became more widely available in the form of 35 mm film in the 1960s but has been since discontinued.

Infrared photography became popular with a number of 1960s recording artists, because of the unusual results; Jimi Hendrix, Donovan, Frank Zappa and the Grateful Dead all issued albums with infrared cover photos. The unexpected colors and effects that infrared film can produce fit well with the psychedelic aesthetic emerging in the 1960s.

== Techniques and special equipment ==
=== Infrared filters ===
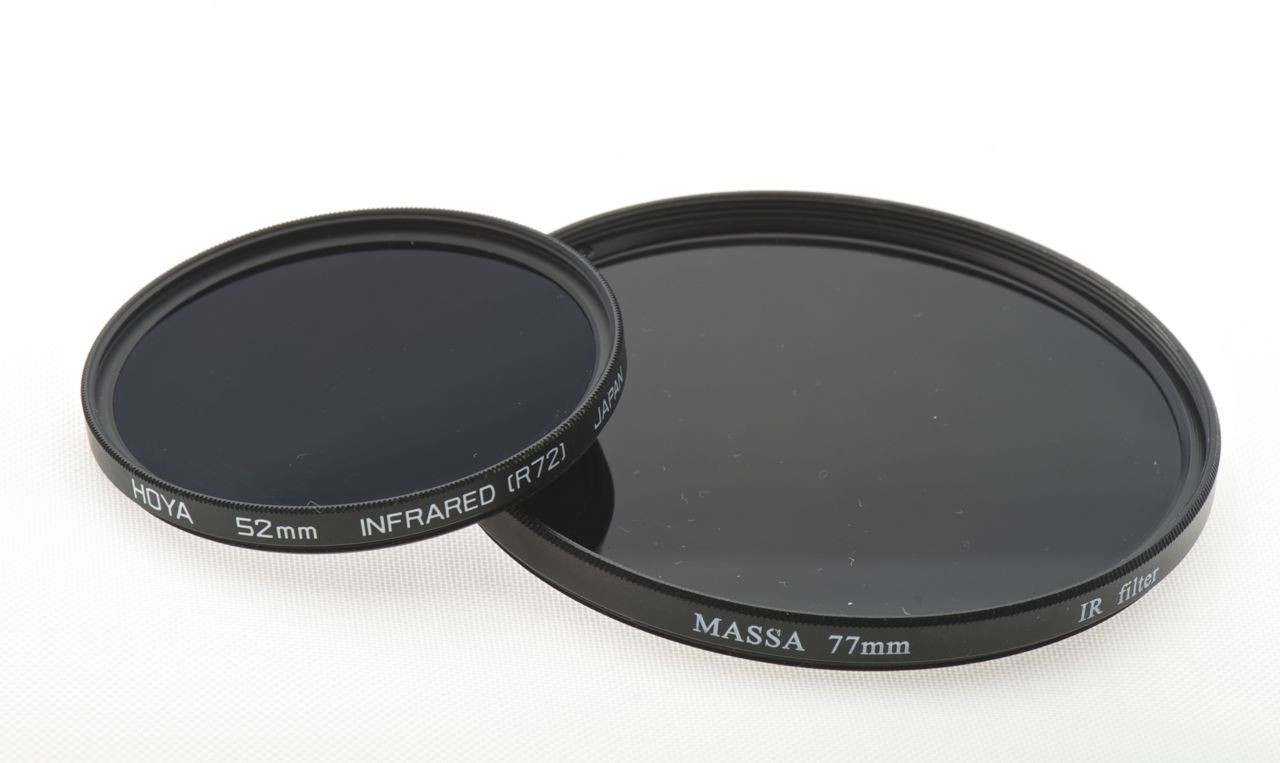
Infrared-passing filters

Infrared light lies between the visible and microwave portions of the electromagnetic spectrum. Infrared light has a range of wavelengths, just like visible light has wavelengths that range from red light to violet. "Near infrared" light is closest in wavelength to visible light, ranging from approximately 700 to 5000 nm, and "far infrared" is closer to the microwave region of the electromagnetic spectrum, ranging from approximately 25 to 350 μm. The longer, far infrared wavelengths are about the size of a pinhead and the shorter, near infrared ones are the size of cells, or are microscopic.

Historically, black-and-white infrared films are sensitive to near infrared wavelengths shorter than approximately 860 nm, and retain significant sensitivity to blue wavelengths. Infrared-passing filters are used in black-and-white infrared photography to block blue wavelengths and limit the photograph to infrared wavelengths only. Without filters, infrared negative films look much like conventional negative films because the blue sensitivity lowers the contrast and effectively counteracts the infrared look of the film. Typically, a red filter (Wratten #25) is recommended as the best compromise, which removes blue wavelengths while still passing enough visible light for focusing.

Wratten IR filter nos.
No.	50% (nm) (Note: The approximate transition wavelength where the filter achieves 50% transmission; longer wavelengths are passed, while lower wavelengths are absorbed.)
15	530
21	560
23A	580
25	600
29	620
70	675
89B	720
88	735
72B	740
88A	750
87	795
87C	850
87B	930
87A	1050

Some photographers use orange or red filters to allow slight amounts of blue wavelengths to reach the film, and thus lower the contrast. The majority of black-and-white infrared art, landscape, and wedding photography is done using orange (Wratten #15 or 21), red (#23, 25, or 29) or visually opaque (#72) (Note: In addition to its high-pass spectral characteristics, Wratten #72B has an additional transmission notch, peaking at approximately 10% in the red-orange band, centered on 600 nm.) filters over the lens to block the blue visible light from the exposure. Very dark-red (#29) filters block out almost all blue, and visually opaque (#70, 89b, 87c, 72) filters block out all blue and also visible red wavelengths, resulting in a more pure-infrared photo with a more pronounced contrast.

Instead of the Wratten number, some manufacturers embed the transition or cutoff wavelength in the name of the filter. For example, Hoya markets the R72 (720 nm cutoff, 750 nm 50% transition) and RM90 (900 nm cutoff) filters for infrared photography. B+W (Schneider Kreuznach) and Heliopan sell filters using glass sourced from Schott AG, including types RG695 (695 nm transition, considered approximately equivalent to Wratten #89B), RG715 (715 nm, #88A), RG780 (780 nm, #87), RG830, RG850, and RG1000.

=== Focusing infrared ===
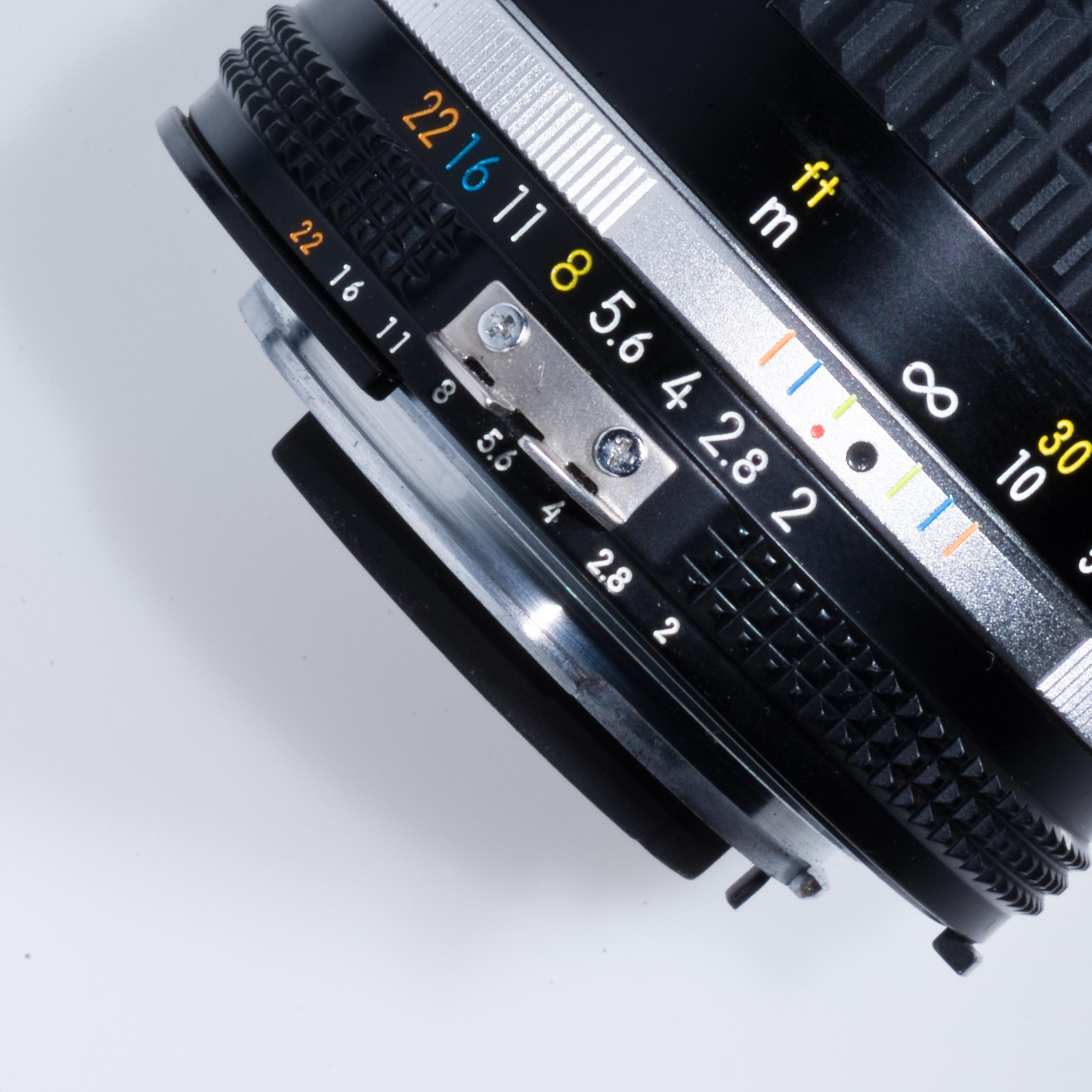
Nikon lens for Nikon F mount; the infrared index mark is the small red dot under one yellow hash mark for hyperfocal range at f/8.

Many manual focus lenses for 35 mm single-lens reflex cameras (SLR) and medium format SLR have a red dot, line or diamond, often with a red "R" called the infrared index mark, which can be used to achieve proper infrared focus; many autofocus lenses no longer have this mark. For these lenses, after visual focus is achieved for the intended subject, the distance indicated by the visual focusing mark is then re-set to the infrared index mark. Without refocusing, a sharp infrared photograph can be taken by proper hyperfocal settings, which generally requires a tripod, a narrow aperture (like f/8); however, wider apertures like f/2.0 can produce sharp photos when the lens is meticulously refocused to the infrared index mark, and only if this index mark is the correct one for the filter and film in use. Diffraction effects inside a camera are greater at infrared wavelengths so that stopping down the lens too far may actually reduce sharpness.

Some lens manufacturers such as Leica never put IR index marks on their lenses. The reason for this is that any index mark is only valid for one particular IR filter and film combination, and may lead to user error. Even when using lenses with index marks, focus testing is advisable as there may be a large difference between the index mark and the subject plane.

Most apochromatic ('APO') lenses do not have an Infrared index mark and do not need to be refocused for the infrared spectrum because they are already optically corrected into the near-infrared spectrum. Catadioptric lenses do not often require this adjustment because their mirror containing elements do not suffer from chromatic aberration and so the overall aberration is comparably less. Catadioptric lenses do, of course, still contain lenses, and these lenses do still have a dispersive property.

When a SLR camera is fitted with a filter that is opaque to visible light, the reflex system becomes useless for both framing and focusing, one must compose the picture without the filter and then attach the filter. This requires the use of a tripod to prevent the composition from changing.

Zoom lenses may scatter more light through their more complicated optical systems than prime lenses, that is, lenses of fixed focal length; for example, an infrared photo taken with a 50 mm prime lens may have more contrast than the same image taken at 50 mm with a 28–80 zoom.

== Film cameras ==
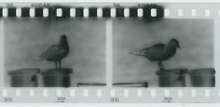
Infrared negatives fogged by the frame counter of a Minolta Maxxum 4

Many conventional cameras can be used for near-infrared photography, where the portion of the infrared is light of a wavelength only slightly longer than that of visible light. Photography of the far-infrared spectrum with longer wavelengths is called thermography and requires special equipment.

With some patience and ingenuity, most film cameras can be used. However, some cameras of the 1990s that used 35 mm film have infrared sprocket-hole sensors that can fog infrared film (their manuals may warn against the use of infrared film for this reason). Other film cameras are not completely opaque to infrared light.

Arguably the greatest obstacle to infrared film photography has been the difficulty of obtaining infrared-sensitive film. Kodak typically manufactured just one or two batches of infrared films per year. In addition, the popularity of digital photography has pushed film manufacturers to discontinue niche film products, including infrared-sensitive films. The discontinuance of Konica Infrared 750 (2006), Kodak High-Speed Infrared (2007), and Efke IR820 Aura (2012) has now narrowed the selection for black-and-white infrared film to Agfa Aviphot films, made for areal photography. These films are not available directly to consumers and must be purchased in large quantities and non-consumer formats. This film is often bought by large companies and sold in consumer quantities and formats under different brands, such as Rollei Infrared 400 film.

=== Black-and-white infrared film ===
Black-and-white infrared negative films are sensitive to wavelengths in the 700 to 900 nm near infrared spectrum, and most also have an inherent sensitivity to blue light wavelengths. Kodak High-Speed Infrared (HIE), which produced negatives for photographic prints, was one of the most common black-and-white infrared films used. Because HIE was so prevalent, black-and-white infrared photographs have been associated with a notable halation effect or glow often seen in the highlights, similar to the soft focus effect of uncorrected spherical aberration. This halation is an artifact of the clear polyester film base used for HIE and not inherent to infrared photography; it is caused by the absence of an anti-halation layer on the back side of Kodak HIE film, which results in a scattering or blooming around the highlights that would usually be absorbed by the anti-halation layer in conventional films. In addition, the clear backing means that Kodak HIE must only be loaded and unloaded in total darkness. (Note: This is because HIE lacks anti-halation layers and has a completely transparent base rather than being directly due to infrared sensitivity. Film usually has a slightly fogged base and anti-halation layers coated on it in order to stop light reflections in the substrate while the film is being exposed. Light can enter film through the tail protruding from a 35mm canister and without a fogged base it will be piped into the film and expose it. Without an anti-halation layer, any light entering the substrate through the emulsion will be reflected back and forth inside the film, becoming diffuse as it travels and causing halation. HIE lacked a fogged base and anti-halation layers for two reasons: sensitivity is increased by allowing light to reflect back and forth and it was difficult to find any way of treating the film that would be effective at infrared wavelengths.)

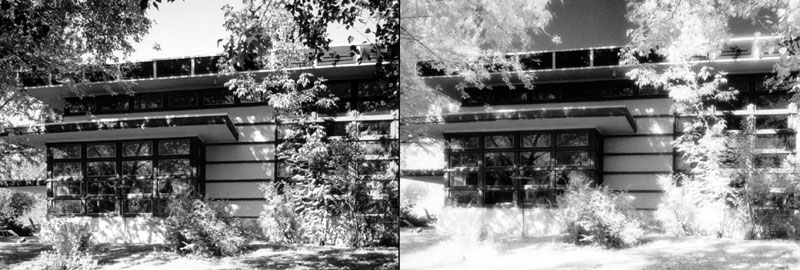
Frank Lloyd Wright's Rudin House: panchromatic film on the left, infrared on the right

Infrared black-and-white films require special development times but exposed film can be processed using standard black-and-white photographic developers and chemicals, including D-76; the choice of chemical may affect the characteristic exposure/density curve. Kodak HIE film has a polyester film base that is very stable but extremely easy to scratch, therefore special care must be used in the handling of Kodak HIE throughout the development and printing/scanning process to avoid damage to the film.

Kodak HIE was sensitive to 900 nm. Other infrared black-and-white films include:

- Agfa Aviphot (sensitive to approximately 770 nm) Widely available in most formats, such as 135 film, 120 film, and sheets by larger resellers (such as Rollei as 80S, 400S and IR 400) and individuals. Occasionally 220 film, 70mm film, and other formats not sold at scale may be available from individual sellers.
- Fotokemika/Efke IR 820 (also sensitive to approximately 800 nm)
- Ilford SFX 200 ("extended" sensitivity in the near-infrared range to 740 nm)
- Konica Infrared 750 (sensitive to approximately 800 nm)

=== Color infrared film ===
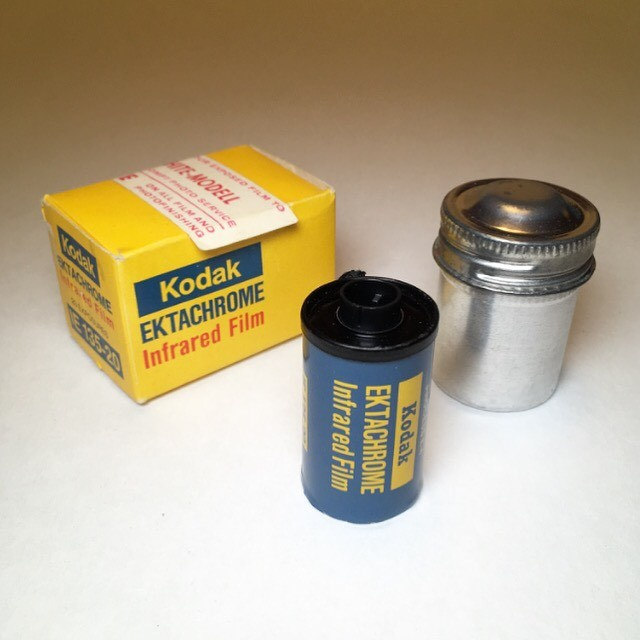
Kodak Ektachrome Infrared Color 35mm Color Film (expired in the 1970s)

Like HIE, the most commonly used infrared color reversal film, also called transparency or slide film, was manufactured by Kodak and sold as Ektachrome Infrared (EIR), under code 2236, packaged as a 36-exposure roll; in addition, Kodak made EIR in bulk lengths (for the motion picture industry) and the similar Aerochrome III Infrared for aerial photography (codes 1443 and SO-734). EIR originally was developed during World War II as a means to detect camouflaged objects, taking advantage of the difference in infrared reflectance between plants and green paint, and was adopted by the military and scientific communities after the war. It was not marketed to consumers until the 1960s. To improve camouflage paint, companies began incorporating infrared-reflecting materials.

Color reversal film

During exposure, light selectively sensitizes each of the three wavelength-sensitive layers; an internal blue-blocking filter is used to prevent false sensitization of the red- and green-sensitive layers

After E-6 development process, with subtractive color negative layers

The structure of all color reversal films (both standard and infrared-sensitive) contains at least three separate photosensitive layers. Each layer is specifically sensitized to respond to a different set of wavelengths; for instance, a standard color reversal film has red-, green-, and blue-sensitive layers. During the modern E-6 process of development, grains of silver halide that were sensitized by the appropriate wavelengths of light in each layer react with a reducing agent to form metallic silver particles. The unexposed grains are then sensitized chemically during a second development step and produce oxidized developer, which react with dye coupler compounds embedded in the film emulsion layers to form negative images in various color dyes, respective to how the silver halide was originally sensitized for each layer.

In conventional color films, the topmost (blue-sensitive) layer gets exposed to light prior to the green- and red-sensitive layers stacked behind it. Since the green- and red-sensitive layers also retain an inherent sensitivity to blue light, a yellow filter layer is placed behind the blue-sensitive layer, in front of the green and red-sensitive layers. This serves to minimize undesired passthrough of shorter wavelengths that are not supposed to expose the bottom layers.

During development, each emulsion layer forms a negative image in the appropriate subtractive color (cyan-magenta-yellow): the blue-sensitive layer forms a yellow-dyed ("minus-blue") negative image, the green-sensitive layer forms a magenta-dyed negative image, and the red-sensitive layer forms a cyan-dyed negative image. When the slide is viewed or projected by passing white light through these stacked layers, the visible wavelengths are filtered correspondingly with the reversed colors. For example, blue light will result in no yellow dye formation in the blue-sensitive layer, but cyan and magenta dye will form in the red- and green-sensitive layers. By projecting white light through the combined layers, blue is produced: cyan (aka negative-red) removes red and passes blue and green, and magenta (aka negative-green) removes green and passes blue and red; when these layers are stacked, only blue light is passed.

Since silver halides are sensitive to wavelengths of light outside of the visible range of the electromagnetic spectrum, longer wavelengths corresponding with infrared light can be captured by using suitable dyes. Without specialized dyes, silver halides are only sensitive to a wavelength shorter than around 450 nm.

Comparison of color reversal film structure (E-6 process)
Conventional			Infrared		
Layer	Present	Final dye color	Final dye color	Present	Layer
Yellow filter (external)	Not used	—N/a	—N/a	During exposure	Yellow filter (external)
Blue-sensitive	Present	Yellow	Cyan	Present	IR-sensitive
Yellow filter (internal)	Present	Carey Lea silver, bleached clear	—N/a	Not present	Yellow filter (internal)
Green-sensitive	Present	Magenta	Yellow	Present	Green-sensitive layer
Red-sensitive	Present	Cyan	Magenta	Present	Red-sensitive

Color infrared reversal film

During exposure, light selectively sensitizes each of the three wavelength-sensitive layers; an external blue-blocking filter is used

After development, with false-color remapping

Color infrared reversal films share a similar three-layer emulsion structure with conventional color reversal films, with the blue-sensitive layer replaced by an infrared-sensitive layer, and different dyes used for each of the layers. An external yellow photographic filter is used (Wratten #12 or equivalent) to block the blue and violet wavelengths, which results in a false-color image by translating or remapping the captured spectrum (from green through infrared) to the visible spectrum: Infrared wavelengths are mapped to the red color, even though the infrared wavelengths are not normally visible. Similarly, visible red wavelengths are remapped to green, and visible green band wavelengths are remapped to blue. The filter and color remapping means visible blue and violet wavelengths are not captured. The infrared-sensitive layer will form cyan dyes (negative-red), while the green-sensitive layer will form yellow dyes (negative-blue) and the red-sensitive layer will form magenta dyes (negative-green).

The external yellow filter is used because each emulsion layer in color films (both conventional and infrared) has an inherent sensitivity for short-wavelength radiation (blue and violet visible wavelengths of light) due to the silver halide chemistry. Since there is no blue-sensitive layer, color infrared films also omit the internal yellow filter layer built into conventional color films to protect the following layers. This requires photographers to use an external blue-blocking filter to absorb blue and violet wavelengths of light, which gives the filter a yellow color.

'False-color' (remapped) infrared film examples

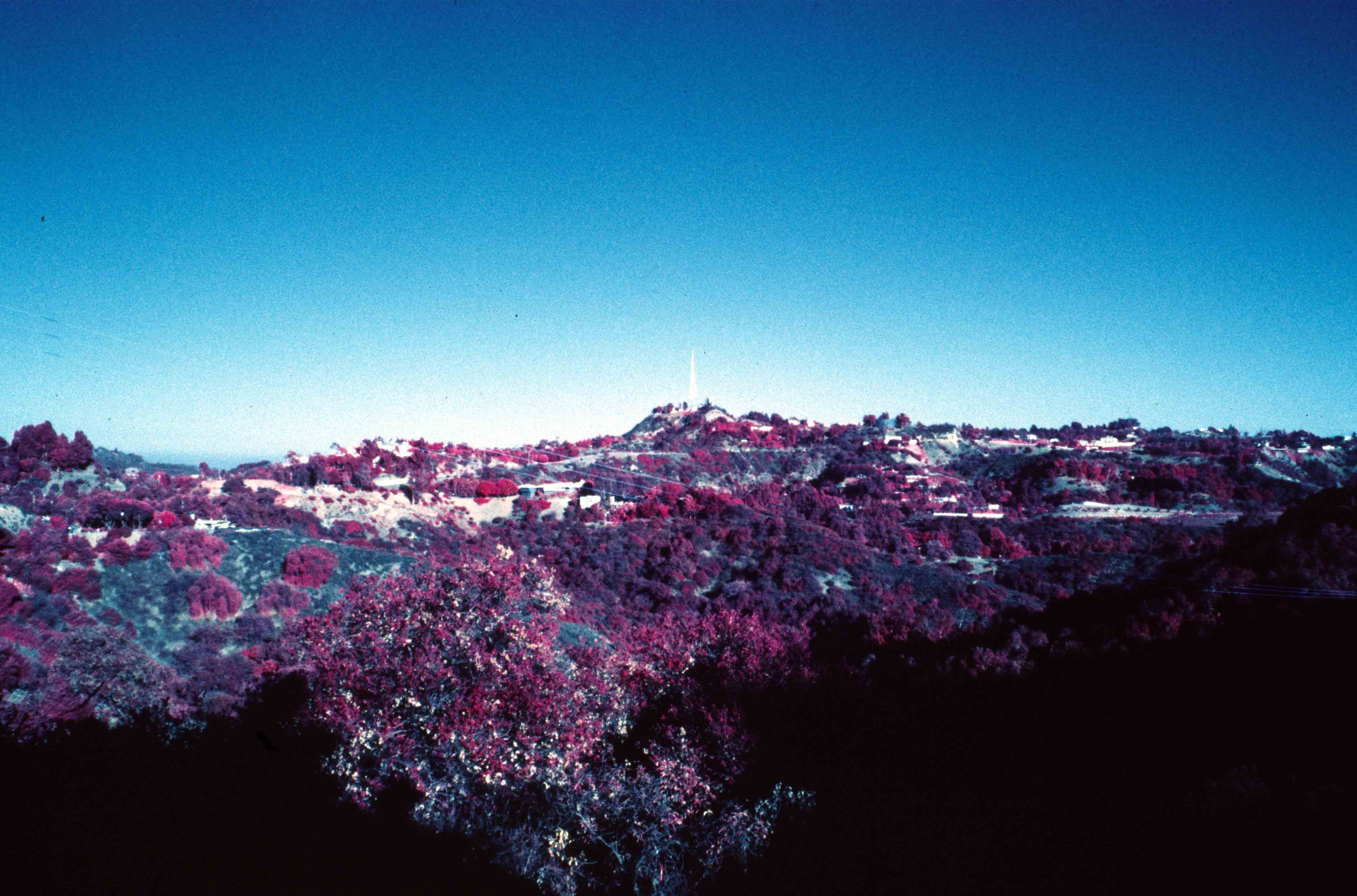
View of the Hollywood Hills. Kodak Infrared color slide film, no filter used and developed with E-6 process

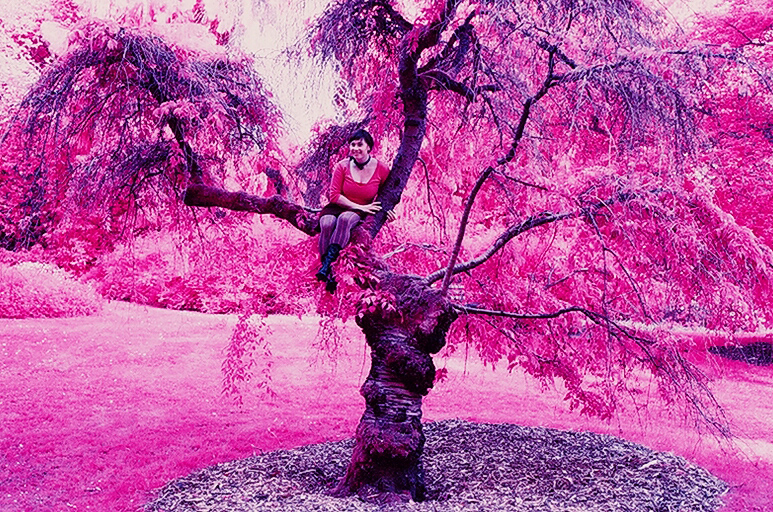
An example of color infrared

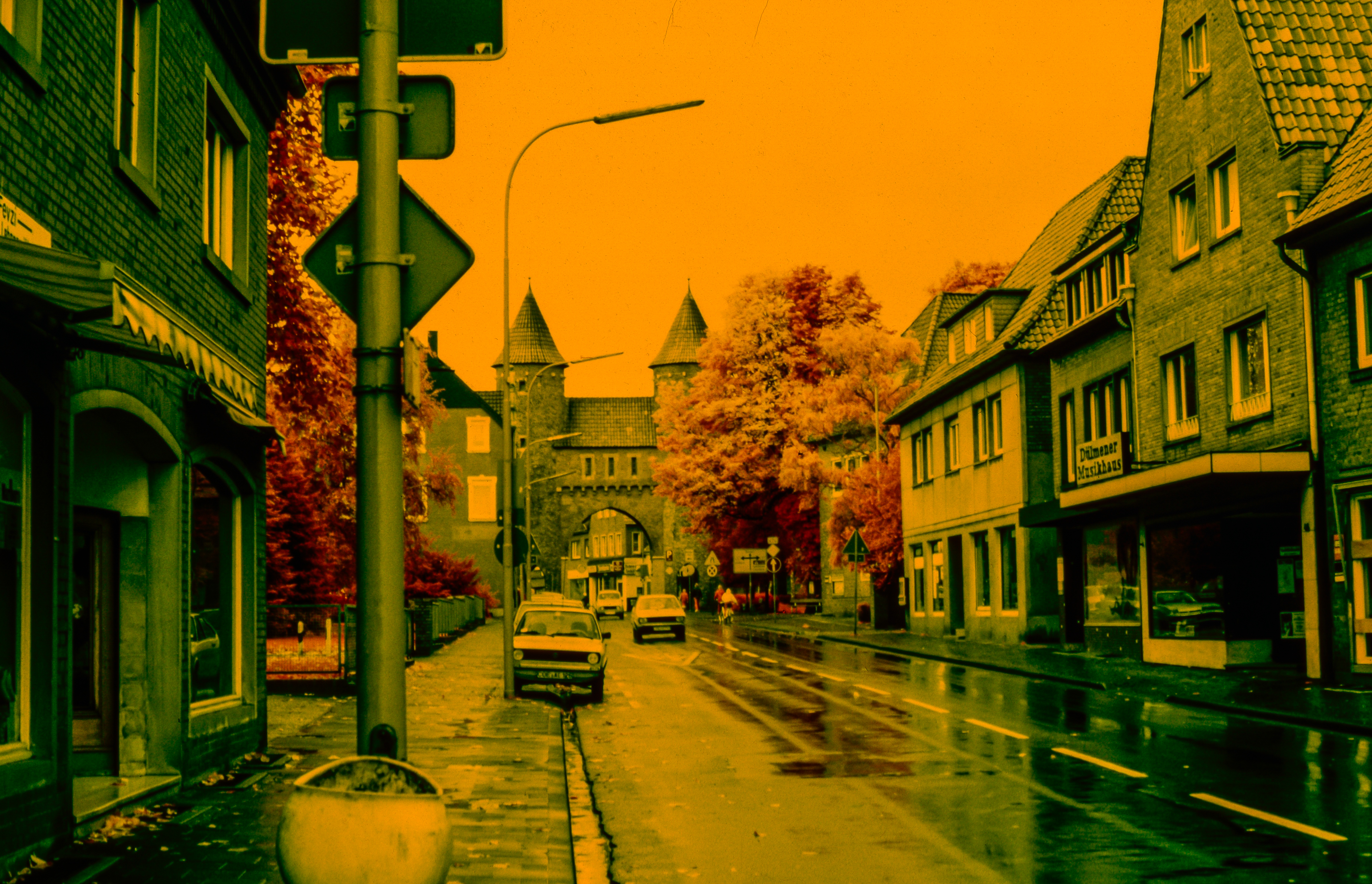
Lüdinghauser Tor in Dülmen (1981); remapped false color represents infrared wavelengths (as reflected by foliage) as shades of red

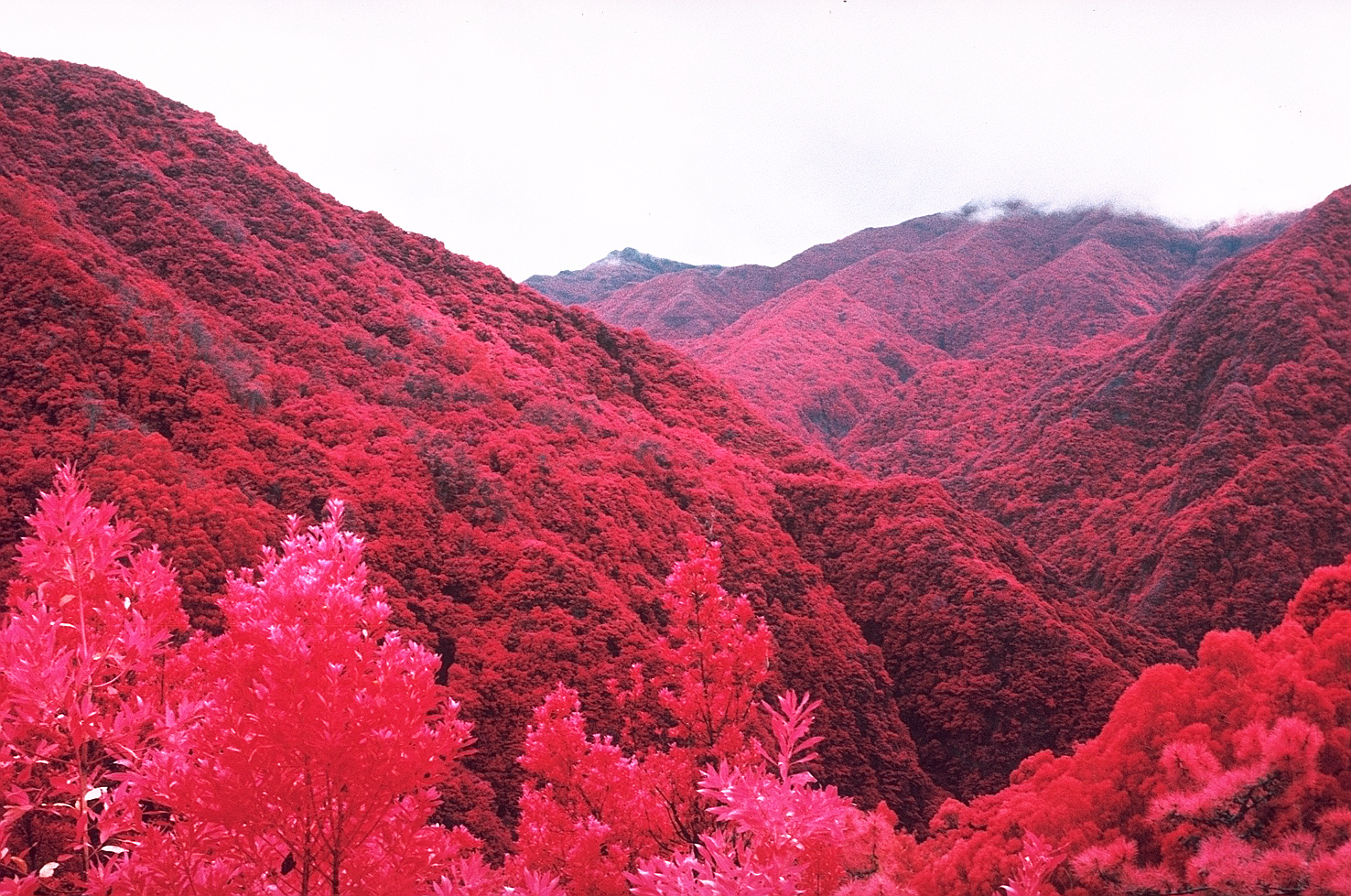
Ribiera da Janela Valley on Madeira Island, using Kodak EIR (2003)

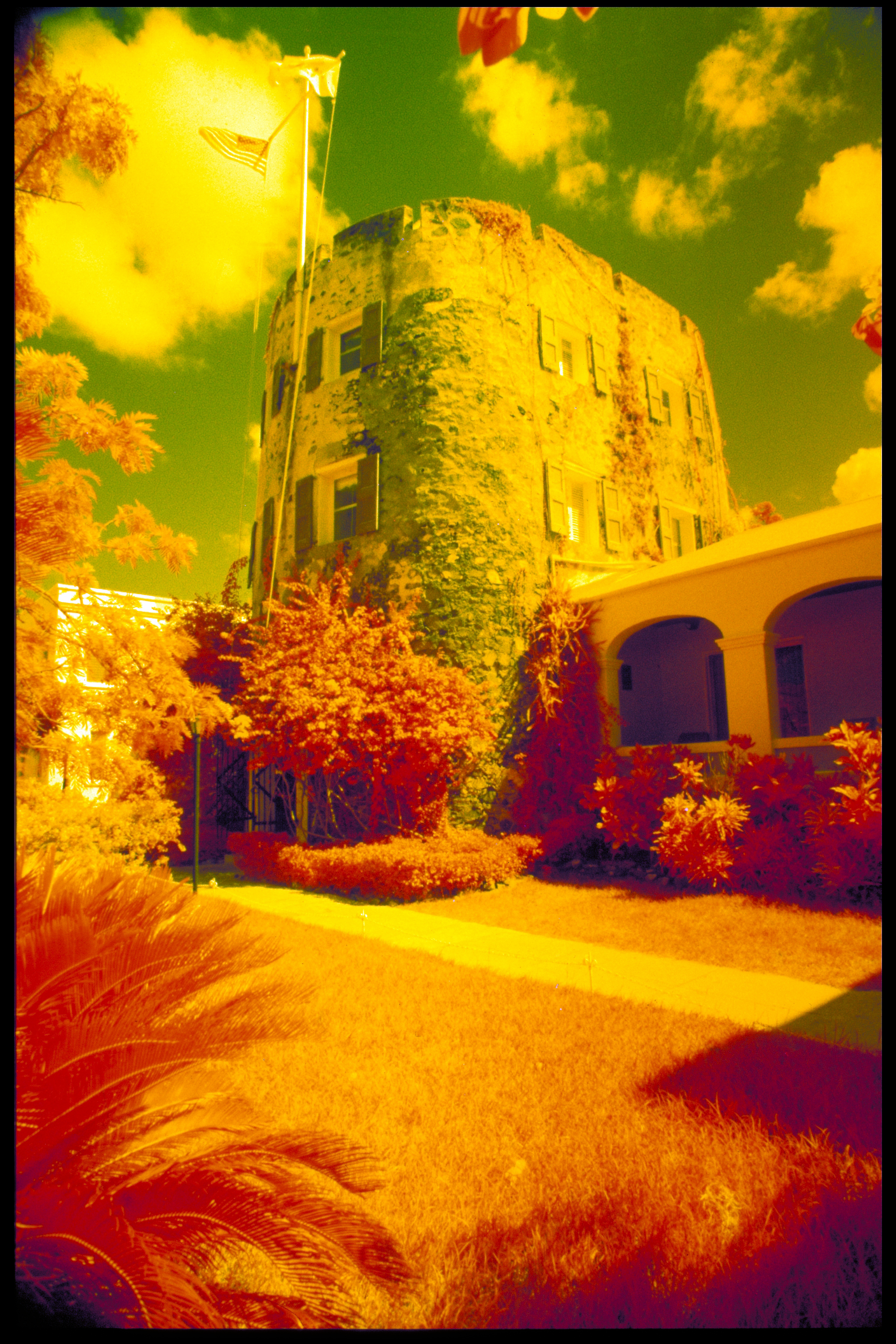
Bluebeard's Castle, Charlotte Amalie (1980)

Early color infrared films were developed in the older E-4 process, but Kodak later manufactured a color transparency film that could be developed in standard E-6 chemistry, although more accurate results were obtained by developing using the AR-5 process. Like HIE, EIR uses a clear polyester film base and must be loaded in complete darkness. In general, color infrared does not need to be refocused to the infrared index mark on the lens.

Kodak EIR loses its infrared sensitivity as it ages, giving photographs a cyan cast, as fewer grains in the infrared-sensitive (cyan-forming) layer will be sensitized. Anecdotally, EIR is most sensitive up to approximately 21 days after purchase, and stabilizes at a decreased sensitivity thereafter.

=== Availability ===
Kodak discontinued production of HIE Infrared 35 mm film at the end of 2007, stating that, "Demand for these products has been declining significantly in recent years, and it is no longer practical to continue to manufacture given the low volume, the age of the product formulations and the complexity of the processes involved." At the time it was discontinued, HIE Infrared 135-36 was available at a street price of around $12.00 a roll at US mail order outlets.

Also in 2007, Kodak announced that production of the 35 mm version of their color infrared film (Ektachrome Professional Infrared/EIR) would cease as there was insufficient demand.

In 2008, Los Angeles photographer, Dean Bennici started cutting and hand rolling Aerochrome color Infrared film. Most Aerochrome medium and large format which exists today came directly from his lab. The trend in infrared photography continues to gain momentum with the success of photographer Richard Mosse and multiple users all around the world.

Since 2011, all formats of color infrared film have been discontinued. Specifically, Aerochrome 1443 and SO-734.

== Digital cameras ==
Digital infrared photograph examples

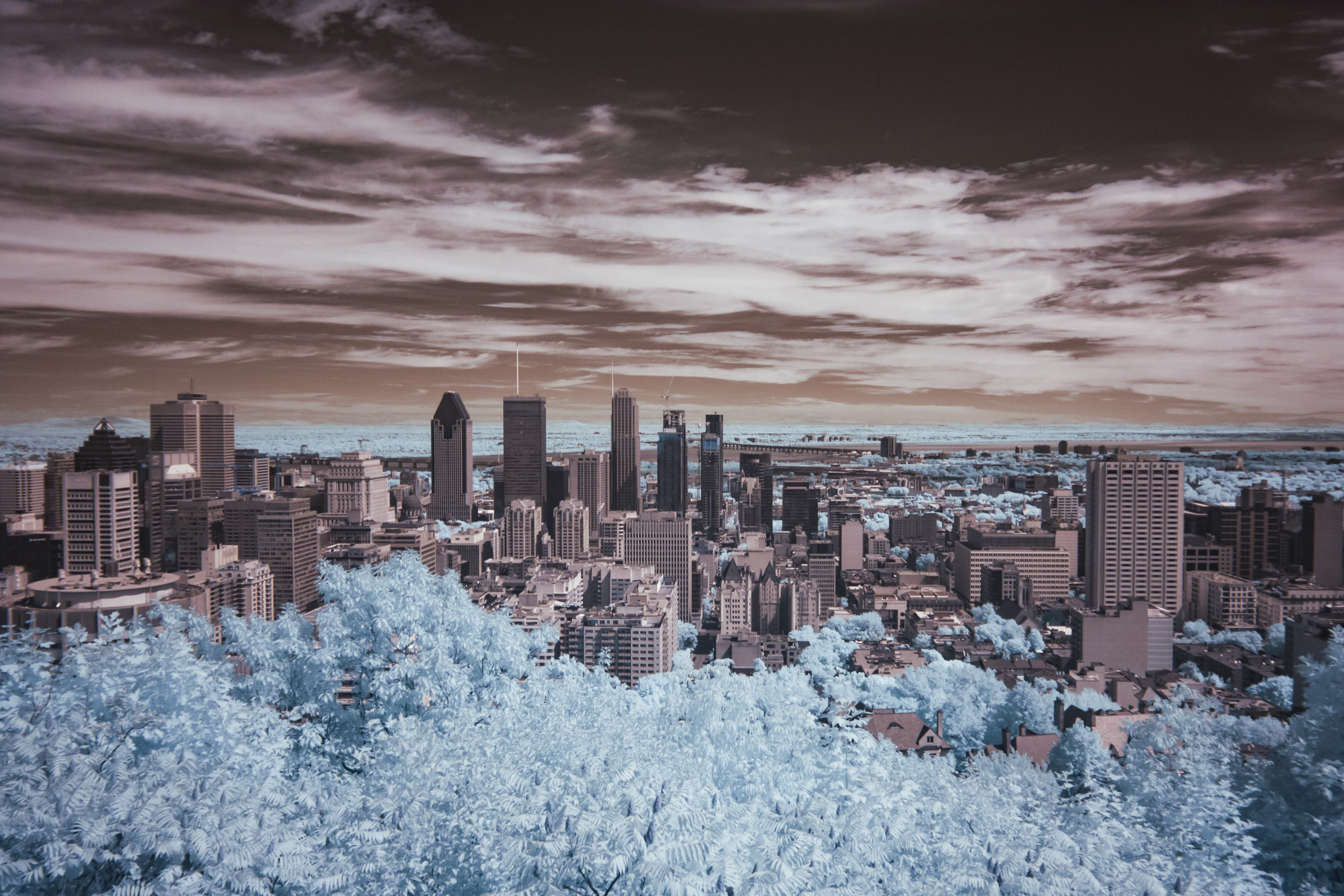
A view in infrared of Montréal as seen from Mont Royal, taken with filter made of a floppy disk

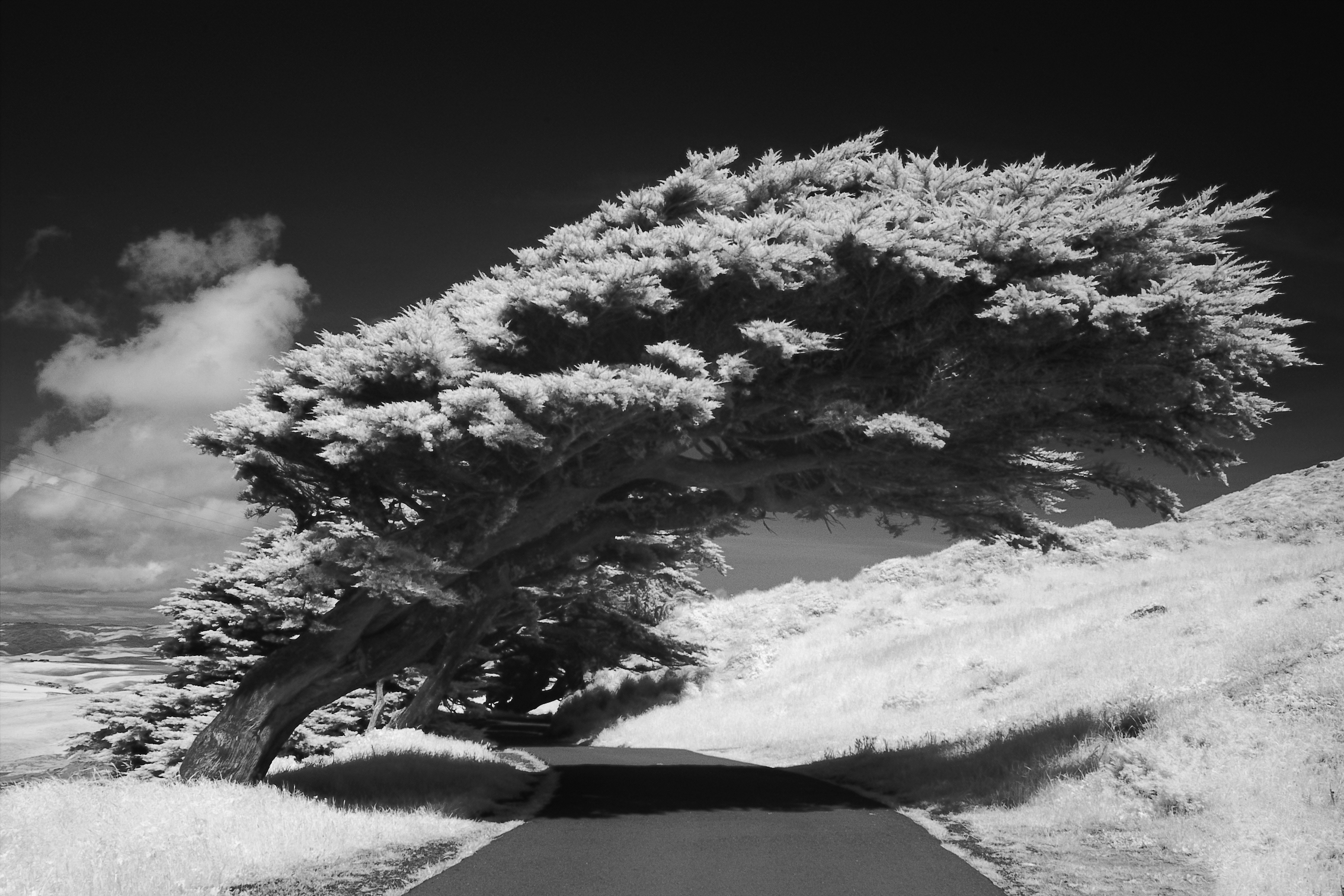
Bending Cypress: infrared shot by Sigma SD10 with B+W 093 filter, ISO 100, f/8, 1/160 s

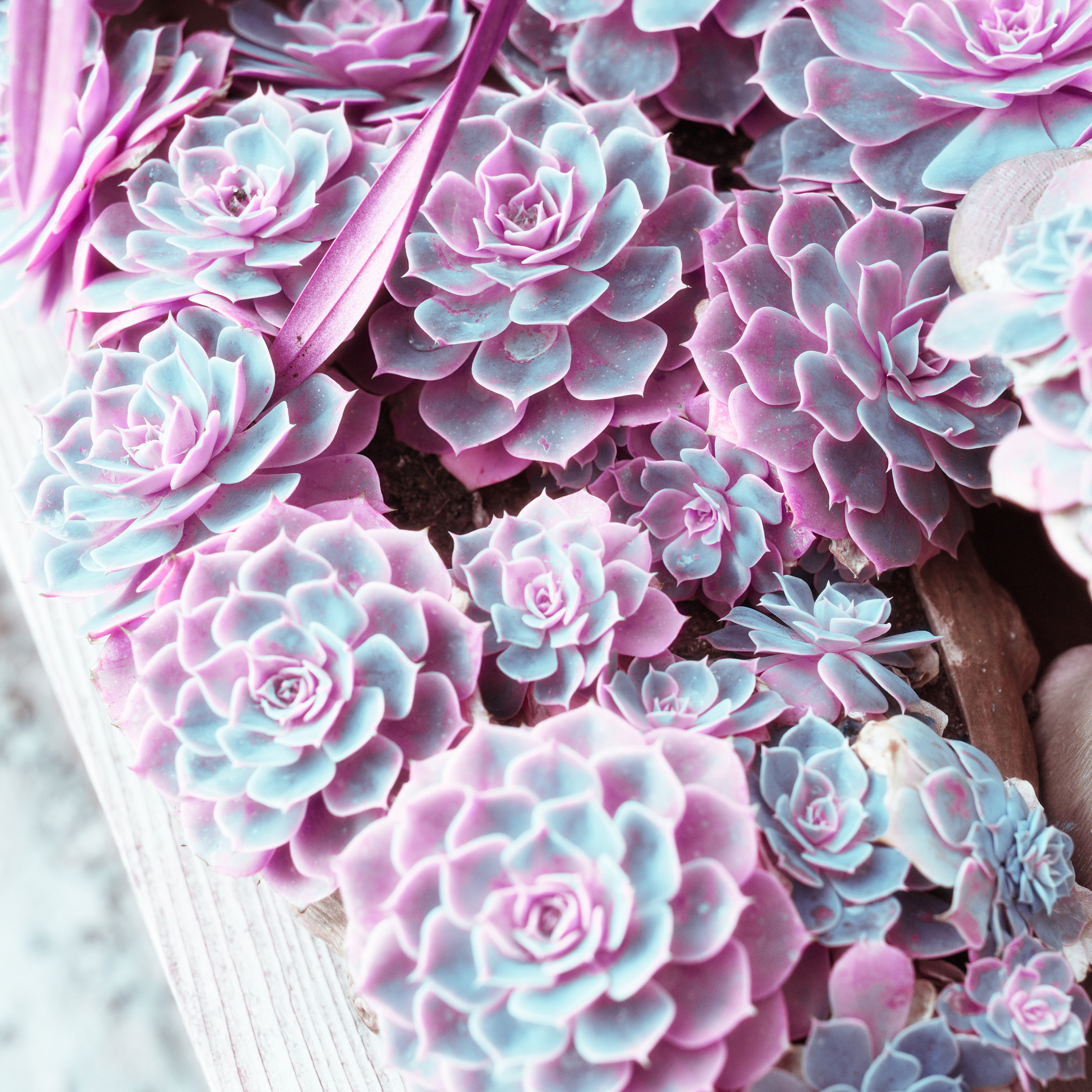
Digital infrared using a 50mm lens, D810 and the program Exposure. Infrared photography typically produces false-color artifacts, such as turning greens into pinks and purples as shown in this example.

Digital camera sensors are inherently sensitive to infrared light, which could interfere with normal photography by confusing the autofocus calculations, because infrared light wavelengths may focus at a different point than visible light wavelengths, or by softening the image, if the red channel becomes oversaturated. Also, some clothing is transparent in the infrared, leading to unintended (at least to the manufacturer) uses of video cameras. Thus, to improve image quality and protect privacy, many digital cameras have infrared blockers or hot mirrors installed in front of their sensors. Depending on the subject matter, adding an infrared-passing filter to the lens may not be practical with these cameras because the exposure times become overly long, often in the range of 30 seconds, creating noise and motion blur in the final image. However, for some subject matter the long exposure does not matter or the motion blur effects actually add to the image. Some lenses will also show a 'hot spot' in the center of the image as their coatings are optimized for visible light and not for IR.

There is no currently available digital camera that will directly produce the same results as Kodak color infrared film although equivalent images can be produced using a full spectrum converted infrared digital camera and a Kolari Vision Color IR Chrome lens filter. Similar effects can be achieved by taking two exposures, one infrared and the other full-color, and combining in post-production. A yellow (minus-blue) filter can also be used, which produces a single image that can also be post-processed to emulate the Ektachrome look. The color images produced by digital still cameras using infrared-pass filters are not equivalent to those produced on color infrared film. The colors result from varying amounts of infrared passing through the color filters on the photo sites, further amended by the Bayer filtering. While this makes such images unsuitable for the kind of applications for which the film was used, such as remote sensing of plant health, the resulting color tonality has proved popular artistically.

Color digital infrared, as part of full spectrum photography is gaining popularity. The ease of creating a softly colored photo with infrared characteristics has found interest among hobbyists and professionals.

=== Hot mirror removal ===
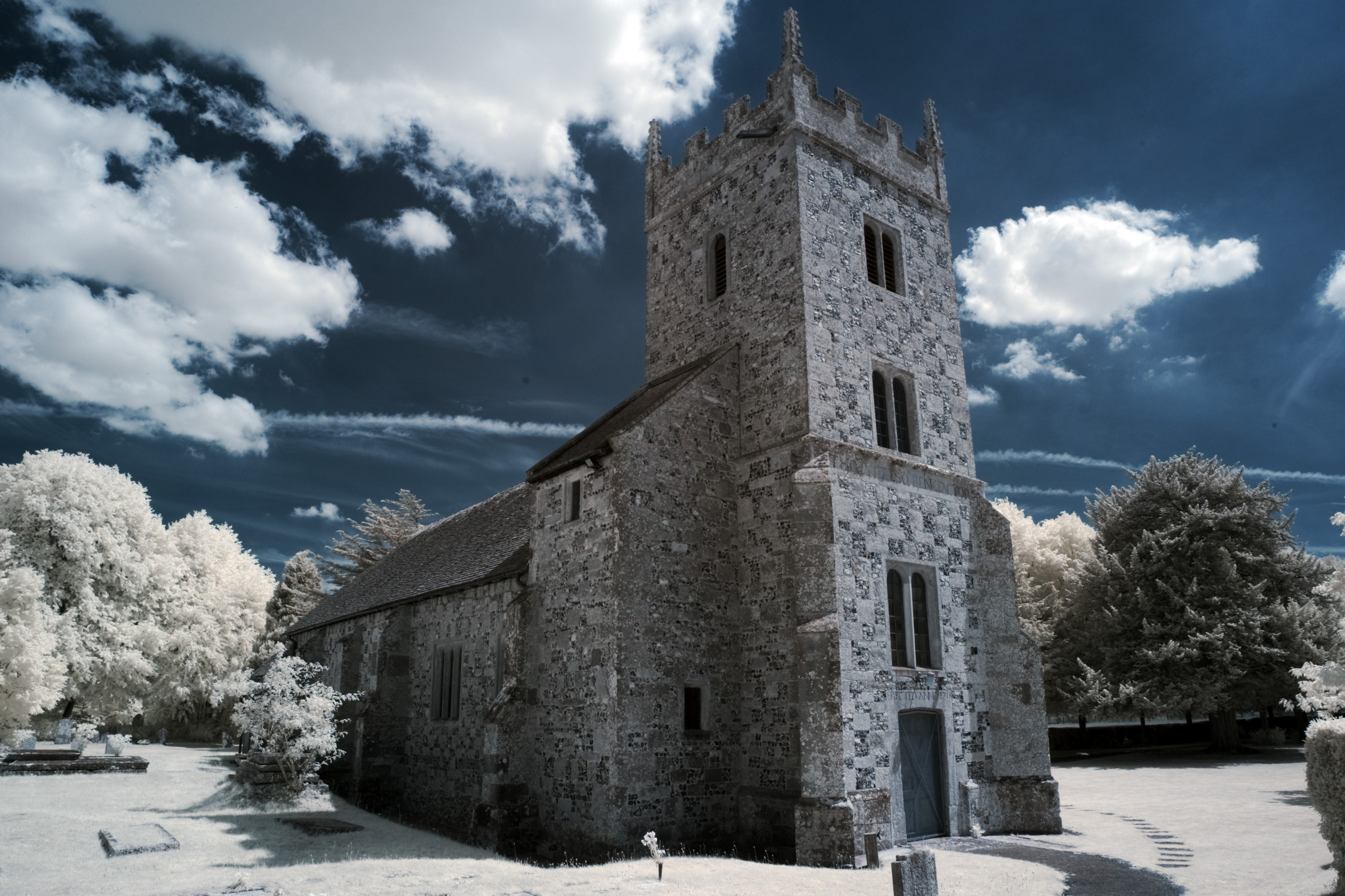
An example of color digital infrared photography. The camera's infrared blocking filter has been removed. Red and blue channels have been swapped for more conventional sky color.

One method of infrared photography using digital cameras is to remove the infrared blocker in front of the sensor and replace it with a glass cover that either removes or restricts visible light (infrared-only conversion) or one that passes infrared wavelengths ("full spectrum" conversion). This filter is behind the mirror of DSLRs, so the camera can be used normally - handheld, normal shutter speeds, normal composition through the viewfinder, and focus, all work like a normal camera. Metering works but is not always accurate because of the difference between visible and infrared refraction. When the IR blocker is removed, many lenses which did display a hotspot cease to do so, and become perfectly usable for infrared photography. Additionally, because the red, green and blue micro-filters remain and have transmissions not only in their respective color but also in the infrared, enhanced infrared color may be recorded.

Since the Bayer filters in most digital cameras may also absorb a significant fraction of the infrared light, converted cameras are sometimes not very sensitive to infrared wavelengths and can sometimes produce false colors in the images. An alternative approach is to use a Foveon X3 sensor, which does not have absorptive filters on it; the Sigma SD10 DSLR has a removable IR blocking filter and dust protector, which can be simply omitted or replaced by a deep red or complete visible light blocking filter. The Sigma SD14 has an IR/UV blocking filter that can be removed/installed without tools. The result is a very sensitive digital IR camera.

While it is common to use a filter that blocks almost all visible light, the wavelength sensitivity of a digital camera without internal infrared blocking is such that a variety of artistic results can be obtained with more conventional filtration. For example, a very dark neutral density filter can be used (such as the Hoya ND400) which passes a very small amount of visible light compared to the near-infrared it allows through. Wider filtration permits a SLR viewfinder to be used and also passes more varied color information to the sensor without necessarily reducing the Wood effect. Wider filtration is however likely to reduce other infrared artefacts such as haze penetration and darkened skies. This technique mirrors the methods used by infrared film photographers where black-and-white infrared film was often used with a deep red filter rather than a visually opaque one.

=== Post-processing ===
Another common technique with near-infrared filters is to swap blue and red channels in software (e.g. Adobe Photoshop), which retains much of the characteristic "white foliage" while rendering skies a glorious blue.

Phase One digital camera backs can be ordered in a modified form suited for infrared photography.

== Applications and specific implementations ==
Digital infrared applications

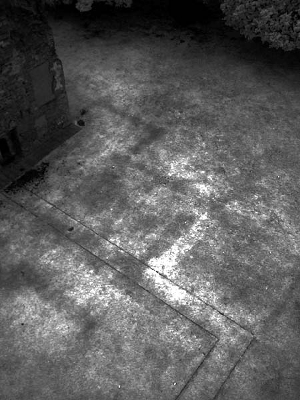
An example of the use of infrared photography in aerial archaeology to delineate sub-surface features

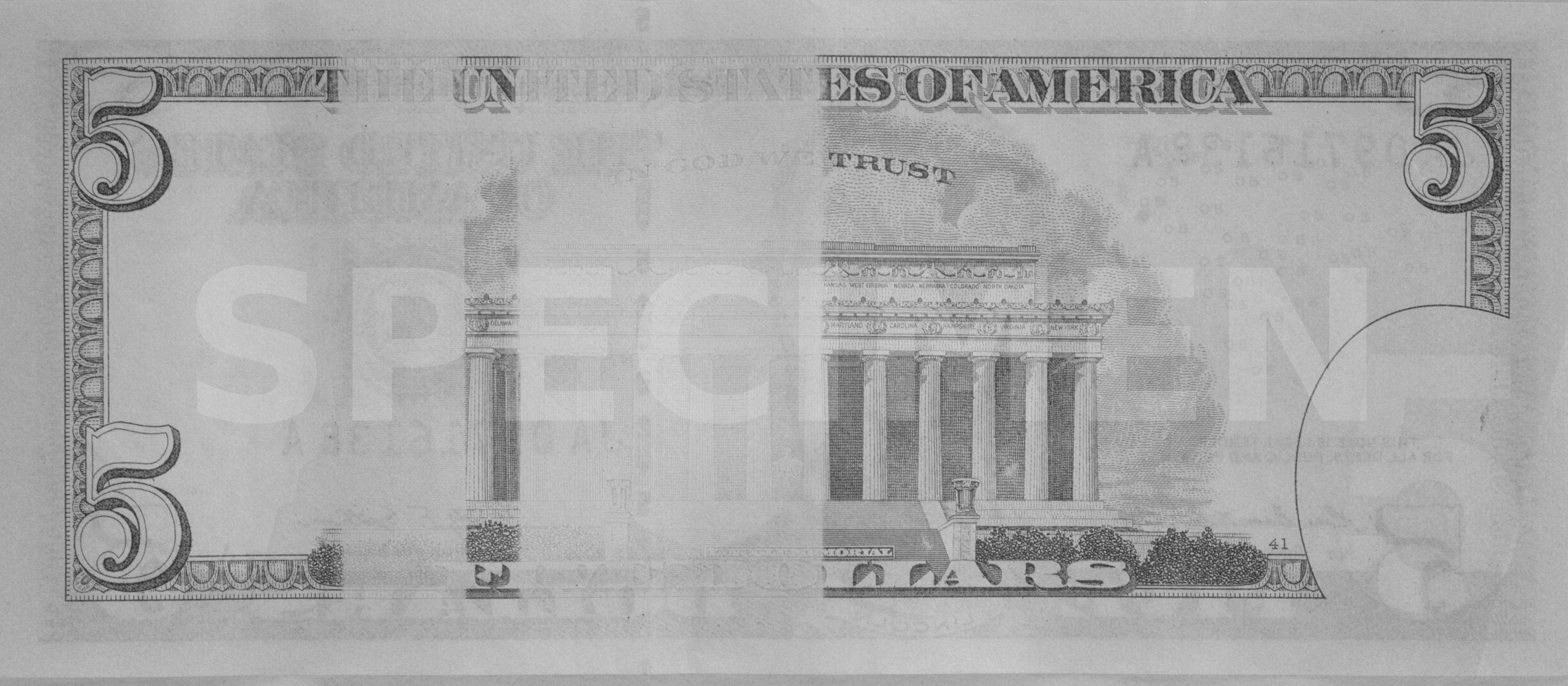
The reverse of the United States five-dollar bill has two rectangular strips that are blanked out when viewed in the infrared spectrum, as seen in this image taken by an infrared camera.

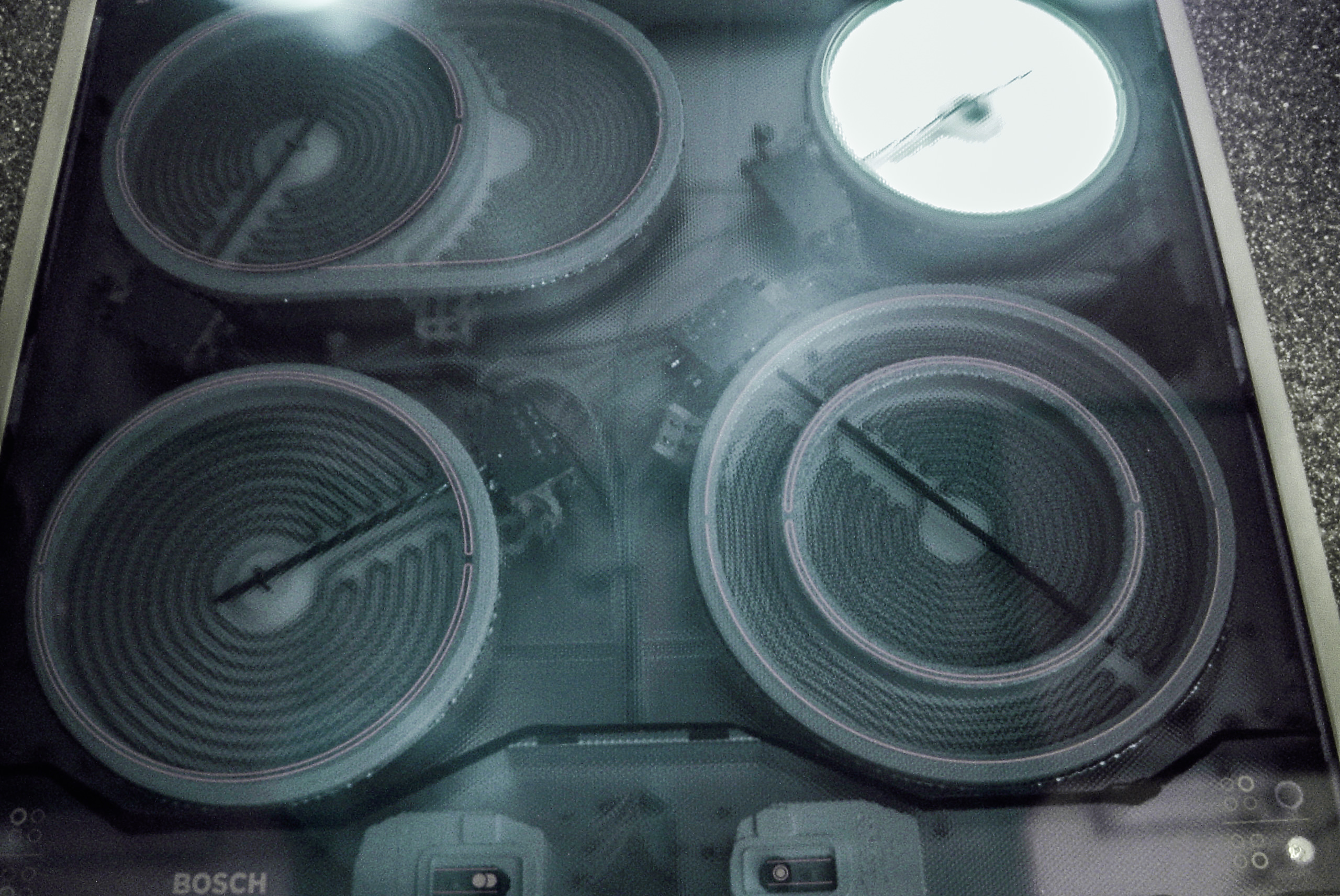
Nightshot infrared photography of a stove with 600 nm red-filter and polarizing filter at daylight

Thermographic image of coffee cup

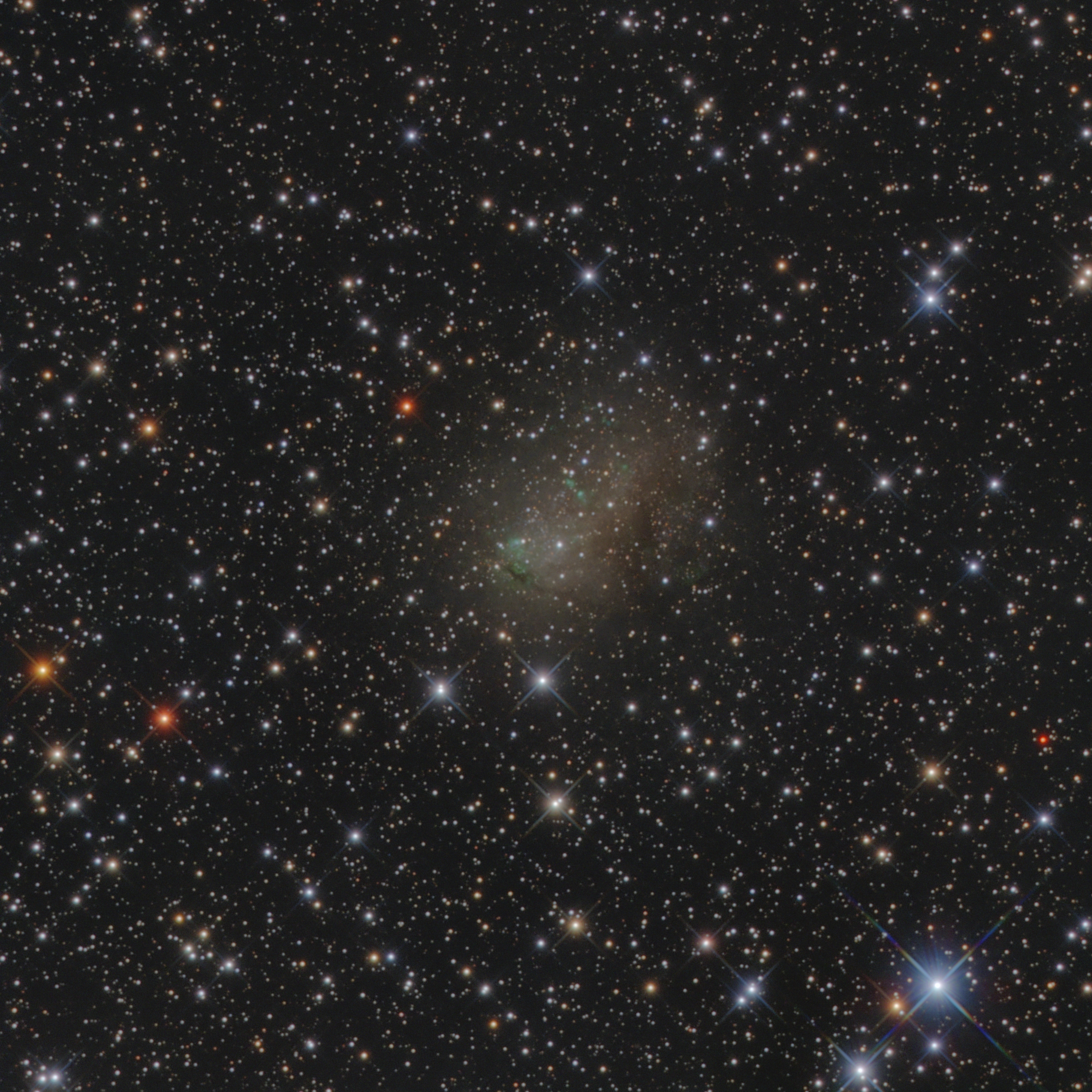
The starburst galaxy IC 10 is hidden behind dust in the Milky Way, but infrared light is less strongly absorbed by dust than visible light. Green patches in the galaxy are its star-forming H II regions.

The health of foliage can be determined from the relative strengths of green and infrared light reflected using color infrared film; this shows in color infrared as a shift from red (healthy) towards magenta (unhealthy).

Several Sony cameras had a feature branded as Night Shot, which physically moves the blocking filter away from the light path, making the cameras very sensitive to infrared light. Soon after its development, this facility was 'restricted' by Sony to make it difficult for people to take photos that saw through clothing. To do this the iris is opened fully and exposure duration is limited to long times of more than 1/30 second or so. It is possible to shoot infrared but neutral density filters must be used to reduce the camera's sensitivity and the long exposure times mean that care must be taken to avoid camera-shake artifacts.

Fuji have produced digital cameras for use in forensic criminology and medicine which have no infrared blocking filter. The first camera, designated the S3 PRO UVIR, also had extended ultraviolet sensitivity (digital sensors are usually less sensitive to UV than to IR). Optimum UV sensitivity requires special lenses, but ordinary lenses usually work well for IR. In 2007, FujiFilm introduced a new version of this camera, based on the Nikon D200/ FujiFilm S5 called the IS Pro, also able to take Nikon lenses. Fuji had earlier introduced a non-SLR infrared camera, the IS-1, a modified version of the FujiFilm FinePix S9100. Unlike the S3 PRO UVIR, the IS-1 does not offer UV sensitivity. FujiFilm restricts the sale of these cameras to professional users with their EULA specifically prohibiting "unethical photographic conduct".

Remote sensing and thermographic cameras are sensitive to longer wavelengths of infrared (see Infrared spectrum § Commonly used sub-division scheme). They may be multispectral and use a variety of technologies which may not resemble common camera or filter designs. Cameras sensitive to longer infrared wavelengths including those used in infrared astronomy often require cooling to reduce thermally induced dark currents in the sensor (see Dark current (physics)). Lower cost uncooled thermographic digital cameras operate in the Long Wave infrared band (see Thermographic camera). These cameras are generally used for building inspection or preventative maintenance but can be used for artistic pursuits as well, such as this image of a cup of coffee.

== See also ==
- FinePix IS Pro – Digital single lens reflex camera
- Monochrome photography – Photography in one color
- Ultraviolet photography – Photographic process using UV radiation
