= Photography =

Art and practice of creating images by recording light

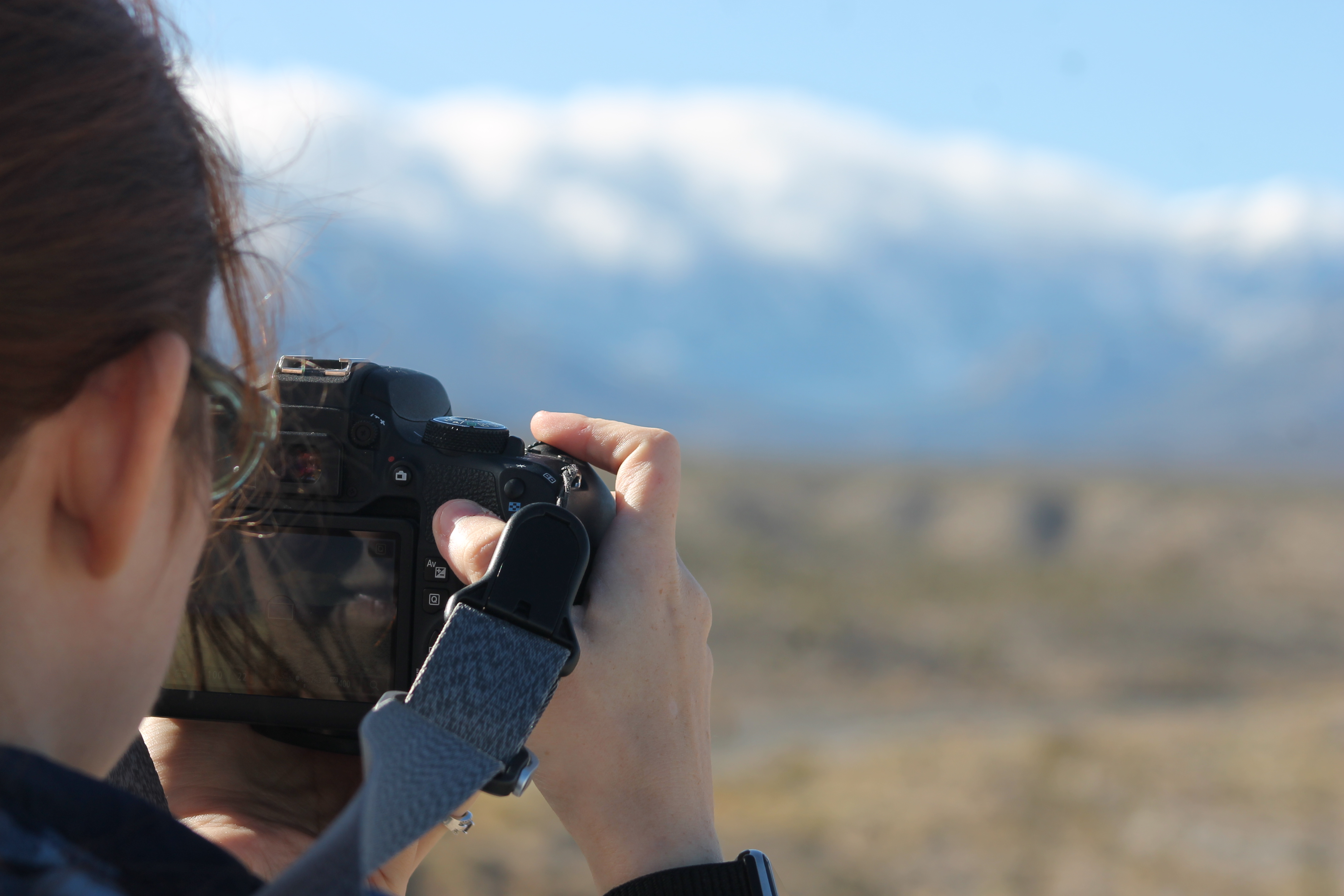
Photography of Sierra Nevada

Photography is the art, application, and practice of creating images by recording light, either electronically by means of an image sensor, or chemically by means of a light-sensitive material such as photographic film. It is employed in many fields of science, manufacturing (e.g., photolithography), and business, as well as its more direct uses for art, film and video production, recreational purposes, hobby, and mass communication. A person who operates a camera to capture or take photographs is called a photographer, while the captured image, also known as a photograph, is the result produced by the camera.

Typically, a lens is used to focus the light reflected or emitted from objects into a real image on the light-sensitive surface inside a camera during a timed exposure. With an electronic image sensor, this produces an electrical charge at each pixel, which is electronically processed and stored in a digital image file for subsequent display or processing. The result with photographic emulsion is an invisible latent image, which is later chemically developed into a visible image, either negative or positive, depending on the purpose of the photographic material and the method of processing. A negative image on film is traditionally used to photographically create a positive image on a paper base, known as a print, either by using an enlarger or by contact printing.

Before the emergence of digital photography, photographs that utilized film had to be developed to produce negatives or projectable slides, and negatives had to be printed as positive images, usually in enlarged form. This was typically done by photographic laboratories, but many amateur photographers, students, and photographic artists did their own processing.

== Etymology ==
The word "photography" was created from the Greek roots φωτός (phōtós), genitive of φῶς (phōs), "light" and γραφή (graphé) "representation by means of lines" or "drawing", together meaning "drawing with light".

Several people may have coined the same new term from these roots independently. Hércules Florence, a French painter and inventor living in Campinas, Brazil, used the French form of the word, photographie, in private notes which a Brazilian historian believes were written in 1834. This claim is widely reported but is not yet largely recognized internationally. The first use of the word by Florence became widely known after the research of Boris Kossoy in 1980.

On 25 February 1839, the German newspaper Vossische Zeitung published an article titled Photographie, discussing several priority claims, especially that of Henry Fox Talbot's, in relation to Daguerre's claim of invention. The article is the earliest known occurrence of the word in public print. It was signed "J.M.", believed to have been Berlin astronomer Johann von Maedler. The astronomer John Herschel is also credited with coining the word, independent of Talbot, in 1839.

The inventors Nicéphore Niépce, Talbot, and Louis Daguerre seem not to have known or used the word "photography", but referred to their processes as "Heliography" (Niépce), "Photogenic Drawing"/"Talbotype"/"Calotype" (Talbot), and "Daguerreotype" (Daguerre).

== History ==
=== Precursor technologies ===
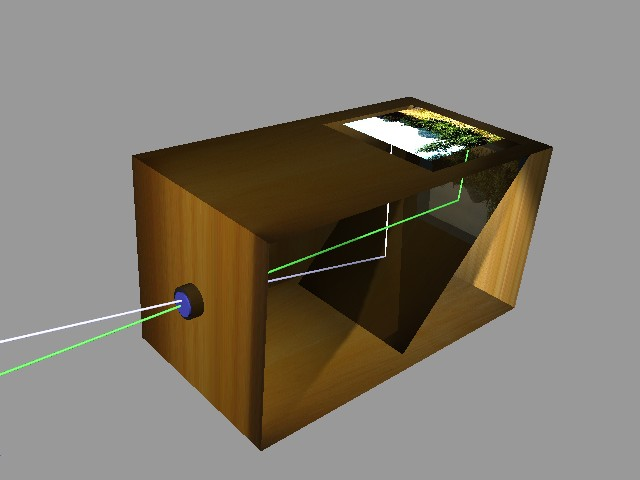
A camera obscura used for drawing

Photography is the result of combining several technical discoveries relating to seeing an image and capturing the image. The discovery of the camera obscura ("dark chamber" in Latin) which provides an image of a scene dates back to ancient China. Greek mathematicians Aristotle and Euclid independently described a camera obscura in the 5th and 4th centuries BCE. In the 6th century CE, Byzantine mathematician Anthemius of Tralles used a type of camera obscura in his experiments.

The Arab physicist Ibn al-Haytham (Alhazen) (965–1040) also invented a camera obscura as well as the first true pinhole camera. The invention of the camera has been traced back to the work of Ibn al-Haytham. While the effects of a single light passing through a pinhole had been described earlier, Ibn al-Haytham gave the first correct analysis of the camera obscura, including the first geometrical and quantitative descriptions of the phenomenon, and was the first to use a screen in a dark room so that an image from one side of a hole in the surface could be projected onto a screen on the other side. He also first understood the relationship between the focal point and the pinhole, and performed early experiments with afterimages, laying the foundations for the invention of photography in the 19th century.

Leonardo da Vinci mentions natural camerae obscurae that are formed by dark caves on the edge of a sunlit valley. A hole in the cave wall will act as a pinhole camera and project a laterally reversed, upside down image on a piece of paper. Renaissance painters used the camera obscura which, in fact, gives the optical rendering in color that dominates Western art. It is a box with a small hole in one side, which allows specific light rays to enter, projecting an inverted image onto a viewing screen or paper.

The birth of photography was then concerned with inventing means to capture and keep the image produced by the camera obscura. Albertus Magnus (1193–1280) discovered silver nitrate, and Georg Fabricius (1516–1571) discovered silver chloride.

Daniele Barbaro described a diaphragm in 1566. Wilhelm Homberg described how light darkened some chemicals (photochemical effect) in 1694. Around 1717, Johann Heinrich Schulze used a light-sensitive slurry to capture images of cut-out letters on a bottle and on that basis many German sources and some international ones credit Schulze as the inventor of photography. The fiction book Giphantie, published in 1760, by French author Tiphaigne de la Roche, described what can be interpreted as photography.

In June 1802, British inventor Thomas Wedgwood made the first known attempt to capture the image in a camera obscura by means of a light-sensitive substance. He used paper or white leather treated with silver nitrate. Although he succeeded in capturing the shadows of objects placed on the surface in direct sunlight, and even made shadow copies of paintings on glass, it was reported in 1802 that "the images formed by means of a camera obscura have been found too faint to produce, in any moderate time, an effect upon the nitrate of silver." The shadow images eventually darkened all over.

=== Invention ===
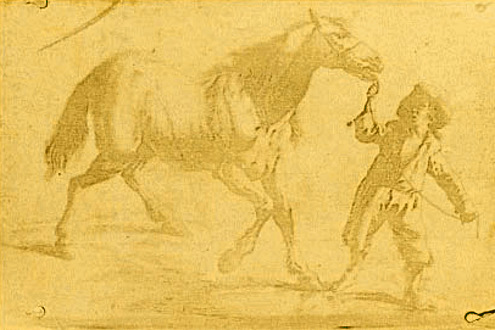
Earliest known surviving heliographic engraving, 1825, printed from a metal plate made by Nicéphore Niépce. The plate was exposed under an ordinary engraving and copied it by photographic means. This was a step towards the first permanent photograph taken with a camera.

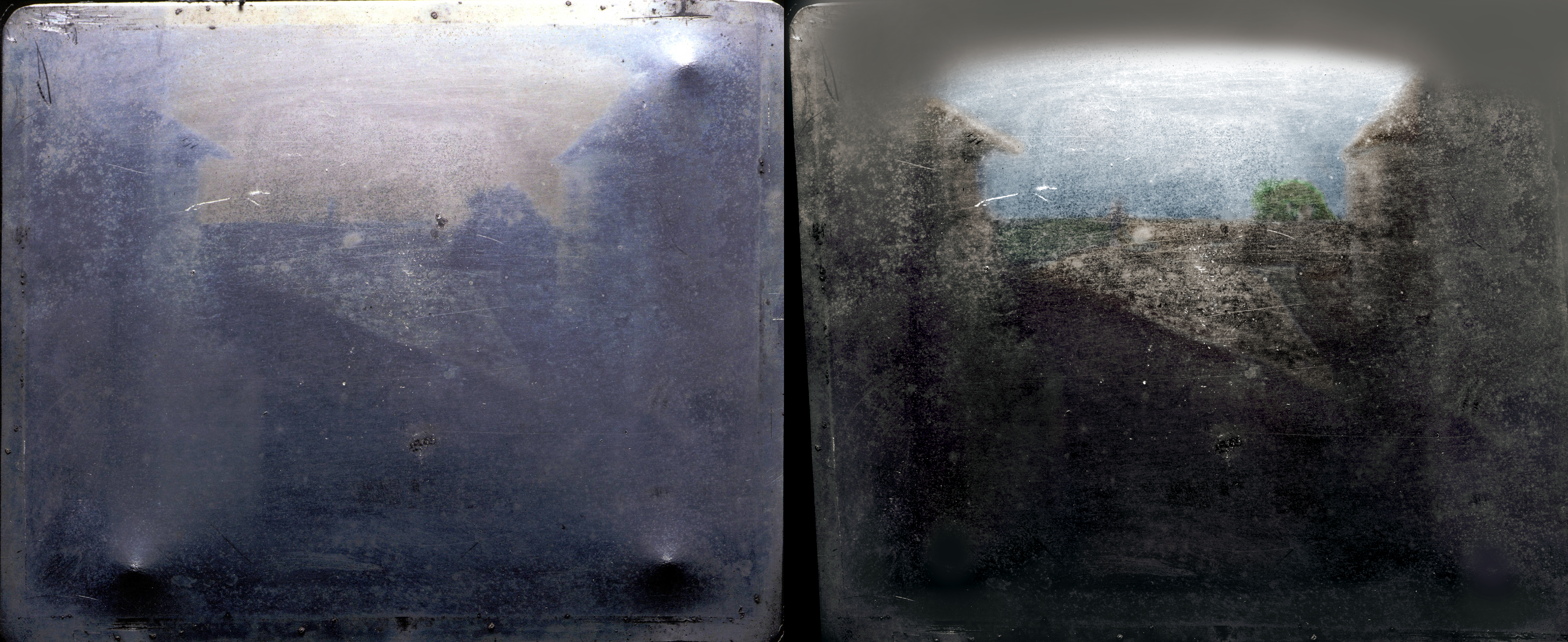
View from the Window at Le Gras, 1826, the earliest surviving camera photograph. Original plate (left) and colorized reoriented enhancement (right).

The first permanent photoetching was an image produced in 1822 by the French inventor Nicéphore Niépce, but it was destroyed in a later attempt to make prints from it. Niépce was successful again in 1825. In 1826 he made the View from the Window at Le Gras, the earliest surviving photograph from nature (i.e., of the image of a real-world scene, as formed in a camera obscura by a lens).

Because Niépce's camera photographs required an extremely long exposure (at least eight hours and probably several days), he sought to greatly improve his bitumen process or replace it with one that was more practical. In partnership with Louis Daguerre, he worked out post-exposure processing methods that produced visually superior results and replaced the bitumen with a more light-sensitive resin, but hours of exposure in the camera were still required. With an eye to eventual commercial exploitation, the partners opted for total secrecy.

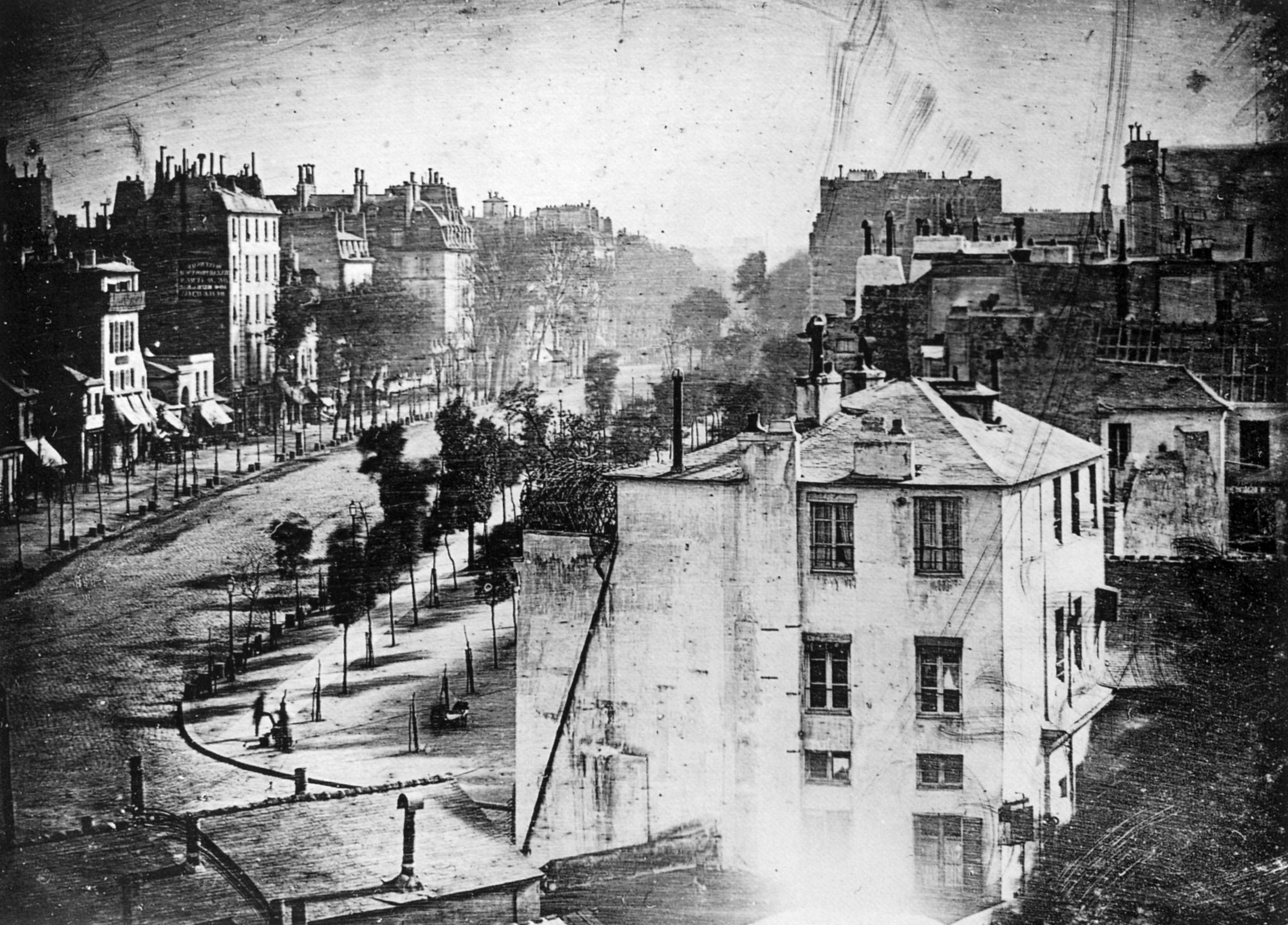
View of the Boulevard du Temple, a daguerreotype made by Louis Daguerre in 1838, is generally accepted as the earliest photograph to include people. It is a view of a busy street, but because the exposure lasted for several minutes the moving traffic left no trace. Only the two men near the bottom left corner, one of them apparently having his boots polished by the other, remained in one place long enough to be visible.

Niépce died in 1833 and Daguerre then redirected the experiments toward the light-sensitive silver halides, which Niépce had abandoned many years earlier because of his inability to make the images he captured with them light-fast and permanent. Daguerre's efforts culminated in what would later be named the daguerreotype process. The essential elements—a silver-plated surface sensitized by iodine vapor, developed by mercury vapor, and "fixed" with hot saturated salt water—were in place in 1837. The required exposure time was measured in minutes instead of hours. Daguerre took the earliest confirmed photograph of a person in 1838 while capturing a view of a Paris street: unlike the other pedestrian and horse-drawn traffic on the busy boulevard, which appears deserted, one man having his boots polished stood sufficiently still throughout the several-minutes-long exposure to be visible. The existence of Daguerre's process was publicly announced, without details, on 7 January 1839. The news created an international sensation. France soon agreed to pay Daguerre a pension in exchange for the right to present his invention to the world as the gift of France, which occurred when complete working instructions were unveiled on 19 August 1839. In that same year, American photographer Robert Cornelius is credited with taking the earliest surviving photographic self-portrait. Moreover, Daguerre informed the Academy of Science in Paris on 7 January 1840 of the invention.

In Brazil, Hercules Florence had started working out a silver-salt-based paper process in 1832, later naming it photographia, at least four years before John Herschel coined the English word photography. In 1834, having settled on silver nitrate on paper, a combination which had been the subject of experiments by Thomas Wedgwood around the year 1800, Florence's notebooks indicate that he eventually succeeded in creating light-fast, durable images. Partly because he never published his invention adequately, partly because he was an obscure inventor living in a remote and undeveloped province, Hércules Florence died, in Brazil, unrecognized internationally as one of the inventors of photography during his lifetime.

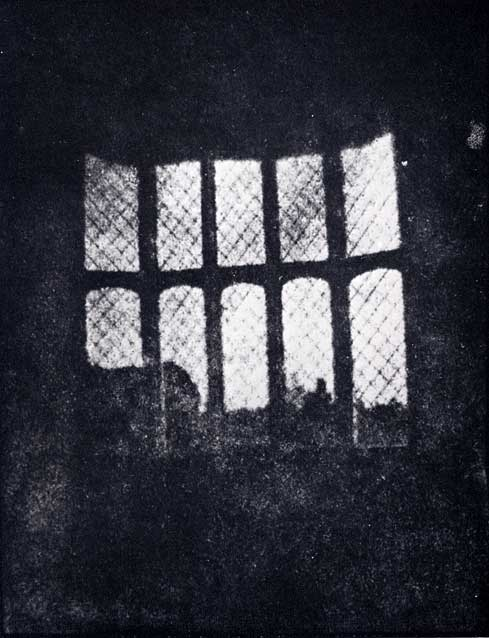
A latticed window in Lacock Abbey, England, photographed by William Fox Talbot in 1835. Shown here in positive form, this may be the oldest extant photographic negative made in a camera.

Meanwhile, a British inventor, William Fox Talbot, had succeeded in making crude but reasonably light-fast silver images on paper as early as 1834 but had kept his work secret. After reading about Daguerre's invention in January 1839, Talbot published his hitherto secret method in a paper to the Royal Society and set about improving on it. At first, like other pre-daguerreotype processes, Talbot's paper-based photography typically required hours-long exposures in the camera, but in 1840 he created the calotype process, which used the chemical development of a latent image to greatly reduce the exposure needed and compete with the daguerreotype. In both its original and calotype forms, Talbot's process, unlike Daguerre's, created a translucent negative which could be used to print multiple positive copies; this is the basis of most modern chemical photography up to the present day, as daguerreotypes could only be replicated by rephotographing them with a camera. Talbot's famous tiny paper negative of the Oriel window in Lacock Abbey, one of a number of camera photographs he made in the summer of 1835, may be the oldest camera negative in existence.

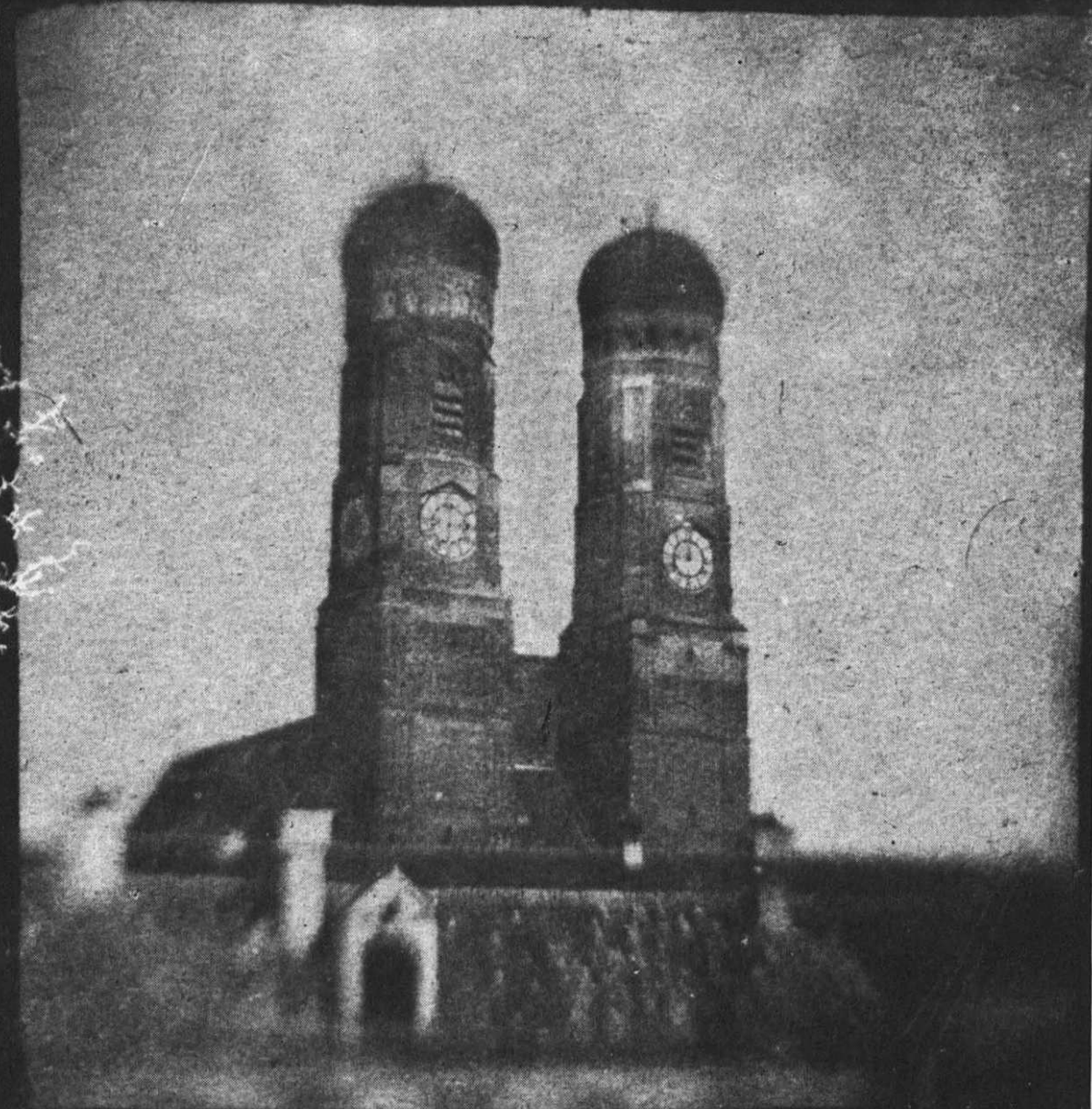
Franz von Kobell's silver chloride photograph of Frauenkirche from the Old Academy, March 1837

In March 1837, Franz von Kobell, used silver chloride and a cardboard camera to make pictures in negative of the Frauenkirche and other buildings in Munich, then taking another picture of the negative to get a positive, the actual black and white reproduction of a view on the object. In 1839, Kobell, together with Carl August von Steinheil, reported on their experiments to the Bavarian Academy of Sciences. The pictures produced were round with a diameter of 4 cm, the method was later named the "Steinheil method".

In France, Hippolyte Bayard invented his own process for producing direct positive paper prints and claimed to have invented photography earlier than Daguerre or Talbot.

British chemist John Herschel made many contributions to the new field. He invented the cyanotype process, later familiar as the "blueprint". He was the first to use the terms "photography", "negative" and "positive". He had discovered in 1819 that sodium thiosulphate was a solvent of silver halides, and in 1839 he informed Talbot (and, indirectly, Daguerre) that it could be used to "fix" silver-halide-based photographs and make them completely light-fast. He made the first glass negative in late 1839.

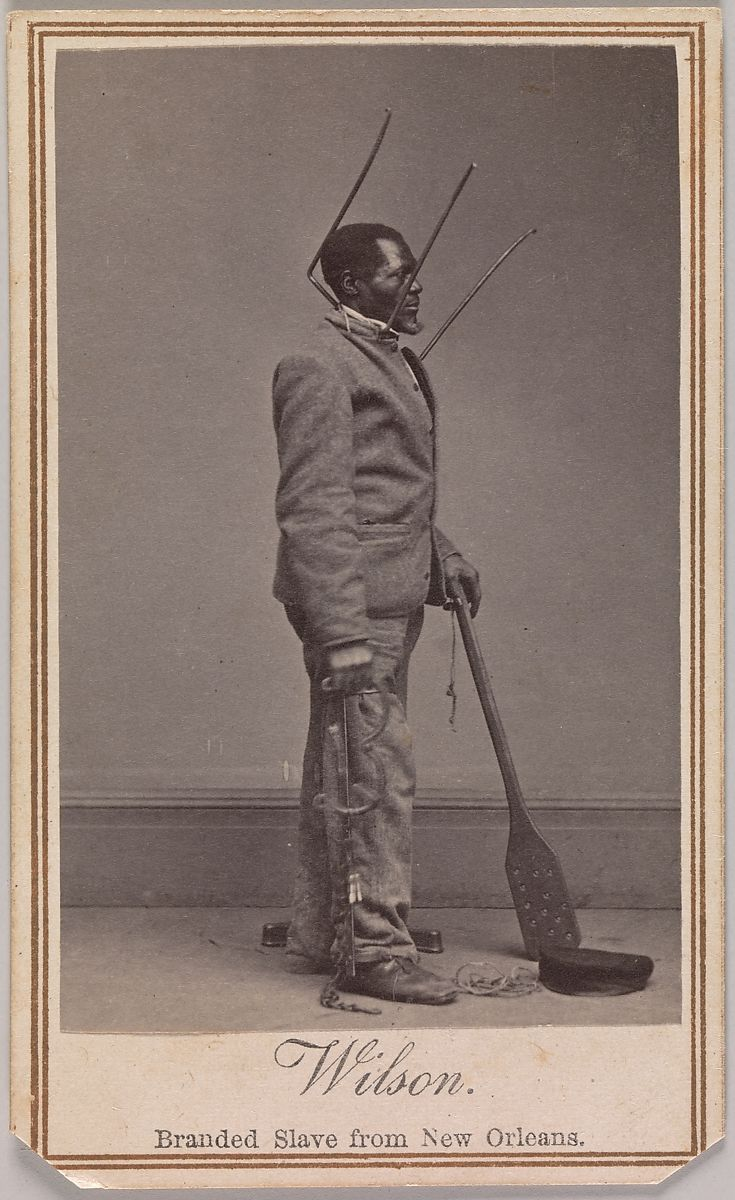
Wilson Chinn, a branded slave from Louisiana—per The New York Times, "one of the earliest and most dramatic examples of how the newborn medium of photography could change the course of history."

Advertisement for Campbell's Photograph Gallery from The Macon City Directory, c. 1877

In the March 1851 issue of The Chemist, Frederick Scott Archer published his wet plate collodion process. It became the most widely used photographic medium until the gelatin dry plate, introduced in the 1870s, eventually replaced it. There are three subsets to the collodion process; the Ambrotype (a positive image on glass), the Ferrotype or Tintype (a positive image on metal) and the glass negative, which was used to make positive prints on albumen or salted paper.

Many advances in photographic glass plates and printing were made during the rest of the 19th century. In 1891, Gabriel Lippmann introduced a process for making natural-color photographs based on the optical phenomenon of the interference of light waves. His scientifically elegant and important but ultimately impractical invention earned him the Nobel Prize in Physics in 1908.

Glass plates were the medium for most original camera photography from the late 1850s until the general introduction of flexible plastic films during the 1890s. Although the convenience of the film greatly popularized amateur photography, early films were somewhat more expensive and of markedly lower optical quality than their glass plate equivalents, and until the late 1910s they were not available in the large formats preferred by most professional photographers, so the new medium did not immediately or completely replace the old. Because of the superior dimensional stability of glass, the use of plates for some scientific applications, such as astrophotography, continued into the 1990s, and in the niche field of laser holography, it has persisted into the 21st century.

=== Film ===
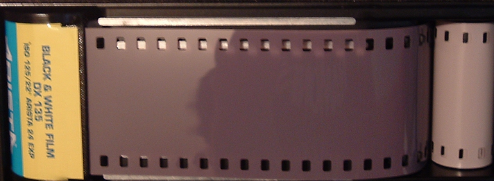
Undeveloped Arista black-and-white film, ISO 125/22°

Hurter and Driffield began pioneering work on the light sensitivity of photographic emulsions in 1876. Their work enabled the first quantitative measure of film speed to be devised.

The first flexible photographic roll film was marketed by George Eastman, founder of Kodak in 1885, but this original "film" was actually a coating on a paper base. As part of the processing, the image-bearing layer was stripped from the paper and transferred to a hardened gelatin support. The first transparent plastic roll film followed in 1889. It was made from highly flammable nitrocellulose known as nitrate film.

Although cellulose acetate or "safety film" had been introduced by Kodak in 1908, at first it found only a few special applications as an alternative to the hazardous nitrate film, which had the advantages of being considerably tougher, slightly more transparent, and cheaper. The changeover was not completed for X-ray films until 1933, and although safety film was always used for 16 mm and 8 mm home movies, nitrate film remained standard for theatrical 35 mm motion pictures until it was finally discontinued in 1951.

Films remained the dominant form of photography until the early 21st century when advances in digital photography drew consumers to digital formats. Although modern photography is dominated by digital users, film continues to be used by enthusiasts and professional photographers. The distinctive "look" of film based photographs compared to digital images is likely due to a combination of factors, including (1) differences in spectral and tonal sensitivity (S-shaped density-to-exposure (H&D curve) with film vs. linear response curve for digital CCD sensors), (2) resolution, and (3) continuity of tone.

=== Black-and-white ===
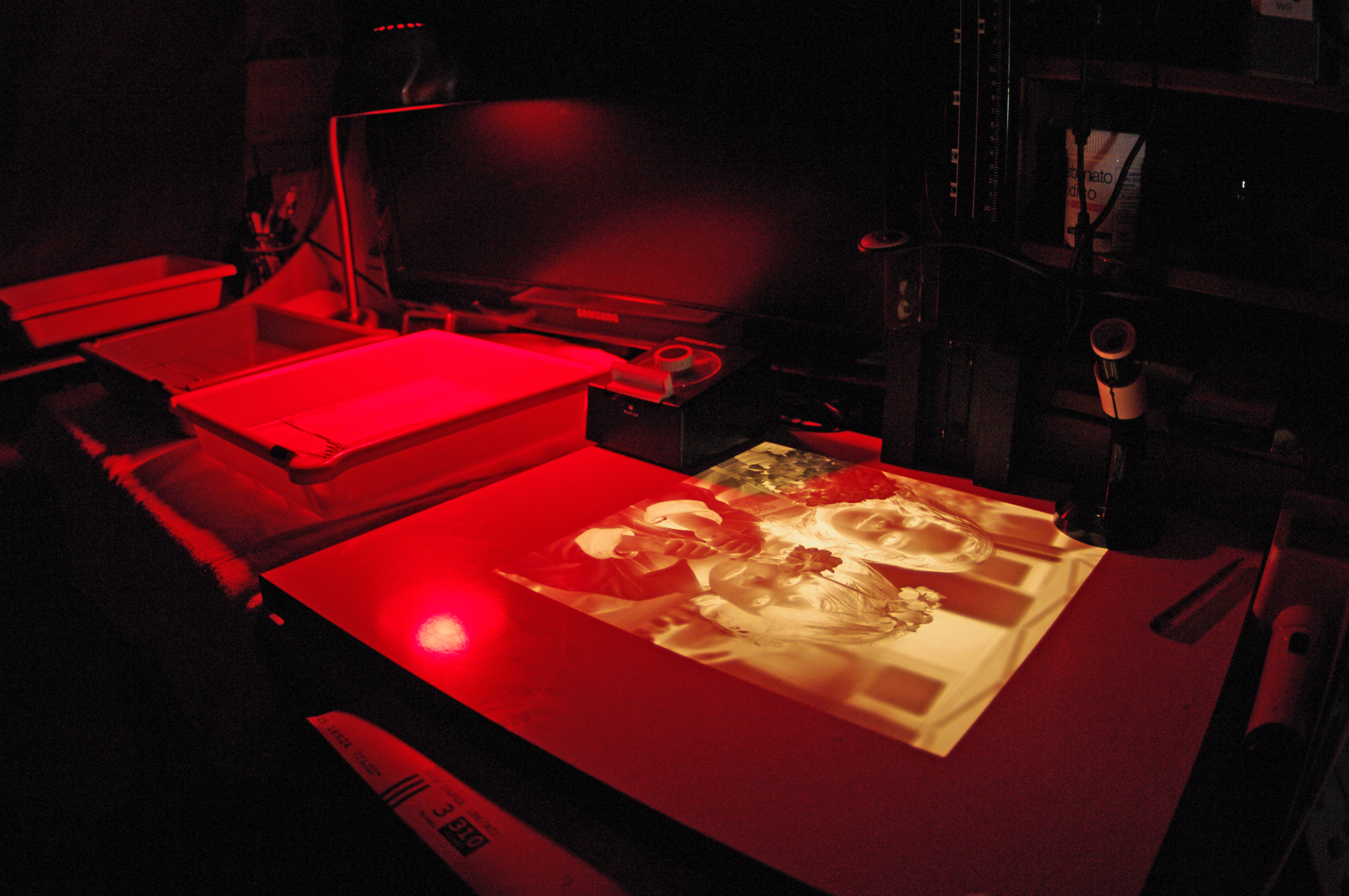
A photographic darkroom with safelight

Originally, all photography was monochrome, or black-and-white. Even after color film was readily available, black-and-white photography continued to dominate for decades, due to its lower cost, chemical stability, and its "classic" photographic look. The tones and contrast between light and dark areas define black-and-white photography. Monochromatic pictures are not necessarily composed of pure blacks, whites, and intermediate shades of gray but can involve shades of one particular hue depending on the process. The cyanotype process, for example, produces an image composed of blue tones. The albumen print process, publicly revealed in 1847, produces brownish tones.

Many photographers continue to produce some monochrome images, sometimes because of the established archival permanence of well-processed silver-halide-based materials. Some full-color digital images are processed using a variety of techniques to create black-and-white results, and some manufacturers produce digital cameras that exclusively shoot monochrome. Monochrome printing or electronic display can be used to salvage certain photographs taken in color which are unsatisfactory in their original form; sometimes when presented as black-and-white or single-color-toned images they are found to be more effective. Although color photography has long predominated, monochrome images are still produced, mostly for artistic reasons. Almost all digital cameras have an option to shoot in monochrome, and almost all image editing software can combine or selectively discard RGB color channels to produce a monochrome image from one shot in color.

=== Color ===
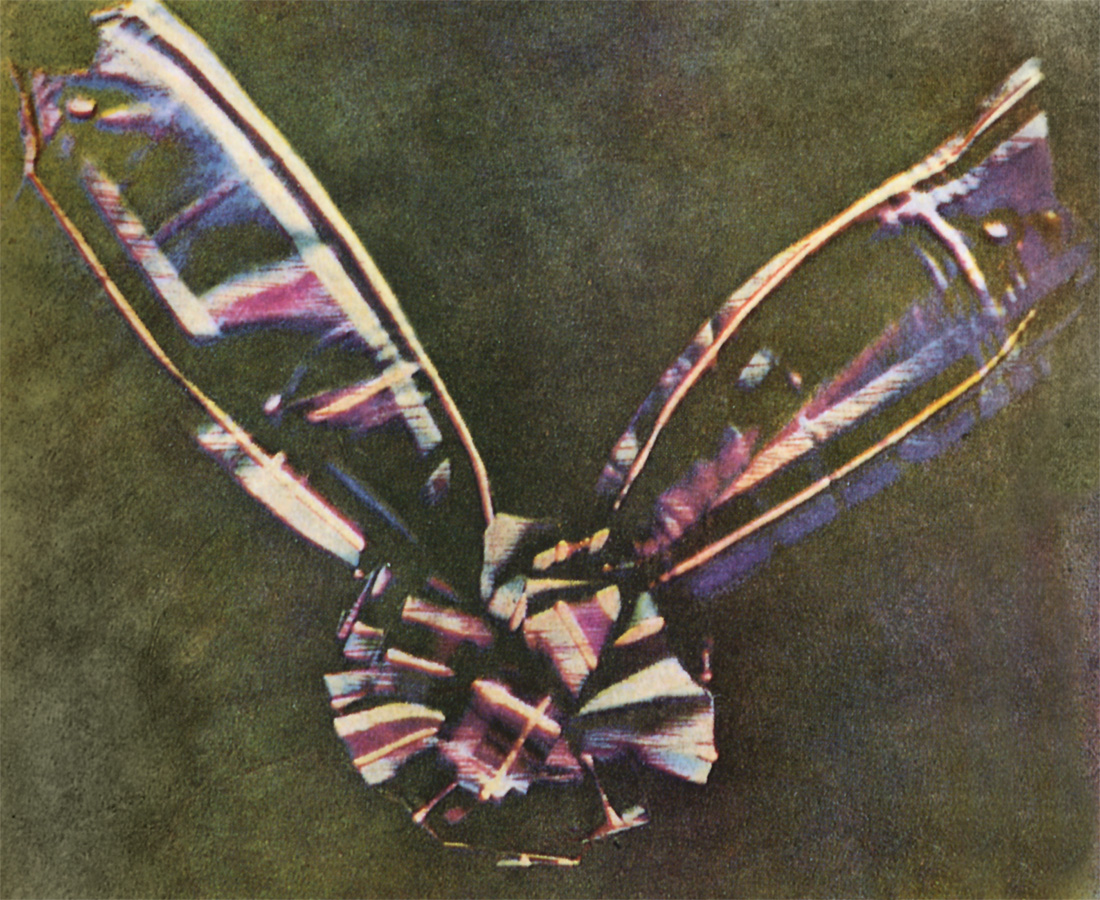
The first color photograph made by the three-color method suggested by James Clerk Maxwell in 1855, taken in 1861 by Thomas Sutton. The subject is a colored, tartan patterned ribbon.

Color photography was explored beginning in the 1840s. Early experiments in color required extremely long exposures (hours or days for camera images) and could not "fix" the photograph to prevent the color from quickly fading when exposed to white light.

The first permanent color photograph was taken in 1861 using the three-color-separation principle first published by Scottish physicist James Clerk Maxwell in 1855. The foundation of virtually all practical color processes, Maxwell's idea was to take three separate black-and-white photographs through red, green and blue filters. This provides the photographer with the three basic channels required to recreate a color image. Transparent prints of the images could be projected through similar color filters and superimposed on the projection screen, an additive method of color reproduction. A color print on paper could be produced by superimposing carbon prints of the three images made in their complementary colors, a subtractive method of color reproduction pioneered by Louis Ducos du Hauron in the late 1860s.

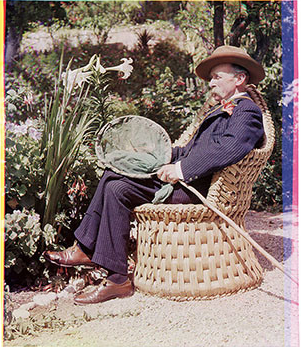
Color photography was possible long before Kodachrome, as this 1903 portrait by Sarah Angelina Acland demonstrates, but in its earliest years, the need for special equipment, long exposures, and complicated printing processes made it extremely rare.

Russian photographer Sergei Mikhailovich Prokudin-Gorskii made extensive use of this color separation technique, employing a special camera which successively exposed the three color-filtered images on different parts of an oblong plate. Because his exposures were not simultaneous, unsteady subjects exhibited color "fringes" or, if rapidly moving through the scene, appeared as brightly colored ghosts in the resulting projected or printed images.

Implementation of color photography was hindered by the limited sensitivity of early photographic materials, which were mostly sensitive to blue, only slightly sensitive to green, and virtually insensitive to red. The discovery of dye sensitization by photochemist Hermann Vogel in 1873 suddenly made it possible to add sensitivity to green, yellow and even red. Improved color sensitizers and ongoing improvements in the overall sensitivity of emulsions steadily reduced the once-prohibitive long exposure times required for color, bringing it ever closer to commercial viability.

Autochrome, the first commercially successful color process, was introduced by the Lumière brothers in 1907. Autochrome plates incorporated a mosaic color filter layer made of dyed grains of potato starch, which allowed the three color components to be recorded as adjacent microscopic image fragments. After an Autochrome plate was reversal processed to produce a positive transparency, the starch grains served to illuminate each fragment with the correct color and the tiny colored points blended together in the eye, synthesizing the color of the subject by the additive method. Autochrome plates were one of several varieties of additive color screen plates and films marketed between the 1890s and the 1950s.

Kodachrome, the first modern "integral tripack" (or "monopack") color film, was introduced by Kodak in 1935. It captured the three color components in a multi-layer emulsion. One layer was sensitized to record the red-dominated part of the spectrum, another layer recorded only the green part and a third recorded only the blue. Without special film processing, the result would simply be three superimposed black-and-white images, but complementary cyan, magenta, and yellow dye images were created in those layers by adding color couplers during a complex processing procedure.

Agfa's similarly structured Agfacolor Neu was introduced in 1936. Unlike Kodachrome, the color couplers in Agfacolor Neu were incorporated into the emulsion layers during manufacture, which greatly simplified the processing. Currently, available color films still employ a multi-layer emulsion and the same principles, most closely resembling Agfa's product.

Instant color film, used in a special camera which yielded a unique finished color print only a minute or two after the exposure, was introduced by Polaroid in 1963.

Color photography may form images as positive transparencies, which can be used in a slide projector, or as color negatives intended for use in creating positive color enlargements on specially coated paper. The latter is now the most common form of film (non-digital) color photography owing to the introduction of automated photo printing equipment. After a transition period centered around 1995–2005, color film was relegated to a niche market by inexpensive multi-megapixel digital cameras. Film continues to be the preference of some photographers because of its distinctive "look".

=== Digital ===
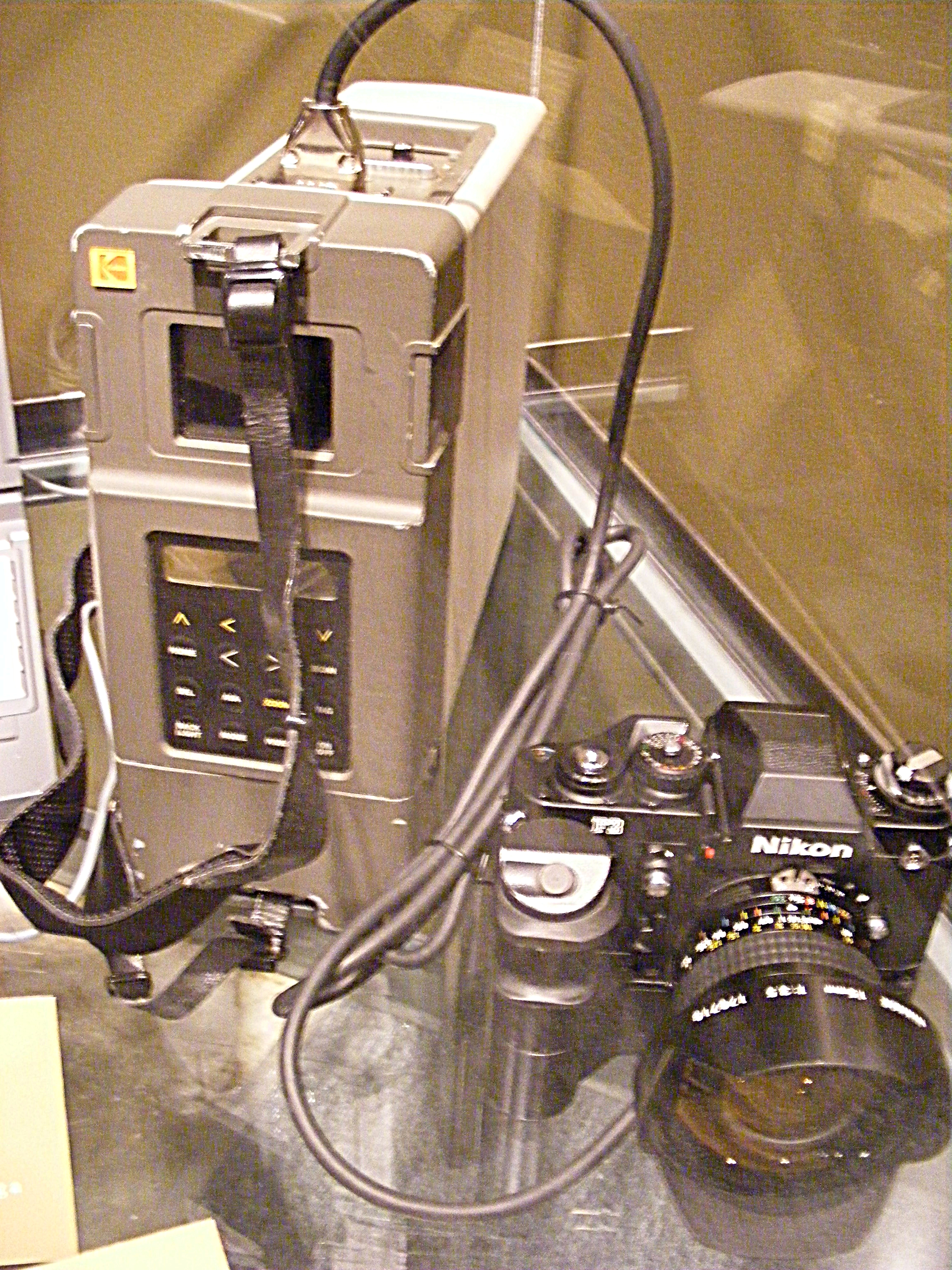
Kodak DCS 100, based on a Nikon F3 body with Digital Storage Unit

In 1981, Sony unveiled the first consumer camera to use a charge-coupled device for imaging, eliminating the need for film: the Sony Mavica. While the Mavica saved images to disk, the images were displayed on television, and the camera was not fully digital.

The first digital camera to both record and save images in a digital format was the Fujix DS-1P created by Fujifilm in 1988.

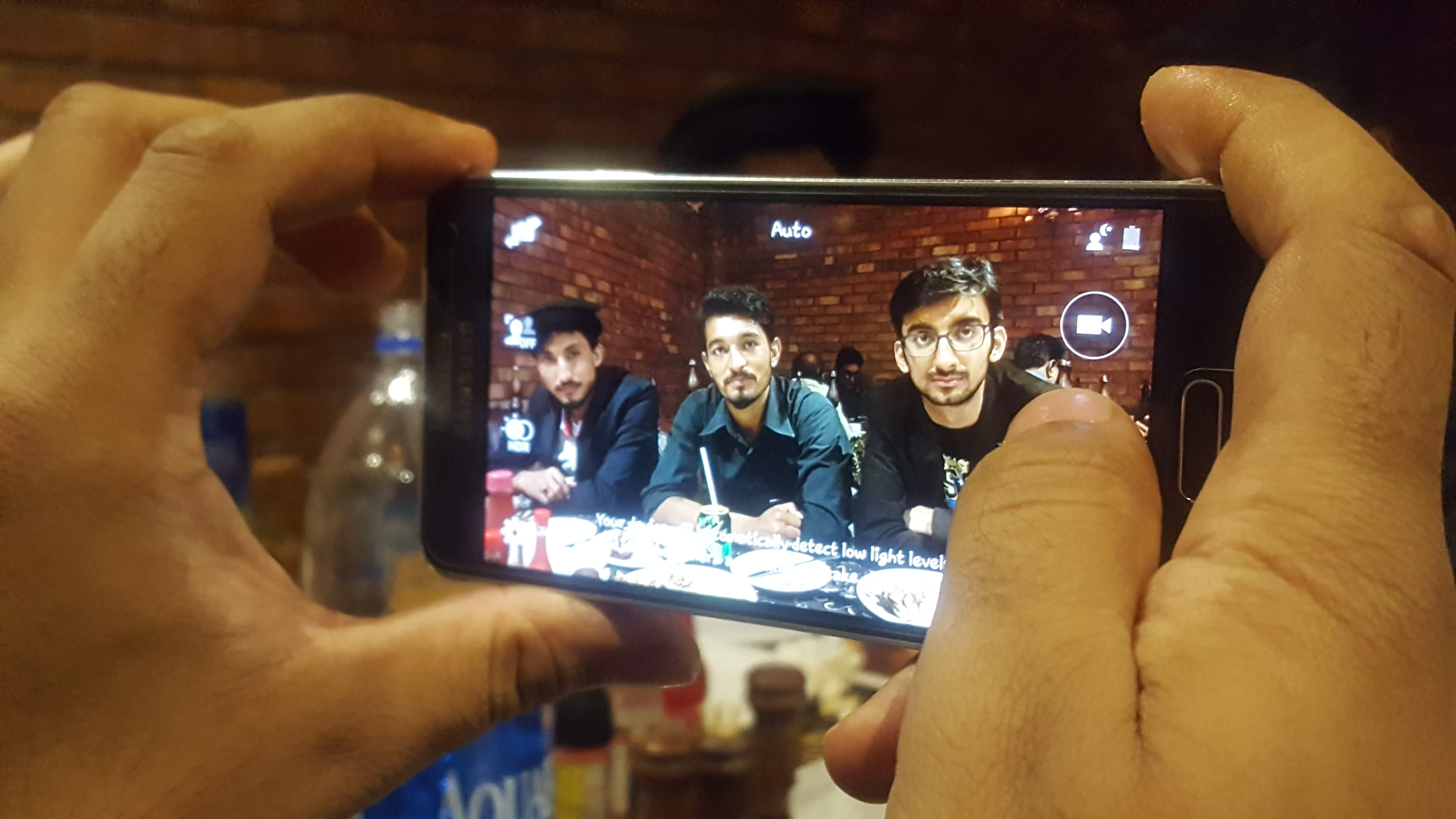
Photography on a smartphone

In 1991, Kodak unveiled the DCS 100, the first commercially available digital single-lens reflex camera. Although its high cost precluded uses other than photojournalism and professional photography, commercial digital photography was born.

Digital imaging uses an electronic image sensor to record the image as a set of electronic data rather than as chemical changes on film. An important difference between digital and chemical photography is that chemical photography resists photo manipulation because it involves film and photographic paper, while digital imaging is a highly manipulative medium. This difference allows for a degree of image post-processing that is comparatively difficult in film-based photography and permits different communicative potentials and applications.

Digital photography dominates the 21st century. More than 99% of photographs taken around the world are through digital cameras, increasingly through smartphones.

== Techniques ==
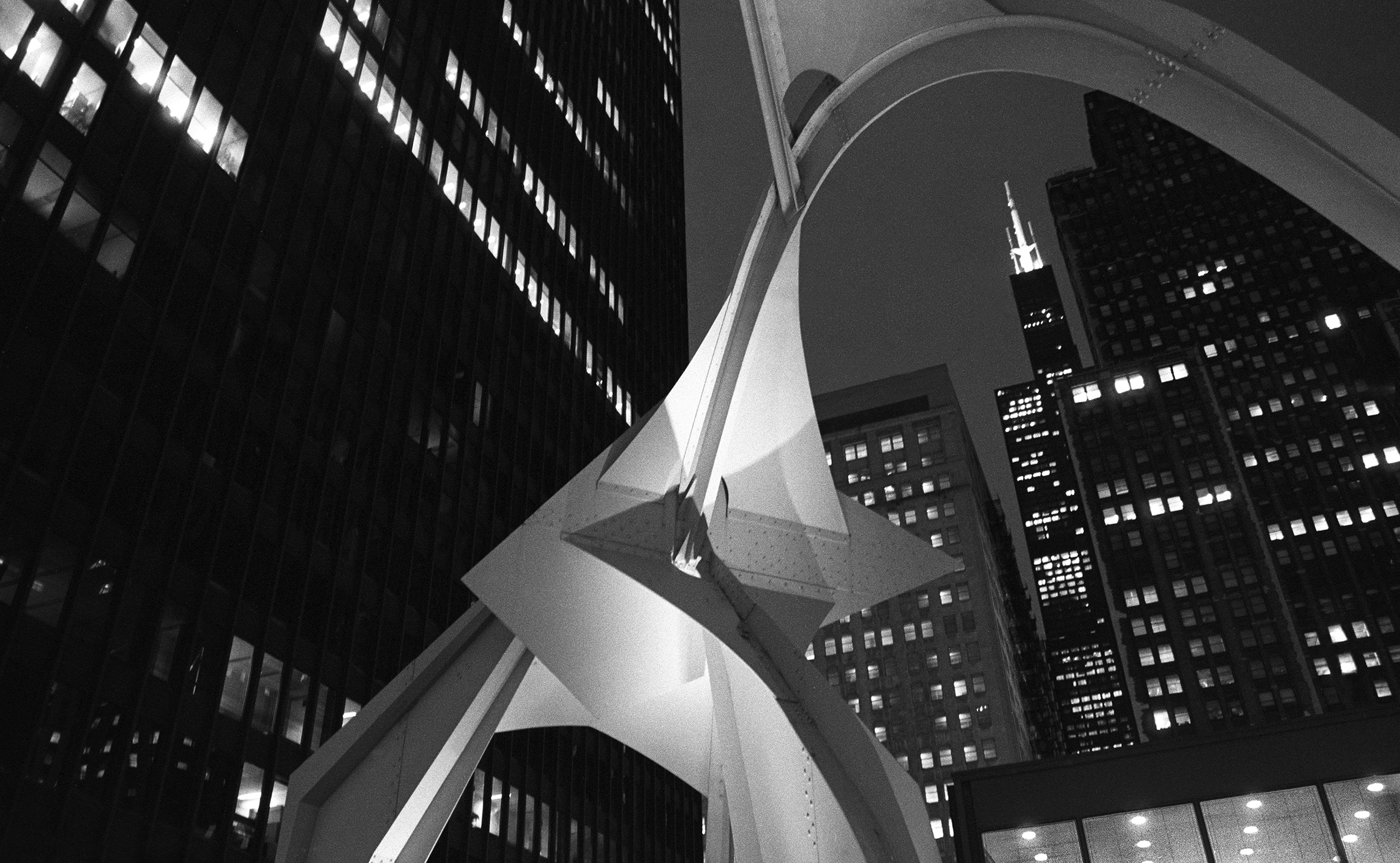
Angles such as vertical, horizontal, or as pictured here diagonal are considered important photographic techniques.

A large variety of photographic techniques and media are used in the process of capturing images for photography. These include the camera; dual photography; full-spectrum, ultraviolet and infrared media; light field photography; and other imaging techniques.

=== Cameras ===
The camera is the image-forming device, and a photographic plate, photographic film or a silicon electronic image sensor is the capture medium. The respective recording medium can be the plate or film itself, or a digital magnetic or electronic memory.

Photographers control the camera and lens to "expose" the light recording material to the required amount of light to form a "latent image" (on plate or film) or RAW file (in digital cameras) which, after appropriate processing, is converted to a usable image. Digital cameras use an electronic image sensor based on light-sensitive electronics such as charge-coupled device (CCD) or complementary metal–oxide–semiconductor (CMOS) technology. The resulting digital image is stored electronically, but can be reproduced on paper.

The camera (or 'camera obscura') is a dark room or chamber from which, as far as possible, all light is excluded except the light that forms the image. It was discovered and used in the 16th century by painters. The subject being photographed, however, must be illuminated. Cameras can range from small to very large, a whole room that is kept dark while the object to be photographed is in another room where it is properly illuminated. This was common for reproduction photography of flat copy when large film negatives were used (see Process camera).

As soon as photographic materials became "fast" (sensitive) enough for taking candid or surreptitious pictures, small "detective" cameras were made, some actually disguised as a book or handbag or pocket watch (the Ticka camera) or even worn hidden behind an Ascot necktie with a tie pin that was really the lens.

The movie camera is a type of photographic camera that takes a rapid sequence of photographs on recording medium. In contrast to a still camera, which captures a single snapshot at a time, the movie camera takes a series of images, each called a "frame". This is accomplished through an intermittent mechanism. The frames are later played back in a movie projector at a specific speed, called the "frame rate" (number of frames per second). While viewing, a person's eyes and brain merge the separate pictures to create the illusion of motion.

=== Stereoscopic ===
Photographs, both monochrome and color, can be captured and displayed through two side-by-side images that trigger components of human stereopsis. Stereoscopic photography was the first that captured figures in motion. Stereoscopic photography refers to taking two slightly different images to create a 3D effect. Such cameras have long been realized by using film and more recently in digital electronic methods (including cell phone cameras). The history of stereoscopic imaging as an artistic and cultural phenomenon was the subject of 3D: Double Vision (2018–2019) at the Los Angeles County Museum of Art, described as the first survey of stereoscopic and three-dimensional imaging in a North American art museum.

=== Dualphotography ===
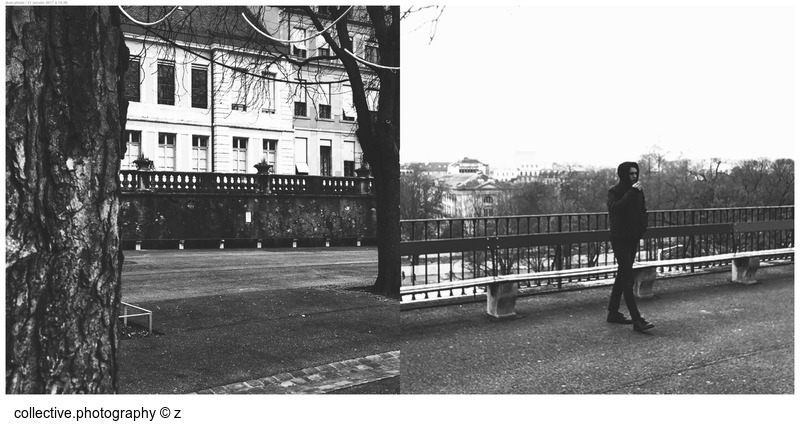
An example of a dualphoto using a smartphone based app

Dualphotography consists of photographing a scene from both sides of a photographic device at once (e.g. camera for back-to-back dualphotography, or two networked cameras for portal-plane dualphotography). The dualphoto apparatus can be used to simultaneously capture both the subject and the photographer, or both sides of a geographical place at once, thus adding a supplementary narrative layer to that of a single image.

=== Full-spectrum, ultraviolet and infrared ===
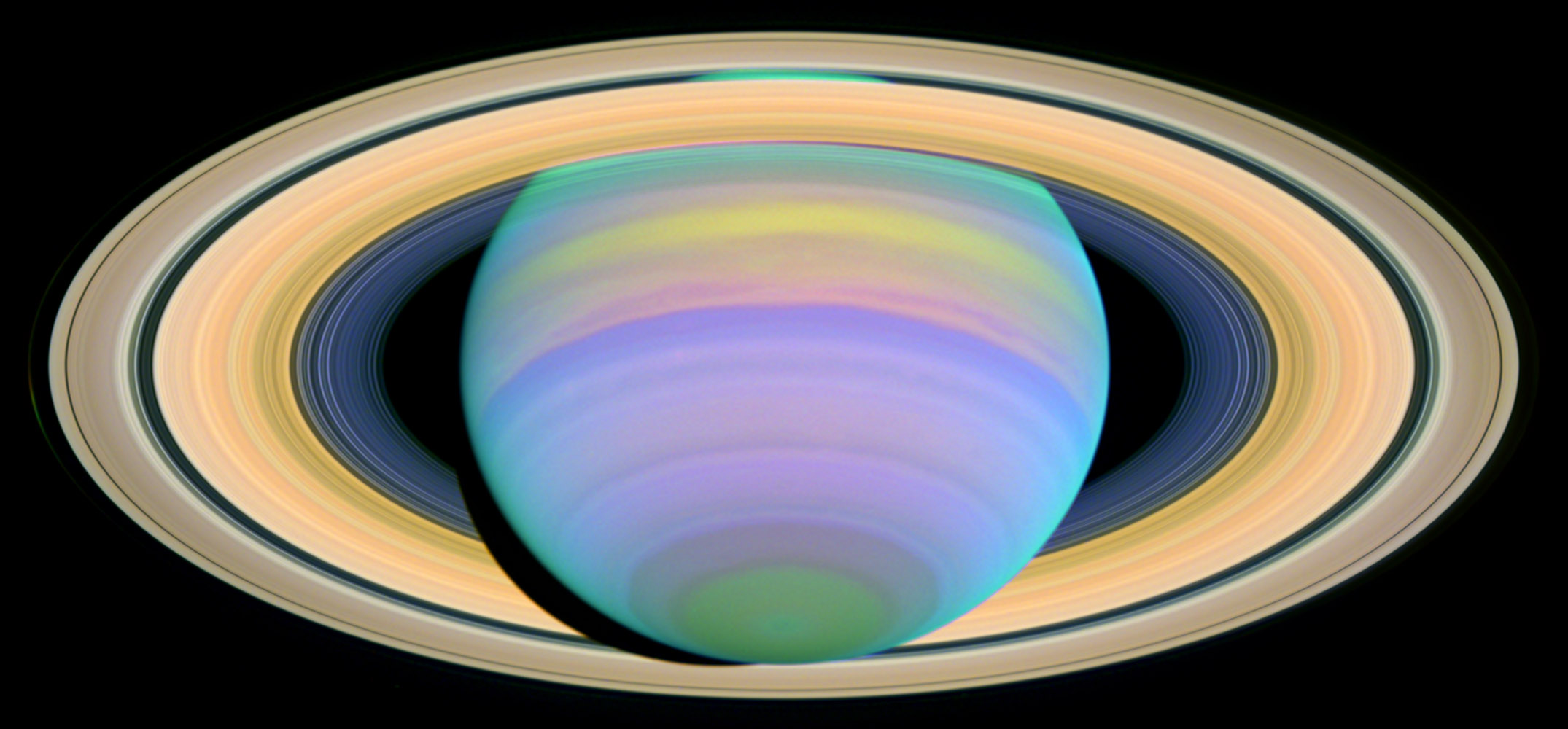
This image of the rings of Saturn is an example of the application of ultraviolet photography in astronomy.

Ultraviolet and infrared films have been available for many decades and employed in a variety of photographic avenues since the 1960s. New technological trends in digital photography have opened a new direction in full spectrum photography, where careful filtering choices across the ultraviolet, visible and infrared lead to new artistic visions.

Modified digital cameras can detect some ultraviolet, all of the visible and much of the near infrared spectrum, as most digital imaging sensors are sensitive from about 350 nm to 1000 nm. An off-the-shelf digital camera contains an infrared hot mirror filter that blocks most of the infrared and a bit of the ultraviolet that would otherwise be detected by the sensor, narrowing the accepted range from about 400 nm to 700 nm.

Replacing a hot mirror or infrared blocking filter with an infrared pass or a wide spectrally transmitting filter allows the camera to detect the wider spectrum light at greater sensitivity. Without the hot-mirror, the red, green and blue (or cyan, yellow and magenta) colored micro-filters placed over the sensor elements pass varying amounts of ultraviolet (blue window) and infrared (primarily red and somewhat lesser the green and blue micro-filters).

Uses of full spectrum photography are for fine art photography, geology, forensics and law enforcement.

=== Layering ===
Layering is a photographic composition technique that manipulates the foreground, subject or middle-ground, and background layers in a way that they all work together to tell a story through the image. Layers may be incorporated by altering the focal length, distorting the perspective by positioning the camera in a certain spot. People, movement, light and a variety of objects can be used in layering.

=== Light field ===
Digital methods of image capture and display processing have enabled the new technology of "light field photography" (also known as synthetic aperture photography). This process allows focusing at various depths of field to be selected after the photograph has been captured. As explained by Michael Faraday in 1846, the "light field" is understood as 5-dimensional, with each point in 3D space having attributes of two more angles that define the direction of each ray passing through that point.

These additional vector attributes can be captured optically through the use of microlenses at each pixel point within the 2-dimensional image sensor. Every pixel of the final image is actually a selection from each sub-array located under each microlens, as identified by a post-image capture focus algorithm.

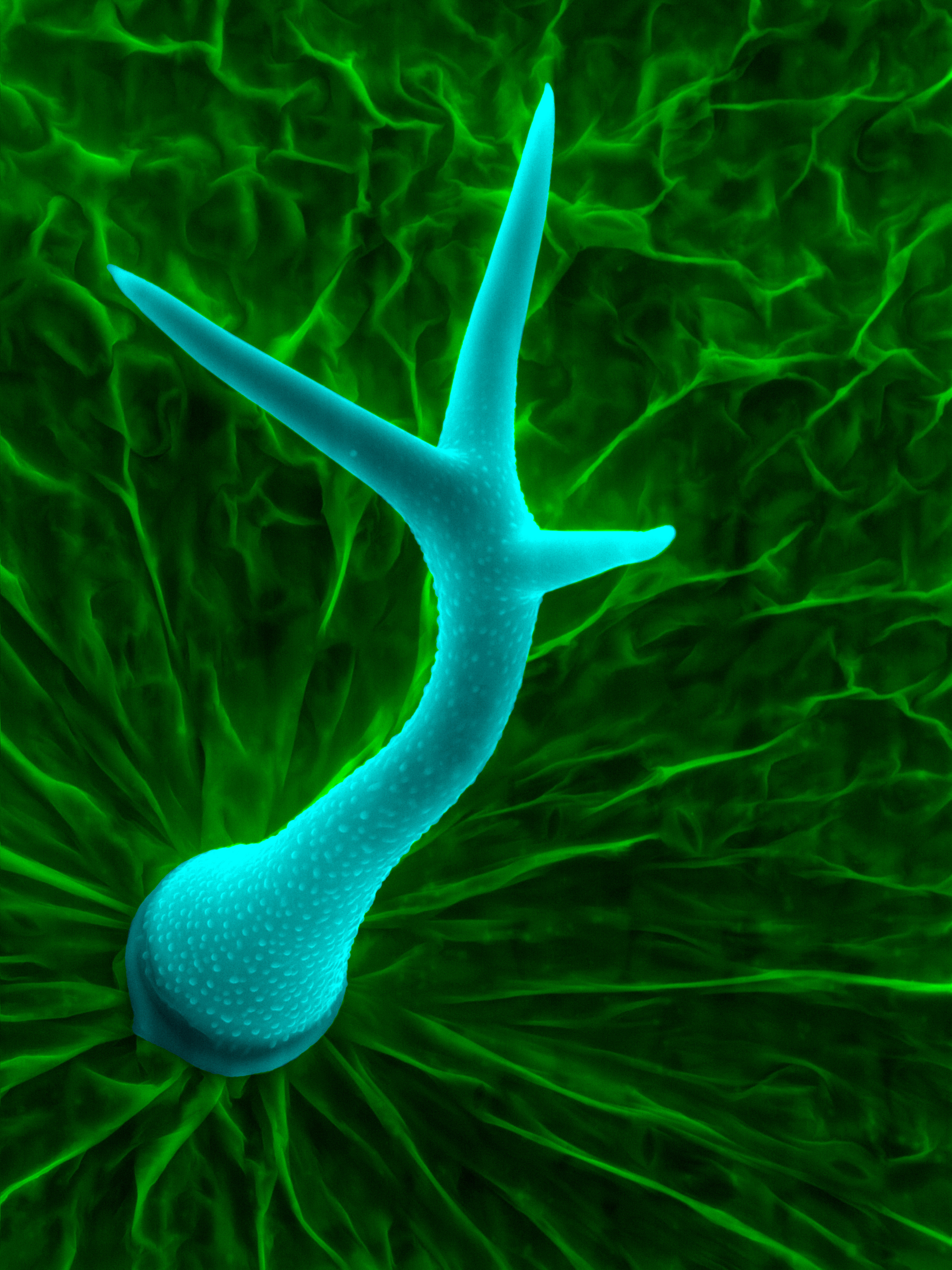
Devices other than cameras can be used to record images. Trichome of Arabidopsis thaliana seen via scanning electron microscope. Note that image has been edited by adding colors to clarify structure or to add an aesthetic effect. Heiti Paves from Tallinn University of Technology.

=== Other ===
Besides the camera, other methods of forming images with light are available. For instance, a photocopy or xerography machine forms permanent images but uses the transfer of static electrical charges rather than photographic medium, hence the term electrophotography. Photograms are images produced by the shadows of objects cast on the photographic paper, without the use of a camera. Objects can also be placed directly on the glass of an image scanner to produce digital pictures.

== Types ==
=== Amateur ===
Amateur photographers take photos for personal use, as a hobby or out of casual interest, rather than as a business or job. The quality of amateur work can be comparable to that of many professionals. Amateurs can fill a gap in subjects or topics that might not otherwise be photographed if they are not commercially useful or salable. Amateur photography grew during the late 19th century due to the popularization of the hand-held camera. Twenty-first century social media and near-ubiquitous camera phones have made photographic and video recording pervasive in everyday life. In the mid-2010s smartphone cameras added numerous automatic assistance features like color management, autofocus face detection and image stabilization that significantly decreased skill and effort needed to take high quality images.

=== Commercial ===
Commercial photography is probably best defined as any photography for which the photographer is paid for images rather than works of art. In this light, money could be paid for the subject of the photograph or the photograph itself. The commercial photographic world could include:

- Advertising photography: There are photographs made to illustrate and usually sell a service or product. These images, such as packshots, are generally done with an advertising agency, design firm or with an in-house corporate design team.
- Architectural photography focuses on capturing photographs of buildings and architectural structures that are aesthetically pleasing and accurate in terms of representations of their subjects.
- Event photography focuses on photographing guests and occurrences at mostly social events.
- Fashion and glamour photography usually incorporates models and is a form of advertising photography. Fashion photography, like the work featured in Harper's Bazaar, emphasizes clothes and other products; glamour emphasizes the model and body form while glamour photography is popular in advertising and men's magazines. Models in glamour photography sometimes work nude.
- 360 product photography displays a series of photos to give the impression of a rotating object. This technique is commonly used by ecommerce websites to help shoppers visualise products.
- Concert photography focuses on capturing candid images of both the artist or band as well as the atmosphere (including the crowd). Many of these photographers work freelance and are contracted through an artist or their management to cover a specific show. Concert photographs are often used to promote the artist or band in addition to the venue.
- Crime scene photography consists of photographing scenes of crime such as robberies and murders. A black and white camera or an infrared camera may be used to capture specific details.
- Still life photography usually depicts inanimate subject matter, typically commonplace objects which may be either natural or man-made. Still life is a broader category for food and some natural photography and can be used for advertising purposes.
- Real estate photography focuses on the production of photographs showcasing a property that is for sale, such photographs requires the use of wide-lens and extensive knowledge in high-dynamic-range imaging photography.

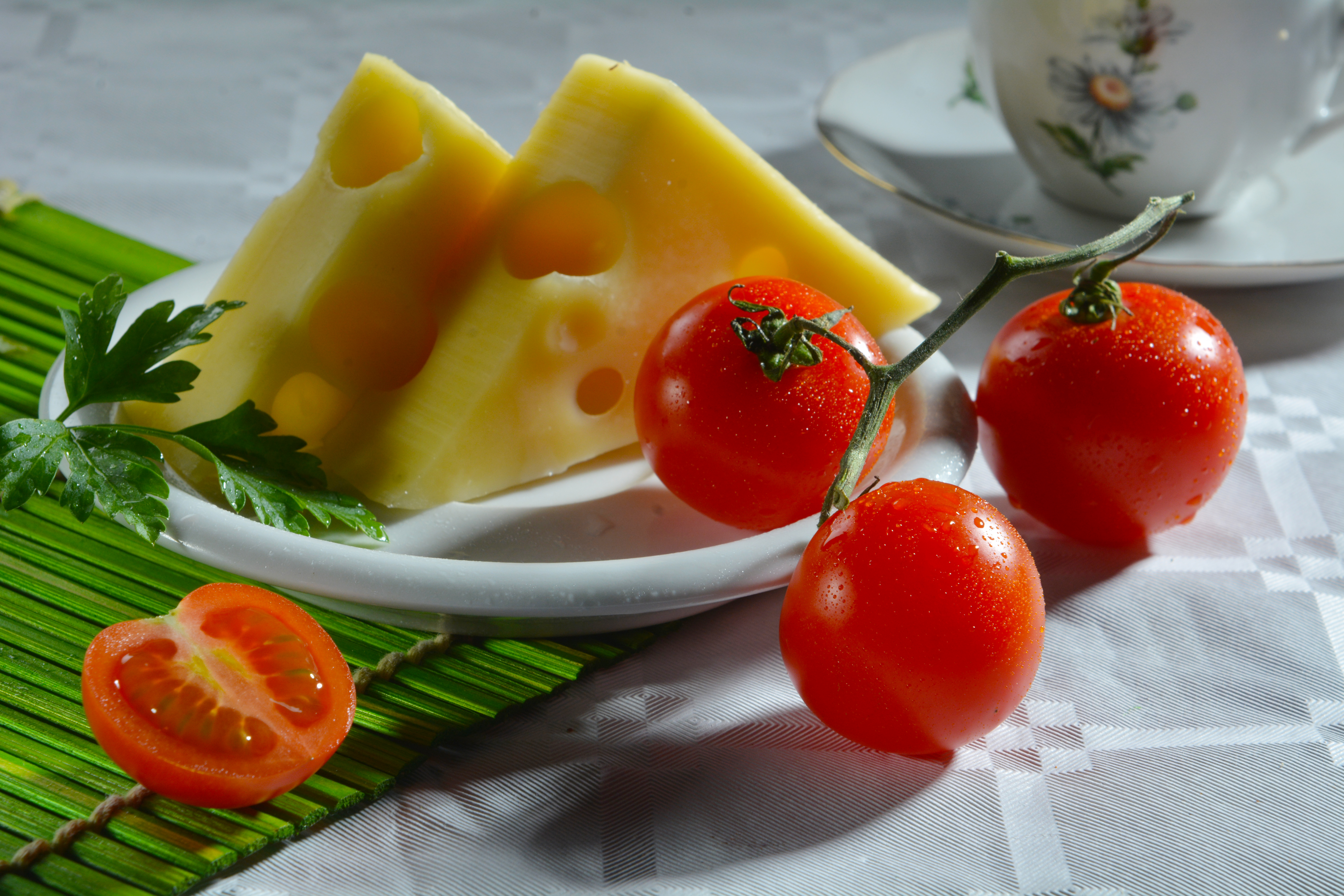
Example of a studio-made food photograph

- Food photography can be used for editorial, packaging or advertising use. Food photography is similar to still life photography but requires some special skills.
- Photojournalism can be considered a subset of editorial photography. Photographs made in this context are accepted as a documentation of a news story.
- Paparazzi is a form of photojournalism in which the photographer captures candid images of athletes, celebrities, politicians, and other prominent people.
- Portrait and wedding photography: Are photographs made and sold directly to the end user of the images.
- Landscape photography typically captures the presence of nature but can also focus on human-made features or disturbances of landscapes.
- Wildlife photography demonstrates the life of wild animals.

=== Art ===
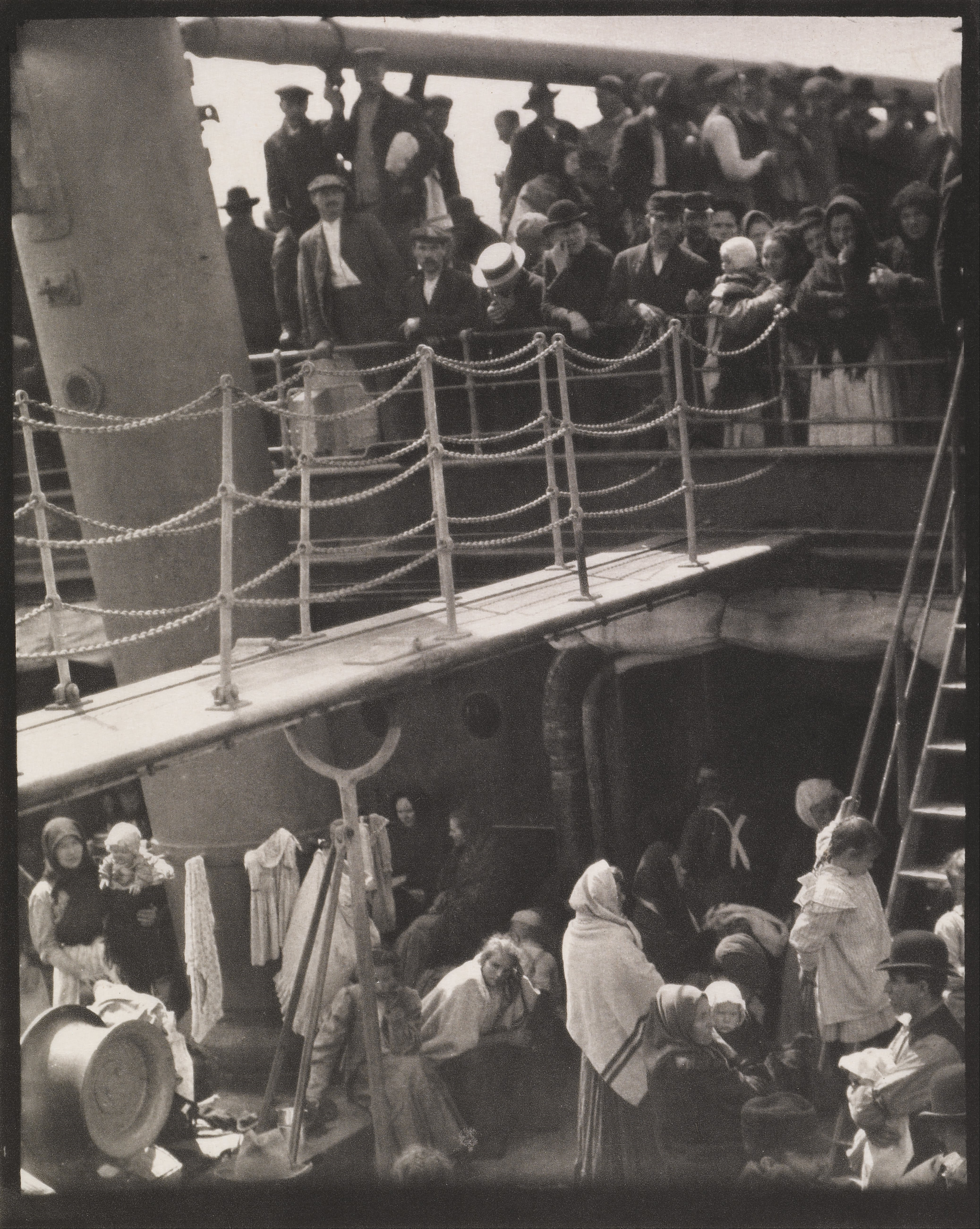
Classic Alfred Stieglitz photograph, The Steerage (1907) demonstrates the unique aesthetic of black-and-white photos.

During the 20th century, both fine art photography and documentary photography became accepted by the English-speaking art world and the gallery system. In the United States, a handful of photographers, including Alfred Stieglitz, Edward Steichen, John Szarkowski, F. Holland Day, and Edward Weston, spent their lives advocating for photography as a fine art. At first, fine art photographers tried to imitate painting styles. This movement is called Pictorialism, often using soft focus for a dreamy, 'romantic' look. In reaction to that, Weston, Ansel Adams, and others formed the Group f/64 to advocate 'straight photography', the photograph as a (sharply focused) thing in itself and not an imitation of something else.

The aesthetics of photography is a matter that continues to be discussed regularly, especially in artistic circles. Many artists argued that photography was the mechanical reproduction of an image. If photography is authentically art, then photography in the context of art would need redefinition, such as determining what component of a photograph makes it beautiful to the viewer. The controversy began with the earliest images "written with light"; Nicéphore Niépce, Louis Daguerre, and others among the very earliest photographers were met with acclaim, but some questioned if their work met the definitions and purposes of art.

Clive Bell in his classic essay Art states that only "significant form" can distinguish art from what is not art.

There must be some one quality without which a work of art cannot exist; possessing which, in the least degree, no work is altogether worthless. What is this quality? What quality is shared by all objects that provoke our aesthetic emotions? What quality is common to Sta. Sophia and the windows at Chartres, Mexican sculpture, a Persian bowl, Chinese carpets, Giotto's frescoes at Padua, and the masterpieces of Poussin, Piero della Francesca, and Cezanne? Only one answer seems possible – significant form. In each, lines and colors combined in a particular way, certain forms and relations of forms, stir our aesthetic emotions.

On 7 February 2007, Sotheby's London sold the 2001 photograph 99 Cent II Diptychon for an unprecedented $3,346,456 to an anonymous bidder, making it the most expensive at the time.

Conceptual photography turns a concept or idea into a photograph. Even though what is depicted in the photographs are real objects, the subject is strictly abstract.

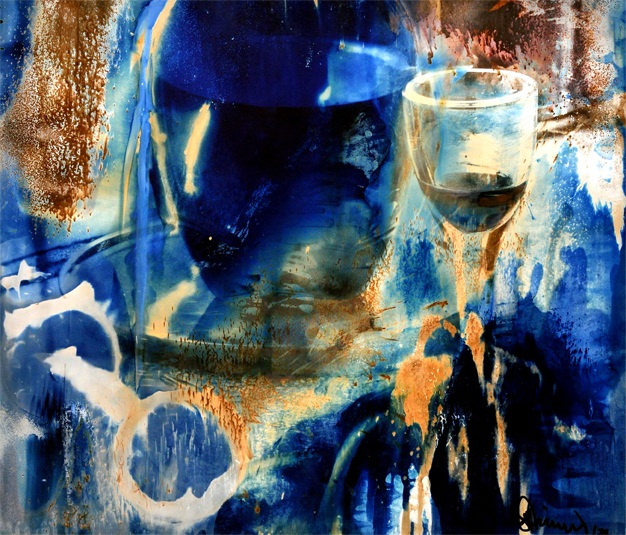
Josef H. Neumann: Gustav I (1976)

In parallel to this development, the then largely separate interface between painting and photography was closed in the second half of the 20th century with the chemigram of Pierre Cordier and the chemogram of Josef H. Neumann. In 1974 the chemograms by Josef H. Neumann concluded the separation of the painterly background and the photographic layer by showing the picture elements in a symbiosis that had never existed before, as an unmistakable unique specimen, in a simultaneous painterly and at the same time real photographic perspective, using lenses, within a photographic layer, united in colors and shapes. This Neumann chemogram from the 1970s thus differs from the beginning of the previously created cameraless chemigrams of a Pierre Cordier and the photogram Man Ray or László Moholy-Nagy of the previous decades. These works of art were almost simultaneous with the invention of photography by various important artists who characterized Hippolyte Bayard, Thomas Wedgwood, William Henry Fox Talbot in their early stages, and later Man Ray and László Moholy-Nagy in the twenties and by the painter in the thirties Edmund Kesting and Christian Schad by draping objects directly onto appropriately sensitized photo paper and using a light source without a camera.

=== Photojournalism ===
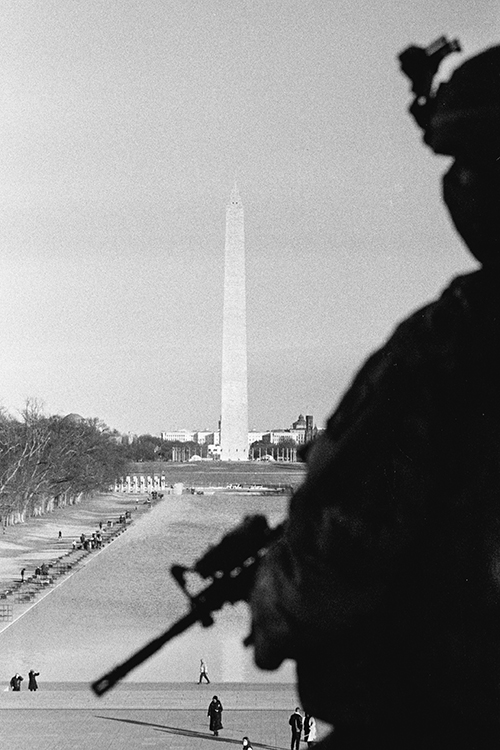
National Guardsman in Washington D.C. in 2021

Photojournalism is a particular form of photography (the collecting, editing, and presenting of news material for publication or broadcast) that employs images in order to tell a news story. It is now usually understood to refer only to still images, but in some cases the term also refers to video used in broadcast journalism. Photojournalism is distinguished from other close branches of photography (e.g., documentary photography, social documentary photography, street photography or celebrity photography) by complying with a rigid ethical framework which demands that the work be both honest and impartial whilst telling the story in strictly journalistic terms. Photojournalists create pictures that contribute to the news media, and help communities connect with one other. Photojournalists must be well informed and knowledgeable about events happening right outside their door. They deliver news in a creative format that is not only informative, but also entertaining, including sports photography.

=== Science and forensics ===
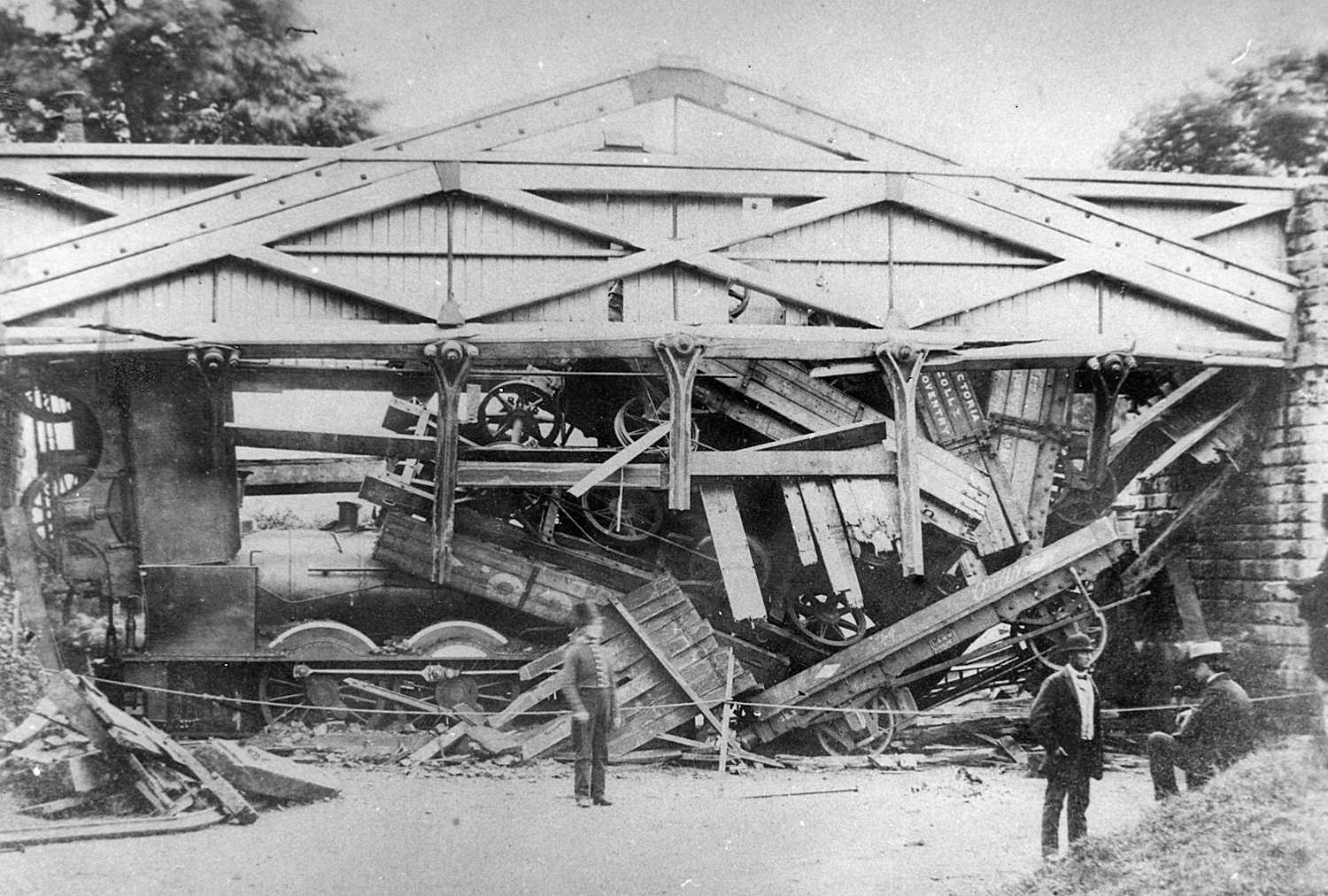
Wootton bridge collapse in 1861

The camera has a long and distinguished history as a means of recording scientific phenomena from the first use by Daguerre and Fox-Talbot, such as astronomical events (eclipses for example), small creatures and plants when the camera was attached to the eyepiece of microscopes (in photomicroscopy) and for macro photography of larger specimens. The camera also proved useful in recording crime scenes and the scenes of accidents, such as the Wootton bridge collapse in 1861. The methods used in analysing photographs for use in legal cases are collectively known as forensic photography. Crime scene photos are usually taken from three vantage points: overview, mid-range, and close-up.

In 1845 Francis Ronalds, the Honorary Director of the Kew Observatory, invented the first successful camera to make continuous recordings of meteorological and geomagnetic parameters. Different machines produced 12- or 24-hour photographic traces of the minute-by-minute variations of atmospheric pressure, temperature, humidity, atmospheric electricity, and the three components of geomagnetic forces. The cameras were supplied to numerous observatories around the world and some remained in use until well into the 20th century. Charles Brooke a little later developed similar instruments for the Greenwich Observatory.

Science regularly uses image technology that has derived from the design of the pinhole camera to avoid distortions that can be caused by lenses. X-ray machines are similar in design to pinhole cameras, with high-grade filters and laser radiation. Photography has become universal in recording events and data in science and engineering, and at crime scenes or accident scenes. The method has been much extended by using other wavelengths, such as infrared photography and ultraviolet photography, as well as spectroscopy. Those methods were first used in the Victorian era and improved much further since that time.

The first photographed atom was discovered in 2012 by physicists at Griffith University, Australia. They used an electric field to trap an "Ion" of the element, Ytterbium. The image was recorded on a CCD, an electronic photographic film.

=== Wildlife photography ===
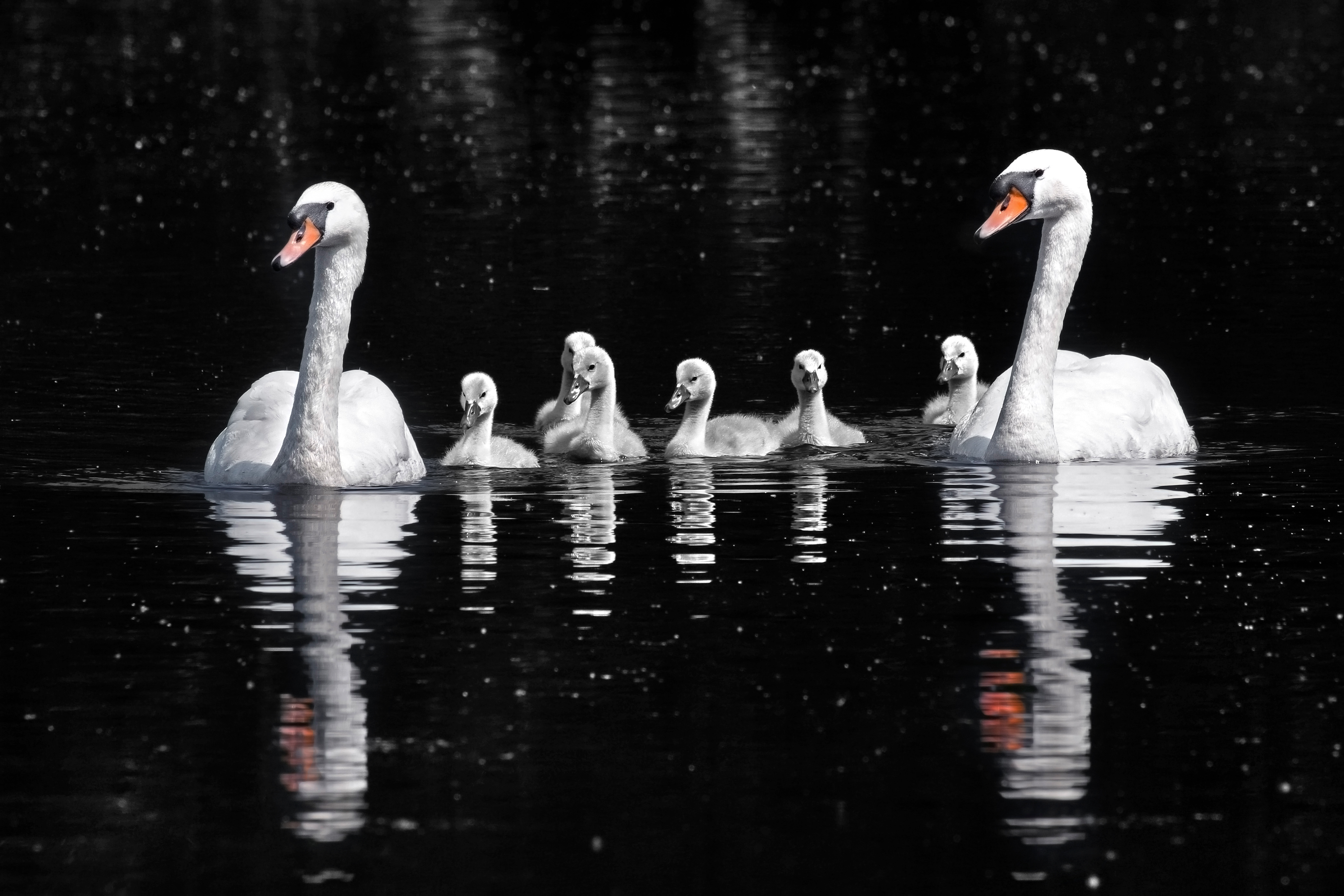
Mute swans and their cygnets photographed on Wolvercote lakes

Wildlife photography involves capturing images of various forms of wildlife. Unlike other forms of photography such as product or food photography, successful wildlife photography requires a photographer to choose the right place and right time when specific wildlife are present and active. It often requires great patience and considerable skill and command of the right photographic equipment.

== Social and cultural implications ==
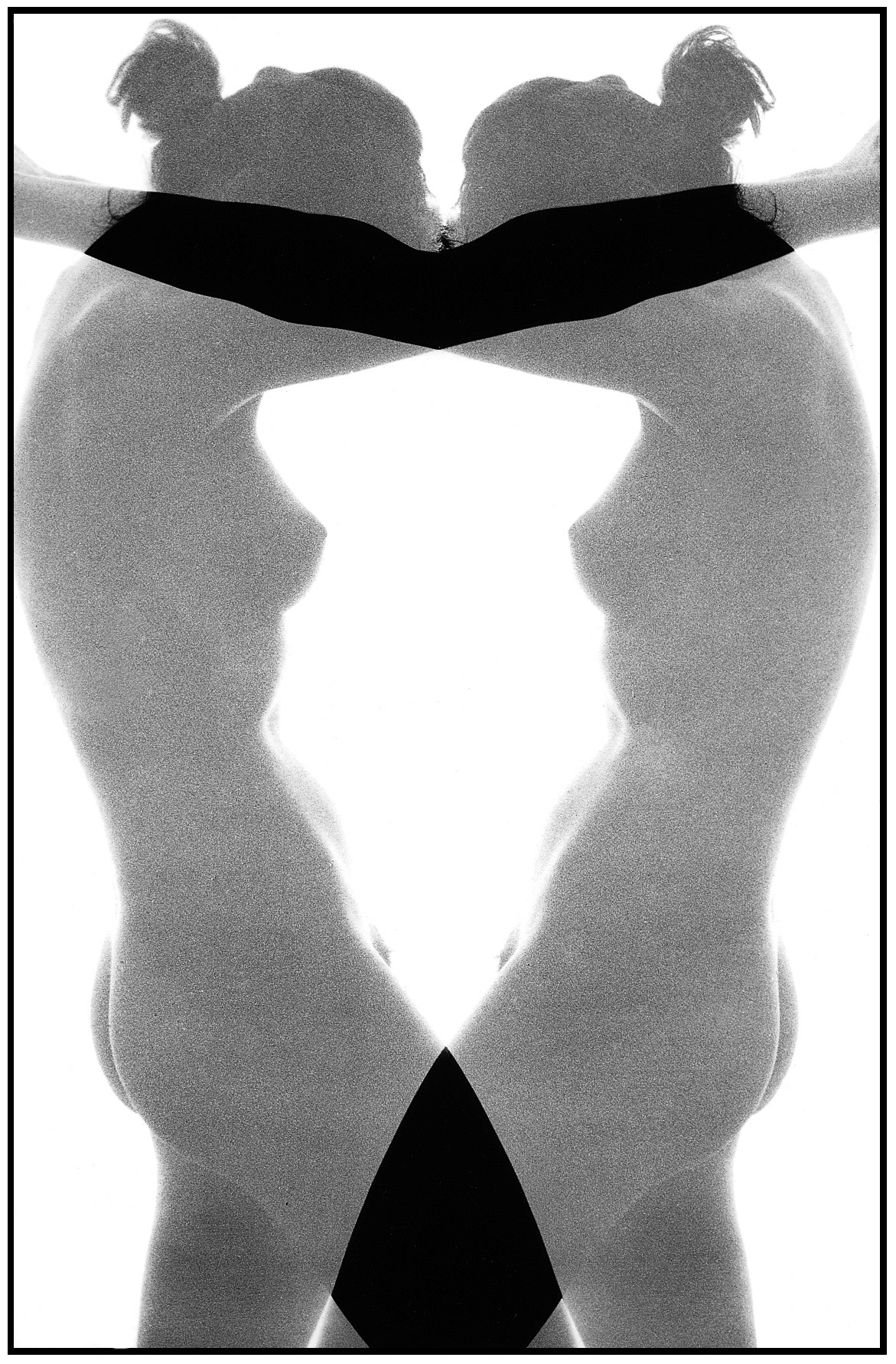
Photography may be used both to capture reality and to produce a work of art. While photo manipulation was often frowned upon at first, it was eventually used to great extent to produce artistic effects. Nude composition 19 from 1988 by Jaan Künnap.

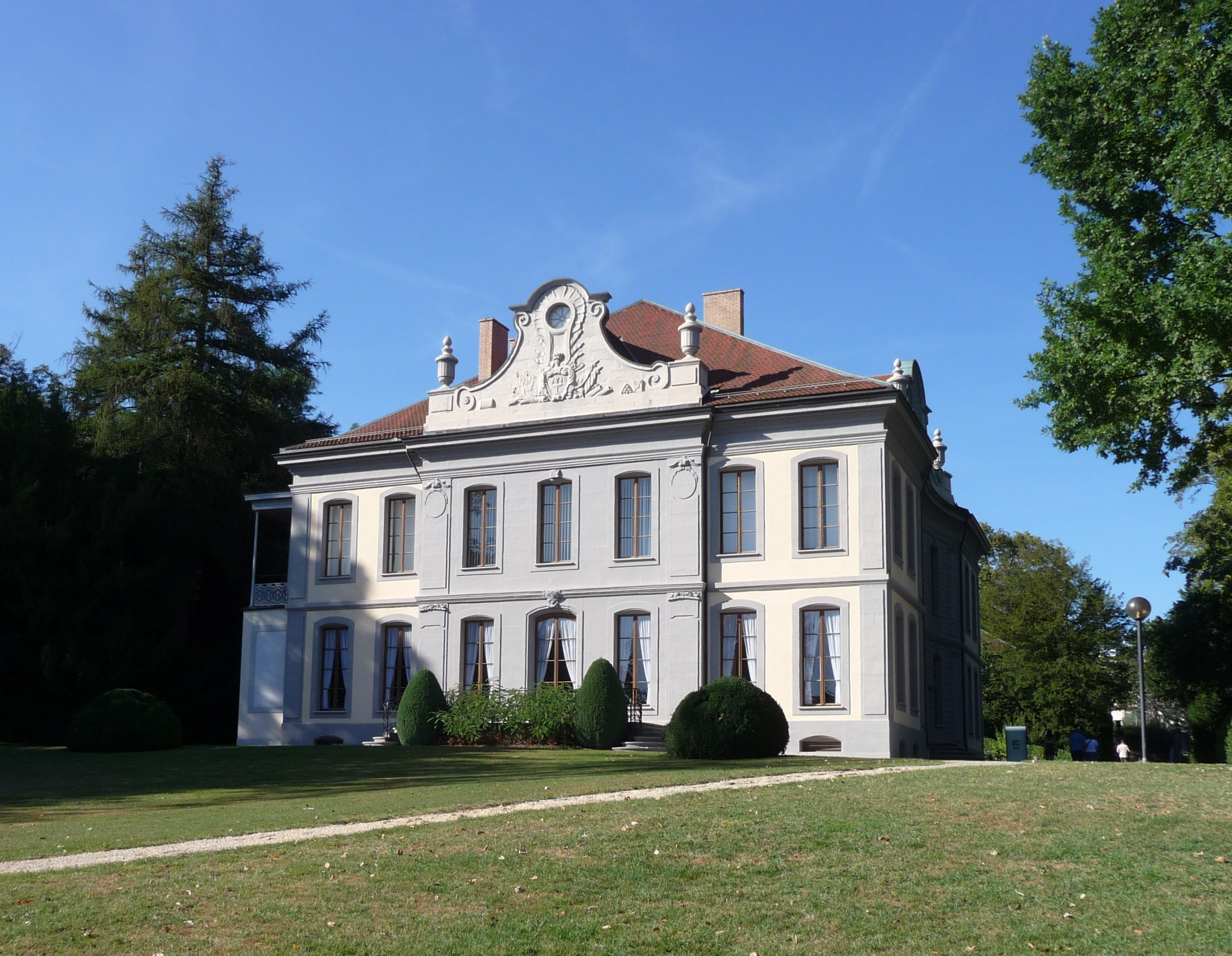
The Musée de l'Élysée, founded in 1985 in Lausanne, was the first photography museum in Europe.

There are many ongoing questions about different aspects of photography. In her On Photography (1977), Susan Sontag dismisses the objectivity of photography. This is a highly debated subject within the photographic community. Sontag argues, "To photograph is to appropriate the thing photographed. It means putting one's self into a certain relation to the world that feels like knowledge, and therefore like power." Photographers decide what to take a photo of, what elements to exclude and what angle to frame the photo, and these factors may reflect a particular socio-historical context. Along these lines, it can be argued that photography is a subjective form of representation.

Modern photography has raised a number of concerns on its effect on society. In Alfred Hitchcock's Rear Window (1954), the camera is presented as promoting voyeurism. 'Although the camera is an observation station, the act of photographing is more than passive observing'.

The camera doesn't rape or even possess, though it may presume, intrude, trespass, distort, exploit, and, at the farthest reach of metaphor, assassinate – all activities that, unlike the sexual push and shove, can be conducted from a distance, and with some detachment.

Digital imaging has raised ethical concerns because of the ease of manipulating digital photographs in post-processing. Many photojournalists have declared they will not crop their pictures or are forbidden from combining elements of multiple photos to make "photomontages", passing them as "real" photographs. Today's technology has made image editing relatively simple for even the novice photographer. However, recent changes of in-camera processing allow digital fingerprinting of photos to detect tampering for purposes of forensic photography.

Photography is one of the new media forms that changes perception and changes the structure of society. Further unease has been caused around cameras in regards to desensitization. Fears that disturbing or explicit images are widely accessible to children and society at large have been raised. Particularly, photos of war and pornography are causing a stir. Sontag is concerned that "to photograph is to turn people into objects that can be symbolically possessed". Desensitization discussion goes hand in hand with debates about censored images. Sontag writes of her concern that the ability to censor pictures means the photographer has the ability to construct reality.

One of the practices through which photography constitutes society is tourism. Tourism and photography combine to create a "tourist gaze" in which local inhabitants are positioned and defined by the camera lens. However, it has also been argued that there exists a "reverse gaze" through which indigenous photographees can position the tourist photographer as a shallow consumer of images.

== Law ==
Photography is both restricted and protected by the law in many jurisdictions. Protection of photographs is typically achieved by granting copyright or moral rights to the photographer. In the United States, photography is protected as a First Amendment right, and anyone is free to photograph anything seen in public spaces as long as it is in plain view. In the UK, the Counter-Terrorism Act (2008) has increased the power of the police to prevent people, even press photographers, from taking pictures in public places.

== See also ==
- Outline of photography
- Science of photography
- List of photographers
- List of photography awards
- List of most expensive photographs
- List of photographs considered the most important
- Astrophotography
- Image editing
- Imaging
- Photolab and minilab
- Visual arts
- Large format
- Medium format
- Microform
- Animation
