= Full-spectrum photography =

Photography capturing visible and near-infrared light

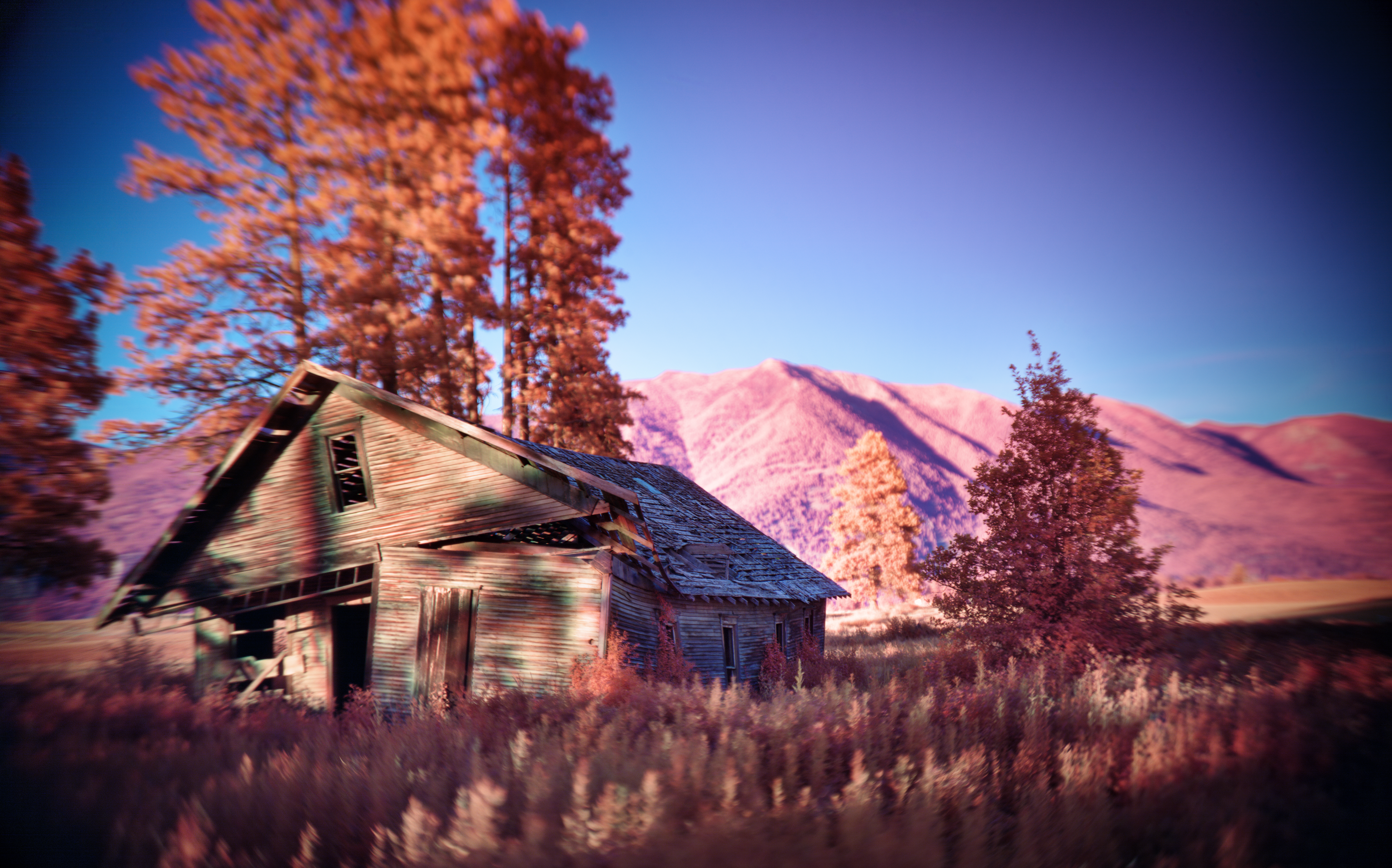
A full spectrum photograph of an old homestead in Montana

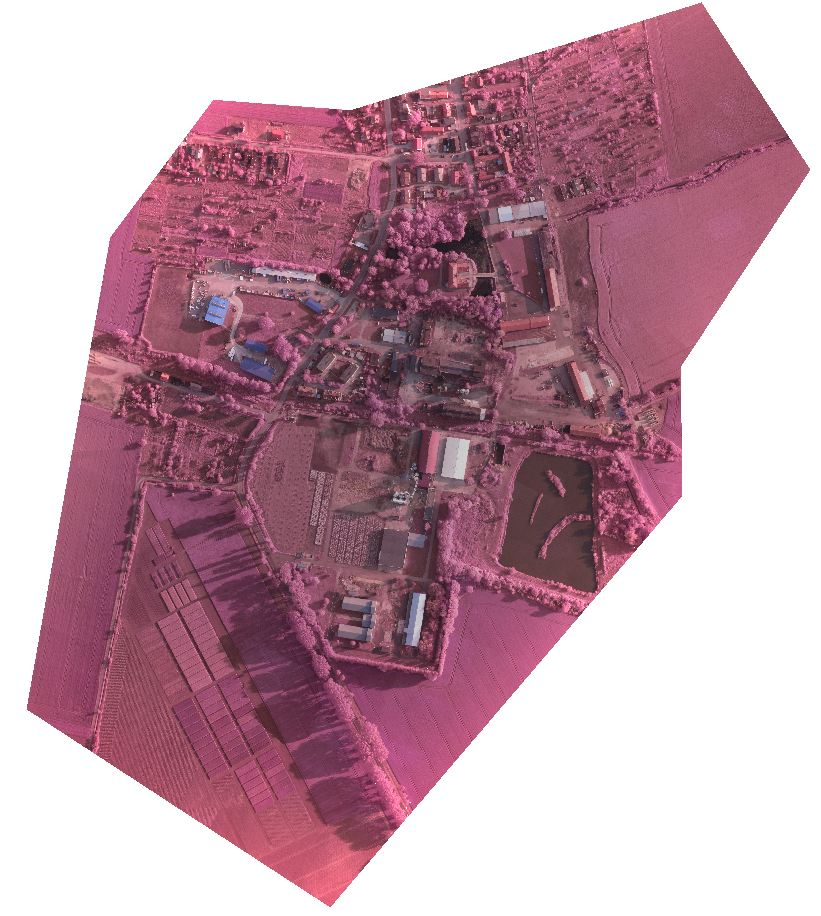
Full Spectrum Geo-Referenced Orthomosaic (RGB+NIR) obtained with an UAV

Full-spectrum photography is a subset of multispectral imaging, defined among photography enthusiasts as imaging with consumer cameras the full, broad spectrum of a film or camera sensor bandwidth. In practice, specialized broadband/full-spectrum film captures visible and near infrared light, commonly referred to as the "VNIR".

Modified digital cameras can detect some ultraviolet, all of the visible and much of the near infrared spectrum, as most digital imaging sensors are sensitive from about 350 nm to 1000 nm. An off-the-shelf digital camera contains an infrared hot mirror filter that blocks most of the infrared and a bit of the ultraviolet that would otherwise be detected by the sensor, narrowing the accepted range from about 400 nm to 700 nm. Replacing a hot mirror or infrared blocking filter with an infrared pass or a wide spectrally transmitting filter allows the camera to detect the wider spectrum light at greater sensitivity. Without the hot-mirror, the red, green and blue (or cyan, yellow and magenta) elements of the color filter array placed over the sensor elements pass varying amounts of ultraviolet and infrared which may be recorded in any of the red, green or blue channels depending on the particular sensor in use and on the dyes used in the Bayer filter. A converted full-spectrum camera can be used for ultraviolet photography or infrared photography with the appropriate filters.

Uses of full-spectrum photography include fine art photography, geology, forensics & law enforcement, and even some claimed use in ghost hunting.

== History ==
Full-spectrum photography has its roots in spectral imaging, both multispectral and hyperspectral imaging, which began as early as the late 1950s and early 1960s as means for geological and military remote sensing. Wideband panchromatic film has been available in various forms since the 1920s, when some UV and IR sensitivity remained in commercially available emulsions. The earliest color films sometimes included wider band color than recent commercial photographic emulsions, and can be recognized by the more reddish and or limited color tones of early color prints (not to be confused with print fading).

In the late 1990s enthusiastic photographers began shooting infrared with digital cameras, necessitating either long exposures or the removal of the internal hot mirror. Most replaced the hot mirror with an infrared pass filter of the same optical thickness (to retain focus) and pass only infrared light to achieve results seen with infrared B&W film. Around 2000, electro-optical engineer David Twede, already engaged in VNIR and infrared spectral remote sensing, ventured into Full-spectrum photography art, using a modified digital camera to explore broader spectral imaging and developing an artistic style using it. Around 2003, forensics photographers using engineered cameras for specific purposes began modifying off-the-shelf digital cameras to acquire less expensive tools. Full-spectrum photography is used by enthusiasts of ghost hunting, though no claims of actually photographing psychic phenomenon with Full-spectrum or infrared photography have been substantiated.

Today, there are a few places that will modify digital cameras to pass broad, full-spectrum light for full spectral imaging. A few DSLR cameras such as the Fujifilm FinePix IS Pro are purpose-designed for full spectrum use and respond from approximately 1000 nm (IR) to 380 nm (UV).

== Basics ==
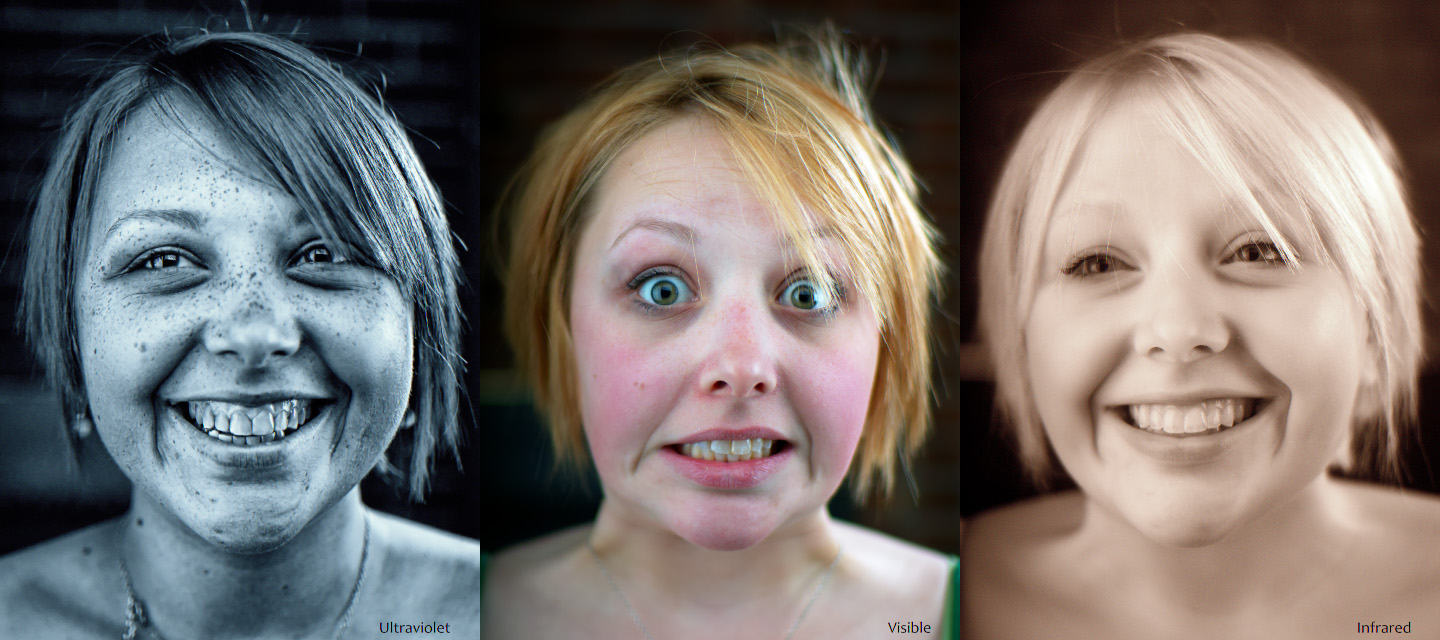
Comparison of images taken with different spectral responses.

Digital sensors and photographic films can be made to record non-visible ultraviolet (UV) and infrared (IR) radiation. In each case, they generally require special equipment: converted digital cameras, specific filters, highly transmitting lenses, etc. For example, most photographic lenses are made of glass and will filter out most ultraviolet light. Instead, expensive lenses made of quartz must be used. Infrared films may be shot in standard cameras using an infrared pass filter, although focus must compensate for the infrared focal point.

A converted digital camera usually requires that the infrared hot mirror be removed and replaced by a wideband, spectrally flat glass of the same optical path length. Typical glass types used include Schott WG-280 and BK-7, which transmit as much as 90% from around 300 nm to past 1000 nm. Removing the hot mirror is tedious and may require special tools and clean rooms.

Once the camera is sensitive to the full-spectrum, external filters can be used to selectively filter portions of the UV, visible and infrared to achieve various effects. For example, a standard red #25a can be used to include red light and infrared light together, yielding particularly strong two-toned color images of a reddish nature except where the infrared is high and shows as cyan. Another example, using UV/IR filters such as the 18A or U-330 yield a two or three toned image in which blues and yellows dominate. Less common filters have been claimed to give a variety of color effects ranging from diverse pastel foliage and deep blue skies to surrealistic effects of the sky and ground, though digital image processing is likely required to achieve the full effects. One issue with full-spectrum photography in either film or digital photography is the chromatic aberration produced by the wideband information. That is, different spectra, including the ultraviolet and infrared, will focus at different focal points, yielding blurry images and color edge effects, depending on the focal length used. There are specialized lenses such as the Nikon 105mm f4.5 UV-Nikkor which are designed to eliminate this chromatic aberration.

While the converted camera sensor is capable of recording in both the ultraviolet and infrared region, when mixed light hits the sensor it will be the longer infrared waves that will predominate in the recording. Little or no shortwave ultraviolet light may be recorded unless selective filtering is applied to cut some or all of the infrared light. The longwave infrared light may also wash out a considerable amount of the visible light in the blue and green areas in a full spectrum photograph. Similarly if infrared light is entirely blocked, the visible light can overwhelm the recording of the ultraviolet light. So there is no truly full-spectrum photograph that can be made.

Full-spectrum photography achieves various effects and surrealistic colors from the interaction of reflectivity (UV, visible, IR) of nature and man made materials and the specific spectral transmission of the red, green and blue filters on the camera. The addition of external filters will reduce and emphasize different interactions, yielding different effects.

== Applications ==
=== Art ===
Full-spectrum photography is being used for art photography and can yield colors similar to visible color film, but with a brightness and tonality of infrared photographs. Most full-spectrum art is of landscapes. A movement is also building for artistic human photography with full-spectrum photography, that captures a real person interacting with a surreal landscape. Full-spectrum photography art is displayed at galleries in Colorado and Florida.

=== Science hobbyists ===
Hyperspectral and most multispectral cameras are expensive and difficult to operate, requiring a computer acquisition and laborious post-processing. Modified digital cameras with the proper filtering avail some limited spectral sensing for geology/mineralogy, agriculture and oceanographic purposes. Most consumer cameras retain the red, green and blue micro-filters, thus limiting their usefulness in scientific imaging.

=== Forensics ===
Forensics imaging often uses Full-spectrum cameras to emphasize non-visible materials which have more diverse reflectivities in the ultraviolet and infrared. Applications include non-visible inks (uv & ir), disturbed soil (uv & ir), gunshot residue (ir), body fluids (uv), fibers, etc. Analogous to forensics, Full-spectrum cameras are being explored to enhance photographic recordings of archeological findings.

== See also ==
- Infrared photography
- Ultraviolet photography
- Hyperspectral imaging
- Multispectral imaging
- Full-spectrum light
- History of forensic photography
- Fujifilm FinePix IS Pro full spectrum camera
