= Positive (photography) =

Positive has multiple meanings in the world of photography. The two main definitions of positive photography include positive space and positive film.

== Positive space ==
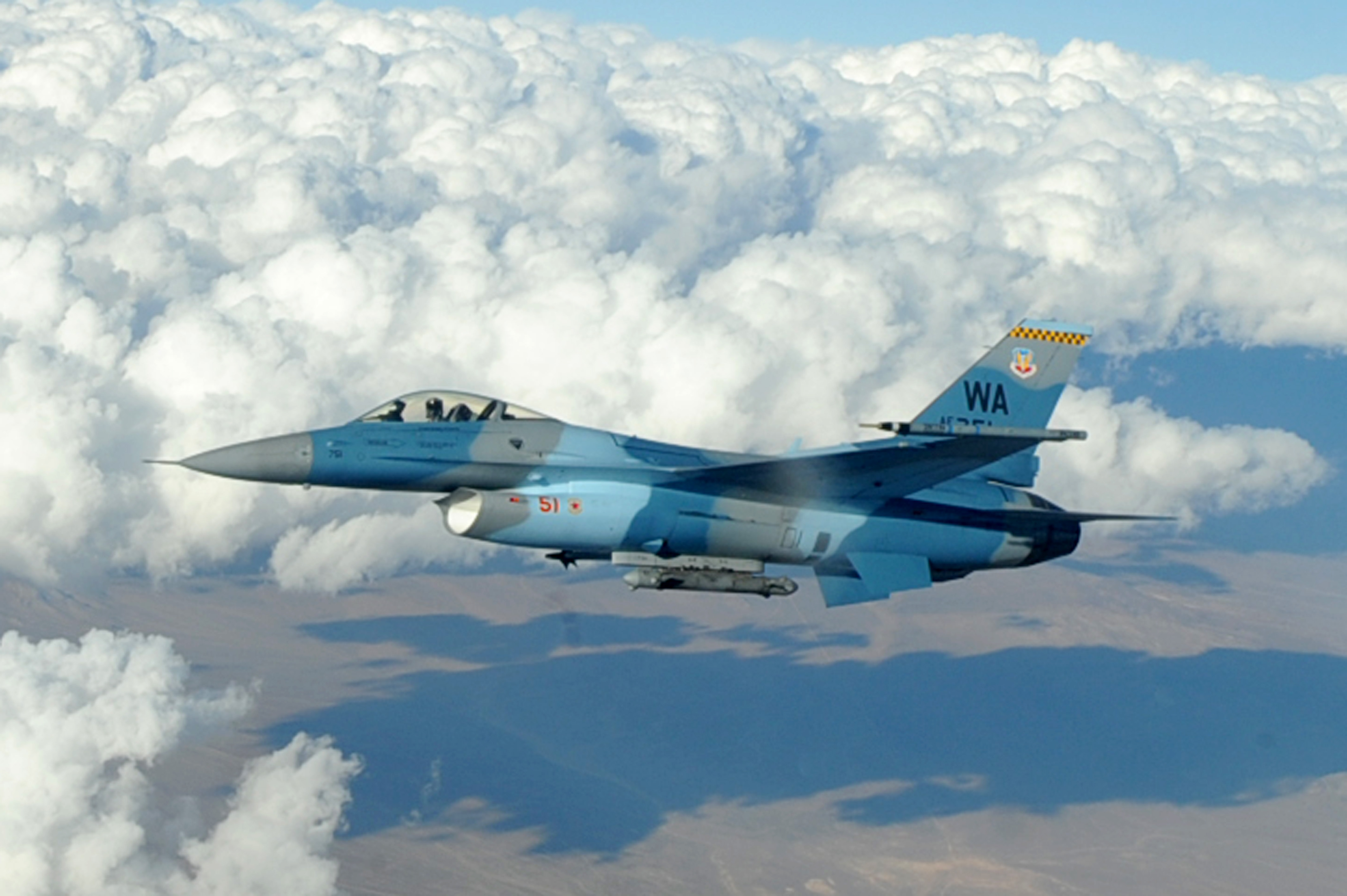
Example of positive photography: The jet and clouds crowd most of the image, removing most of the negative space, like the sky and Earth.

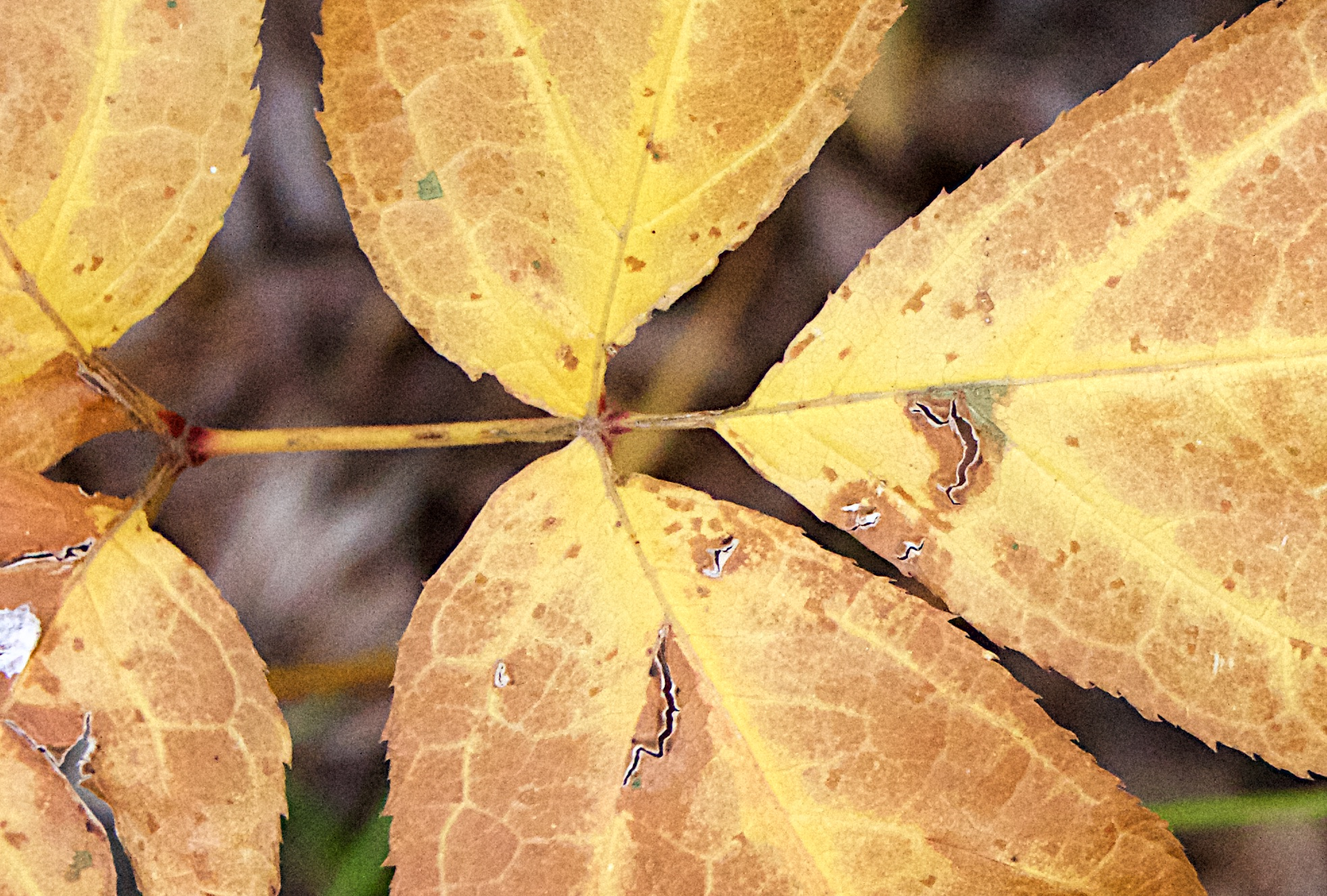
Example of positive photography: The leaves and stem are the subject of the photo and occupy most of the space.

Positive space is the idea that any part of a photo that includes the subject, stands out from the rest of the photo. It is key component in most photographs that helps convey emotions towards an audience. The technique can illustrate emotions ranging from crowdedness, to power, to chaos, or even to movement in a photo. Positive photos often busy and active so that most of the focus is drawn towards the subject. Positive space in photography is usually balanced with negative space to make an appealing composition. For example, if a photo is over-crowded and it is hard to distinguish what is and is not the subject of the photo (meaning there is a lack of definition or negative space, or there's too much negative space), then the photo may not be compositionally well thought out or perhaps fits a different style of photography like abstract.

== Positive film ==
Positive film, which is used to develop photos (slides) that would go into a slide projector, is also known as “reversal,” “slide,” or “transparency” film. It is a film or paper record of a scene that represents the color and luminance of objects in that scene with the same colors and luminance (as near as the medium will allow). Color transparencies are an example of positive photography: the range of colors presented in the medium is limited by the tonal range of the original image (dark and light areas correspond).

It is opposed to a negative where colors and luminance are reversed: this is due to the chemical or electrical processes involved in recording the scene. Positives can be turned into negatives by appropriate chemical or electronic processes. Often, with the use of digital imaging, computers can automatically complete this process. Using E-6 chemicals for processing these transparent photos and combining them with C-41 chemicals, a process known as cross processing results in highly saturated and vivid photos with different colors and brightness each time the process is done.

== History ==
When film was first made (mid-19th century), it used silver-plated copper sheets that contained three layers with light sensitive chemicals on them. Other items used to create film included leather, paper, and glass sheets. Glass sheets were the most popular due to being cheaper and more opaque than plastic sheets. By 1895 “safety film” became the new norm as it was flexible and roll-able unlike the copper and glass sheets, and it was safer than nitrate film; however, it would take until the 1930s for the modern color subtract film and positive film to finally develop. Even then, the film produced images that were too dark in color and would take an additional six years for Kodachrome, a film produced by Kodak that used color subtraction methods, to lighten the colors and film for more suitable images. Gradually over time, the process and chemicals used for the processes to make positive photography became refined and better in terms of detail, resolution, lighting, and color.
