= History of forensic photography =

Forensic science holds the branch of forensic photography which encompasses documenting both suspected and convicted criminals, and also the crime scenes, victims, and other evidence needed to make a conviction. Although photography was widely acknowledged as the most accurate way to depict and document people and objects, it was not until key developments in the late 19th century that it came to be widely accepted as a forensic means of identification.

== Overview ==
Forensic photography resulted from the modernization of criminal justice systems and the power of photographic realism. During the nineteenth and twentieth centuries, these two developments were significant to both forensic photography and police work in general. They can be attributed to a desire for accuracy. First, government bureaucracies became more professionalized and thus collected much more data about their citizens. Then, criminal justice systems began incorporating science into the procedures of police and judiciaries. The main reason, however, for the acceptance of police photography, is a conventional one. Other than its growing popularity, the widespread notion of photography was the prominent belief in the realism of the medium.

== History ==
The earliest evidence of photographic documentation of prison inmates dates back to 1843–44 in Belgium and 1851 in Denmark. This, however, was solely experimental and was yet to be ruled by technical or legal regulations. The shots ranged from mug shot resemblances, to prisoners in their cells; and the purpose of them also varied from documentation to experimentation. There was no training required and pictures were often taken by amateurs, commercial photographers, and even policemen or prison officials.

By the 1870s, the practice had spread to many countries, though limited to larger cities. Professional photographers would then be employed to take posed portraits of the criminals. This was early evidence that led to the standard mug shot known today and was unlike any previously known portraiture. Though there was no set standard yet, there was rarely creativity employed with lighting or angle. This was not like photographing portraits of families or children. These were documenting criminals. It was one of the first times people saw portraiture being used for something other than art. Though these were slowly adapted to police regulations, photographing criminals and suspects was widespread until the latter part of the 19th century, when the process of having one's picture taken and archived was limited to individuals convicted of serious offenses. This was, of course, by discretion of the police.

As the number of criminals climbed, so too did the number of photographs. Organizing and storing the archives became a problem. Collections called, "Rogues Galleries" classified criminals according to types of offenses. The earliest evidence of these galleries was found in Birmingham, England in the 1850s. Shortly after this were initial attempts at standardizing the photographs.

== Alphonse Bertillon ==
French photographer, Alphonse Bertillon was the first to realize that photographs were futile for identification if they were not standardized by using the same lighting, scale and angles. He wanted to replace traditional photographic documentation of criminals with a system that would guarantee reliable identification. He suggested anthropological studies of profiles and full-face shots to identify criminals. He published La Photographie Judiciaire (1890), which contained rules for a scientifically exact form of identification photography. He stated that the subjects should be well lit, photographed full face and also in profile, with the ear visible. Bertillon maintained that the precepts of commercial portraits should be forgotten in this type of photography. By the turn of the century, both his measurement system and photographic rules had been accepted and introduced in almost all states. Thus, Bertillon is credited with the invention of the mug shot.

Some people believe that Bertillon's methods were influenced by crude Darwinian ideas and attempted to confirm assumptions that criminals were physically distinguishable from law-abiding citizens. It is speculated in the article, "Most Wanted Photography," that it is from this system that many of the stereotype looks (skin color, eye color, hair color, body type and more) of criminals in movies, books and comics were founded. Although the measurement system was soon replaced by fingerprinting, the method of standardized photographs survived.

== Historical aspects ==
Photographic processes have been used since the emergence of Forensic Sciences, however, photography, whether analogue or digital, has occasionally been the subject of questioning. Despite being a research resource in certain cases questionable, photography when used according to scientific criteria, is an advantageous documentary resource. It allows immediate recognition of individuals and diverse subjects with better cost-benefit. Learn more about the genesis of Forensic Photography by accessing the article "Forensic Photography - historical aspects. Urgency for a new focus in Brazil". Article published in Revista Brasileira de Criminalística has almost 12,000 accesses.

Available at: Doi:https://doi.org/10.15260/rbc.v6i1.144 and https://www.researchgate.net/publication/316052381_Forensic_Photography_-_Historical_Aspects_Urgency_of_a_new_focus_in_Brazil_-_English_version

== Crime photography ==
On the other side of the spectrum of forensic photography, is the crime photography that involves documenting the scene of the crime, rather than the criminal. Though this type of forensic photography was also created for the purpose of documenting, identifying and convicting, it allows more room for creative interpretation and variance of style. It includes taking pictures of the victim (scars, wounds, birthmarks, etc.) for the purpose of identification or conviction; and pictures of the scene (placement of objects, position of body, photos of evidence and fingerprints). The development of this type of forensic photography is responsible for radical changes in the field, including public involvement (crime photos appearing in the newspaper) and new interpretations and purposes of the field. Weiner.

Bertillon was also the first to methodically photograph and document crime scenes. He did this both at ground level and overhead, which he called "God's-eye-view." While his mug shots encourage people to find differences (from themselves) in physical characteristics of criminals, his crime scene photographs revealed similarities to the public. This made people question, when looking in a newspaper at pictures of a murder that took place in a home that resembles their own, "could this happen to me?" For the first time, people other than criminologists, police or forensic photographers were seeing the effects of crime through forensic photography.

== Weegee ==
Among the more famous, and arguably the most famous crime photographer, is Arthur Fellig, better known as "Weegee". He was known for routinely arriving at crime scenes before other reporters, or often even before the police, The nickname is speculated to come from an alternate spelling of the word "Ouija", implying that Fellig had a supernatural force telling where the action was going to occur. His first exhibition was a solo exhibition, entitled, "Weegee: Murder is My Business" and showed in 1941 at the Photo League in New York. The Museum of Modern Art purchased five of his photos and showed them in an exhibit called "Action Photography." Forensic photography had now transcended mere documentation. It was considered an art. Weegee did not consider his photos art, but many perceived them that way. He is a prime example of the different purposes of forensic photography. His photographs were intended as documentation and were viewed that way in the paper by many people, but were shown in museums and seen as art by many others. His first book was published in 1945 and was titled, Naked City.

== Future ==
With technology like digital photography becoming more common, forensic photography continues to advance and now includes many categories where specialists are required to perform more sophisticated tasks. The use of infrared and ultraviolet light is used for trace evidence photography of fingerprints, tiny blood samples and many other things. Necropsy photographs, or photographs taken both before and after the victim's clothing is removed. These photos include close-ups of scars, tattoos, wounds, teeth marks and anything else that would help in identifying the victim, or determining his or her time and cause of death.
