= Packshot =

Still image of a product for advertising purposes

A packshot (also pack shot) is a still or moving image of a product, usually including its packaging and labeling, used to portray the product's reputation in advertising on TV. or other media. Its goal is to trigger in-store, on-shelf product recognition. The term packshot also refers to product placement in a movie or television show. Packshots often dominate television commercials, taking from two to five seconds of a thirty-second commercial. Forged or leaked packshots for unreleased products have led to controversy or increased interest in the product. Packshots can be a simple photograph of the product on a white background or can entail the use of elaborate props. Products sold as digital downloads, such as software, sometimes have digitally generated packshots when no physical product or packaging exists.

Packshots can be produced either by photographers or by machines.

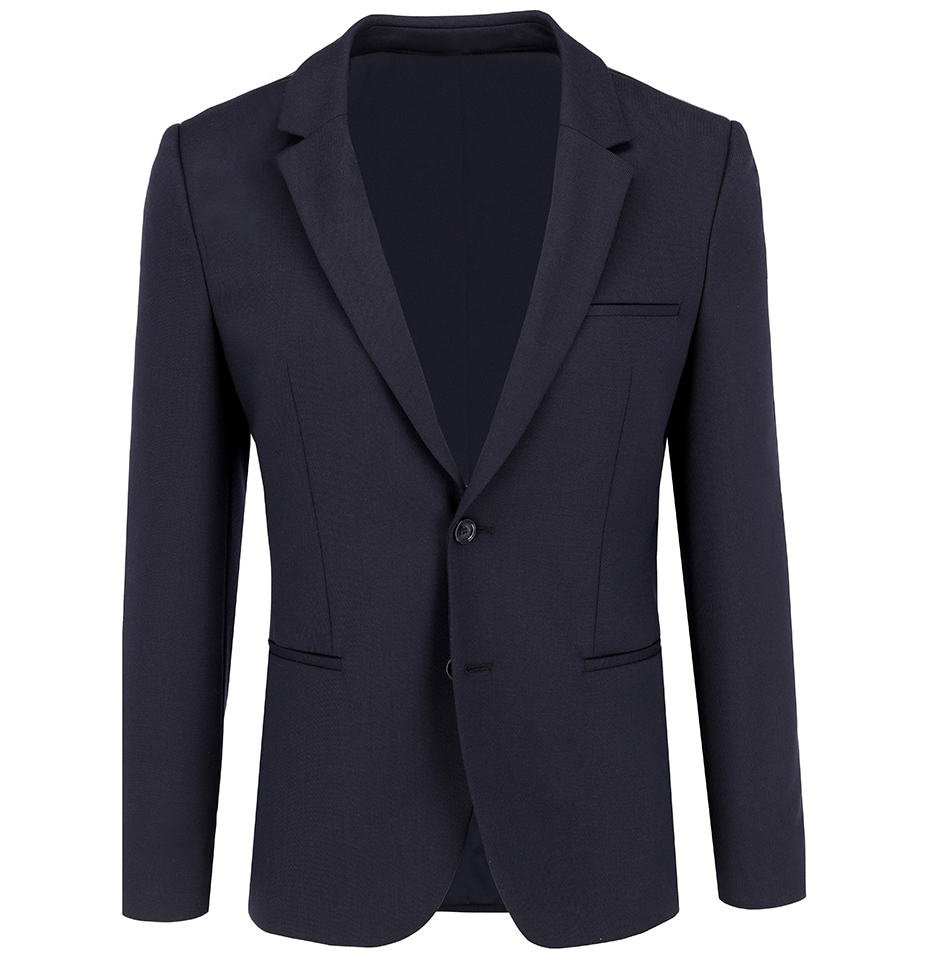
Packshot of a jacket

Example of a 3D packshot image
