= National Register of Historic Places listings in Labette County, Kansas =

Location of Labette County in Kansas

This is a list of the National Register of Historic Places listings in Labette County, Kansas.

This is intended to be a complete list of the properties and districts on the National Register of Historic Places in Labette County, Kansas, United States. The locations of National Register properties and districts for which the latitude and longitude coordinates are included below, may be seen in a map.

There are 14 properties and districts listed on the National Register in the county. One property was once listed but has since been removed.

This National Park Service list is complete through NPS recent listings posted November 13, 2026.

== Current listings ==
| | Name on the Register | Image | Date listed | Location | City or town | Description |
|---|---|---|---|---|---|---|
| 1 | Big Hill Archeological District | | November 23, 1977 (#77000584) | Address restricted | Dennis | |
| 2 | Carnegie Library | Carnegie Library | April 14, 1976 (#76000824) | 17th and Broadway; 37°20′23″N 95°15′39″W | Parsons | |
| 3 | First State Bank | First State Bank | November 1, 1982 (#82000417) | Southwestern corner of Delaware and Main Sts. 37°03′24″N 95°21′34″W | Edna | |
| 4 | Harmon Site | | May 9, 1983 (#83000429) | Address restricted | Chetopa | |
| 5 | Harmon Site No. 2 (14LT323) | | May 7, 1984 (#84001239) | Address restricted | Chetopa | |
| 6 | Labette Creek Tributary Bridge | Labette Creek Tributary Bridge | July 2, 1985 (#85001431) | Off U.S. Route 160, 2.3 miles (3.7 km) west of Parsons; 37°20′38″N 95°19′33″W | Parsons | |
| 7 | Oakwood Cemetery | Oakwood Cemetery | May 9, 2024 (#100010344) | 300 South Leawood Drive; 37°20′12″N 95°14′25″W | Parsons | |
| 7 | Oswego Public Carnegie Library | Oswego Public Carnegie Library | June 25, 1987 (#87000956) | 704 4th St. 37°10′01″N 95°06′27″W | Oswego | |
| 8 | The Parsonian Hotel | The Parsonian Hotel | April 14, 2015 (#15000145) | 1725 Broadway Ave. 37°20′23″N 95°15′44″W | Parsons | |
| 9 | Parsons Filled Arch Bridge | | July 2, 1985 (#85001436) | Off U.S. Route 160, 1 mile (1.6 km) east and 1.2 miles (1.9 km) south of Parsons; 37°19′09″N 95°13′51″W | Parsons | |
| 10 | Parsons Katy Hospital | Parsons Katy Hospital | January 31, 2008 (#07001482) | 400 Katy Ave. 37°20′37″N 95°16′59″W | Parsons | |
| 11 | Pumpkin Creek Tributary Bridge | | July 2, 1985 (#85001439) | 2 miles (3.2 km) west of Mound Valley; 37°12′24″N 95°26′19″W | Mound Valley | |
| 12 | Riverside Park | | July 17, 2012 (#12000412) | N. Oregon St. 37°10′30″N 95°06′03″W | Oswego | part of the New Deal-Era Resources of Kansas Multiple Property Submission |
| 13 | US Post Office-Oswego | US Post Office-Oswego | October 17, 1989 (#89001648) | 819 4th St. 37°10′04″N 95°06′38″W | Oswego | |

== Former listings ==
| | Name on the Register | Image | Date listed | Date removed | Location | City or town | Description |
|---|---|---|---|---|---|---|---|
| 1 | East Side School | | July 11, 2002 (#02000762) | August 16, 2010 | Iowa St. 37°10′07″N 95°06′19″W | Oswego | |

== See also ==
- List of National Historic Landmarks in Kansas
- National Register of Historic Places listings in Kansas
