= Bloody Benders =

American family of serial killers

Coordinates: 37.349°N 95.486°W

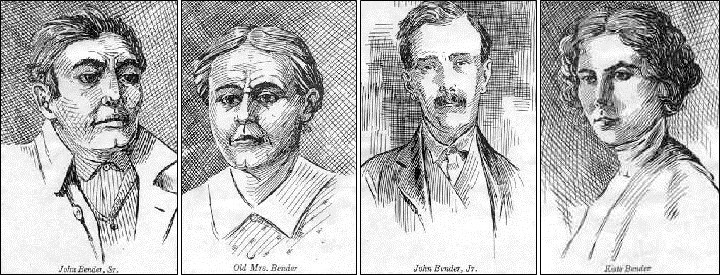
- From The Benders in Kansas (1913)
- Other names: John Bender Sr.; Kate Bender Sr.; Kate Bender Jr.; John Bender Jr.

Details
- Victims: 11+
- Span of crimes: 1871–1873
- Country: United States
- State: Kansas
- Locations: Labette County, Kansas (11 km or 7 mi NE of Cherryvale)

The Bender family, more well known as the Bloody Benders, were a family of serial killers in Labette County, Kansas, United States, from May 1871 to December 1872. The family supposedly consisted of John Bender, his wife Kate Sr. (or Elvira), their son John Jr. and their daughter Kate Jr. Contemporary newspaper accounts reported that the Benders' neighbors claimed John Jr. and Kate were actually husband and wife, possibly via a common-law marriage.

Estimates report that the Benders killed at least a dozen travelers and perhaps as many as 20 before they were discovered. The family's fate remains unknown, with theories ranging from a lynching to an escape. Much folklore and legend surround the Benders, making it difficult to separate fact from fiction.

== Background ==
In October 1870, five families of spiritualists homesteaded in and around the township of Osage in northwestern Labette County, approximately 11 km (7 mi) northeast of where Cherryvale was established seven months later. One of these families was John Bender and John Bender Jr., who registered 65 ha (160 acres) of land located adjacent to the Great Osage Trail, the only open road for traveling farther west. After a cabin, a barn with a corral, and a well were built, Elvira and Kate arrived in the fall of 1871.

The Benders divided their cabin into two rooms with a canvas wagon cover. They used the smaller room at the rear for living quarters and the front room as a "general store" where they sold dry goods. The front section also contained the kitchen and dining table, where travelers could stop for a meal or spend the night. Elvira and Kate also planted a 0.8 ha (2 acres) vegetable garden and apple orchard north of the cabin.

== Bender family ==
John Bender Sr. was around sixty years old and spoke little English; the English he did speak was guttural and usually unintelligible. According to the May 23, 1873, edition of The Emporia News, he was identified with the name William Bender. Elvira Bender was 55 years old. She allegedly spoke little English and was so unfriendly that her neighbors called her a "she-devil." John Bender Jr. was around 25 years old and handsome, with auburn hair and a moustache. He spoke English fluently with a German accent. He was prone to laughing aimlessly, which led many to consider him a "half-wit." Kate Bender, who was around 23, was cultivated and attractive and spoke English well, with little accent. A self-proclaimed healer and psychic, she distributed flyers advertising her supernatural powers and her ability to cure illnesses. She also conducted séances and gave lectures on spiritualism, for which she gained notoriety by advocating free love. Kate's popularity became a large attraction for the Benders' inn. Although the elder Benders kept to themselves, Kate and her brother regularly attended Sunday school in nearby Harmony Grove.

The Benders were widely believed to be German immigrants. No documentation or definitive proof of their relationships to one another or where they were born has ever been found. John Bender Sr. was from either Germany, Norway, or the Netherlands, and was claimed to be a John Flickinger, although it has been proven that he was in fact not John Bender. According to contemporary newspapers, Elvira was born Almira Hill Mark (often misreported as "Meik") in the Adirondack Mountains; she married Simon Mark, with whom she claimed to have had 12 children. Later she married William Stephen Griffith. Elvira was rumored to have murdered several husbands, but none of these rumors were ever proven. Kate was purportedly Elvira's fifth daughter. Some of the Benders' neighbors claimed that John Jr. and Kate were not brother and sister, but husband and wife.

According to author Lee Ralph, the Bender's origins could be traced to Germany and France, eventually arriving in the US, and in the 1870 census showing John, age 53, Mary, age 49, John, age 24 and Catherine, age 13 living in Decatur, Illinois. Said census record showed all Benders born in Germany, with the exception of Catherine who was born in France.

=== Contemporary descriptions ===
From those who knew them and have written about the Benders:

- "The old man was a repulsive, hideous brute, without a redeeming trait, dirty, profane, and ill-tempered."
- "Old Mrs. Bender was a dirty old Dutch crone. Her face was a fit picture of the midnight hag that wove the spell murderous ambition about the soul of Macbeth."
- "Young Bender, seen when excited, recalled the grave-robbing hyena at once to mind."
- "'Kate proclaimed herself responsible to no one save herself.' She professed to be a medium of spiritualism and delivered lectures on that subject. In her lectures she publicly declared that murder might be a dictation for good; that in what the world might deem villainy, her soul might read bravery, nobility, and humanity. She advocated 'free love', and denounced all social regulations for the promotion of purity and the prevention of carnality, which she called 'miserable requirements of self-constituted society.' She maintained carnal relations with her brother, and boldly proclaimed her right to do so in the following words found in her lecture manuscript: 'Shall we confine ourselves to a single love, and deny our natures their proper sway? ...Even though it be a brother's passion for his own sister, I say it should not be smothered.'"

== Deaths and disappearances ==
In May 1871, the body of a man named Jones was discovered in Drum Creek with a cut throat and crushed skull. The owner of the Drum Creek claim was suspected but no action was taken. In February 1872, the bodies of two men were found with the same injuries as Jones. By 1873, reports of missing people who had passed through the area had become so common that travelers began to avoid the trail. The area was already widely known for "horse thieves and villains", and vigilance committees often "arrested" some for the disappearances, only for them to be later released by the authorities. Many innocent men under suspicion were also run out of the county by these committees.

=== Downfall ===
In the winter of 1872, George Newton Longcor left Independence, Kansas, with his infant daughter Mary Ann to resettle in Iowa; they were never seen again. In the spring of 1873, Longcor's former neighbor, Dr. William Henry York, went looking for them and questioned homesteaders along the trail. York reached Fort Scott, and on March 9 began the return journey to Independence, but never arrived.

York had two brothers: Ed York living in Fort Scott and Colonel Alexander M. York, a US Civil War veteran, lawyer, and member of the Kansas State Senate from Independence. Both knew of William's travel plans and, when he failed to return, began a search for the missing doctor. Colonel York, leading a company of some fifty men, questioned every traveler along the trail and visited all the area homesteads.

On March 28, 1873, Colonel York arrived at the Benders' inn with a Mr. Johnson, explaining that his brother had gone missing and asking if they had seen him. They admitted Dr. York had stayed with them and suggested the possibility that he had run into trouble with Native Indians. Colonel York agreed that this was possible and remained for dinner. On April 3, Colonel York returned to the inn with armed men after learning that a woman had fled the inn after Elvira Bender had threatened her with knives. Elvira allegedly could not understand English, while the younger Benders denied the claim.

When York repeated the claim, Elvira became enraged, saying the woman was a witch who had cursed her coffee and ordered the men to leave her house, revealing for the first time that "her sense of the English language" was much better than was let on. Before York left, Kate asked him to return alone the following Friday night, and she would use her clairvoyant abilities to help him find his brother. The men with York were convinced that the Benders and a neighboring family, the Roaches, were guilty and wanted to hang them all, but York insisted that evidence must be found.

Around that time, neighboring communities began to make accusations that the Osage community was responsible for the disappearances, and the Osage township arranged a meeting in the Harmony Grove schoolhouse. Seventy-five locals attended the meeting, including Colonel York and possibly both John Bender and John Bender Jr. After discussing the disappearances, including that of William York, they agreed to obtain a warrant to search every homestead between Big Hill Creek and Drum Creek. Despite York's strong suspicions regarding the Benders since his visit several weeks earlier, no one had watched them, and it was not noticed for several days that they had fled.

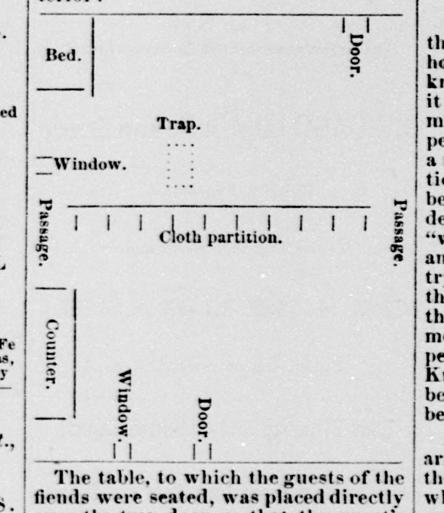
Diagram of the Bender Inn Wichita City Eagle (Wichita, KS), May 22, 1873.

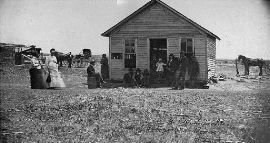
Bender Inn the day after the gravedigging began

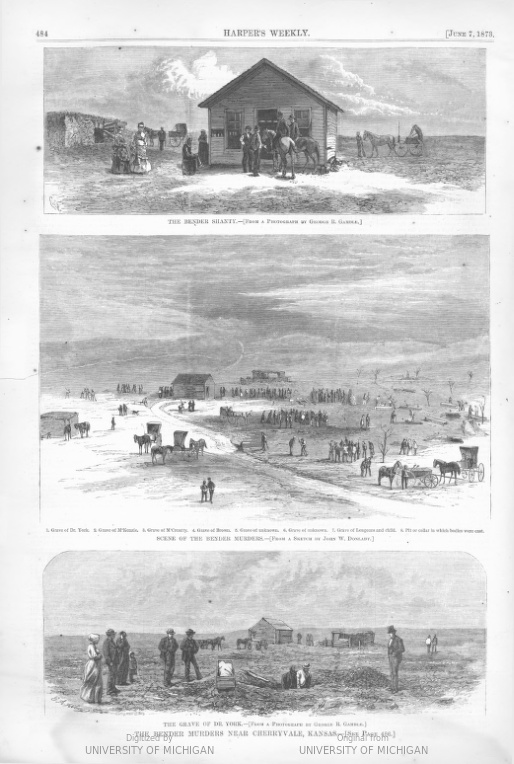
Sketches showing the Bender Inn; view of the Bender orchard; finding of Dr. York's body

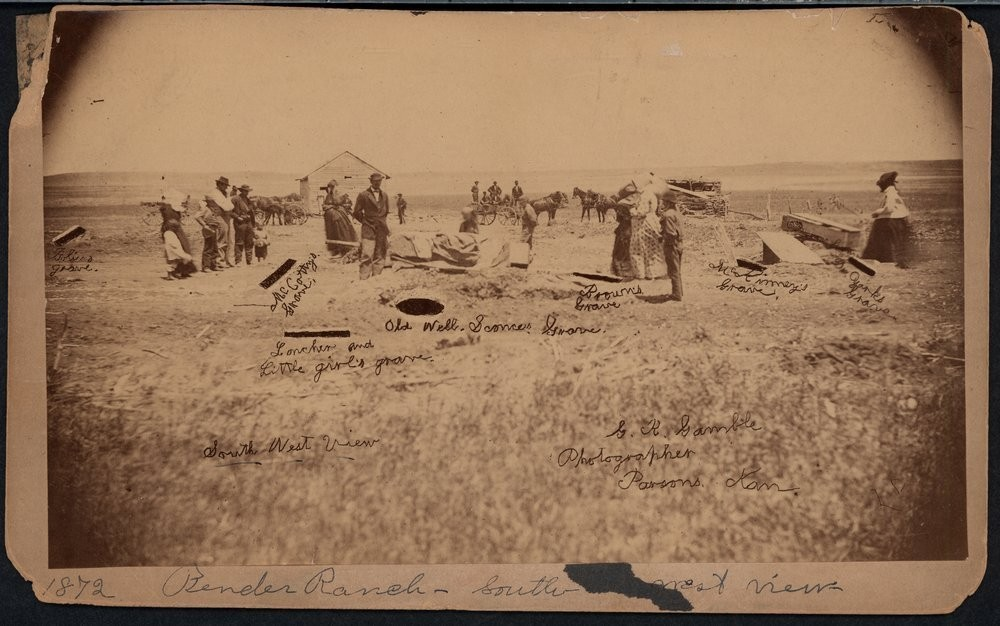
Photograph of Bender Victims' graves, Dr. York's grave at far right

Three days after the township meeting, Billy Tole was driving cattle past the Bender property when he noticed that the inn was abandoned and the farm animals were unfed. Tole reported the fact to the township trustee, but due to inclement weather, several days lapsed before the abandonment could be investigated. The township trustee called for volunteers, and several hundred turned out to form a search party that included Colonel York. When the party arrived at the inn they found the cabin empty of food, clothing, and possessions.

A bad odor was noticed and traced to a trap door underneath a bed, nailed shut. After opening the trap, the party found clotted blood on the floor of the empty room underneath, 1.8 m (6 ft) deep and 0.65 m^{2} (7 sq ft) at the top by 0.3 m^{2} (3 sq ft) at the bottom. They broke up the stone slab floor with sledgehammers but found no bodies, and determined that the smell was from blood that had soaked into the soil. The men then physically lifted the cabin and moved it to the side to dig under it, but no bodies were found.

They then probed the ground around the cabin with a metal rod, especially in the disturbed soil of the vegetable garden and orchard, where Dr. York's body was found later that evening, buried face down with his feet barely below the surface. The probing continued until midnight, with another nine suspected grave sites marked before the men were satisfied they had found them all and retired for the night. The next morning, another eight bodies were found in seven of the nine suspected graves, while one was found in the well, along with several body parts. All but one had their heads bashed with a hammer and throats cut, and newspapers reported that all were "indecently mutilated". The body of a young girl was found with no injuries sufficient to cause death. It was speculated that she had been strangled or buried alive.

A Kansas newspaper reported that the crowd was so incensed after finding the bodies that a friend of the Benders named Brockman, who was among the onlookers, was hanged from a beam in the inn until unconscious, revived, interrogated, then hanged again. After the third hanging, they released him and he staggered home "as one who was drunken or deranged".

A Roman Catholic prayer book was found in the house with notes inside written in German, which were later translated. The texts read "Johannah Bender. Born July 30, 1848", "John Gebhardt came to America on July 1 18??", and in an old bible also found in the house "big slaughter day, Jan eighth" and "hell departed".

Word of the murders spread quickly, and more than 3,000 people, including reporters from as far away as New York City and Chicago, visited the site. The Bender cabin was destroyed by souvenir hunters who took everything, including the bricks that lined the cellar and the stones lining the well. State Senator Alexander York offered a US$1,000 ($26,875 as of 2025) reward for the family's arrest. On May 17, Kansas Governor Thomas A. Osborn offered a $2,000 ($53,750 as of 2025) reward for the apprehension of all four.

=== Killing method ===
It is conjectured that when a guest stayed at the Benders' bed and breakfast inn, the hosts would give the guest a seat of honor at the table that was positioned over a trap door into the cellar. With the victim's back to the curtain, Kate would distract the guest while John Bender or his son came from behind the curtain and struck the guest on the right side of the skull with a hammer. One of the women would cut the victim's throat to ensure death, and the body was then dropped through the trap door. Once in the cellar, the body would be stripped and later buried somewhere on the property, often in the orchard. Although some of the victims were wealthy, others carried little of value, and it was surmised that the Benders had killed them simply for the sheer thrill.

Testimony from people who had stayed at the Benders' inn and managed to escape before they could be killed appeared to support the presumed execution method of the Benders. William Pickering said that when he had refused to sit near the wagon cloth because of the stains on it, Kate Bender had threatened him with a knife, whereupon he fled the premises. A Catholic priest, Father Paul Ponziglione, claimed to have seen one of the Bender men concealing a large hammer, at which point he became uncomfortable and quickly departed, making the excuse that he needed to tend to his horse. However, Ponziglione only claimed to have had an encounter after the Benders' crimes were revealed, making his account unreliable.

The Bender family sold stolen goods such as horses, saddles, clothes, and other possessions under the guise that people who spent the night and were unable to pay would pay with goods. At another time, a Mrs. Fitts, while sitting at dinner, became uneasy and sensed a muffled movement behind the canvas. Kate issued a command, but before anything could happen, the terrified Fitts fled.

Two men who had traveled to the inn to experience Kate Bender's psychic powers stayed for dinner but refused to sit at the table next to the cloth, instead preferring to eat their meal at the main shop counter. Kate then became abusive toward them, and shortly afterwards the Bender men emerged from behind the cloth. At this point, the customers felt uneasy and decided to leave. More than a dozen bullet holes were found in the roof and sides of the cabin. The media speculated that some of the victims had attempted to fight back after being hit with the hammer.

== Escape ==
Detectives following wagon tracks discovered the Benders' wagon, abandoned with a starving team of horses with one of the mares lame, just outside the city limits of Thayer, 19 km (12 mi) north of the inn. It was confirmed that the family had bought tickets on the Leavenworth, Lawrence & Galveston Railroad for Humboldt. At Chanute, John Jr. and Kate left the train and caught the MK&T train south to the terminus near Denison, Texas. From there, they traveled to an outlaw colony thought to be in the border region between Texas and New Mexico. They were not pursued, as lawmen following outlaws into this region often never returned.

One detective later claimed that he had traced the pair to the border, where he had found that John Jr. had died of apoplexy. The elder Benders did not leave the train at Humboldt, but instead continued north to Kansas City, where it is believed they purchased tickets for St. Louis, Missouri. Several groups of vigilantes were formed to search for the Benders. Many stories say that one vigilante group caught the Benders and shot all of them but Kate, whom they burned alive. Another group claimed they had caught the Benders and lynched them before throwing their bodies into the Verdigris River. Yet another claimed to have killed the Benders during a gunfight and buried their bodies on the prairie. No one ever claimed the $3,000 reward ($80,625 as of 2025). The story of the Benders' escape spread, and the search continued on and off for the next 50 years. Often two women traveling together were accused of being Kate Bender and her mother.

In 1884, it was reported that a John Flickinger had committed suicide in Lake Michigan. Also in 1884, an elderly man matching John Bender Sr.'s description was arrested in Montana for a murder committed near Salmon, Idaho, where the victim had been killed by a hammer blow to the head. A message requesting positive identification was sent to Cherryvale, but the suspect severed his foot to escape his leg irons and bled to death. By the time a deputy from Cherryvale arrived, identification was impossible due to decomposition. Despite the lack of identification, the man's skull was displayed as that of "Pa Bender" in a Salmon saloon until Prohibition forced its closure in 1920 and the skull disappeared. Whether John Flickinger was John Bender is unknown.

== Arrests ==
Several weeks after the discovery of the bodies, Addison Roach and his son-in-law, William Buxton, were arrested as accessories. In total, twelve men "of bad repute in general" were arrested, including Brockman. All had been involved in disposing of the victims' stolen goods with Mit Cherry, a member of the vigilance committee, implicated for forging a letter from one of the victims, informing the man's wife that he had arrived safely at his destination in Illinois. Brockman would be arrested again 23 years later for the rape and murder of his 18-year-old daughter.

On October 31, 1889, it was reported that Mrs. Almira Monroe (aka Mrs. Almira Griffith) and Mrs. Sarah Eliza Davis had been arrested in Niles, Michigan (often misreported as Detroit), several weeks earlier for larceny. They were released after being found not guilty but were then immediately re-arrested for the Bender murders. According to the Pittsburgh Dispatch, the daughter of one of the Benders' victims, Mrs. Frances E. McCann, had reported the pair to authorities in early October after tracking them down. Mrs. McCann's story came from dreams about her father's murder, which she discussed with Sarah Eliza. The women's identities were later confirmed by two Osage township witnesses from a tintype photograph. In mid-October, Deputy Sheriff LeRoy Dick, the Osage Township trustee who had headed the search of the Bender property, arrived in Michigan and arrested the couple on October 30, following their release on the larceny charges. Mrs. Monroe resisted, declaring that she would not be taken alive, but was subdued by local deputies.

Mrs. Davis claimed that Mrs. Monroe was Elvira Bender, but that she was not Kate but her sister Sarah; she later signed an affidavit to that effect, while Monroe continued to deny the identification and in turn accused Sarah Eliza of being the real Kate Bender. Deputy Sheriff Dick, along with Mrs. McCann, escorted the pair to Oswego, Kansas, where seven members of a 13-member panel confirmed the identification and committed them for trial. Another of Mrs. Monroe's daughters, Mary Gardei, later provided an affidavit claiming that her mother (then Almira Shearer), under the name of Almira Marks, was serving two years in the Detroit House of Corrections in 1872 for the manslaughter of her daughter-in-law, Emily Mark. Records of the incarceration back up this affidavit. At her hearing, Mrs. Monroe denied any knowledge of Shearer or the manslaughter charge and remained incarcerated with her daughter.

Originally scheduled for February 1890, the trial was held over to May. Mrs. Monroe now admitted she had married a Mr. Shearer in 1872 and claimed she had previously denied it, as she did not want the court to know that her name was Shearer at that time and that she had a conviction for manslaughter. Their attorney also produced a marriage certificate indicating that Mrs. Davis had been married in Michigan in 1872, the time when several of the murders were committed. Eyewitness testimony was given that Mrs. Monroe was Elvira Bender. Judge Calvin dismissed Mary Gardei's affidavit as she was a "chip off the old block"; he found that other affidavits supporting Gardei's were sufficient proof that the women could never be convicted, and he discharged them both. The affidavits and other papers are missing from the file in LaBette County, so further examination is impossible. Several researchers question the ready acceptance of the affidavit's authenticity and suggest that the county was unwilling to accept the expense of boarding the two women for an extended period. While the two women were certainly criminals and liars, as their defense attorney admitted, the charges were weak and many people doubted their identification as the Benders. The older woman reportedly spoke with no accent whereas Ma Bender struggled to speak English fluently.

== Victims ==
- 1) May 1871: William Baldwin Jones. A body was found in Drum Creek with a crushed skull and throat cut.
- 2–3) February 1872: Two unidentified men were found on the prairie in February 1872 with crushed skulls and throats cut.
- 4) December 1872: Ben Brown. From Howard County, Kansas. $2,600 (2025: $69,875) missing. Buried in the apple orchard.
- 5) December 1872: W.F. McCrotty. Co D 123rd Ill Infantry. $38 (2025: $1,021) and a wagon with a team of horses missing.
- 6) December 1872: Henry McKenzie. Relocating to Independence from Hamilton County, Indiana. $36 (2025: $968) and a matched team of horses missing.
- 7) December 1872: Johnny Boyle. From Howard County, Kansas. $10 (2025: $269), a pacing mare, and an $850 (2025: $22,844) saddle missing. Found in the Benders' well.
- 8–9) December 1872: George Newton Longcor and his 18-month-old daughter, Mary Ann. Contemporary newspapers reported his name as either "George W. Longcor" or "George Loncher," while Mary Ann is similarly reported as being either eight years old or 18 months old. According to the 1870 census, George and his wife, Mary Jane, were neighbors of Charles Ingalls and family in Independence, while his wife's parents lived two houses away. After the deaths of his infant son, Robert, from pneumonia in May 1871 and his 21-year-old wife, Mary Jane (née Gilmore), following the birth of Mary Ann several months later, George was likely returning to the home of his parents, Anthony and Mary (Hughes) Longcor, in Lee County, Iowa. In preparation for his return to Iowa, George had purchased a team of horses from his neighbor, Dr. William Henry York, who later went looking for George and was also murdered; both were Civil War veterans. $1,900 (2025: $51,063) missing. The daughter was thought to have been buried alive, but this was unproven. No injuries were found on her body, and she was fully clothed, including mittens and a hood. Both were buried together in the apple orchard.
- 10) December 1872: John Greary. Buried in the apple orchard.
- 11) December 1872: Red Smith. Buried in the apple orchard.
- 12) December 1872: Abigail Roberts. Buried in the apple orchard.
- 13–15) December 1872: Various body parts. The parts did not belong to any of the other victims found and are believed to belong to at least three additional victims.
- 16–19) December 1872: During the search, the bodies of four unidentified males were found in Drum Creek and the surrounds. All four had crushed skulls and throats cut. One may have been Jack Bogart, whose horse was purchased from a friend of the Benders after he went missing in 1872.
- 20) May 1873: Dr. William York. $2,000 (2025: $53,750) missing. Buried in the apple orchard.

By including the recovered body parts not matched to the bodies found, the finds are speculated to represent the remains of more than 20 victims. Except for McKenzie and York, who were buried in Independence; the Longcors, who were buried in Montgomery County; and McCrotty, who was buried in Parsons, Kansas, none of the other bodies were claimed, and they were reburied at the base of a small hill 1.6 km (1 mi) southeast of the Benders' orchard, one of several at the location now known as "The Benders Mounds".

The search of the cabin resulted in the recovery of three hammers: a shoe hammer, a claw hammer, and a sledgehammer that appeared to match indentations in some of the skulls. These hammers were given to the Bender Museum in 1967 by the son of LeRoy Dick, the Osage Township trustee who headed the search for the Bender property. The hammers were displayed at the Bender Museum in Cherryvale, Kansas from 1967 to 1978 when the site was acquired for a fire station. When attempts were made to relocate the museum it became a point of controversy, some locals objecting to the town being known for the Bender murders. The Bender artefacts were eventually given to the Cherryvale Museum, where they remain in a wall-mounted display case. A knife with a four-inch tapered blade was reportedly found hidden in a mantel clock in the Bender house by Colonel York. In 1923 it was donated to the Kansas Museum of History by York's wife but is not on display; still bearing reddish-brown stains on the blade, it can be seen upon request.

A historical marker describing the Benders' crimes is located in the rest area at the junction of U.S. Route 400 and U.S. Route 169 north of Cherryvale.

== Connection to the Kelly Family ==
According to a news report from contemporary media, an unnamed man from Kansas City, who had investigated the Bender family's house and the rumors of their deaths, claimed that The Kelly Family were the Benders. The man further elaborated that all the stories of the latter's capture were made up, supposedly by a group of confederates, who had also helped the Benders dispose of the murdered victims' horses and wagons. He pointed out that both families' modus operandi, family unit numbers and other evidence proved that they are the same.

== Connection to the Ingalls family ==
The Ingalls family, made famous in the children's books by Laura Ingalls Wilder and Little House on the Prairie television series, lived near Independence, and Wilder mentioned the Bender family in her writing and speeches. In 1937, she gave a speech at a book fair which was later transcribed and printed in the September 1978 Saturday Evening Post and in the 1988 book A Little House Sampler. She said her father joined in a vigilante hunt for the killers and when he spoke of later searches for them she recalled, "At such times Pa always said in a strange tone of finality, 'They will never be found'. They were never found and later I formed my own conclusions why". Rose Wilder Lane, her mother's collaborator and editor on the Little House books, regularly wrote sensational stories, and included or hinted at her family's links to the Bloody Benders, usually via an added an anecdote to written drafts of her mother's speeches. This was ostensibly to engage public interest, if not historical fact. The story of "The Bloody Benders," however, was not included in Wilder's original Pioneer Girl manuscript. Some have cast doubt on the story, saying that Wilder would have been only four years old when her family moved from the area and that the Benders were exposed in 1873, two years after the Ingalls family left.

== Popular culture ==
=== Literature ===
- Anthony Boucher's 1943 short story "They Bite" is set at a Western oasis where the "Carkers" once killed and ate travelers; the hypothesis is floated that they were the Benders (who, in this telling, ate their victims) having undergone a supernatural transformation after leaving Kansas.
- Candle of the Wicked (1960), by Manly Wade Wellman, recounts the events leading up to the discovery of the Bender killings.
- The Bloody Benders (1970) by Robert Adleman is a fictional account of the family and murders. ISBN 978-0-8128-1290-9
- The Western novel The Hell Benders (1999) by Ken Hodgson focuses on the manhunt for the Benders after the discovery of their crimes. ISBN 978-0-7860-0670-0
- In Neil Gaiman's novel American Gods (2001), the main character Shadow and his associates Mr. Nancy and Chernobog visit a clearing near Cherryvale, Kansas. Mr. Nancy tells Shadow that a group of people (the Benders) used to make human sacrifices to Chernobog in the clearing. Chernobog, a Russian deity, drew sustenance and power from the murders because the Benders used his chosen instrument, a hammer. ISBN 0-380-97365-0
- The novel Cottonwood (2004), by Scott Phillips, features Kate Bender in a supporting role; the second half of the book takes place during the trial of two alleged surviving members of the Bender family. ISBN 978-0-345-46101-8
- In Lyle Brandt's novel The Lawman: Massacre Trail (2009), the Benders are responsible for several homestead killings and are brought down by Marshal Jack Slade. ISBN 978-0-425-22830-2
- The novel Hell's Half-Acre by Nicholas Nicastro (2015) retells the Bender murder spree. ISBN 978-1-5390-4867-1
- All the Blood We Share: A Novel of the Bloody Benders of Kansas by Camilla Bruce was published in 2022. ISBN 978-0-593-10259-6
- Nghi Vo said that her 2024 short story "Stitched to Skin Like Family Is" was inspired in part by the Bloody Benders.

=== Film ===
- Bender (2016), produced by JC Guest and directed by John Alexander with Casadelic Pictures, is an experimental art house cult thriller starring James Karen.
- Hell's Half-Acre (2027) directed by Nicholas Nicastro is a gothic western horror film based on his novel of the same title starring JoHannah James (Kate Bender), Christopher Kahler (Pa Bender), Josh Bloom (Junior Bender), and Kristin Samuelson (Almira Bender). The cast also includes Bill Moseley, Grainger Hines, and London May. A short proof-of-concept film Hell's Half Acre: Sojourn (2025) was released prior with the Bender family cast and won several awards.

=== Graphic Novels ===
- Geary, Rick. The Saga of the Bloody Benders. New York: NBM Comics Lit; 2008. ISBN 978-1-56163-499-6
- Fitzell, Michael. Bender: The Complete Saga. David Frizell, artist. Skye Press, 2018. ISBN 978-1-63373-439-5
- Johns, Geoff. Redcoat, Volume 2 (chapter 8). Portland, OR: Image Comics/Ghost Machine Productions; 2025

ISBN 978-1-5343-2124-3

=== Music ===
- The metal band Macabre have a song, "The Bloody Benders," about the family.
- Japanese doom metal band Church of Misery open their 2016 album And Then There Were None with a song about the Benders entitled "The Hell Benders".

=== Television ===
- 1954 Western television series Stories of the Century Episode 4, titled "Kate Bender," focused on only the son and daughter.
- The Big Valley Season 3, Episode 6 "Ladykiller" (1967) is based on the Benders including travelers murdered with a hammer from behind a tarp.
- Supernatural Season 1, Episode 15 (2006), titled "The Benders," alludes to the historical Benders in several ways; set in contemporary Hibbing, Minnesota, it features a family of thrill-killers named Pa, Missy, Lee, and Jared Bender, whose downfall ultimately comes from a sheriff looking for her missing brother.
- Lonesome Dove: The Outlaw Years Season 2 Episode 4 (1995) titled "The Badlands" (www.imdb.com)
- Mysteries at the Museum Season 2 episode "Hitchcock's Birds, Hope Diamond, Phineas Gang" (2012) discusses the story of the Benders.
- ID documentary series Evil Kin Season 2, Episode 2 (2014) concerns the Benders; historians, authors, and the director of the Cherryvale Historical Museum are interviewed.
- The Librarians Episode 8 (2014), "And the Heart of Darkness" portrays the Benders as serial murderers who escaped justice by hiding in the magical House of Refuge. Katie (Lea Zawada), portrayed as a teenager rather than a young adult, eventually banished her own family and took possession of the house, using it to remain immortal as she tricked and murdered anyone seeking refuge. She was defeated by the Librarians during a mission in Slovakia and turned into dust by the house's caretaker spirit, who had come to recognize her as an evil influence.
- Amphibia Episode 15a (2019), "A Night At The Inn". This episode is based on the Bloody Benders, in this episode Anne Boonchuy and the Plantars stay in the Dandy Lion Inn owned by a Bullfrog Family. Only to realize they trap passengers at the inn.

=== Other ===
- The Bender family is mentioned in episode 94 of the podcast My Favorite Murder. Karen Kilgariff discusses the case and theories about the Benders.
- The Aberdeen Pig Farm stranger mission in the video game Red Dead Redemption 2 is loosely inspired by the Bender family.

== See also ==
- List of fugitives from justice who disappeared
- List of serial killers in the United States
- The Kelly Family (serial killers)
