= List of botanical gardens and arboretums in Kansas =

This list of botanical gardens and arboretums in Kansas is intended to include all significant botanical gardens and arboretums in the U.S. state of Kansas

Name	Image	Affiliation	City
Bartlett Arboretum			Belle Plaine
Botanica, The Wichita Gardens			Wichita
Dyck Arboretum of the Plains			Hesston
International Forest of Friendship			Atchison
Kansas Landscape Arboretum			Wakefield
Kansas State University Gardens		Kansas State University	Manhattan
Overland Park Arboretum and Botanical Gardens		Overland Park, Kansas	Overland Park
Parsons Arboretum			Parsons
Reinisch Rose Garden and Doran Rock Garden			Topeka
Sedgwick County Extension Arboretum			Sedgwick County
Ward-Meade Park Botanical Gardens			Topeka
University of Kansas Medical Center Botanic Gardens		University of Kansas Medical Center	Kansas City

== See also ==
- List of botanical gardens and arboretums in the United States
