= Maria Carmen Velásquez =

- Born: Maria Carmen Juárez; 1921; Parsons, Kansas, US
- Died: 1985 (aged 63–64)
- Known for: farmworker rights activism

Maria Carmen Velásquez (born Maria Carmen Juárez; 1921 — 1985) was an American migrant worker activist based out of Marion, Grant County, Indiana. Born in Parsons, Kansas, she is known for work supporting migrants and farm laborers in Indiana and across the US. She initially began her farm worker advocacy work in Marion, Indiana with St. Paul's Catholic Church and the Third Order of St. Francis priests. In 1965 the Associated Migrant Opportunities Services, Inc. (AMOS) was formed through grants from the Office of Economic Opportunity, part of President Johnson’s War on Poverty initiative, and was incorporated by the Indiana Council of Churches, the Roman Catholic Archdioceses of Indianapolis, Lafayette, Gary, and Ft. Wayne South Bend. Velásquez served as the director of the AMOS Sub-East Office.

== Life ==
Maria Carmen Velásquez was born Maria Carmen Juárez in Parsons, Kansas, in 1921. She grew up in Chicago.

Maria Carmen married Albert Velasquez in 1941 and in 1947 they moved to Fairmount, Indiana. Her husband Albert was a POW in France during WWII. She visited migrant camps in the Grant County, Indiana, area. She helped found the Associated Migrant Opportunity Services, Inc. in 1965. AMOS had offices across Indiana. Maria Carmen served as the director of the AMOS Sub-East Office.

In 2021, a black and white mural of Velásquez’s face was painted on an exterior wall of the Grant County Rescue Mission, part of a civic project to maintain the legacy of important local women.
