= Eugene Maxwell Frank =

Eugene Maxwell Frank (December 11, 1907 – October 13, 2009) was an American bishop of the Methodist and United Methodist Churches, elected in 1956. He was notable for his passion for racial equality in the Church and beyond. He also distinguished himself as a pastor, as both the youngest Methodist bishop and as the most senior United Methodist bishop, and as the one person more than any other responsible for the establishment of the Saint Paul School of Theology in Kansas City, MO.

== Early ministry, education and ordination ==
Born December 11, 1907, in Cherryvale, Kansas, Frank earned a bachelor's degree from Kansas State Teachers College of Pittsburg in 1930. He earned his Bachelor of Divinity degree in 1932 from the Garrett Bible Institute, Evanston, Illinois. He was ordained a deacon in the Methodist Episcopal Church in 1932, and an elder in 1933.

As a pastor, Frank served congregations throughout eastern Kansas. He served the First Methodist Church of Topeka for the eight years previous to his episcopal election. While at Topeka, his sermons were broadcast each Sunday and he wrote a weekly column for the Topeka Daily Capital newspaper. He was also a featured preacher on the nationally broadcast, Peabody Award winning The Protestant Hour radio program.

== Saint Paul School of Theology ==
As a delegate to the 1956 General Conference of the Methodist Church, Frank led efforts to gain approval to establish a new seminary in Kansas City. Due to a shortage of Methodist clergy in the Midwest and Plains states, this location was selected. When classes began in 1959, Frank was chair of the School's Board of Trustees, continuing in that role until 1972. Former St. Paul President, the Rev. Lovett H. Weems, Jr., said "More than any one person, Bishop Frank is responsible for both the establishment of Saint Paul and setting its direction as a place for all God's people to prepare to lead." Frank was still listed as a trustee of the school at the time of his death.

== Episcopal election and ministry ==
The Frank was elected to the episcopacy at the 1956 General Conference of the Methodist Church. He was at the time the youngest bishop in the denomination. Following the death of Bishop Ralph Edward Dodge in 2008, Frank became the oldest bishop in the United Methodist Church. Frank was also the last Bishop to die of those elected in 1956 or before.

Upon his election, Frank served as Resident Bishop of the Missouri episcopal area (1956–72) and of the Arkansas Area from 1972 until his retirement in 1976. Following retirement, he spent three years on the faculty of the Candler School of Theology at Emory University in Atlanta, Georgia. In 1980 he returned to Missouri to serve as bishop-in-residence at the Central United Methodist Church (until 1988). Frank also held the distinction of the first President of the Council of Bishops of the United Methodist Church.

Frank served 12 years on the Executive Committee of the World Methodist Council. He led the Commission on Public Relations and Methodist Information (a predecessor of the present United Methodist Communications). He also served on the General Board of Education and the General Committee on Family Life.

== Racial equality ==
Frank was renowned for his passion for racial equality. During his tenure as bishop in Missouri, he oversaw the merger of the former African-American Southwest Missouri Annual Conference with the two predominantly white annual (regional) conferences in the State. He also witnessed the dissolution of the former African-American Central Jurisdiction, which accompanied the 1968 uniting of the Evangelical United Brethren and Methodist Churches. He saw this as evidence of a new Church that was forming. Emphases on race relations, increasing ministry in urban settings, and youth ministry, he said, indicated the new church had turned to encounter the realities of her mission.

His family recalled at his Memorial Service how hard Frank worked for racial justice. He formed the Metropolitan Planning Commission in Kansas City to address racial equality, human rights and needs. As a result, an urban ministry program was developed that crossed all racial lines.

Indeed, even late in retirement, Frank continued to speak on social issues. In November 2005, for example, he was among 96 U.M. Bishops who signed "A Call to Repentance and Peace with Justice" opposing the war in Iraq. In his final column in the Missouri Methodist newspaper (June 1972), he wrote, "War will never again be a way to settle arguments between nations."

Retired Bishop Fritz Mutti described Frank as "always unassuming, displaying great humility... He always worked to 'hold the church together.' I value his sense that, as he would put it, 'effective leadership came from the way you related.'"

== Death and funeral ==
Frank died October 13, 2009, at the Kingswood Manor in Kansas City, Missouri. He was 101 years old. He was survived by his daughters and sons-in-law Wilmagene and Lewis Noonan of Leawood, Kansas, and Susan and Mark Parsons of Ashbourne, Derbyshire in the U.K.; by a daughter, Gretchen Frank Beal of Knoxville, Tennessee, and son and daughter-in-law, Thomas E. Frank and Gail O'Day of Atlanta. Seven grandchildren and 14 great-grandchildren also survived him.

A memorial service was held at 11:00 a.m. on October 17, 2009, at the Central United Methodist Church of Kansas City. A private burial was held October 16 in Pittsburg, Kansas. In lieu of flowers, the family requested memorial contributions be made to the Eugene and Wilma Frank Scholarship Funds at either Saint Paul School of Theology or Candler School of Theology.

== See also ==
- List of bishops of the United Methodist Church
