= The Kelly Family (serial killers) =

American serial killers

- Born: Pennsylvania, United States
- Died: January 4, 1888; South Texas, United States
- Cause of death: Bill, Kit, and William were hanged by a posse. Kate broke her neck after falling off a horse.
- Other names: "The Kelly Friends" "The Kelly Gang"
- Convictions: Murder, Manslaughter, assault
- Penalty: None, died before they could be convicted

Details
- Victims: 11
- Span of crimes: August – December 1887
- Country: United States
- States: Oklahoma Panhandle ("No Man's Land"), later part of Oklahoma
- Date apprehended: January 4, 1888

The Kelly Family was an American family of serial killers who operated between August and December 1887 near a town called Oak City, just south of the Kansas state border in "No Man's Land", now the Oklahoma Panhandle. The family consisted of William Kelly (55); his wife Kate; his son Bill, also called 'Billy' (20) and daughter, Kit (18). Originally from Pennsylvania, the family is believed to have murdered 11 wealthy travelers, akin to the Bloody Benders a decade earlier.

Vigilantes hunted down and killed the fleeing family in order to make an example of them. William confessed to all of the family's crimes before being hanged from a tree.

== Move to Kansas ==
According to 55-year-old William Kelly's confession, he and his family moved from the Pennsylvania mountains to Kansas in 1869. They moved around to different places along the southern border until eventually settling in No Man's Land, around 25 miles from Beaver, Oklahoma. Initially dealing with cattle, the Kellys soon opened a tavern, where they housed fellow cattlers and travelers. Although illiterate, they were regarded as an ordinary working family, with nobody harboring any suspicion towards them.

== Discovery of crimes ==
In the span of a few months, a number of people had disappeared mysteriously along the road leading to the Kelly tavern. Despite this, nobody suspected the family of doing anything until around December 1887, when the occupants suddenly left the house without notifying anybody. A short while after, a traveller from St. Louis named S. T. Gregg, who had visited the tavern before, decided to stop by and check the house.

Upon entry, a foul stench overtook him, coming from a hidden cellar underneath the house. The bodies of three men, already in an advanced state of decomposition, were discovered, as well as a trap door under the tavern's floor. Gregg immediately notified authorities of the matter. Shortly after, search parties came into the house, one of them led by a cowboy called "Texy".

While digging around the barn in search of any other corpses, the men's attention was drawn to some loosened dirt to the left of the barn door. When dug up, a body with a broken skull was discovered, evidently murdered with an axe. Further digging revealed seven other bodies, two of them women. Although the majority of the victims were decomposed beyond recognition, three were identified from their clothing: Jim Coven, a cattleman whose business covered that area and Texas; J. T. Taylor, a missing wealthy drummer (salesman) from Chicago; and a Texas merchant named Johnson. An old rusty axe with human flesh on its blade, presumed to be the murder weapon, was also located.

== Search, capture and execution ==
Soon after the discoveries, information from Beaver came that all four of the Kelly Family had passed through town a few days ago, en route to New Mexico. It was noted that they were driving a span of several horses, and appeared to have a lot of money on them. A posse of 20 men was quickly organized, and the family's trail led to Palo Duro Creek, from where it appeared that their route had changed towards Wheeler, Texas. After a while, the posse caught up with them, and engaged in a two-hour long chase. Eventually, Kate Kelly's horse tripped and Kate fell to the ground, breaking her neck in the process. She was left behind, and half an hour later, the vigilantes caught up with Bill and Kit, but William managed to escape.

Upon capture, Kit began pleading for mercy, only to be told off by her brother for being as complicit in the murders as he was. Two ropes were procured and the duo were prepared to be hanged on a nearby tree. Moments before they were hanged, Kit whispered to Bill if she should tell them everything, only for her brother to curse at the posse and encourage them to 'find out for themselves'. Subsequently, both were left hanging on the tree.

The vigilantes then chased after William, whose horse left behind a recognizable trail because it was shod only in the front. They eventually caught up with him, and after firing two shots at the fugitive, he gave up, stopped and dismounted from his horse. The group quickly surrounded him, and the leader allowed the criminal to confess all of his sins. William proceeded to explain their family history, but claimed to have moved towards Texas because of the crimes in the area, denying taking part in the killings.

The posse being dissatisfied, he was quickly hanged for a bit before being lowered down and asked to confess. Finally he did, telling that all of the family members had taken part, where the money was stored, and that they had killed nine men and two women. The elder Kelly was then stripped of all his belongings, including a gold watch belonging to J. T. Taylor, and was left to hang.

== Modus operandi ==
When a traveller would come by at the Kellys' tavern, they would first ascertain if they were wealthy. If confirmed, either William or Bill, or sometimes Kit, would engage the client in conversation, while Kate prepared the meal. The victim's chair would always be positioned at the trap door, and when a signal was given, the door would spring open, with the victim either dying from the fall or being disposed of later on with the axe.

== Connection to the Benders ==
According to a news report from contemporary media, an unnamed man from Kansas City, who had investigated the notorious Bender Family's house and the rumors of their deaths numerous times, claimed that the Kellys were in fact the Benders. The man further elaborated that all the stories of the latter's capture were made up, supposedly by a group of confederates, who had also helped the Benders dispose of the murdered victims' horses and wagons. He argued that both families' modus operandi, family unit numbers and other evidences proved that they were one and the same.

== See also ==
- List of serial killers in the United States
