= Big Hill Lake =

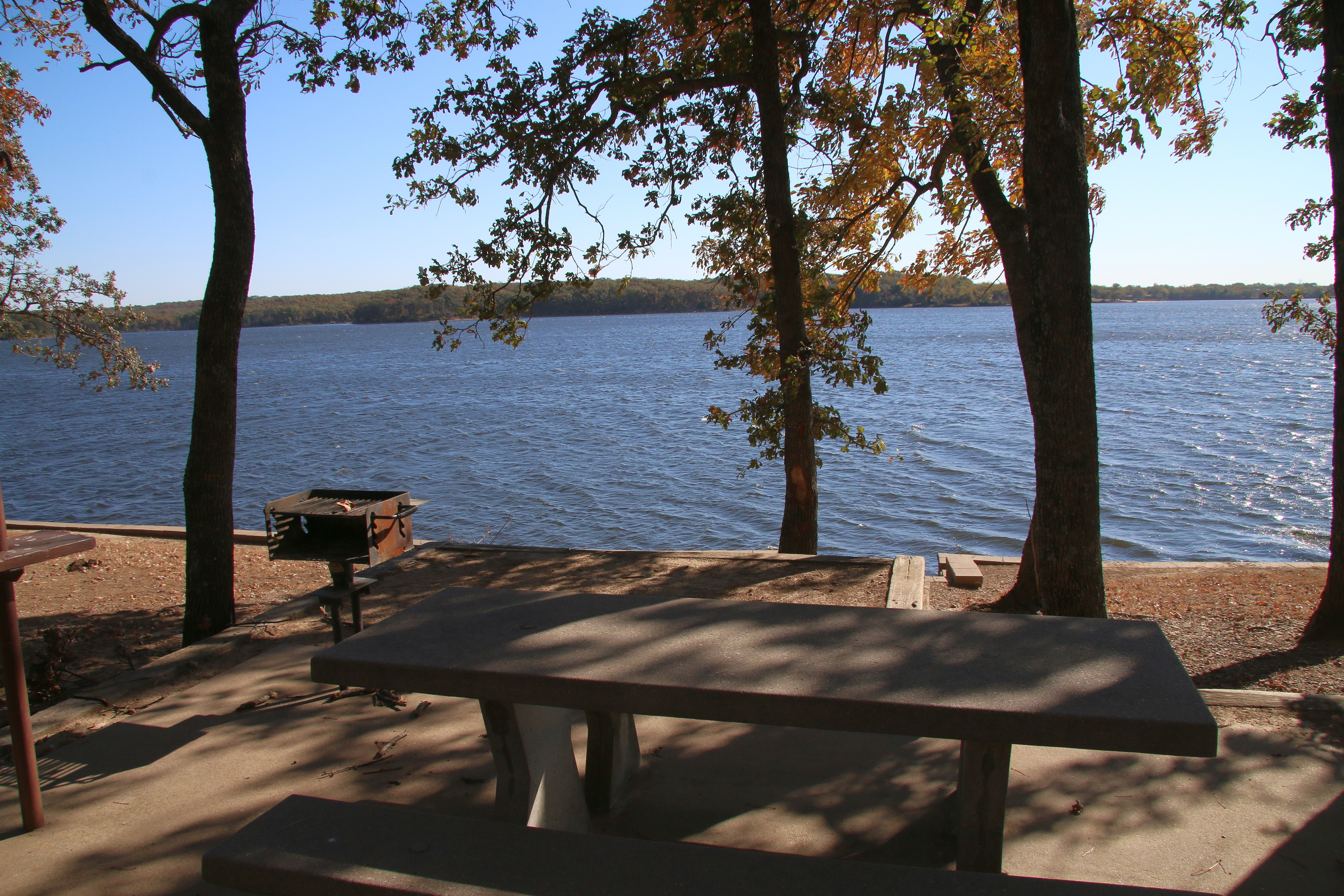

- Location within Kansas Location within the United States

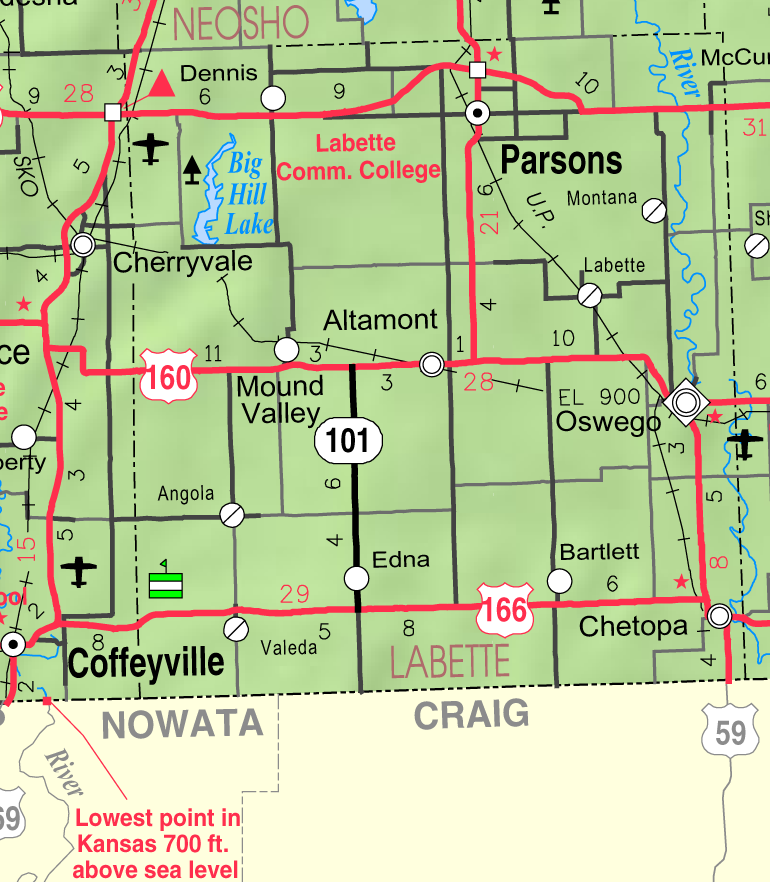
- KDOT map of Labette County (legend)
- Location: Labette County, Kansas
- Coordinates: 37°17′31″N 95°27′31″W
- Type: Reservoir
- Primary inflows: Big Hill Creek
- Primary outflows: Big Hill Creek
- Basin countries: United States
- Managing agency: U.S. Army Corps of Engineers
- Surface area: 1,240 acres (500 ha)
- Surface elevation: 856 ft (261 m)
- Settlements: Cherryvale, Parsons, Mound Valley, Dennis

Big Hill Lake is a body of water in Labette County, Kansas, United States. It is located 3.5 miles (5.6 km) east of Cherryvale and 9.5 miles (15.3 km) southwest of Parsons. The reservoir holds 1,240 acres (5.0 km^{2}) of water, with 367 acres (1.49 km^{2}) available for public use. Fishing, picnicking, boating, and a sandy beach swimming area are popular activities. The lake is operated by the U.S. Army Corps of Engineers.

Facilities available at Big Hill Lake include designated campsites both with and without utilities, group picnic and camping areas, primitive camping areas, potable water, sanitary facilities, boat launching ramps, playgrounds, a ball field and a swimming beach with a change house. Camping fees are collected at all of the park areas, and a day use fee is collected for the beach and boat ramps.

Other features include the Big Hill Lake Horse Trail, which is 17 miles (27 km) long and winds along a scenic hardwood ridge. It also offers tethering areas and three parking areas which are equipped with limited facilities and may be used for overnight camping by trail riders. Various species of wildlife can be seen throughout the hike of the trail.

Due to stocking, fish shelters and leaving large areas of timber and other vegetation standing, Big Hill Lake has developed into one of the most productive and popular fishing spots in the area. Principal species of sport fish include large mouth bass, crappie, channel and flathead catfish, bluegill, walleye and small mouth bass.

With Big Hill Lake being one of the clearest lakes in Kansas, it has become a popular recreational destination in the region.

== See also ==
- List of Kansas state parks
- List of lakes, reservoirs, and dams in Kansas
- List of rivers of Kansas
