= Parsons State Hospital =

Major teaching hospital in USA State of Kansas

Coordinates: 37°21′3″N 95°16′47″W

Geography
- Location: Parsons, Kansas, United States

Organization
- Type: Teaching

History
- Opened: 1903

Links
- Lists: Hospitals in Kansas

Parsons State Hospital (Formerly Parsons State Hospital & Training Center), a major facility occupying 43 buildings, is also known by its shorter name, Parsons State Hospital It is a teaching hospital located in Parsons, Kansas, and is one of four Kansas state hospitals.

== Overview ==
The Kansas Department for Aging and Disability Services (KDADS) has advisory and regulatory oversight of services provided by the hospital to those with intellectual and developmental disabilities. It is one of the state's two locations with these services in a residential setting.

== History ==
Parsons "opened in 1903 as a State Hospital for Epileptics." It was given its current names in 1957. Parsons "is one of two facilities in the state that serve Kansans with intellectual disabilities.

Included in its 163 acres is a cemetery.

A collection of Governor Arthur Capper's correspondences includes two letters of complaint from inmates at Parsons State Hospital.

== Controversy ==
Terms such as de-institutionalize, phased reduction, consolidation and closure regarding "Kansans whose disabilities are at such an extreme level that they need" special care were part of discussions in 1998 and 2010. Economic factors such as more than 1,000 jobs on the one hand, and millions of dollars on the other, were involved. The Associated Press described this as a national trend and cited a study which disclosed that "eight states no longer run such institutions for the mentally disabled."

The governor also mentioned "more restricted admission standards." The legislature disagreed.

== See also ==
- Booth Memorial Hospital
