= Parsons USD 503 =

Public school district in Parsons, Kansas

Address
- 2900 Southern Ave. Parsons, Kansas, 67357; United States
- Coordinates: 37.32517°N 95.28182°W

District information
- Type: Public
- Grades: K to 12
- Schools: 5

Other information
- Website: usd503.org

Parsons USD 503 is a public unified school district headquartered in Parsons, Kansas, United States. The district includes the community of Parsons and nearby rural areas.

== Schools ==
The school district operates the following schools:

- Parsons High School
- Parsons Middle School
- Garfield Elementary School
- Guthridge Elementary School
- Lincoln Elementary School

== See also ==
- Kansas State Department of Education
- Kansas State High School Activities Association
- List of high schools in Kansas
- List of unified school districts in Kansas
