= Parsons Senior High School =

- "Victor The Viking"

Location
- 3030 Morton Avenue; Parsons, Kansas 67357; United States; 37.332905°N 95.282427°W

Information
- School type: Public, High school
- School board: Board website
- School district: Parsons USD 503
- Superintendent: Lori Ray
- CEEB code: 172343
- Principal: Eric Swanson
- Teaching staff: 28.90 (FTE)
- Grades: 9 to 12
- Gender: coed
- Enrollment: 416 (2023–2024)
- Student to teacher ratio: 14.39
- Schedule: 7:55am to 3:15pm
- Campus type: Urban
- Colors: Blue; Gold
- Athletics conference: Southeast Kansas League
- Mascot: Viking
- Rival: Labette County High School
- Website: School website

Parsons Senior High School is a public secondary school in Parsons, Kansas, United States. It is operated by Parsons USD 503 school district, and serves students of grades 9 to 12. It is the sole high school in the school district. The school colors are blue and gold and the school mascot is "Victor the Viking". It is a member of the Kansas State High School Activities Association and offers a variety of sports programs. Activities teams compete in the 4A division, except football which competes in the 3A division. Extracurricular activities are also offered in the form of performing arts, school publications, and clubs.

== History ==
In 1882, some of the first high school classes offered at Parsons were held at McKinley School. The first Parsons High School building was built in 1893 and cost $30,000. It was located on the southwest corner of Twenty-sixth and Main Streets. The building served the city in its original capacity for just over 30 years. When the new high school / junior college was built on Main Street in the late 1920s, the old high school became West Junior High School. By the 1950s, voters agreed that a new secondary school should begin construction. In the late 50s, the current Parsons High School building was completed. In 2009, a major renovation project was undertaken for Parsons High School and was completely finished before the start of the fall semester. It gave Parsons High School the modern look that can be observed today.

== Academics ==
Parsons Senior High School has a 93% graduation rate. In addition to this, 77% of graduates continue to post-secondary education. PHS offers general education classes as well as CTE programs such as Automotive Technology, Graphic Design, Health Science, Welding and more.

== Extracurricular activities ==
=== Debate and Forensics ===
The Parsons High School debate and forensics program is historically recognized as one of the most elite and dominant public school speech and debate programs in both Kansas and the United States, having won several individual and team state championships in both debate and forensics. Parsons was the first school to win the 4-speaker and 2-speaker state debate championships in the same year, doing so in 1993, the first year that the 2-speaker championships existed. In 1990, PHS became the only school ever to place two students (Ajit Pai and Michael Monninger) in the top four National Forensic League (NFL) point leaders in the same year. For several years, PHS also led the nation in most NFL All-Americans produced, and had more students amongst the all-time NFL point leaders than any other school from Kansas. Between 1985 and 2019 Parsons has been represented at the National Speech and Debate Tournament 31 out of those 34 years, and was recognized as a 30-year milestone school at the 2018 tournament. In 2012, Steven Wood, the former debate and forensics coach at Parsons High School was inducted into the National Forensic League Hall of Fame, which is the highest honor for a high school speech and debate coach. While Mark Harris was the coach from 1985 to 1997 the program was particularly successful, winning state championships in 1991, 1993, 1994 and 1995.

=== Athletics ===
The Vikings compete in the Southeast Kansas League and are classified as a 4A school. Throughout its history, Parsons has won several state championships in various sports.

==== State championships ====
State Championships
Season	Sport	Number of Championships	Year
Fall	Tennis, Girls	5	1994, 1995, 1998, 1999, 2005
Winter	Basketball, Boys	3	1973, 1975, 1987
Spring	Tennis, Boys	4	1999, 2000, 2001, 2002, 2025
Spring	Golf, Boys	5	1970, 1971 (2-Man), 1994, 1995, 2000
Spring	Track & Field, Boys	1	1991
Total		18	

Parsons Senior High School offers the following sports:

==== Fall ====
- Football
- Volleyball
- Boys Cross-Country
- Girls Cross-Country
- Girls Golf
- Girls Tennis
- Cheerleading
- Dance Squad
- Marching Band

==== Winter ====
- Boys Basketball
- Girls Basketball
- Boys Swimming/Diving
- Wrestling
- Winter Percussion

==== Spring ====
- Baseball
- Boys Golf
- Boys Tennis
- Girls Soccer
- Girls Swimming/Diving
- Softball
- Boys Track and Field
- Girls Track and Field

== Notable alumni ==
- Gilbert Baker, civil rights activist and creator of the pride flag
- William Coleman, founder of the Coleman Company, and mayor of Wichita, Kansas
- Pintip Dunn, author of young adult fiction
- Derrel Gofourth, NFL offensive lineman for the Green Bay Packers and San Diego Chargers
- George Harvey, professional football player
- Shaun Hill, NFL quarterback for the San Francisco 49ers, Minnesota Vikings, Los Angeles Rams, and Detroit Lions
- Ajit Pai, former FCC chairman
- Nell Reed, American fashion designer and businesswoman.

== See also ==
- List of high schools in Kansas
- List of unified school districts in Kansas
