= Parsons Katy Hospital =

- U.S. National Register of Historic Places
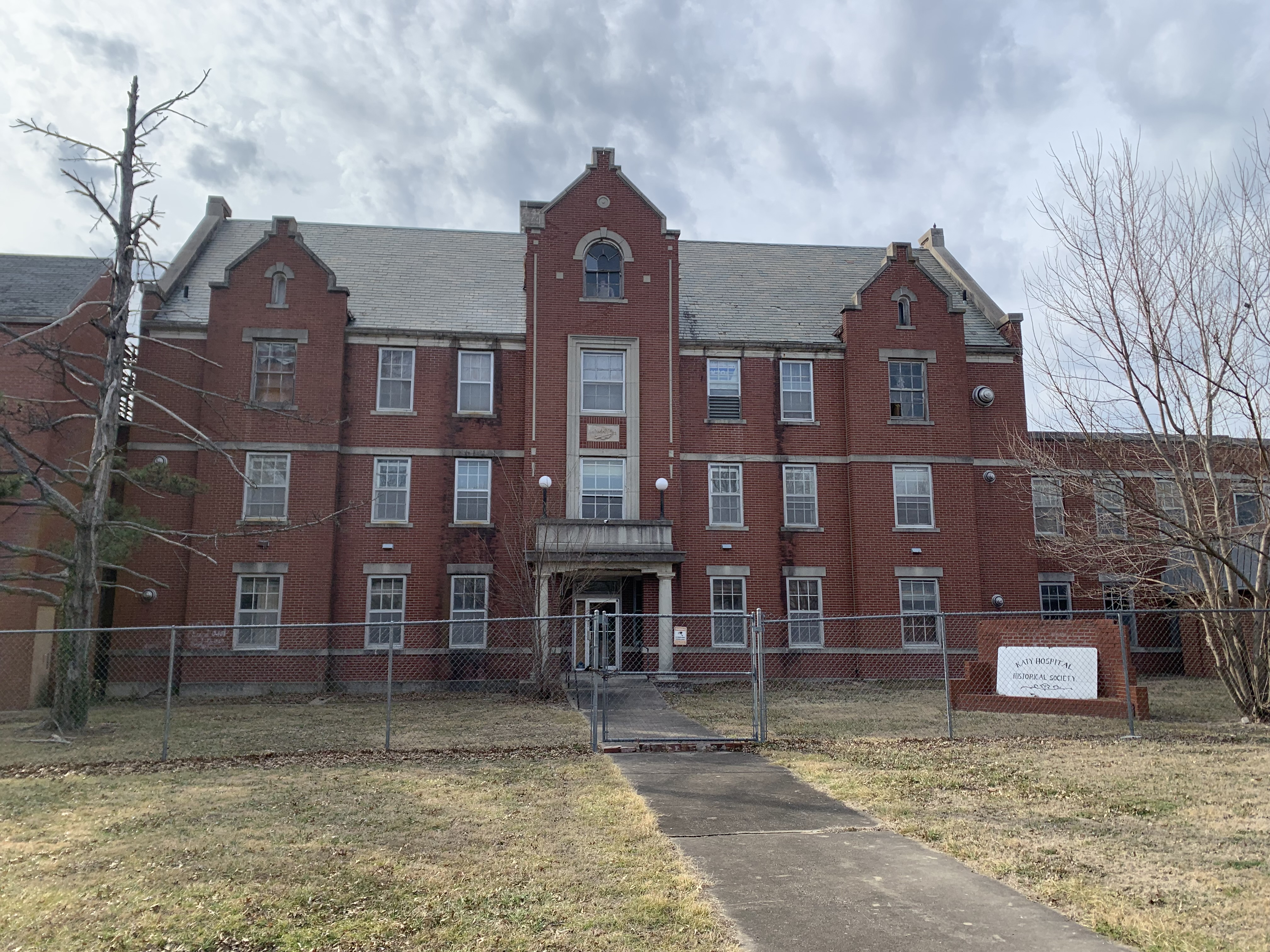
- Parsons Katy Hospital in 2026

- Location within Kansas Location within the United States
- Location: 400 Katy Ave., Parsons, Kansas
- Coordinates: 37°20′37″N 95°16′59″W
- Area: 3 acres (1.2 ha)
- Built: 1921–1922
- Built by: H. Barbour
- Architect: Robertson and Griesenbeck
- Architectural style: Colonial Revival
- NRHP reference No.: 07001482
- Added to NRHP: January 31, 2008

The Parsons Katy Hospital, located at 400 Katy Ave. in Parsons, Kansas, was built during 1921–1922. It was listed on the National Register of Historic Places in 2008.

It was designed by Dallas, Texas architects Robertson and Griesenbeck. It was built at contract cost of $225,000 by H. Barbour.

It was deemed significant as "an example of a 1920s hospital. The building retains a high degree of integrity and interprets its unique role in the history of Parsons, Kansas."
