= Kansas Army Ammunition Plant =

Manufacturing facility in Kansas, U.S.

Coordinates: 37°17′07″N 95°10′44″W

The Kansas Army Ammunition Plant (Kansas AAP) was a 13,727-acre (55.55 km^{2}) government-owned, contractor-operated (GOCO) facility, established in 1942, located near Parsons, Kansas. The plant produced ammunition during World War II, the Korean War, and the Vietnam War. The plant was deactivated on March 4, 2009 as part of the Base Realignment and Closure, 2005.

The plant is currently owned and operated by Day and Zimmerman, Inc. and primarily produces mortar ammunition.

== Production ==
While in operation, the Kansas AAP produced a variety of ammunition, from basic artillery and mortar shells to sophisticated air dropped munitions with advanced guidance and control systems. Some examples of munitions produced include the Sensor Fuzed Weapon for the U.S. Air Force, M720 and M768 60 mm mortar shells for the U.S. Army and the M795 155 mm projectile for the U.S. Marine Corps.

On July 26, 1989, a BLU-97 cluster bomb being manufactured in Building 1113 killed two employees.

== Environmental impact ==
The United States Environmental Protection Agency (EPA) inspected the Kansas Army Ammunition Plant to determine if the site needed to be cleaned up via RCRA or CERCLA. On September 30, 2003 the EPA found that the contamination at the site was under control.
