= Katy Days Festival =

- Genre: Country, Bluegrass, Rock
- Dates: Memorial Day Weekend
- Locations: Parsons, Kansas, US
- Years active: 2001 - Present
- Founders: Mary Hughes
- Website: http://www.katydays.com

Katy Days Festival is a railroad themed festival held annually during the Memorial Day Weekend in Parsons, Kansas at Forest Park. It commemorates the arrival of the first Missouri–Kansas–Texas train.
