= William W. Cranston =

American soldier (1838–1907)

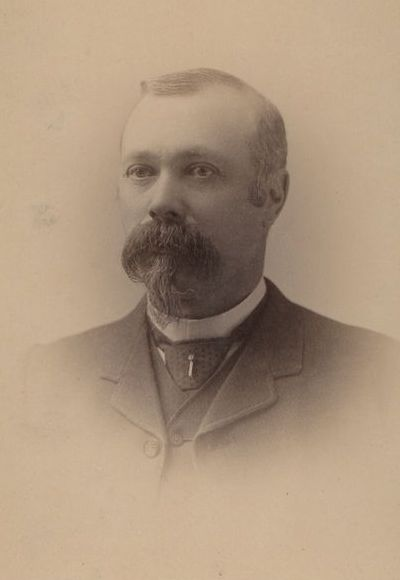
- Born: November 20, 1838; Woodstock, Ohio, US
- Died: December 7, 1907 (aged 69); Kansas, US
- Burial place: Oakwood Cemetery, Parsons, Kansas
- Military career
- Allegiance: United States of America
- Branch: United States Army
- Rank: Private
- Unit: 66th Ohio Volunteer Infantry Regiment - Company A
- Awards: Medal of Honor

Captain William Wallace Cranston (November 20, 1838 – December 7, 1907) was an American soldier who fought in the American Civil War. Cranston received the country's highest award for bravery during combat, the Medal of Honor, for his action during the Battle of Chancellorsville in Virginia on May 2, 1863. He was honored with the award on December 15, 1892.

== Biography ==
Cranston was born in Woodstock, Ohio, on November 20, 1838. He enlisted into the 66th Ohio Infantry. After the war, he moved to Kansas and was elected to the Kansas House of Representatives from the 28th District, serving from 1889 to 1891. He died on December 7, 1907, aged 69, and his remains are interred at Oakwood Cemetery, Parsons, Kansas.

== Medal of Honor citation ==
One of a party of 4 who voluntarily brought in a wounded Confederate officer from within the enemy's line in the face of a constant fire.

== See also ==
- List of American Civil War Medal of Honor recipients: A–F
- Battle of Vicksburg
- 66th Ohio Volunteer Infantry Regiment
