= Lake Parsons =

- Location within Kansas Location within the United States
- Location: Neosho County, Kansas
- Coordinates: 37°24′36″N 95°20′30″W
- Type: Reservoir
- Basin countries: United States
- Max. length: 2.26 mi (3.64 km)
- Max. width: 0.83 mi (1.34 km)
- Surface area: 980 acres (400 ha)
- Surface elevation: 925 ft (282 m)
- Islands: several islets

Lake Parsons is a lake in the state of Kansas. Located 3 miles (5 km) north on highway 59 and 3 miles (5 km) west on 20th road from the city of Parsons, Kansas, United States. The lake has a surface area of 980 acres (4.0 km^{2}) and there are about 1,000 acres (4 km^{2}) of public-use land owned by the city of Parsons surrounding the lake. Fishing, camping, picnicking, boating, and a gravel beach swimming area are popular activities.
