= Oakwood Cemetery (Parsons, Kansas) =

Cemetery in Labette County, Kansas

- U.S. National Register of Historic Places
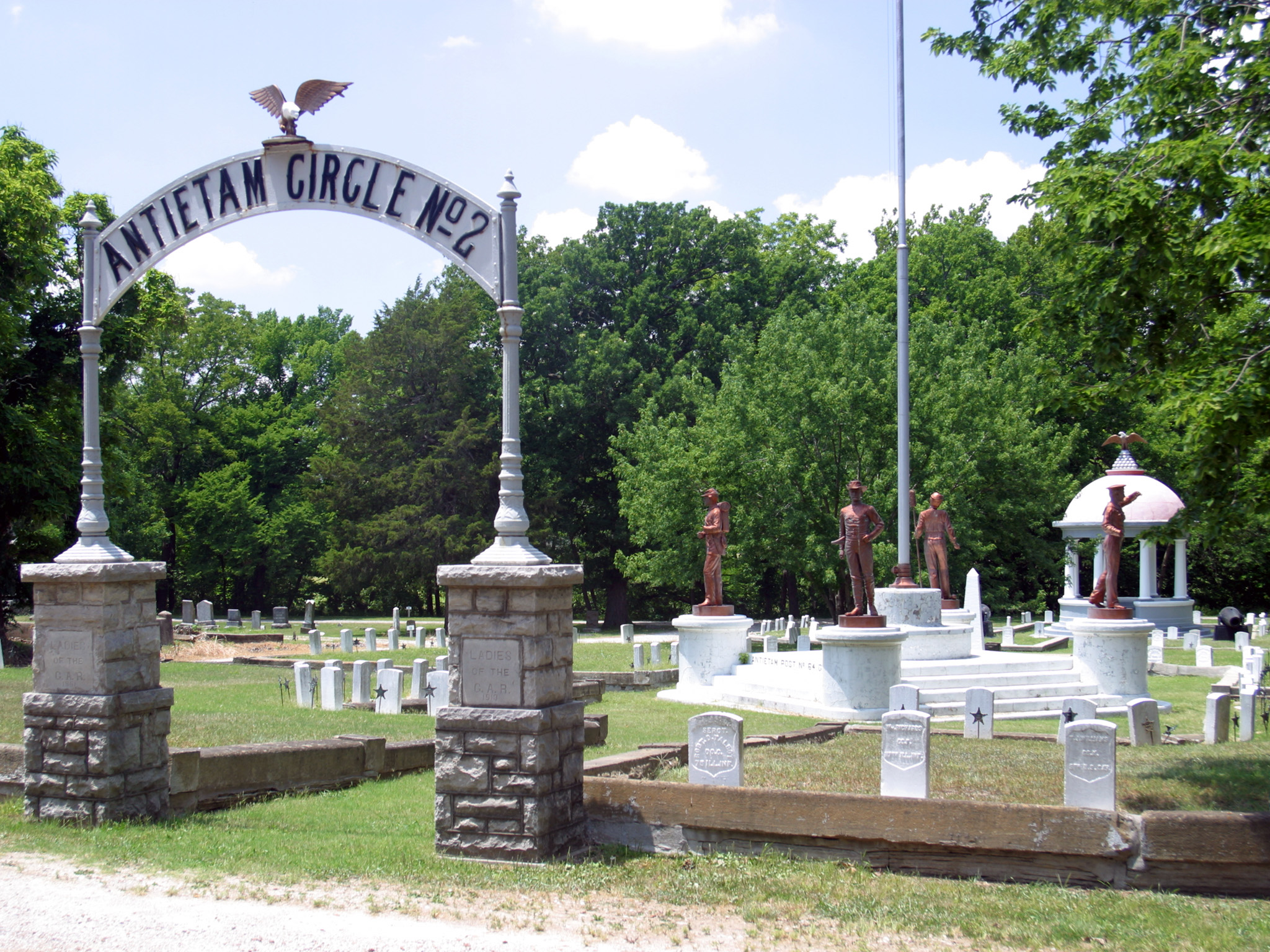
- Circle No. 2 in Oakwood Cemetery (2006)

- Location within Kansas Location within the United States
- Location: 200 S. Leawood, Parsons, Kansas
- Coordinates: 37.3358460°N 95.2385090°W
- Built: 1872
- NRHP reference No.: 100010344
- Added to NRHP: May 9, 2024

Oakwood Cemetery, located at 200 South Leawood, opened on June 1, 1872, as the city cemetery of Parsons, Kansas, United States. The cemetery is notable for two special sections called Antietam Circles, where local veterans of the American Civil War are buried. The two portions of the cemetery were separately purchased in 1886 and 1889 by a local chapter of a veteran's group, the Grand Army of the Republic, Antietam Post No. 64. This portion of the cemetery also contains a rotunda, two Columbiad Canons, an iron arch donated by the Daughters of the American Revolution in 1913, and Civil War memorial statues. The cemetery was listed on the National Register of Historic Places in 2024. ⠀ ⠀ ⠀

== Notable burials ==
Notable burials include:

- William W. Cranston (1838–1907), Civil War Medal of Honor recipient
- Clyde M. Reed (1871–1949), Governor of Kansas and US Senator
