= Carnegie Library (Parsons, Kansas) =

- U.S. National Register of Historic Places
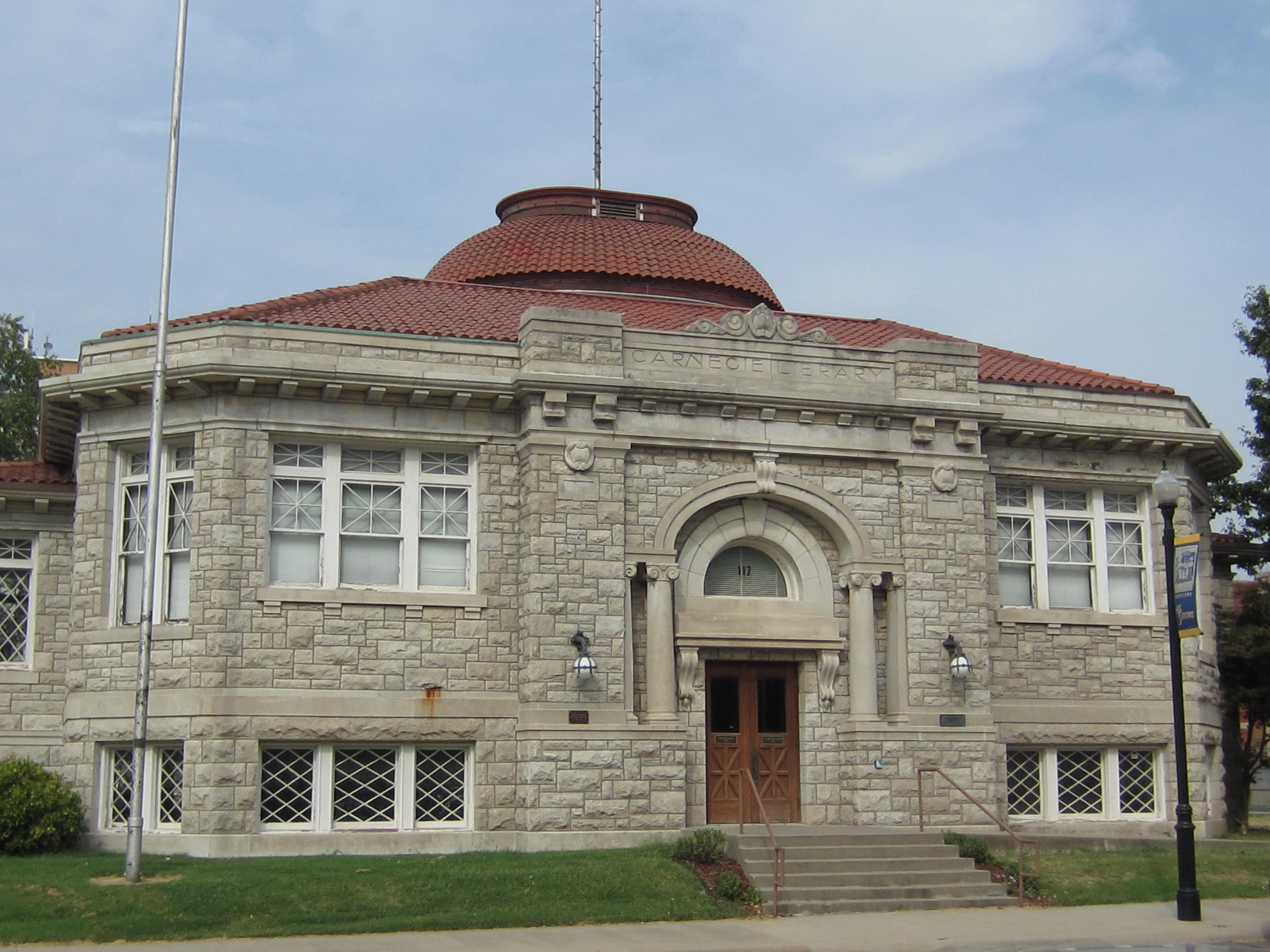
- Parsons Carnegie Arts Center (2013)

- Location within Kansas Location within the United States
- Location: 17th and Broadway, Parsons, Kansas
- Coordinates: 37°20′23″N 95°15′39″W
- Area: 1 acre (0.40 ha)
- Built: 1909
- Architect: F.E. Parker
- Architectural style: Beaus Arts
- NRHP reference No.: 76000824
- Added to NRHP: April 14, 1976

The Carnegie Library in Parsons, Kansas is a building from 1909. The Carnegie library was listed on the National Register of Historic Places in 1976.

The Parsons Public Library moved out to a larger facility in 1977.

The building is now home to the Carnegie Arts Center, which hosts art shows and community events.
