= Albert Frederick Mutti =

American bishop

Albert Frederick "Fritz" Mutti, III (born 13 February 1938) is a retired American bishop of the United Methodist Church, elected in 1992.

== Birth and family ==
Mutti was born in Hopkins, Missouri, the son of Albert Frederick Mutti, Jr. and Phyllis M. (Turner) Mutti. All his life he has been identified by the nickname, "Fritz." He married Etta Mae McClurg, also of Hopkins, Missouri (his high school sweetheart) 7 June 1959. They are the parents of three sons: Timothy Allen, John Frederick and Martin Kent. Both Tim and Fred died of A.I.D.S. They are also the grandparents of Siobhan M. Williams (daughter of John Frederick).

== Education ==
Fritz graduated from Hopkins High School. He then earned an A.B. from Central Methodist College in 1960, and an M.Div. degree from Garrett Theological Seminary in 1963. His D.Min. is from Saint Paul School of Theology (1975).

== Ordained ministry ==
Fritz was admitted on trial and ordained a Deacon in the former Missouri Annual Conference of The Methodist Church in 1961. He was admitted to Full Connection and ordained an Elder in the Missouri West Annual Conference in 1963. Both ordinations were accomplished by Bishop Eugene Frank.

Rev. Mutti served a variety of appointments as a Pastor, beginning as a Student Pastor in Missouri and Indiana. Following seminary graduation he was the Pastor of the Union Star-Star Chapel-Oak Grove circuit for two years. From there he moved to Savannah becoming the Founding Pastor of the Crossroads Ecumenical Cooperative Parish.

He was a member of the Missouri West Conference Staff for eight years, serving first as Director of Education and Camping, then as Conference Council Director. In 1982 Dr. Mutti was appointed Senior Pastor of the First U.M.C., Blue Springs, Missouri. He was then appointed Superintendent of the Central District in 1987, and of the Kansas City North District in 1989.

Throughout his career in ordained ministry he was elected a delegate to five Jurisdictional Conferences and four General Conferences of the U.M. Church. He led his conference's delegation in 1984, 1988 and 1992. He also served as a Director of the U.M. General Board of Discipleship (1980–88) and of the General Board of Global Ministries (1988–92).

== Episcopal ministry ==
Fritz Mutti was elected to the Episcopacy by the South Central Jurisdictional Conference of the U.M. Church in 1992. He was assigned to the Kansas episcopal area.

== See also ==
- List of bishops of the United Methodist Church
