= Nicholas Nicastro =

American novelist

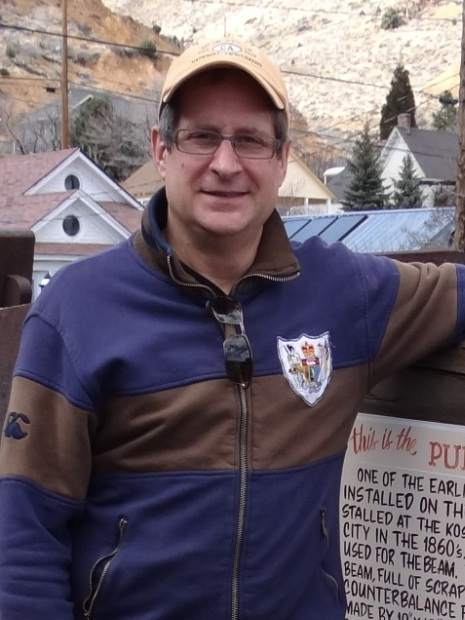
- Nicastro in 2012
- Born: 1963 (age 62–63); New York City, U.S.
- Education: Cornell University (BA, MA, PhD); New York University (MFA)
- Occupations: Writer; filmmaker; film critic
- Writing career
- Genres: Fiction; science

Nicholas Nicastro (born 1963) is an American fiction and science writer, filmmaker, and film critic. His 2008 biography of Eratosthenes attracted scholarly attention.

== Life and career ==
Born in Astoria, New York in 1963, he received a BA in English from Cornell University (1985), an MFA in filmmaking from New York University (1991), an M.A. in archaeology and a Ph.D. in psychology from Cornell (1996 and 2003). He has also worked as a film critic, a hospital orderly, a newspaper reporter, a library archivist, a college lecturer in anthropology and psychology, an animal behaviorist, and an advertising salesman. His Cornell dissertation research on how humans respond to the vocalizations of domestic cats got some attention from the news media, especially in publications aimed at "cat people".

Nicastro taught anthropology, psychology and writing at Cornell University and Hobart and William Smith Colleges. While active in research he published scholarly papers in Journal of Comparative Psychology, Evolutionary Anthropology, Behavioral & Brain Sciences, and American Journal of Archaeology. In 2005, he left academia to pursue writing full-time.

== Writings, reception, and awards ==
Nicastro's writings include short fiction, travel and science articles in such publications as The New York Times, The New York Observer, Film Comment, and the International Herald Tribune. In 1996, he wrote and directed the documentary video Science or Sacrilege: Native Americans, Archaeology & the Law, an examination of the conflict between scientists and native people for control of ancient remains. The video was honored by the American Anthropological Association, the Northwest Anthropological Conference, and the American Society for Ethnohistory, and is currently distributed by Berkeley Media LLC. It is often shown in college courses on this subject.

Nicastro wrote a regular film review column for The New York Observer from 1988 to 1990. From 2006 to 2015, Nicastro served as film critic for Tompkins Weekly, a newspaper serving the greater Ithaca, NY area.

Nicastro's ancient fiction, including Empire of Ashes and The Isle of Stone, is marked by a willingness to explore the dark underside of popular historical exploits. In Ashes, he presents the career of Alexander the Great from the angle of a skeptical Athenian soldier/historian who must debunk Alexander's official divinity to save himself from a charge of sacrilege. Classicist and expert in Alexander studies Prof. Jeanne Reames (Martin Professor of History, University of Nebraska) praised the book for "avoiding both apologetics and exaggerated sensationalism, making Empire of Ashes one of the best recent novels on the conqueror.” Empire of Ashes was included in a list of all-time recommended historical novels by the Archaeological Institute of America. In Isle of Stone, Nicastro presents a portrait of ancient Sparta during the Peloponnesian War that departs from what classical historian Paul Cartledge calls "the Spartan mirage". Instead, he reveals both the roots and the consequences of practices that, some say, made Sparta the Western world's prototype of a totalitarian society. Cartledge himself has praised Isle of Stone, observing "Nicastro's antiheroes of the isle of Sphacteria are the dark side of [Stephen] Pressfield's heroes in Gates of Fire: both demand and repay the attention of all lovers of expert historical fiction." His demythologizing approach has not been popular with all readers, however, drawing its share of negative reviews.

Nicastro published his first book-length work of non-fiction in 2008. Circumference: Eratosthenes and the Ancient Quest to Measure the Globe tells the story of the first man to measure the size of the Earth accurately. In a review, the Bryn Mawr Classical Review observed some scholarly inaccuracies, but noted overall "Given the paucity of material in English on Eratosthenes, anything is a welcome addition, but this book is much better than nothing. In its pages, historians of science will learn much about the ancient world, and historians of the ancient world will learn much about science." Circumference was subsequently cited as an "exemplar" text for 9th and 10th graders as part of the nationwide Common Core standards for English Language Arts.

In 2010, Nicastro struck off in a new fictional direction with the publication of The Passion of the Ripper, a psychological study of a prominent suspect in the Jack the Ripper murders of 1888. In its review, Ripperologist magazine, a leading publication in the study of the Ripper killings, called the novel "a strong new entry in the world of Ripper fiction".

== Novels ==
- Empire of Ashes: A Novel of Alexander The Great (December 7, 2004)
- The Isle of Stone: A Novel of Ancient Sparta (December 6, 2005) "A book for Spartophiles"
- Antigone's Wake: A Novel of Imperial Athens (April 7, 2007)
- The Passion of the Ripper (June 23, 2010)
- Hell's Half-Acre (November 10, 2015)
- Ella Maud (September 30, 2018)
- The River Through Rome (November 1, 2021)

=== The John Paul Jones Trilogy ===
1. The Eighteenth Captain (April 25, 1999)
2. Between Two Fires (November 1, 2002)
3. Book Three (TBA)

=== Non-fiction ===
- Circumference: Eratosthenes and the Ancient Quest to Measure the Globe (November 25, 2008)
- Archimedes: Fulcrum of Science (Spring, 2024)
