= Parsons Arboretum =

Arboretum in Parsons, Kansas, United States

Coordinates: 37.3297°N 95.2663°W

- Interactive map of Parsons Arboretum
- Website: Official website

The Parsons Arboretum (19 acres; 7.6 hectares) is an arboretum and garden located adjacent to the corner of 21st and Briggs Avenue in Glenwood Park, Parsons, Kansas, United States.

Built on the former location of the Parsons & Pacific Railroad yard, the Aboretum consists of a daylily bed, wetlands, gazebo, and a wildflower bed. Its history dates back to 1987 when the city established the Parsons Tree Advisory Board. When the Union Pacific Railroad deeded approximately 19 acres (77,000 m^{2}) of land to the City in 1991, the commission was able to organize an arboretum. The Arboretum was developed in 1992, and in 1993 the Parsons Arboretum Foundation, Inc. was established as a not-for-profit organization.
