= Cherryvale, Kansas =

City in Montgomery County, Kansas, U.S.

- City
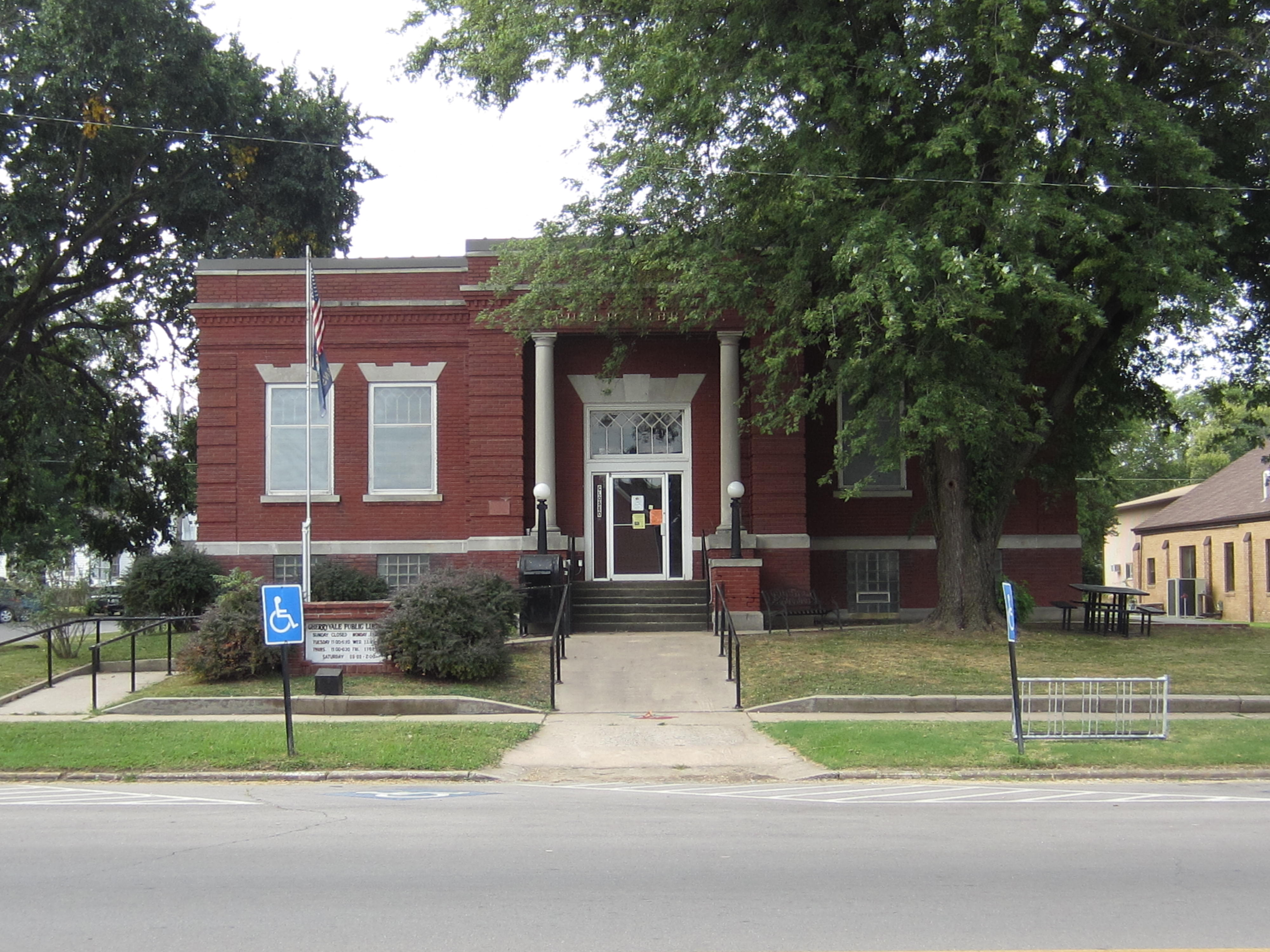
- Cherryvale Carnegie Library (2013)

- Location within Montgomery County and Kansas

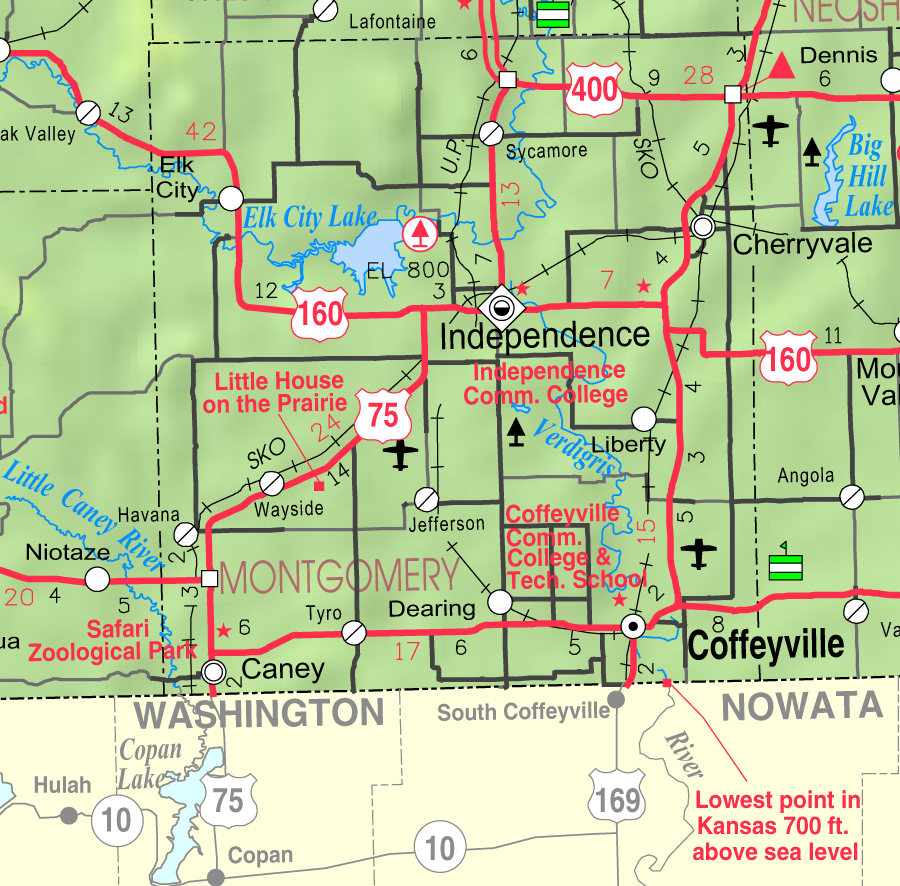
- KDOT map of Montgomery County (legend)
- Coordinates: 37°16′08″N 95°33′13″W
- Country: United States
- State: Kansas
- County: Montgomery
- Founded: 1871
- Platted: 1871
- Incorporated: 1880
- Named for: Cherry Creek valley

Area
  - Total: 2.03 sq mi (5.25 km^{2})
  - Land: 2.00 sq mi (5.19 km^{2})
  - Water: 0.023 sq mi (0.06 km^{2})
- Elevation: 830 ft (250 m)

Population (2020)
  - Total: 2,192
  - Density: 1,090/sq mi (422/km^{2})
- Time zone: UTC-6 (CST)
  - Summer (DST): UTC-5 (CDT)
- ZIP Code: 67335
- Area code: 620
- FIPS code: 20-12925
- GNIS ID: 485553
- Website: cherryvaleusa.com

Cherryvale is a city in Montgomery County, Kansas, United States. As of the 2020 census, the population of the city was 2,192.

== History ==
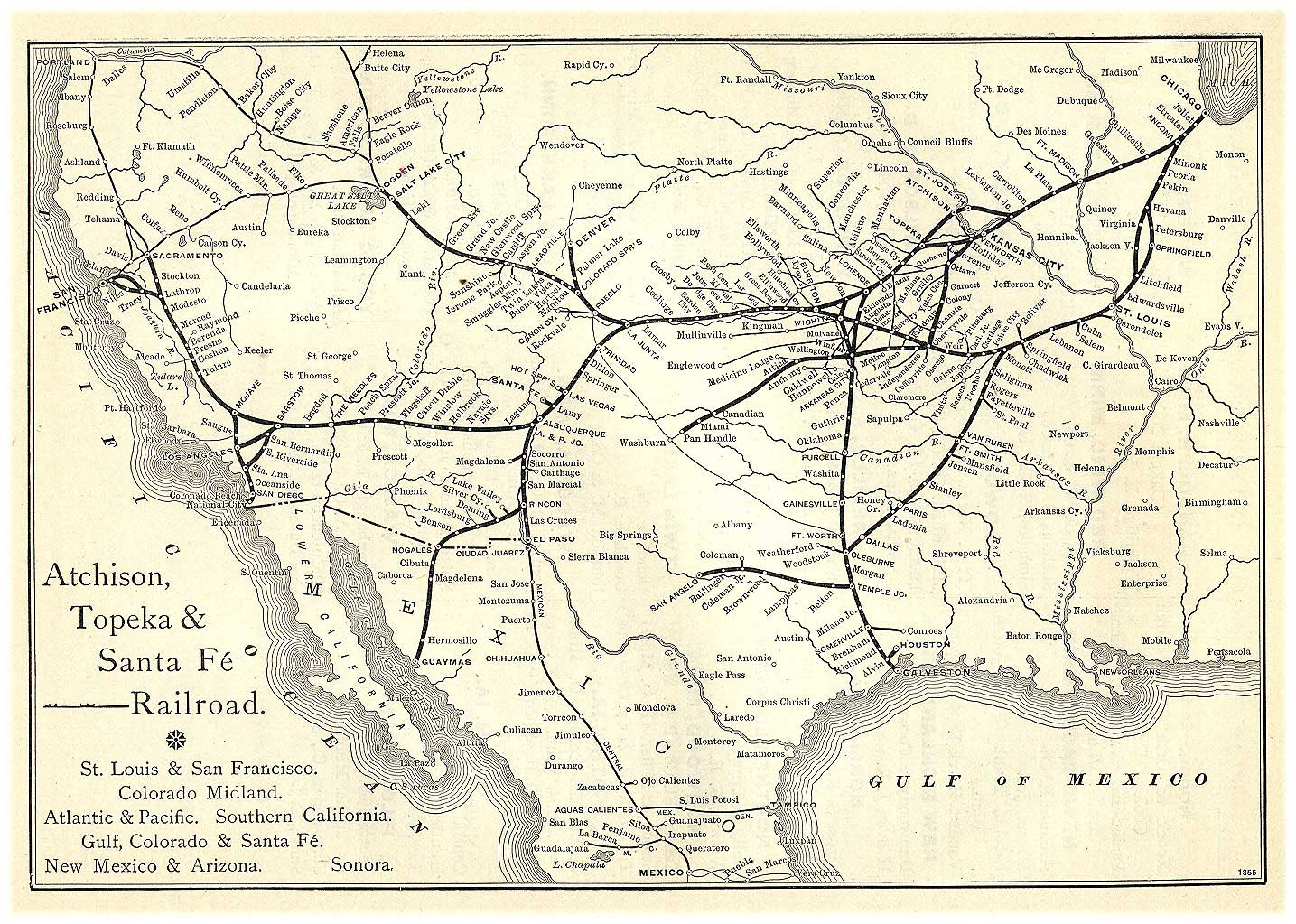
1891 Atchison, Topeka & Santa Fe Railway route map from Grain Dealers and Shippers Gazetteer.

Cherryvale was founded on the land of the Osage Indians who were pushed out by veterans of the American Civil War looking for land. The first white man to purchase property and settle here was Mr. Abe Eaton, who later sold it to the Kansas City, Lawrence & Southern Kansas Railroad which then became the Leavenworth, Lawrence & Galveston Railway, and eventually came under the control of the Atchison, Topeka and Santa Fe Railway, which operated the line for much of the 20th century. The town site was platted by the railroad in 1871. It was named Cherryvale from its position in the valley of Cherry Creek.

Between 1871 and 1873, at least eleven people vanished in the vicinity of an inn and general store operated by the Bender family about eight miles (13 km) northeast of Cherryvale. Following the disappearance of the Benders in 1873, it was discovered that they had apparently murdered a number of travellers. Between eight and eleven bodies were discovered buried on the premises. Governor Thomas A. Osborn offered a reward of $2,000 for the apprehension of the Benders, but they were never found.

The main part of the town was destroyed by fire in 1873, but was soon rebuilt, and in 1880 Cherryvale became a city of the third and afterwards of the second class. Natural gas, which is used as a factory fuel and for street and domestic lighting, was found here in 1889, and oil several years later.

The city is currently the headquarters for the South Kansas and Oklahoma Railroad, a shortline that runs 511 miles of track in Kansas and Oklahoma. The railroad, owned by WATCO, painted locomotive EMD SD40-2 number 4158, in the high school's colors of blue and white in 2011, and the unit is stationed at the intermodal switchyard, completed 2013, north of Cherryvale.

== Geography ==
According to the United States Census Bureau, the city has a total area of 1.92 square miles (4.97 km^{2}), of which 1.90 square miles (4.92 km^{2}) is land and 0.02 square miles (0.05 km^{2}) is water. Is self-described as the "Gateway to Big Hill Lake."

=== Climate ===
According to the Köppen Climate Classification system, Cherryvale has a humid subtropical climate, abbreviated "Cfa" on climate maps.

== Demographics ==
Historical population
Census	Pop.	Note	%±
1880	690		—
1890	2,104		204.9%
1900	3,472		65.0%
1910	4,304		24.0%
1920	4,698		9.2%
1930	4,251		−9.5%
1940	3,185		−25.1%
1950	2,952		−7.3%
1960	2,783		−5.7%
1970	2,609		−6.3%
1980	2,769		6.1%
1990	2,464		−11.0%
2000	2,386		−3.2%
2010	2,367		−0.8%
2020	2,192		−7.4%
U.S. Decennial Census

=== 2020 census ===
As of the 2020 census, Cherryvale had a population of 2,192, with 874 households and 543 families. The population density was 1,093.8 per square mile (422.3/km^{2}). There were 1,021 housing units at an average density of 509.5 per square mile (196.7/km^{2}).

The median age was 39.3 years. 26.5% of residents were under the age of 18, 6.1% were from 18 to 24, 24.1% were from 25 to 44, 23.7% were from 45 to 64, and 19.6% were 65 years of age or older. For every 100 females there were 96.2 males, and for every 100 females age 18 and over there were 96.2 males age 18 and over.

0.0% of residents lived in urban areas, while 100.0% lived in rural areas.

Of households, 30.8% had children under the age of 18 living in them. Of all households, 39.5% were married-couple households, 23.6% were households with a male householder and no spouse or partner present, and 28.4% were households with a female householder and no spouse or partner present. About 32.6% of all households were made up of individuals and 15.9% had someone living alone who was 65 years of age or older. The average household size was 2.4 and the average family size was 2.9.

Of housing units, 14.4% were vacant. The homeowner vacancy rate was 3.1% and the rental vacancy rate was 7.0%.

Racial composition as of the 2020 census
Race	Number	Percent
White	1,912	87.2%
Black or African American	19	0.9%
American Indian and Alaska Native	31	1.4%
Asian	5	0.2%
Native Hawaiian and Other Pacific Islander	0	0.0%
Some other race	21	1.0%
Two or more races	204	9.3%
Hispanic or Latino (of any race)	116	5.3%

=== Demographic estimates ===
The percent of those with a bachelor's degree or higher was estimated to be 5.6% of the population.

=== Income and poverty ===
The 2016–2020 5-year American Community Survey estimates show that the median household income was $39,931 (with a margin of error of +/- $4,694) and the median family income was $45,754 (+/- $3,226). Males had a median income of $31,017 (+/- $4,615) versus $21,410 (+/- $4,678) for females. The median income for those above 16 years old was $26,731 (+/- $2,708). Approximately, 13.0% of families and 18.1% of the population were below the poverty line, including 25.0% of those under the age of 18 and 9.9% of those ages 65 or over.

=== 2010 census ===
As of the census of 2010, there were 2,367 people, 930 households, and 615 families residing in the city. The population density was 1,245.8 inhabitants per square mile (481.0/km^{2}). There were 1,087 housing units at an average density of 572.1 per square mile (220.9/km^{2}). The racial makeup of the city was 94.3% White, 1.0% African American, 1.3% Native American, 0.3% Asian, 0.2% Pacific Islander, 0.8% from other races, and 2.1% from two or more races. Hispanic or Latino of any race were 4.0% of the population.

There were 930 households, of which 34.0% had children under the age of 18 living with them, 46.1% were married couples living together, 12.6% had a female householder with no husband present, 7.4% had a male householder with no wife present, and 33.9% were non-families. 29.7% of all households were made up of individuals, and 14.1% had someone living alone who was 65 years of age or older. The average household size was 2.50 and the average family size was 3.05.

The median age in the city was 36.9 years. 27.1% of residents were under the age of 18; 8.6% were between the ages of 18 and 24; 23.8% were from 25 to 44; 24.6% were from 45 to 64; and 16% were 65 years of age or older. The gender makeup of the city was 49.6% male and 50.4% female.

=== 2000 census ===
As of the census of 2000, there were 2,386 people, 982 households, and 639 families residing in the city. The population density was 1,537.2 inhabitants per square mile (593.5/km^{2}). There were 1,142 housing units at an average density of 735.7 per square mile (284.1/km^{2}). The racial makeup of the city was 94.09% White, 0.08% African American, 1.97% Native American, 0.13% Asian, 1.30% from other races, and 2.43% from two or more races. Hispanic or Latino of any race were 2.77% of the population.

There were 982 households, out of which 31.3% had children under the age of 18 living with them, 49.7% were married couples living together, 11.1% had a female householder with no husband present, and 34.9% were non-families. 31.2% of all households were made up of individuals, and 15.8% had someone living alone who was 65 years of age or older. The average household size was 2.39 and the average family size was 2.98.

In the city, the population was spread out, with 26.8% under the age of 18, 8.2% from 18 to 24, 26.9% from 25 to 44, 21.2% from 45 to 64, and 16.9% who were 65 years of age or older. The median age was 37 years. For every 100 females, there were 91.2 males. For every 100 females age 18 and over, there were 87.2 males.

The median income for a household in the city was $27,917, and the median income for a family was $33,599. Males had a median income of $25,964 versus $19,356 for females. The per capita income for the city was $13,655. About 13.0% of families and 18.9% of the population were below the poverty line, including 26.4% of those under age 18 and 15.7% of those age 65 or over.

== Education ==
The community is served by Cherryvale USD 447 public school district, and home to Lincoln Central Elementary School (Cherryvale) (K–6), Thayer Elementary (K–8) and Cherryvale Middle/High School (7–12). They compete in the Tri-Valley League and the mascot is the Charger, represented by a knight. It was previously the Fighting Cherries. The mascot was changed in 1969 by the high school student council after an overwhelming vote of the student body.

== Notable people ==
- Sam Avey, wrestling promoter
- Louise Brooks, dancer, silent film actress, and author
- Eugene Maxwell Frank, United Methodist bishop
- Claude Wendell Horton Sr., geophysicist, acoustic researcher
- Billy Sandow, manager for world champion wrestler Ed "Strangler" Lewis
- Vivian Vance, actress who played Ethel Mertz on I Love Lucy

== See also ==
- National Register of Historic Places listings in Montgomery County, Kansas
- Big Hill Lake
- Bloody Benders
