= Parsons, Kansas =

City in Labette County, Kansas

- City
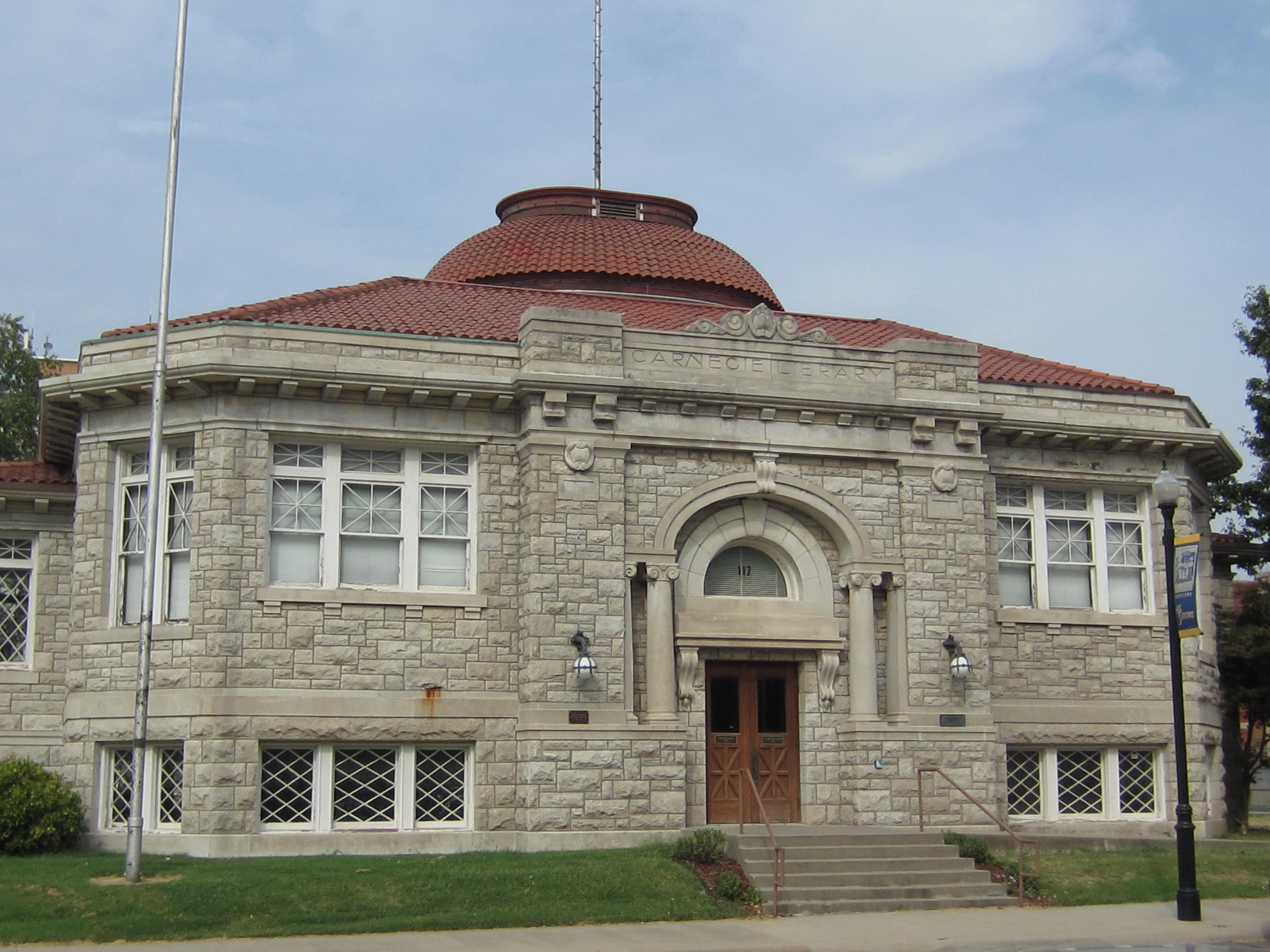
- Former Parsons Carnegie Library, now Parsons Carnegie Arts Center (2013)

- Seal

- Location within Labette County and Kansas

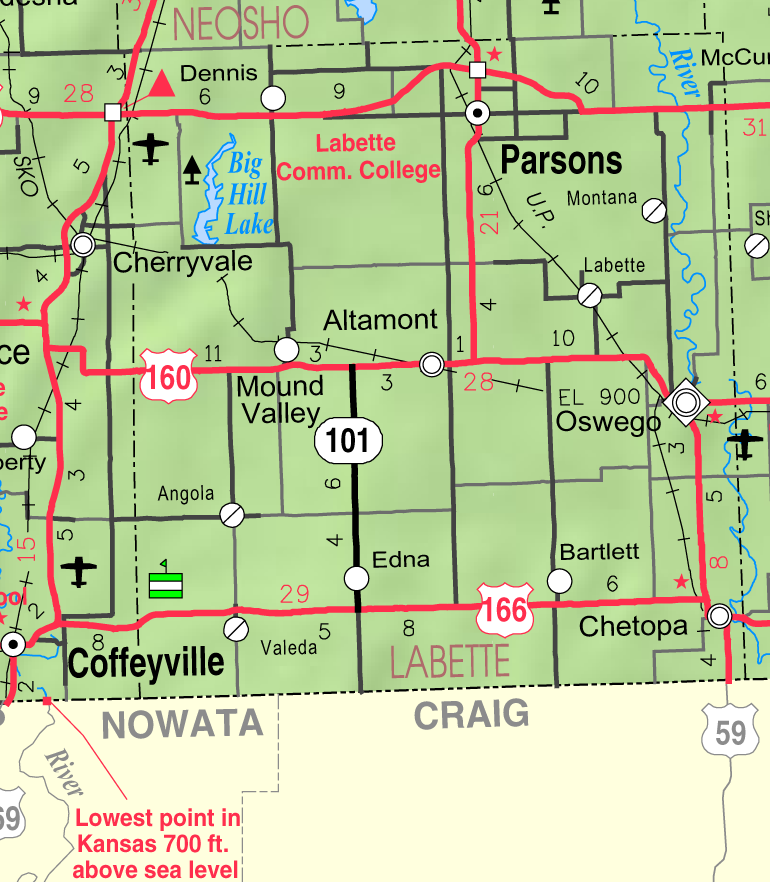
- KDOT map of Labette County (legend)
- Coordinates: 37°20′21″N 95°16′11″W
- Country: United States
- State: Kansas
- County: Labette
- Founded: 1870
- Incorporated: 1871
- Named for: Levi Parsons

Government
  - Mayor: Verlyn Bolinger

Area
  - Total: 10.72 sq mi (27.76 km^{2})
  - Land: 10.63 sq mi (27.54 km^{2})
  - Water: 0.085 sq mi (0.22 km^{2})
- Elevation: 902 ft (275 m)

Population (2020)
  - Total: 9,600
  - Density: 900/sq mi (350/km^{2})
- Time zone: UTC-6 (CST)
  - Summer (DST): UTC-5 (CDT)
- ZIP Code: 67357
- Area code: 620
- FIPS code: 20-54675
- GNIS ID: 469782
- Website: parsonsks.com

Parsons is a city in Labette County, Kansas, United States. As of the 2020 census, the population of the city was 9,600. It is the most populous city of Labette County, and the second-most populous city in the southeastern region of Kansas. It is home to Labette Community College and the Parsons State Hospital & Training Center.

== History ==
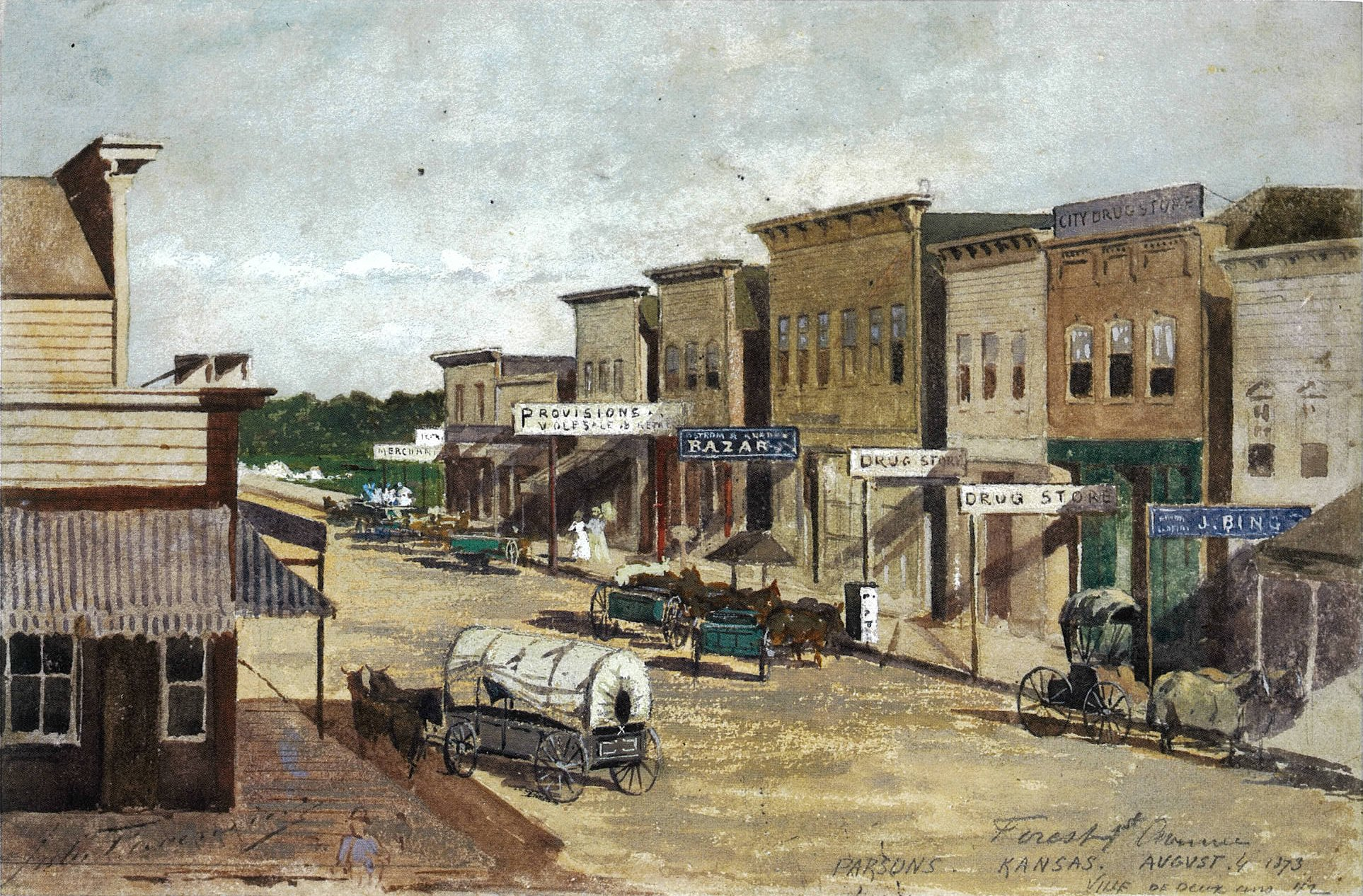
1873 Forest Avenue, now Broadway Avenue

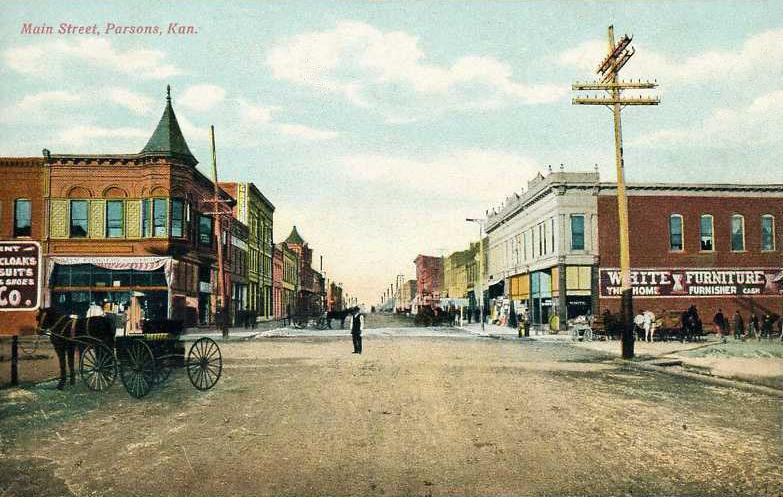
1908 Main Street

Parsons was named after Levi Parsons, president of the Missouri-Kansas-Texas (Katy) Railroad. The town was founded in 1870 and incorporated the following year by the railroad. The location for the town was chosen because it was on a flat ridge between the Labette Creek and Little Labette Creek and provided an ideal site for where the two branches of the railroad being built from Junction City, Kansas and Sedalia, Missouri would meet. The creeks were soon dammed to provide a water source. The railroad commenced building a massive rail yard, foundry, and locomotive shop at Parsons; for many years this was the third largest railroad facility west of the Mississippi River, with only Kansas City and Los Angeles being larger. Settlers from nearby towns uprooted and moved to Parsons, and new settlers arrived on every incoming train. Parsons soon became a major hub for several railroads, including the Missouri–Kansas–Texas Railroad, the Parsons and Pacific Railroad, the Kansas City and Pacific Railroad, and the Memphis, Kansas & Colorado Railroad. In the early part of the twentieth century, Parsons operated its own street car system, and also had an interurban electric railroad connecting it to the nearby cities of Cherryvale, Independence, Coffeyville, and Nowata. During World War II it was home to the Kansas Ordnance Plant, which later operated for some years as the Kansas Army Ammunition Plant. In Spring of 2005, the munitions plant was placed on the BRAC list for closure. The community has rallied behind the current plant operator, Day & Zimmerman, to keep the company on the grounds after closure and to keep those jobs and more in the Parsons area. (See link to "Great Plains Industrial Park" in "External Links", below)

=== Hospitals ===
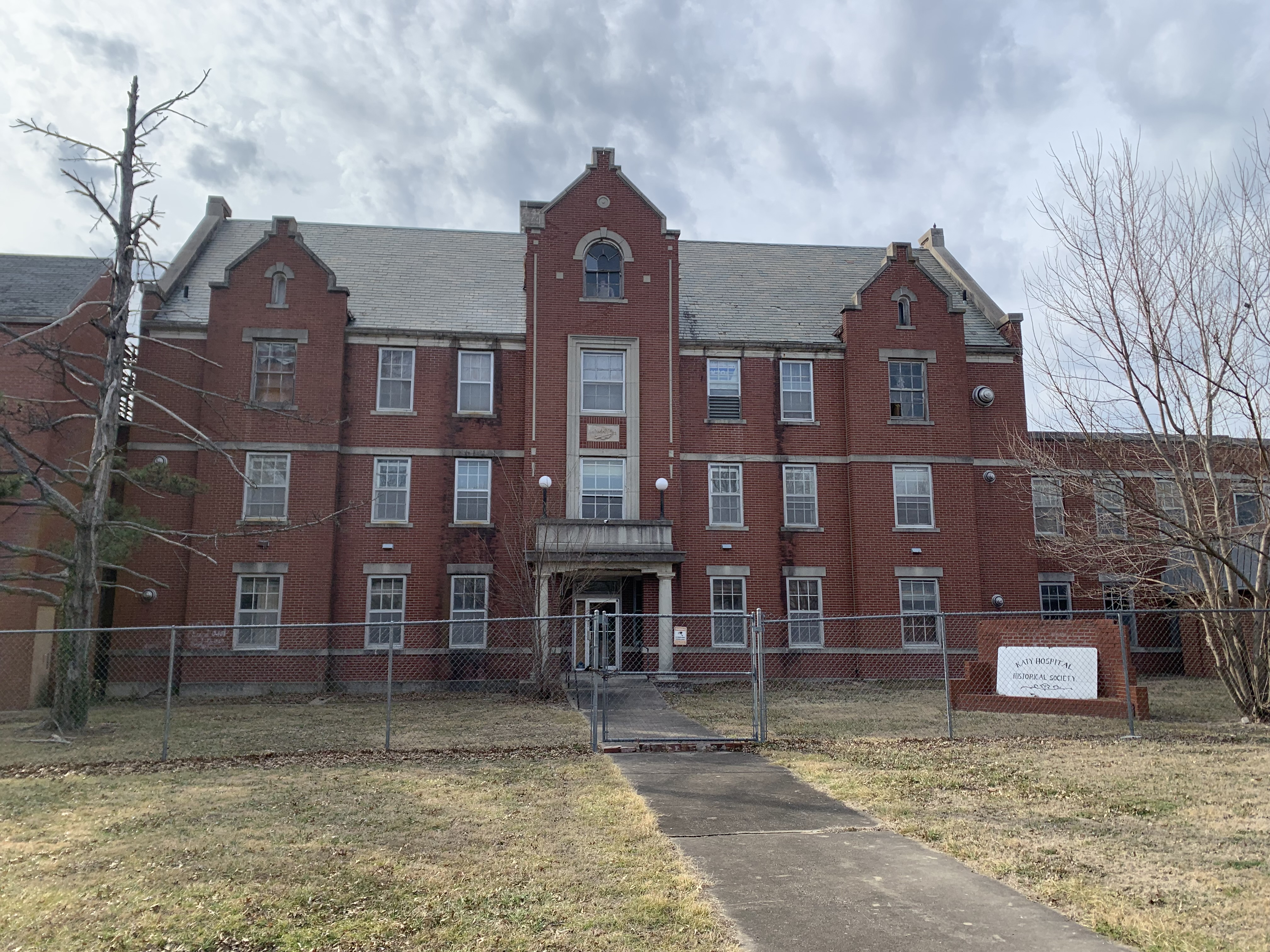
Historic Katy Hospital (2026)

Parsons is also home to the Parsons State Hospital & Training Center, which has been in operation since 1903 when it was opened as the Kansas State Hospital for Epileptics.

In 1957 the hospital was renamed Parsons State Hospital and Training Center. At that time it began providing programs for individuals with developmental disabilities. The Hospital occupies 43 buildings on 163 acres (0.66 km^{2}). The hospital also includes residential services, the University Center on Developmental Disabilities and the Parsons Research Center for the University of Kansas, the Special Purpose School of the Southeast Regional Education Service Center. The Southeast Kansas Agricultural Research Center of Kansas State University is also located on the grounds, as is the Alzheimer's Association, Heart of America Chapter, Southeast Kansas Regional Office.

Parsons is also home to Labette County Medical Center.

=== Library ===
The first library began as a subscription library in 1904 and was located in city hall. Parsons Public Library, a Carnegie library, opened on May 18, 1909. A new library opened on April 18, 1977, and the former library has since been renovated to become a visual and performing arts center.

=== Industry ===
The sale of Katy Industries to Union Pacific, in 1988, eventually saw the loss of scores of railroad jobs and, in effect, severed a major part of Parsons' city history which stretched back to its 1871 incorporation. While, in return, the city received a million dollars to help it recover (and so that it would not file lengthy paperwork opposing the sale and thus delaying it), that money is kept in a fund by the city government, which uses the accrued interest on economic development projects. The only reminder of the Katy Railroad is now found in the local historical society's museum, the annual Katy Days Festival and of course the tracks, over which trains now speed through Parsons. The Kansas Army Ammunition Plant also was down scaled in the 1980s.

Parsons is home to the Great Plains Industrial Park, built on the site of the former Kansas Army Ammunition Plant. The park is home to numerous energy and defense companies, including TP&L, Deep Fission, and Supply Energetics.

=== 2000-2020 ===
On April 19, 2000, an F3 tornado cut a devastating path of destruction through the center of Parsons. About 700 homes were damaged and about 100 destroyed, about 60 businesses were damaged and 11 destroyed.

On June 5, 2006 the National Trust for Historic Preservation named Parsons a 2006 Great American Main Street Award winner for its successful efforts in revitalizing its downtown area through historic preservation. The award was presented during the 2006 National Main Streets Conference in New Orleans. Parsons was one of only five cities receiving the 2006 award.

Parsons is the home of Dwayne's Photo, which became the last processor of K-14 Kodachrome film in the world and was the location of the final frame taken on the final roll of Kodachrome film produced. Parsons is featured prominently in the plot of the 2017 Netflix movie Kodachrome about a man who takes a road trip to develop a roll of Kodachrome film.

=== Film ===
The motion picture ZombieGeddon (2003) was filmed in Parsons in July 2002.

=== Newspaper ===
The Parsons Sun is a twice-weekly newspaper published in Parsons since 1871. At different times it was owned by Henry J. Allen and Clyde M. Reed, who would both go on to serve as governor of Kansas.

== Geography ==
Parsons is located at 37°20′21″N 95°16′11″W (37.339070, -95.269747). The city is at the junction of U.S. Route 59 and U.S. Route 400. Along US-59, the city of Erie (the county seat of Neosho County) is 17 miles (27 km) to the north and Oswego (the county seat of Labette County) is 20 miles (32 km) south and east. Big Hill Lake is several miles to the west of the city, and Lake Parsons is situated northwest of the city.

The Kansas Army Ammunition Plant (KSAAP) is located southeast of the city. The facility was completed in 1942 to support World War II operations and consists of 21 separate facilities over 13,727 acres (55.55 km^{2}). The installation is actively used as a munitions loading, assembly, and packing facility.

According to the United States Census Bureau, the city has a total area of 10.70 square miles (27.71 km^{2}), of which 10.61 square miles (27.48 km^{2}) is land and 0.09 square miles (0.23 km^{2}) is water.

=== Climate ===
Climate data for Parsons, Kansas
Month	Jan	Feb	Mar	Apr	May	Jun	Jul	Aug	Sep	Oct	Nov	Dec	Year
Record high °F (°C)	77 (25)	85 (29)	92 (33)	98 (37)	95 (35)	104 (40)	115 (46)	110 (43)	107 (42)	97 (36)	83 (28)	77 (25)	115 (46)
Mean daily maximum °F (°C)	42 (6)	48 (9)	57 (14)	67 (19)	76 (24)	84 (29)	90 (32)	90 (32)	81 (27)	70 (21)	57 (14)	44 (7)	67 (20)
Mean daily minimum °F (°C)	22 (−6)	26 (−3)	35 (2)	45 (7)	55 (13)	64 (18)	69 (21)	67 (19)	58 (14)	46 (8)	35 (2)	25 (−4)	46 (8)
Record low °F (°C)	−17 (−27)	−16 (−27)	−2 (−19)	18 (−8)	31 (−1)	44 (7)	49 (9)	47 (8)	28 (−2)	17 (−8)	6 (−14)	−17 (−27)	−17 (−27)
Average precipitation inches (mm)	1.41 (36)	1.85 (47)	3.19 (81)	4.38 (111)	5.93 (151)	5.53 (140)	3.92 (100)	3.29 (84)	4.69 (119)	3.86 (98)	2.94 (75)	2.06 (52)	43.05 (1,094)
Source: weather.com

== Demographics ==
Historical population
Census	Pop.	Note	%±
1880	4,199		—
1890	6,736		60.4%
1900	7,682		14.0%
1910	12,463		62.2%
1920	16,028		28.6%
1930	14,903		−7.0%
1940	14,294		−4.1%
1950	14,750		3.2%
1960	13,929		−5.6%
1970	13,015		−6.6%
1980	12,898		−0.9%
1990	11,924		−7.6%
2000	11,514		−3.4%
2010	10,500		−8.8%
2020	9,600		−8.6%
2023 (est.)	9,362		−2.5%
U.S. Decennial Census; 2010-2020

=== 2020 census ===
As of the 2020 census, Parsons had a population of 9,600 people and 2,251 families. The median age was 37.9 years. 24.9% of residents were under the age of 18, 8.5% were from 18 to 24, 24.1% were from 25 to 44, 23.9% were from 45 to 64, and 18.6% were 65 years of age or older. For every 100 females there were 97.8 males, and for every 100 females age 18 and over there were 92.0 males age 18 and over.

The population density was 903.0 per square mile (348.7/km^{2}). There were 4,776 housing units at an average density of 449.3 per square mile (173.5/km^{2}). Of the housing units, 15.9% were vacant. The homeowner vacancy rate was 2.0% and the rental vacancy rate was 16.0%.

98.1% of residents lived in urban areas, while 1.9% lived in rural areas.

There were 4,015 households, of which 29.3% had children under the age of 18 living in them. Of all households, 33.1% were married-couple households, 22.9% were households with a male householder and no spouse or partner present, and 33.7% were households with a female householder and no spouse or partner present. About 36.6% of all households were made up of individuals and 15.1% had someone living alone who was 65 years of age or older.

Racial composition as of the 2020 census
Race	Number	Percent
White	7,227	75.3%
Black or African American	768	8.0%
American Indian and Alaska Native	160	1.7%
Asian	71	0.7%
Native Hawaiian and Other Pacific Islander	2	0.0%
Some other race	206	2.1%
Two or more races	1,166	12.1%
Hispanic or Latino (of any race)	677	7.1%

Non-Hispanic white residents were 72.51% of the population.

=== Demographic estimates ===
The average household size was 2.2 and the average family size was 3.0. The percent of those with a bachelor's degree or higher was estimated to be 15.6% of the population.

=== Income and poverty ===
The 2016–2020 5-year American Community Survey estimates show that the median household income was $41,091 (with a margin of error of +/- $6,793) and the median family income was $54,735 (+/- $6,393). Males had a median income of $30,510 (+/- $3,819) versus $24,658 (+/- $2,536) for females. The median income for those above 16 years old was $27,206 (+/- $1,968). Approximately, 13.5% of families and 20.1% of the population were below the poverty line, including 24.3% of those under the age of 18 and 16.8% of those ages 65 or over.

=== 2010 census ===
As of the census of 2010, there were 10,500 people, 4,351 households, and 2,586 families living in the city. The population density was 989.6 inhabitants per square mile (382.1/km^{2}). There were 5,034 housing units at an average density of 474.5 per square mile (183.2/km^{2}). The racial makeup of the city was 81.3% White, 18.6% African American, 1.4% Native American, 0.6% Asian, 0.8% from other races, and 4.3% from two or more races. Hispanic or Latino of any race were 16.7% of the population.

There were 4,351 households, of which 30.7% had children under the age of 18 living with them, 38.1% were married couples living together, 15.7% had a female householder with no husband present, 5.7% had a male householder with no wife present, and 40.6% were non-families. 34.4% of all households were made up of individuals, and 12.7% had someone living alone who was 65 years of age or older. The average household size was 2.33 and the average family size was 2.95.

The median age in the city was 37.8 years. 24.7% of residents were under the age of 18; 10.3% were between the ages of 18 and 24; 23.1% were from 25 to 44; 26.4% were from 45 to 64; and 15.4% were 65 years of age or older. The gender makeup of the city was 48.5% male and 51.5% female.

== Arts and culture ==
=== Events ===
Katy Days is an annual festival held Memorial Day weekend to celebrate the Missouri–Kansas–Texas Railroad, also known as "the Katy" railroad. The founders of the festival are Mary and Pete Hughes. Activities are held in Forest Park, the largest community park in Parsons, and typically include live music, food trucks, and a parade.

== Education ==
=== College ===
- Labette Community College

=== Public ===
Parsons USD 503 public school district serves most of the city of Parsons:

- Parsons Senior High School (9-12)
- Parsons Middle School (6-8)
- Guthridge Elementary (4-5)
- Garfield Elementary (2-3)
- Lincoln Elementary (PreK-1)

Labette County USD 506 public school district serves southern and western parts of the city of Parsons:

- Meadow View Elementary (K-8)

Erie-Galesburg USD 101 public school district serves north of Parsons.

=== Private ===
- St. Patrick Catholic School (PreK-8)

=== Library ===
The first public library building in Parsons was the Carnegie Library, established in 1909. The Parsons Public Library moved to a modern facility in 1977.

== Points of interest ==
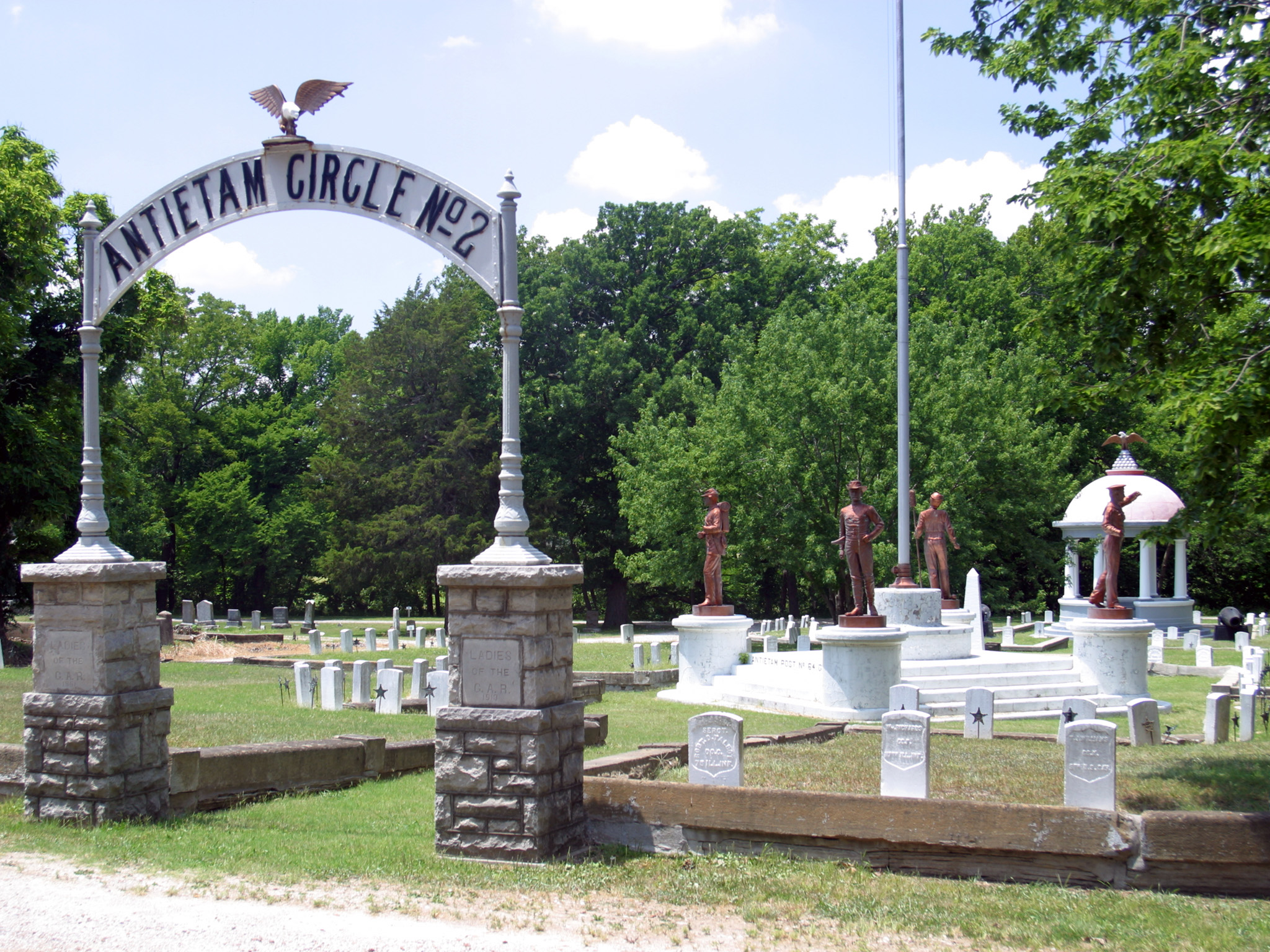
Civil War veterans bought a portion of Oakwood Cemetery in 1886 and named it Antietam Circle

- Parsons Arboretum
- Tri-City Airport
- Big Hill Lake
- Lake Parsons
- Neosho State Fishing Lake
- Oakwood Cemetery
- Parsons Historical Society Museum
- Forest Park

== Media ==
=== Newspapers ===
- Parsons Sun
- Labette Avenue
- Farm Talk
- Good News Community Newspaper

== Notable people ==
- Gilbert Baker, civil rights activist and creator of the pride flag
- Fred Bradley, Major League Baseball pitcher
- Gil Britton, Major League Baseball player
- Jamie Anne (Brown) Allman, actress
- Buck Clayton aka Wilbur Dorsey Clayton, jazz musician
- William Coffin Coleman, founder of the Coleman Company, and mayor of Wichita, Kansas
- William W. Cranston, civil war soldier and Medal of Honor recipient
- Walter Davidson, Sr., co-founder of Harley-Davidson Motor Company
- Pintip Dunn, author of young adult fiction
- Alfred B. Fairfax, Kansas politician and pastor
- Fletcher Flora, author
- Myron V. George, U.S. congressman
- Derrel Gofourth, NFL offensive lineman
- Bill Guthridge, college basketball coach
- George Harvey, professional football player
- Clancy Hayes, jazz musician
- Shaun Hill, NFL quarterback
- Ward Kimball, Academy Award winning Disney animator
- Jeff Kready, Broadway and television actor
- Roland Lakes, Wichita State and NFL lineman
- David J. Leland, politician and jurist
- Deb Miller, Kansas Secretary of Transportation (2003–2012)
- Ajit Pai, former FCC Chairman
- George Pepperdine, founder of Western Auto and Pepperdine University
- ZaSu Pitts, film and television actress and comedian
- Payne Harry Ratner, Kansas Governor
- Clyde M. Reed, Kansas Governor and U.S. Senator
- Nell Donnelly Reed, businesswoman
- T. Claude Ryan, aviator, aerospace engineer
- Dan Smith, major league baseball player
- Joe Tinker, major league baseball player and Baseball Hall of Fame inductee
- Clark Tippet, ballet dancer and choreographer
- Levi Watkins, heart surgeon and civil rights activist
- Ella B. Ensor Wilson, social reformer
