= Bentley Film Festival =

The Bentley Film Festival, also known as The Bentley's, is a film festival held annually on December 3 in Kansas City, Missouri. The festival encourages short, uncut films to be shown as original productions.

== History ==
The Bentley Film Festival first started on December 3, 1993, in Kansas City, Missouri. It is a project that is funded by Independent Filmmaker's Coalition of Kansas City. The IFC requires contestants to use Super 8 mm film and Bentley Cameras (hence the name) so that everyone has an equal opportunity to show their work. The contestants are required to have a three-minute, unedited, and undeveloped film which incorporates original and creative work.
