= Standard 8 mm film =

Type of film format

Standard 8 mm film (also known as Regular 8 mm, Double 8 mm, Double Regular 8 mm film, or simply as Standard 8 or Regular 8), is an 8 mm film format originally developed by the Eastman Kodak company, and released onto the market in 1932. In the 8 mm system, the photographic film is manufactured as 16 mm film on a spool for use in a home movie camera. The film then gets exposed on one half of the film, the operator flips the spool, and then the opposite half of the film gets exposed in the reverse direction. The exposed film is then processed, slit down the middle, spliced together, and finally wound onto a spool for viewing on an 8 mm film projector.

8 mm cameras and projectors were originally designed for 16 frames per second, but this was later changed by some manufacturers to higher speeds to reduce flickering. Most cameras designed for 8 mm film were made with consumers in mind. Typical features include spring-wound operation, lightweight camera bodies, small viewfinders, and single, fixed lenses. Only brief scenes could be filmed without pausing to rewind the spring or flip the film spool. During loading, the film has to be manually handled to guide it into a camera's film gate and onto a take-up spool, best done in a darkened area.

Standard 8 mm film cameras and projectors were prominent from the 1930s to 1970s, after which the system became obsolete in all but niche uses. The introduction of the cartridge-based Super 8 mm film in 1965 offered consumers better quality and convenience, leading to a decline of Standard 8 mm use.

== History ==
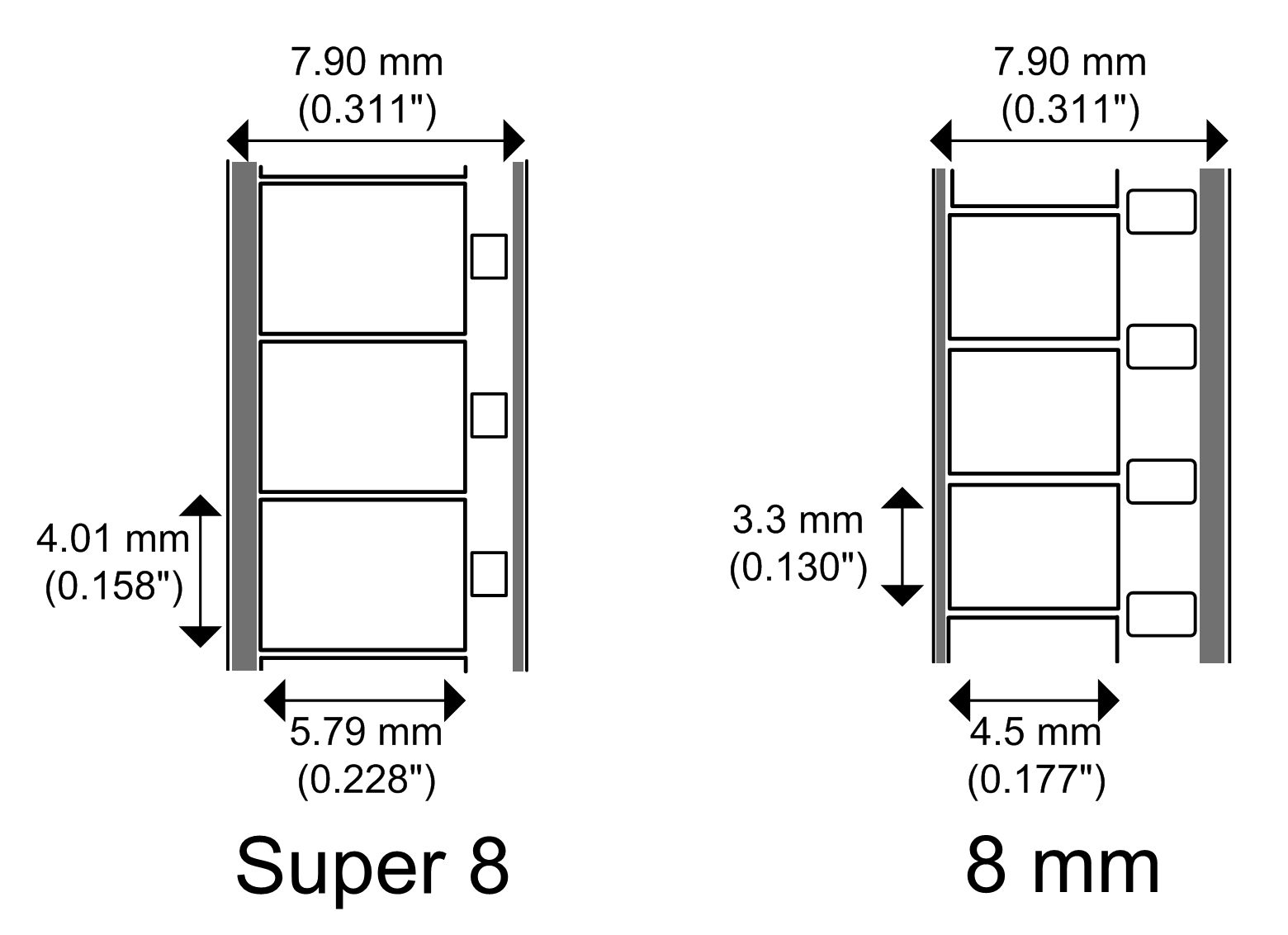
Super 8 (left) and Regular 8 mm (right) film formats. Magnetic sound stripes are shown in gray.

16 mm Double-8 film before being split into two 8 mm strips.

The format, initially known as Cine Kodak Eight, was developed by Kodak to provide a cheaper and more portable alternative to the 16 mm film format introduced a decade earlier. Kodak also introduced a line of Ciné-Kodak Eight cameras using the new format.

The format was an immediate success, but retains a number of inherent problems and quirks, mostly connected with the fact that the spool needs to be removed and reversed halfway through filming. This procedure is tricky for the inexperienced user and needs to be carried out in subdued light to avoid fogging of the edges of the film. In addition, the central six feet of the finished film includes a characteristic burst of light corresponding to the reversal point (unless the film is again edited and spliced).

The standard spool size for amateur use contains 25 ft of film, giving a total of 50 ft available for projection; at the usual filming speed of 16 frames per second this gives about four minutes of footage. In the early 1960s, a new filming and projection standard of 18 frames per second was introduced, and films with sound increased the speed again to 24 frames per second; many cameras and projectors include a multi-speed facility.

The standard 8 mm format was displaced by the Super 8 mm film format, which offers cartridge loading, a 50% larger frame size and electric-powered cameras starting from the latter format's introduction in 1965. Super 8 was criticized because the film gates in some cheaper Super 8 cameras were plastic, as was the pressure plate built into the cartridge; while the standard 8 cameras had a permanent metal film gate that was regarded as more reliable in keeping the film flat and the image in focus. In reality, this was not the case, since the plastic pressure plate could be moulded to far smaller tolerances than their metal counterparts could be machined. Another criticism of Super 8 was that more sophisticated standard 8 mm cameras permit backwind of the film – difficult but not impossible with a Super 8 cartridge – enabling simple double-exposure and dissolve effects to be made in-camera. Finally, Super 8's smaller sprocket holes, while allowing a larger frame size, were also inherently more liable to tear.

=== Packaged movies ===
Although standard 8 mm was originally intended as a format for creating amateur films, condensed versions of popular cinema releases were available on the format up until the 1970s, for projection at home. These were generally edited to fit onto a 200 ft reel. Many Charlie Chaplin films, and other silent movies were available. Short, silent versions of sound films with dialogue titles added were also released, including W. C. Fields' The Bank Dick, which emphasized the chase sequence at the end of the movie. Also available were newsreels covering the previous year and short versions of sound cartoons. Castle Films was the major supplier of these films. The Walt Disney Studio released excerpts from many of their animated feature films, as well as some shorts, in both Standard and Super 8, some even with magnetic sound. New releases of material continued until the late 1970s in the US.

== Manufacturers ==
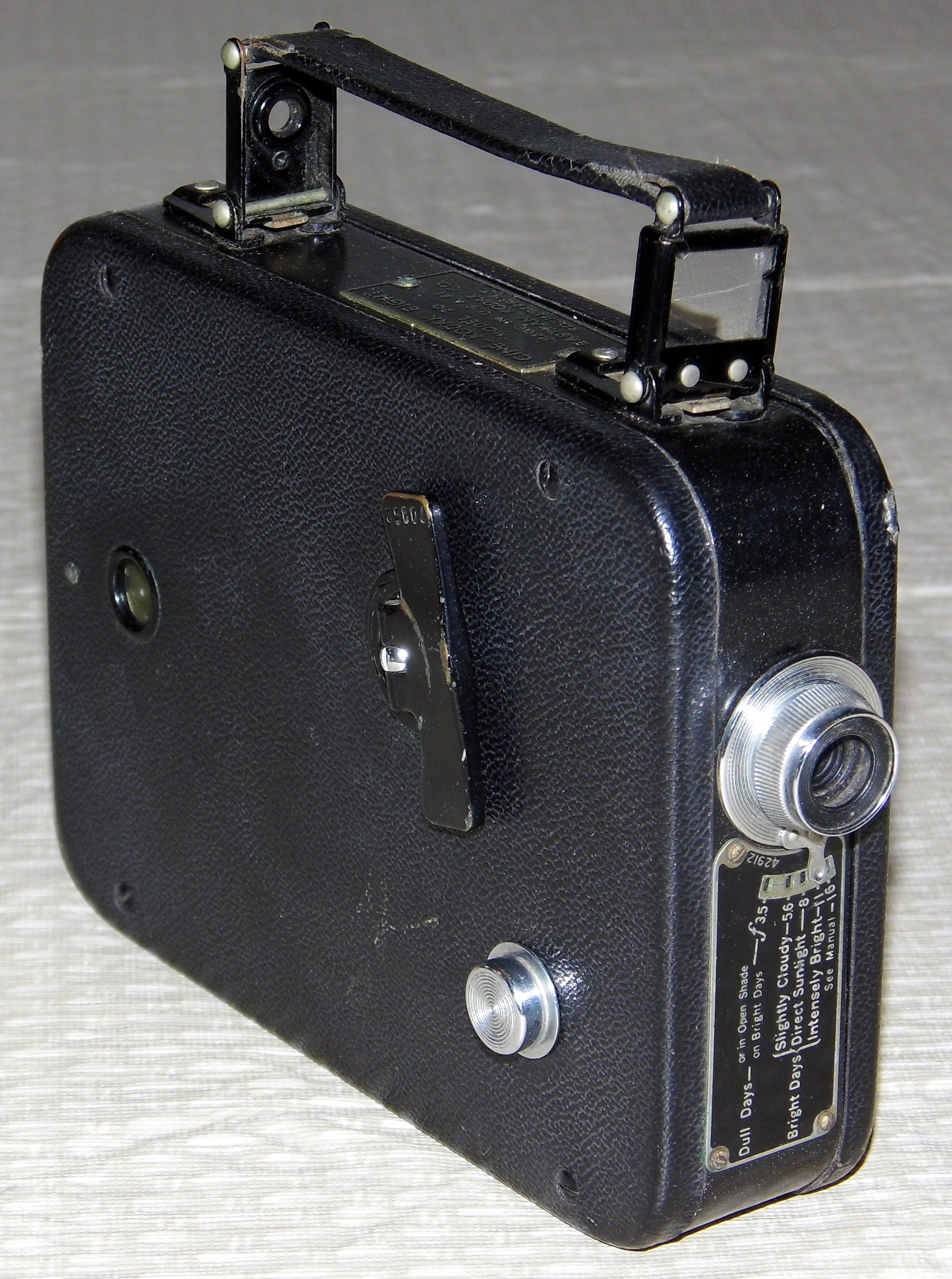
Ciné-Kodak Eight, Model 20

The first camera produced was Kodak's own Cine Kodak Eight Model 20. Like many subsequent cameras, it was extremely simple and powered by clockwork. In 1932, Siemens & Halske Berlin produced a line of small 16 mm cameras which actually used this new film size as its film as well as making a Standard 8 version that had a Std. 8 gate and also had a film cartridge which overcame the mid-film fog by just flipping over the cartridge. The Swiss company Paillard-Bolex SA introduced its first 8 mm camera in 1938 and its first 'pocket' 8 mm camera aimed squarely at the amateur market, the L-8, in 1942. Bolex cameras and projectors continued to occupy the high end of the market. In the US, Bell and Howell introduced an 8 mm projector in 1934, and in 1935, the Filmo Straight Eight camera, using pre-prepared 8 mm wide film. Standard 8 mm equipment was also manufactured by Carl Zeiss, Siemens & Halske Berlin, the Austrian firm Eumig, Fuji (as Fujica), and Canon, amongst others.

Eastman Kodak officially discontinued manufacture of the film in 1992. However, private marketed film by a "major U.S. manufacturer" (of which only one company could possibly qualify) has continued until at least late 2011. There are many cameras still in use by film students, hobbyists, and other amateurs worldwide. In the Summer of 2003, John Schwind and Karl Borowski had the distinction of convincing Karen K. Dumont, an employee of this "major manufacturer" to produce the last new variant of type K-14 film stock ever coated, dubbed "Cine Chrome 40A." This was the first new introduction of a type K-14 stock since 1988, a 40-speed, tungsten-balanced film to offset the discontinuation of "Cine Chrome 25," another K-14 product. This film was kept in production until 2006, coinciding with the discontinuation of Kodachrome 40A in that same year.

The Czech manufacturer Foma also continues to produce both negative and reversal black-and-white film in various formats including Standard 8 mm. Various stocks, both color and black-and-white, are also available, finished by the German company Wittner-Cinetec.

=== Film stocks ===
The most commonly used film stocks were produced by Kodak. In particular, the 10 ASA Kodachrome colour reversal stock, with its distinctive colour rendition and fine grain, was closely associated with the format. Kodachrome II, rated at 25 ASA, was introduced in the early 1960s. Kodak continued to produce standard 8 mm film directly up until 1992, although its 16 mm stocks are still re-perforated and respooled by other companies. Other film stocks from different manufacturers, such as Agfa's Agfachrome, were also available. And independent suppliers made additional film stocks available, resprocketing and respooling such film as Kodak' black and white Tri X, rated at ASA 200.

Kodachrome's archival qualities allow old 8 mm film to still appear fresh if stored in the correct conditions.

== Standard 8 mm variants ==
Various attempts were made to simplify use of standard 8 mm film over the years, but none was especially successful. The Straight Eight format, using pre-prepared 8 mm wide film, had some popularity in Europe, where Agfa manufactured their own stock. Kodak eventually introduced two magazine-loading system (Magazine 8 & Duex 8), but it was never as popular as spooled 8 mm film and was discontinued by the early 1980s. Some manufacturers (e.g. Pentacon in East Germany) made cameras with special magazines that could be pre-loaded with 8 mm spools. They were simply pulled out and flipped in mid-roll, avoiding re-threading the film.

== Technical details ==
8 mm Type R motion picture film
Parameter		Dimension		
Parameter		Width	Height	Corner radius
Film width	before processing	15.95 ± 0.03 mm (0.628 ± 0.001 in)		
Film width	after processing and slitting	7.975 ± 0.050 mm (0.3140 ± 0.0020 in)		
Frame size	Camera aperture	4.90 mm (0.193 in) (Note: Nominal value)	3.60 ± 0.10 mm (0.142 ± 0.004 in)	0.25 mm (0.010 in) (Note: Maximum value)
Frame size	Projectable area	4.55 mm (0.179 in)	3.40 mm (0.134 in)	0.25 mm (0.010 in)
Perforation	Size	1.83 ± 0.01 mm (0.0720 ± 0.0004 in)	1.27 ± 0.01 mm (0.0500 ± 0.0004 in)	0.25 ± 0.03 mm (0.010 ± 0.001 in)
Perforation	Pitch	3.810 ± 0.013 mm (0.1500 ± 0.0005 in)		
Film edge	to nearest projectable area edge	2.92 mm (0.115 in) (Note: Minimum value)		
Film edge	to farthest projectable area edge	7.54 mm (0.297 in)		
Film edge	to nearest perforation edge	0.90 ± 0.05 mm (0.035 ± 0.002 in)		
Notes

Standards for 8 mm film, perforation, and frame dimensions have been published by ISO, ANSI, and SMPTE.

Diagram of frames and other basic dimensions for standard ("double-run") 8 mm film

Standard 8 mm film stock consists of 16 mm film reperforated to have twice the usual number of perforations along its edges, though using the same size sprocket holes. There are 80 perforations per foot of film, exactly twice the 40 perforations per foot for 16 mm film, which gives a pitch of 0.15 in (3.81 mm) between adjacent perforations (and frames). This film is run through the camera, exposing on only half the film width; the spool is then reversed and the film run through again, exposing on the other half, which gives it the "Double 8" name. After processing the film is cut down the centre and spliced together to give one roll of 8 mm wide film. The standard spool size for amateur use contains 25 ft of film, giving a total of 50 ft available for projection; at the usual filming speed of 16 frames per second this gives about four minutes of footage.

The nominal camera aperture size for standard 8 mm film is 4.90×3.60 mm (0.193×0.142 in), meeting the Academy ratio of 1.37:1, providing slightly less than 25% of the area of the standard 16 mm frame. The projectable area is slightly smaller, and is specified at a nominal area of 0.172×0.130 in (4.37×3.30 mm),; alternatively, ISO 74:1976 gives a nominal projectable area of 4.55×3.40 mm (0.179×0.134 in).

=== Sound ===
Although few cameras were made that could record the sound directly onto the film (Fairchild Cinephonic Eight cameras, Fairchild Professional 900 cameras, and Pictorial cameras), there were many projectors that could record and replay sound on a magnetic stripe. For cameras, this stripe had to be added to the film before it had been exposed. For projectors, the stripe had to be added to the film after it had been processed. The stripe was added between the perforations and the edge of the film (see illustration at head of article). Sometimes a balance stripe was added on the opposite edge. This had no purpose other than to allow the film to be completely flat in front of the projection window.

For synchronised sound, the sound was specified as 56 frames in advance of the picture. On the Cinephonic Eight cameras, the picture/sound separation was 52 frames. Fifty six frames was the same physical distance as magnetic sound was specified for the 16 mm film format (or 28 frames in that format). Optical sound was never specified as the format had insufficient space for an optical track.

== See also ==
- Super 8 mm film
- Eastman Kodak
