= List of silent films released on 8 mm or Super 8 mm film =

Decades before the video revolution of the late 1970s/early 1980s, there was a small but devoted market for home films in the 16 mm, 9,5 mm, 8 mm, and Super 8 mm film market. Because most individuals in the United States owning projectors did not have one equipped with sound, vintage silent films were particularly well-suited for the market. A number of feature films were released in full-length versions by companies such as Blackhawk from the 1960s until the market essentially evaporated in the early 1980s with the advent of home video that made collecting "films" considerably cheaper. The silent feature films were released on multi film reels, each holding approximately 20 minutes of film, and were often expensive for the era, a feature-length Super 8 mm silent film might cost over $100 in 1970s dollars.

Among the titles that were released on Super 8 mm/8 mm format were:

- The Adventures of Tarzan starring Elmo Lincoln
- America starring Neil Hamilton
- The Birth of a Nation starring Lillian Gish
- The Black Pirate starring Douglas Fairbanks
- Blood and Sand starring Rudolph Valentino
- Broken Blossoms starring Lillian Gish
- The Cabinet of Dr. Caligari starring Conrad Veidt
- Civilization directed by Thomas Ince
- College starring Buster Keaton
- Don Q Son of Zorro starring Douglas Fairbanks
- Down to the Sea in Ships starring Clara Bow
- Dr. Jekyll and Mr. Hyde starring John Barrymore
- Foolish Wives starring Erich von Stroheim
- The Ghost of Slumber Mountain by Willis O'Brien
- Girl Shy starring Harold Lloyd
- The Girl in Number 29 starring Frank Mayo
- The Gold Rush starring Charlie Chaplin
- Grandma's Boy starring Harold Lloyd
- The Hunchback of Notre Dame starring Lon Chaney
- Intolerance directed by D.W Griffith
- It starring Clara Bow
- Little Annie Rooney starring Mary Pickford
- The Mark of Zorro starring Douglas Fairbanks
- Nosferatu starring Max Schreck
- Orphans of the Storm starring Lillian Gish
- Peck's Bad Boy starring Jackie Coogan
- The Phantom of the Opera starring Lon Chaney
- Safety Last starring Harold Lloyd
- She starring Betty Blythe
- Die Nibelungen: Siegfried directed by Fritz Lang
- Slums of Berlin directed by Gerhard Lamprecht
- Son of the Sheik starring Rudolph Valentino
- Sparrows starring Mary Pickford
- Speedy starring Harold Lloyd
- Steamboat Bill, Jr. starring Buster Keaton
- Thundering Hoofs starring Fred Thomson
- Tillie's Punctured Romance starring Charlie Chaplin
- Tol'able David starring Richard Barthelmess
- 20,000 Leagues Under the Sea starring Matt Moore
- Way Down East starring Lillian Gish
- Way Out West starring Laurel and Hardy
- Zapruder Film directed by Abraham Zapruder

== See also ==
- Blackhawk Films

== Bibliography ==
- Benschoter, Reba Ann (1971). Preliminary 8mm Film Project: Report and Listing of 8mm Films. University of Nebraska, College of Medicine, Communications Division.
- Big as Life: An American History of 8mm Films : Type X. Museum of Modern Art. 1998.
