= Independent Filmmaker's Coalition =

- Abbreviation: IFCKC
- Formation: 1993
- Type: NPO
- Location: Kansas City, Missouri
- Members: ~ 130 members
- President: Patrick Poe
- Board of directors: Patrick Poe - President Megan Boppart - Vice-President Angelica Michel - Treasurer Justin Nostler - Secretary Samuel Tady Ace Lovelace Timothy Harvey Gabrielle Mathews Drew G. Smith Jennifer Taylor Jessie Van Der Vyver Mason Vietti
- Website: http://ifckc.org

The Independent Filmmaker's Coalition (IFCKC) is a Kansas City-based non-profit organization dedicated to promoting independent film, video, and media production. The IFC meets at The Bird Comedy Theater in Kansas City, Missouri.

== History ==
The IFC was founded in 1993 by Kansas City-based professional and amateur filmmakers as an organization to support independent filmmakers.

== Mission ==
IFCKC’s mission is to foster collaboration, creativity, and innovation in the local filmmaking community by providing networking events, educational programs, exhibition platforms, and mentorship opportunities for independent filmmakers.

== Organization ==
With close to 130 paid members, the IFCKC includes professional and aspiring professional filmmakers (directors, producers, editors, screenwriters, actors, technical or artistic directors, and crew), film hobbyists, educators, photographers, writers, artists, musicians, theater professionals, advertising and marketing executives, film production and theater executives, and those in other various professions. Membership in the organization is not required to attend meetings, events, and competitions, and all IFCKC events are open to the public.

The IFC prides itself on being a democratic organization with its membership annually electing officers who serve in a voluntary capacity. Other points of pride include being an organization that:

- Has a membership encompassing all ages, ethnic backgrounds, and walks of life.
- Counts almost half of the membership identifying as female or non-binary, with membership amongst the BIPOC community growing.
- Holds monthly meetings that frequently draw 70-110 people each month and includes opportunities for attendees to promote their film-related projects, publicly introduce themselves, and network with other filmmakers.

IFC members and the public are also treated to special:

- Appearances of national filmmakers who share their experiences in filmmaker dialogues and screen their films at the Tivoli at Manor Square Theater.
- Educational workshops conducted by film professionals, including, but not limited to, screenwriters, directors, directors of photography, editors, and more.

== Membership ==
Annual dues are kept low (currently at $5/ month, $50/ year, or $100/year) so they don’t prove a deterrent to becoming a member. Dues entitle members to vote in board elections, receive discounts with community partners for gear rental, classes, venues, and more, discounted entry into film competitions, discounted entry into screenings, discounted or free access to community seminars, and in 2024 members were eligible to apply for the Filmmaker Grant of $1,250.

== Recurring Events ==
- Monthly Meetings: 3rd Wednesday of each month
- Actor's Showcase: 1 to 2 times a year
- Staged Readings: 1 to 2 times a year
- 3 Film Competitions: Spring, Summer, and Fall. Includes the One Night Stand 10-Hour Film Competition, the oldest timed-film competition in the country.
