= K-14 process =

Developing process for Kodachrome film

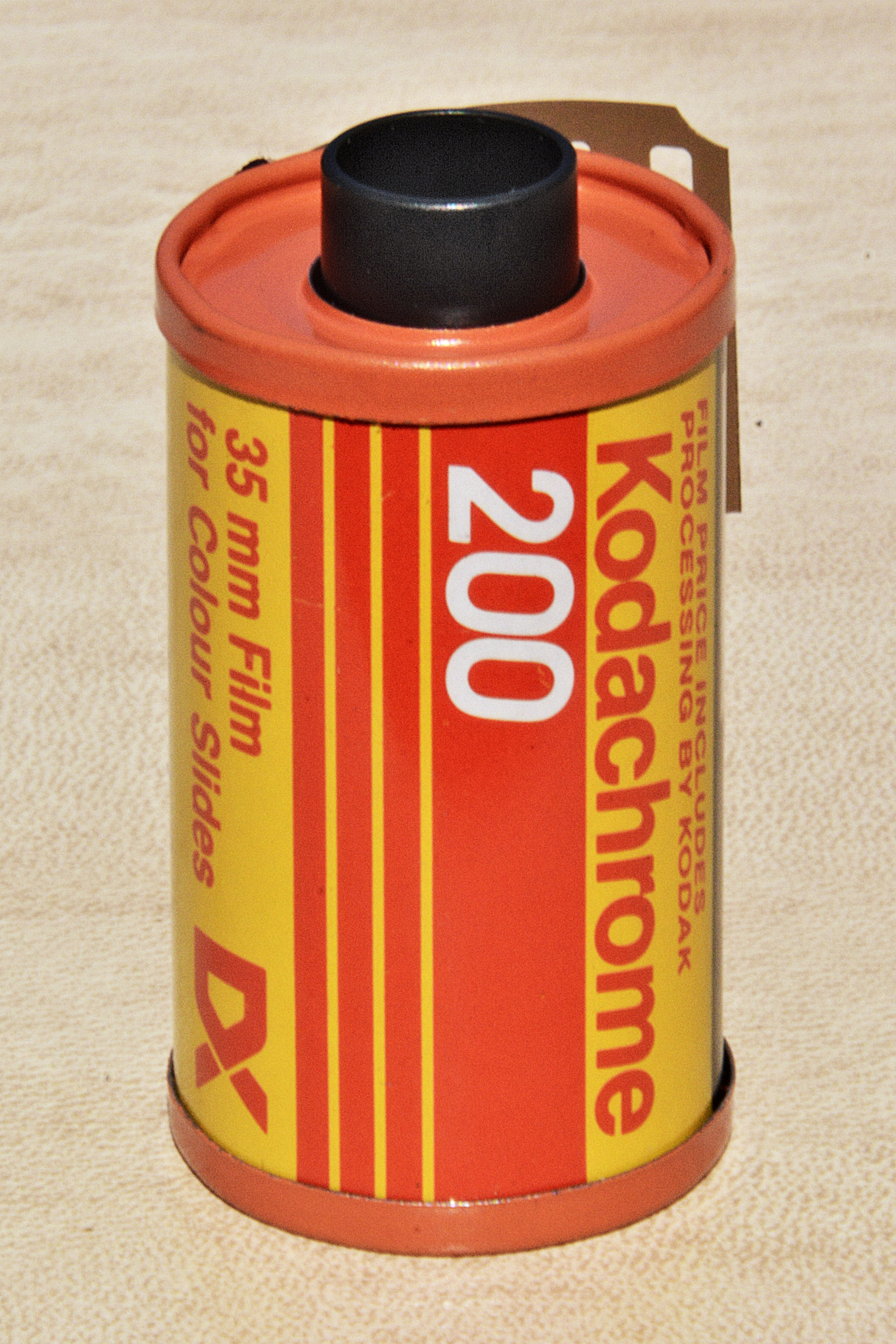
Kodachrome 200 – Film for colour slides

K-14 was the most recent version of the developing process for Kodak's Kodachrome transparency film before its discontinuation (the last revision having been designated Process K-14M). It superseded previous versions of the Kodachrome process used with older films (such as K-12 for Kodachrome II and Kodachrome-X).

The K-14 process differed significantly from its contemporary, the E-6 process, in both complexity and length. Kodachrome film has no integral color couplers; dyes are produced during processing (each color in a separate step) by the reaction of the color coupler with the oxidized developing agent, both in the developer solution.

Due to declining sales, Kodak discontinued production of all K-14 chemistry in 2009, concurrently with Kodachrome 64 film. Dwayne's Photo, in Parsons, Kansas, operated the last K-14 line in the world, discontinued sales on 30 December 2010; the last roll was processed on 18 January 2011.

== Steps ==
Kodachrome film schematic and exposure

Unexposed film cross-section

Exposure, showing sensitization of different layers according to red, green, and blue components of visible light

The cross-section of Kodachrome film consists of layers which are, from top-to-bottom: blue sensitive (of which the non-sensitized portions will be dyed yellow), yellow filter, blue-green sensitive (dyed magenta), blue-red sensitive (dyed cyan), acetate base, rem-jet anti-halation backing.

The blue-green and blue-red sensitive layers are primarily sensitive to green and red light, respectively, but are sensitive to blue light as well. The yellow filter layer is added to prevent blue light from penetrating to these layers during exposure.

K-14 processing cycle
Step	Action	Schematic	Description
1	Backing removal		An alkaline bath softens the cellulose acetate phthalate binder. A spray wash and buffer removes the rem-jet anti-halation backing.
2	First Developer		All exposed silver halide crystals are developed to metallic silver via a PQ (phenidone/hydroquinone) developer. The yellow filter layer becomes opaque because it has a combination of Lippmann emulsion (very tiny grains) and Carey Lea silver (metallic silver particles that are small enough that they are yellow rather than gray.)
3	Wash		Stops development and removes the PQ developer.
4	Red light re-exposure through the base		This makes the remaining undeveloped silver halide in the cyan layer developable.
5	Cyan developer		The solution contains a color developer and a cyan coupler. These are colorless in solution. After the color developer develops the silver, the oxidized developer reacts with the cyan coupler to form cyan dye. The dye is much less soluble than either the developer or the coupler so it stays in the blue-red sensitive layer of the film.
6	Wash		
7	Blue light re-exposure from the top		This makes the remaining undeveloped silver halide grains in the blue sensitive layer (the yellow layer) developable. The now opaque yellow filter layers prevents the blue light from exposing the magenta layer (the green sensitive layer, which is also sensitive to blue light). It is important to avoid stray printing light exposing the film base of film.
8	Yellow developer		Analogous to the cyan developer.
9	Wash		
10	Magenta developer		This contains a chemical fogging agent that makes all of the remaining undeveloped silver halide developable. If everything has worked correctly, nearly all of this silver halide is in the magenta layers. The developer and magenta coupler work just like the cyan and yellow developers to produce magenta dye that is insoluble and stays in the film.
11	Wash		
12	Conditioner		Prepares the metallic silver for the bleach step.
13	Bleach		Oxidises the metallic silver to silver halide. The bleach (ferric EDTA) must be aerated. The former ferricyanide bleach did not require aeration and did not require a conditioner.
14	Fix		Converts the silver halide to soluble silver compounds which are then dissolved and washed from the film.
15	Wash		Washes the fixer out of the film.
16	Rinse		Contains a wetting agent to reduce water spots.
17	Dry		

The result is three different color records each with the appropriate dye, just like other color films. The original Kodachrome process in 1935 used dye bleaches and was a far more complex process; the dyes themselves were unstable and faded at high temperature. Although the formulae have changed over the years, the basic process steps have followed a similar pattern since the introduction of "selective re-exposure" Kodachrome in 1938.
