= Kodak High-Speed Infrared =

Infrared photographic film

Kodak High-Speed Infrared film
- Maker: Kodak
- Speed: Not applicable
- Type: B&W print
- Application: Infrared photography

Kodak High-Speed Infrared film, also known as Kodak HIE, was a popular black-and-white infrared photographic film from Kodak. The film was sensitive to the visible light spectrum (with decreased green sensitivity), infrared radiation up to 900nm in wavelength, and some ultraviolet radiation as well.

The prominent blooming or "glow" often seen in the highlights of infrared photographs is an artifact of HIE and not of infrared light itself (nor even of all IR-sensitive films). This is because conventional photographic films have an anti-halation layer that absorbs scattered light, while HIE lacks this backing. As a result, Kodak HIE (which also had a completely transparent base, whereas most films have slightly gray bases) had to be loaded and unloaded in total darkness. Light can enter the film through the tail protruding from a 35mm canister and without a gray base it will be piped into the film and expose it; without an anti-halation layer any light entering the substrate through the emulsion will be reflected back and forth inside the film, becoming diffuse as it travels and causing halation. Nonetheless, HIE was produced without a gray base and anti-halation layers so that sensitivity would be increased by allowing light to reflect back and forth, and because it was difficult to find any way of treating the film that would be effective at infrared wavelengths.

HIE featured a polyester film base that was very stable but susceptible to scratches, and therefore required extra care during development, processing and scanning.

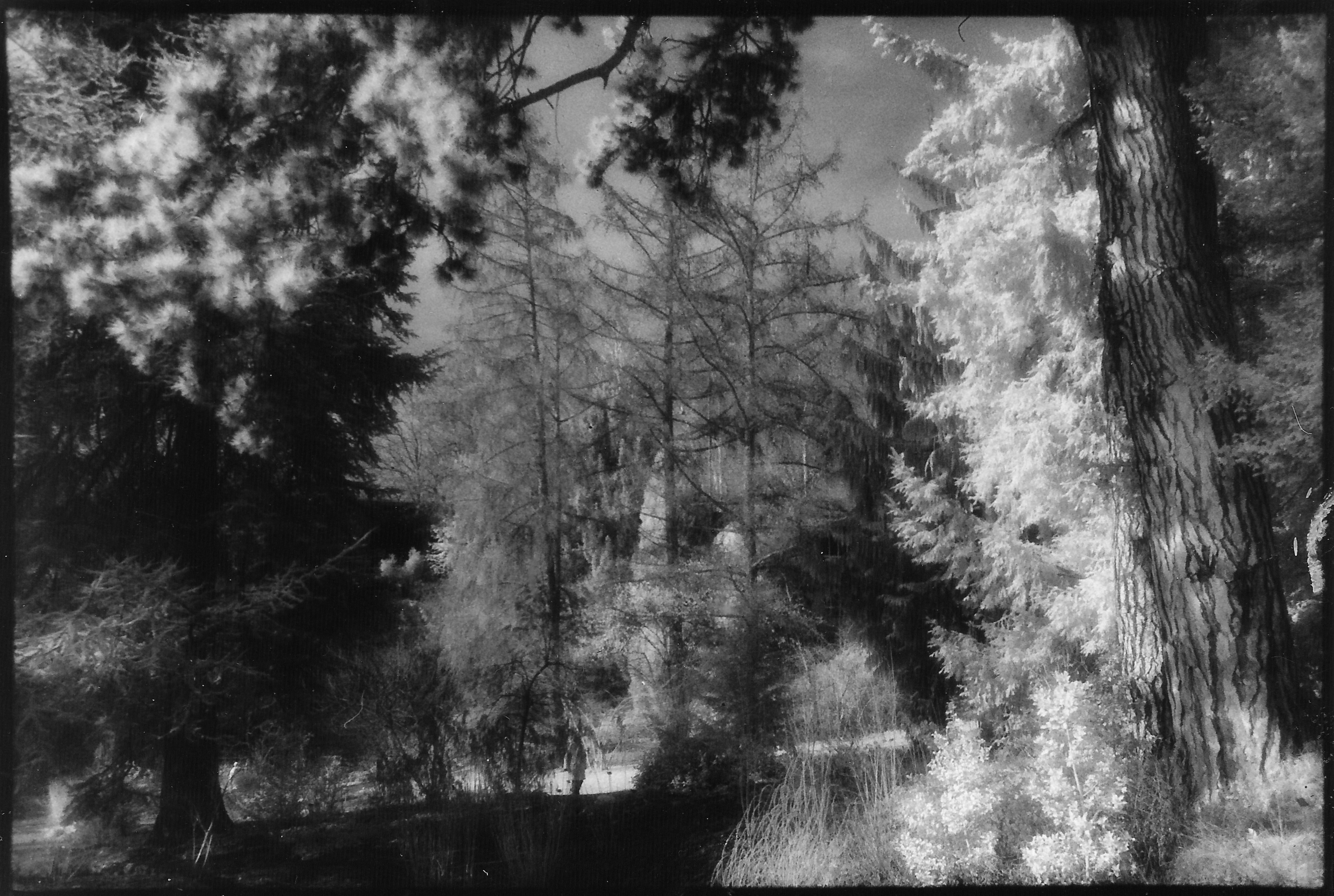
A picture taken on HIE showing noticeable blooming on the right

== Discontinuation ==
As of November 2, 2007, "Kodak is preannouncing the discontinuance" of HIE Infrared 35 mm film stating the reasons that, "Demand for these products has been declining significantly in recent years, and it is no longer practical to continue to manufacture given the low volume, the age of the product formulations and the complexity of the processes involved." At the time of this notice, HIE Infrared 135-36 was available at a street price of around $12 a roll at US mail order outlets.

Despite the discontinuance of HIE, other newer infrared sensitive emulsions from Rollei and Ilford are still available, but have differing sensitivity and specifications from the long-established HIE.
