= Kodak Pony =

Camera manufactured by Kodak

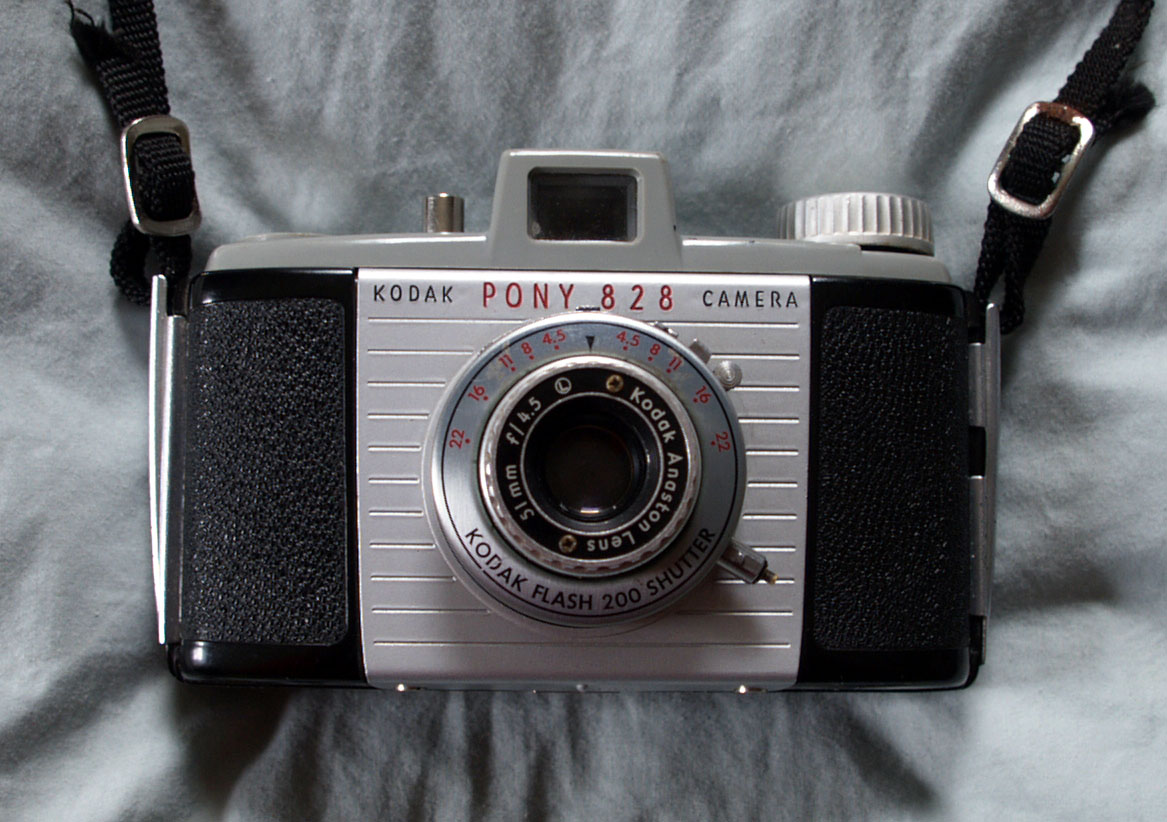
Kodak Pony 828

The Kodak Pony camera was introduced with the 828 model in 1949 as the first in a series of six Kodak Pony cameras which was produced until 1959. While the initial version of this camera used paperbacked 828 film (as used in the Kodak Bantam cameras), the five later versions were adapted to use 35mm 135 film. The cameras were designed by Arthur H. Crapsey.

The Pony had a four-speed 'Flash 200' shutter, an Anaston 51 mm f/4.5 triplet lens, and a fitted leather case. The body was made of bakelite, which was a very common camera body material at that time. Focus was achieved by estimation and use of a depth-of-field scale on the face of the shutter assembly. A flash attachment could be connected to the shutter by way of an ASA post-style connector. The shutter was manually armed—rather than being automatically cocked when the film was advanced after the previous shot, as in more modern cameras.

Kodak Pony 828 - 1949 Kodak Pony 135 - 1950 Kodak Pony 135 Model B - 1953 Kodak Pony 135 Model C - 1955 Kodak Pony II - 1957 Kodak Pony IV - 1957

The first three cameras had tubular collapsible lenses similar to the early 35mm cameras of the early 1930s.

== Technical specifications ==
- Shutter speeds: B, 1/25, 1/50, 1/100, and 1/200
- Apertures: f/4.5 to f/22
- Filter size: Series V
- Adapter diameter: 1 1/8"
- Film Size: 828 (later, 35mm)
- Exposures per roll: 8
