= Donald Finkel =

American poet

Donald Alexander Finkel (October 21, 1929 – November 15, 2008) was an American poet best known for his unorthodox styles and "curious juxtapositions".

== Life ==
Finkel was born in New York City on October 21, 1929. He grew up in the Bronx, and aspired to be a sculptor as a youth. He attended the University of Chicago, only to be expelled for smoking marijuana. Finkel attended Columbia University, where he was awarded a bachelor's degree in philosophy in 1952. He earned a master's degree in English from Columbia in 1953.

He taught at the Iowa Writers' Workshop at the University of Iowa and at Bard College in Annandale-on-Hudson, New York, prior to accepting a faculty position at Washington University in St. Louis in 1960. Finkel taught at Washington University for more than 30 years, and was an integral member of a vital literary circle there that included novelists and fiction writers Stanley Elkin and William Gass, poets Howard Nemerov, Mona Van Duyn, and John Morris, critics Naomi Lebowitz and Richard Stang, and editor and publisher of Perspective Jarvis Thurston. He taught at Washington University until 1991, and was poet-in-residence emeritus there until his death in 2008. Mr. Finkel's wife, Constance Urdang, a novelist and poet, died in 1996. In addition to his son, Tom, of St. Louis, he is survived by two daughters, Liza Finkel of Portland, Ore., and Amy Finkel of St. Louis; a half-brother, David Finkel of Manhattan; and two grandchildren.

== Poetry ==
De Witt Bell, in a 1964 review, called Finkel's work Simeon, "a book of great élan, robust in world view and vigorous in style. Both the poet and the poems seems to be enjoying themselves."

Finkel was sent to Antarctica in 1968, as part of a scientific expedition sponsored by the National Science Foundation to send artists to Antarctica. The trip spawned a book-length poem, "Adequate Earth", in 1972, and the subject reappeared in his 1978 book, Endurance: An Antarctic Idyll.

Finkel's wrote his poetry in free verse, juxtaposing different subjects against each other. Some of his poetry was extremely lengthy, with single pieces filling a volume. Finkel strayed from abstraction and used common language in his writing. He would interlace his poetry with sections taken from a wide range of works, including the writings of authors including Lenny Bruce, Admiral Richard Evelyn Byrd, Albert Camus and Franz Kafka to create what The New York Times described as a "multilayered, sculptural bricolage through which Mr. Finkel expanded the reader's sense of what was possible in the genre." Some of Finkel's best-known poems include his 1968 work Answer Back about Mammoth Cave, Adequate Earth, and his 1987 work The Wake of the Electron which was inspired by the story of sailor Donald Crowhurst, who died in 1969 while competing in the Sunday Times Golden Globe Race.

The 14 books of poetry and other works he published include Simeon (1964), A Joyful Noise (1966), The Garbage Wars (1970), A Mote in Heaven’s Eye (1975), Endurance: An Antarctic Idyll (1978), Going Under (1978), What Manner of Beast (1981) and Not So the Chairs: Selected and New Poems (2003). He translated A Splintered Mirror: Chinese Poetry From the Democracy Movement with Carolyn Kizer, which was published in 1991.

“The Invention of Meaning”

In the beginning was the hand and the poem of the hand, a breathless trope, a floating hieroglyph, seamless as water.

Then the hand spoke, and the hand said “Let there be meaning,” and the meaning sang: “Let there be love,” and the hand shaped itself another hand of clay.

Now, where there had been but one meaning, there were two. So the hands wrestled all night till they saw it was pointless.

So together they shaped themselves a cunning tongue, to arbitrate. Now, where there had been two meanings, there were three.

And the hands wrung one another, abashed, and the tongue took over.

– Donald Finkel From: Natural Bridge

== Sculpture and death ==
Before his death, Finkel returned to sculpture, creating pieces from buttons, bottles and other found objects, in a process he called "dreckolage".

He died at age 79 on November 15, 2008, at his home in St. Louis, Missouri of complications of Alzheimer's disease.
