= Kodachrome =

Brand name of an Eastman Kodak film

- Maker: Eastman Kodak
- Speed: 6/9°, 10/11°, 25/15°, 40/17°, 64/19°, 200/24°
- Type: Color slide
- Process: K-14 process
- Format: 16mm, 8mm, Super 8 movie, 35mm movie (exclusively through Technicolor Corp as "Technicolor Monopack"), 35mm still, 120, 110, 126, 828, 4×5, 5×7, 8×10, 11×14, 2.25×3.25, 3.25×4.25, 6.5cm × 9cm, 9cm × 12cm
- Introduced: 1935
- Discontinued: 2002 (ISO 25); 2005 (ISO 40 8mm); 2007 (ISO 200); 2009 (ISO 64); December 30, 2010 (processing)

Kodachrome is the brand name for a color reversal film introduced by Eastman Kodak in 1935. It was one of the first successful color materials and was used for both cinematography and still photography. For many years, Kodachrome was widely used for professional color photography, especially for images intended for publication in print media.

Because of its complex processing requirements, the film was initially sold only with the cost of processing; independent photography stores were prohibited from developing Kodachrome. To develop the film, customers had to mail it to Kodak, which would then send the developed film back as part of the purchase price. In 1954, the U.S. Department of Justice found that this practice violated antitrust laws by being uncompetitive. Kodak then entered into a consent decree, requiring the company to offer Kodachrome film for sale without the development fee, as well as license Kodachrome development patents to independent photography stores. Kodak had sold mailers to users who wanted their films to be processed by them. Nonetheless, the process-paid arrangement continued in other markets around the world.

Eventually, the growth and popularity of alternative photographic materials, and, much later, the widespread transition to digital photography, led to Kodachrome's loss of market share. Its manufacture was discontinued in 2009, and processing ended in December 2010. In early 2017, Kodak announced it was investigating the possibility of re-introducing Kodachrome, but later conceded that this was unlikely to happen.

== Background ==
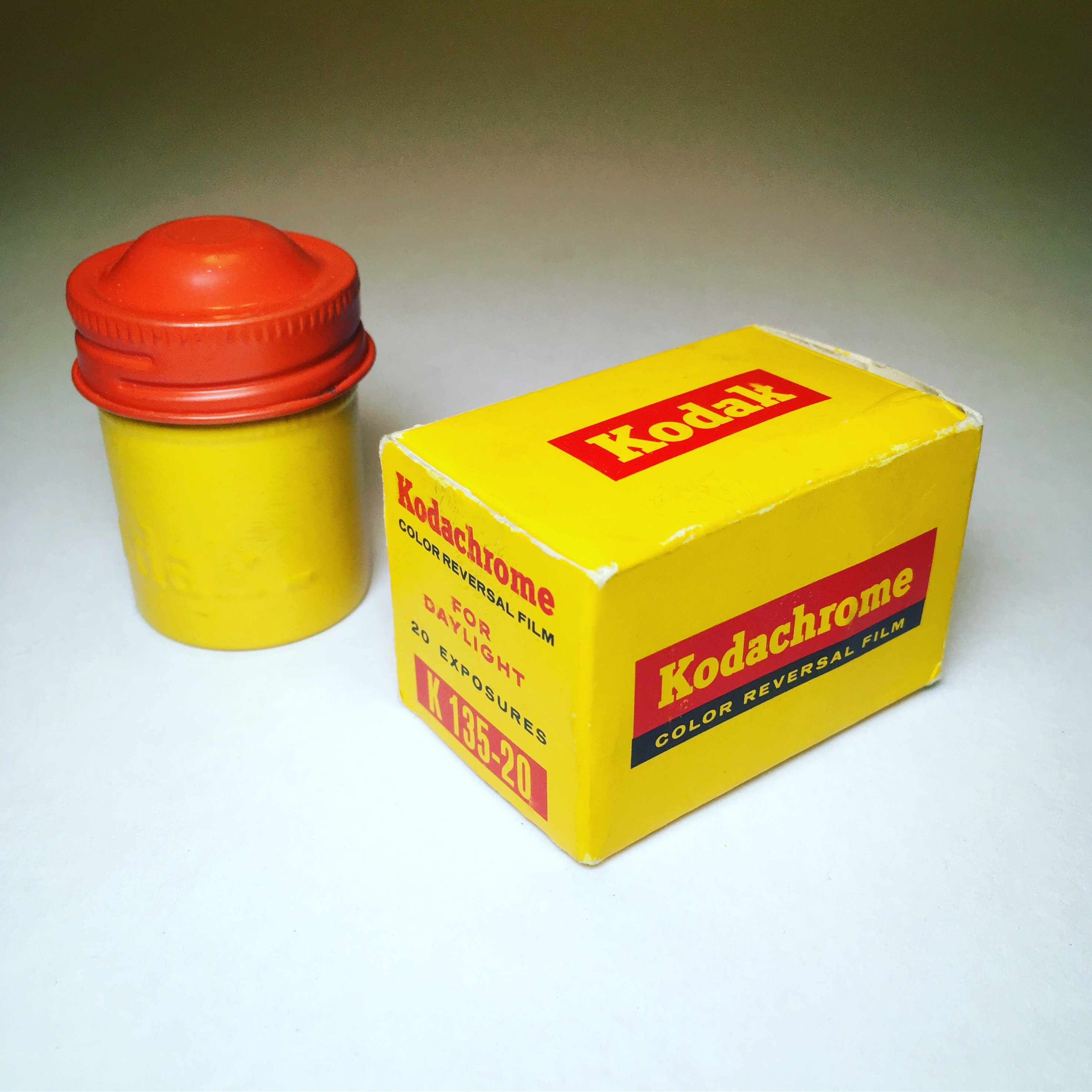
Kodachrome K135 20 Color Reversal film

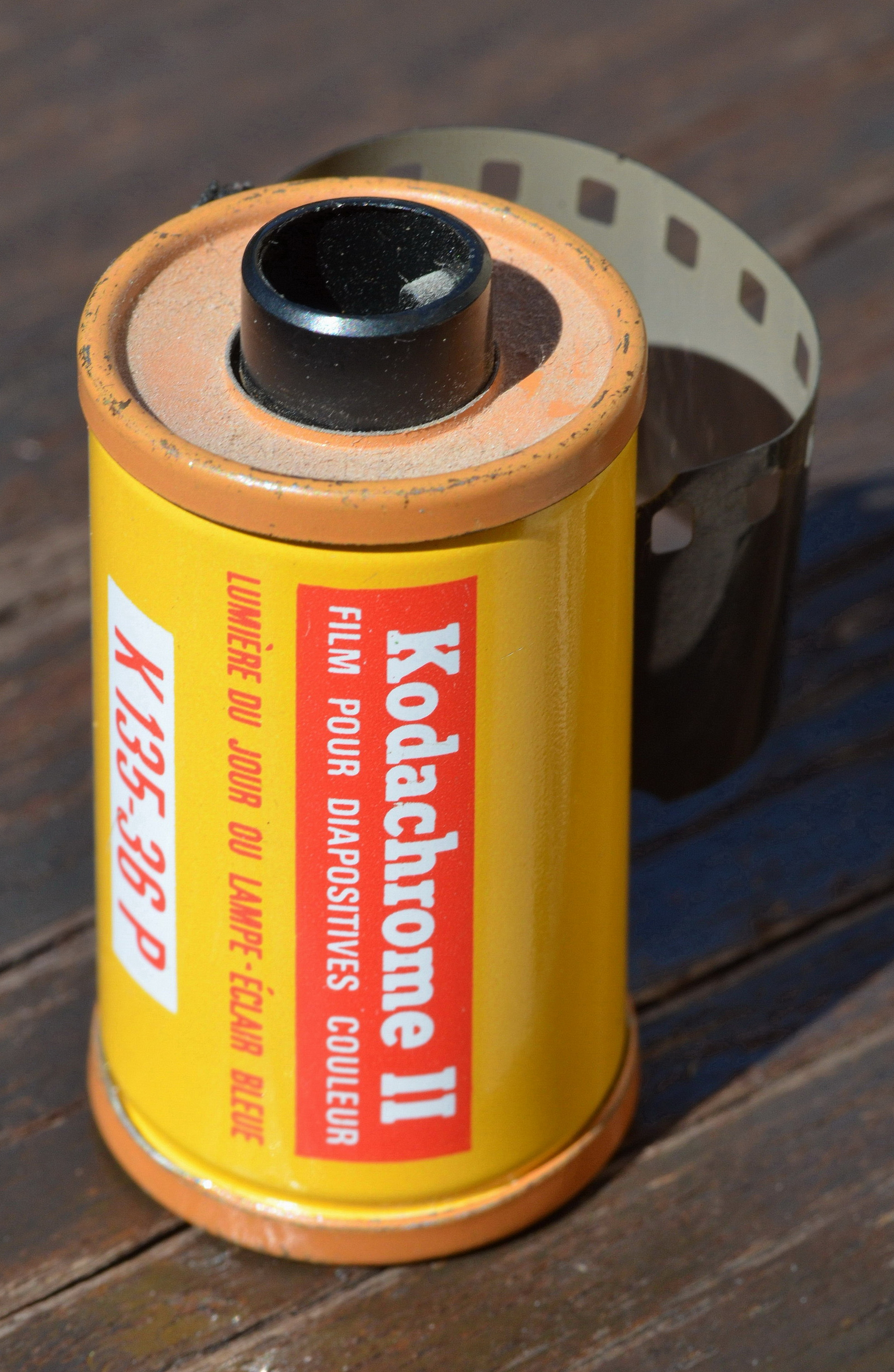
Kodachrome II – film for color slides; the 35mm still photography format is shown above

Kodachrome was the first color film to be successfully mass-marketed that used a subtractive color method. Previous materials, such as Autochrome and Dufaycolor, had used the additive screenplate methods. Until its discontinuation, Kodachrome was the oldest surviving brand of color film. It was manufactured for 74 years in various formats to suit still and motion picture cameras, including 8mm, Super 8, 16mm for movies (exclusively through Eastman Kodak), 35mm for movies (exclusively available through Technicolor Corp as "Technicolor Monopack") and 135, 120, 110, 126, 828 and large format for still photography.

Kodachrome is appreciated in the archival and professional market for its accurate color reproduction and dark-storage longevity. Because of these qualities, it was used by Walton Sound and Film Services in the UK in 1953 for the official 16mm film of the coronation of Elizabeth II of the United Kingdom. Copies of the film for sale to the public were also produced using Kodachrome. More recent professional film photographers such as Steve McCurry, David Alan Harvey, Peter Guttman and Alex Webb also favored the film. It was used by McCurry for his iconic 1984 portrait of Sharbat Gula, Afghan Girl, for National Geographic magazine.

== History ==
=== Before Kodachrome ===
Before Kodachrome film was marketed in 1935 most color photography had been achieved using films that employed additive color methods and materials, such as Autochrome and Dufaycolor. These first practical color processes had several disadvantages because they used a Réseau filter made from discrete color elements that were visible upon enlargement. The finished transparencies absorbed between 70% and 80% of light upon projection, requiring very bright projection lamps, especially for large projections. Subtractive color methods avoided these disadvantages.

Rudolf Fischer was granted a patent in 1913 for a proposed color photography process in which three separate emulsions, each sensitive to a different color, would be exposed simultaneously. However, Fischer was unable to implement the idea.

=== First use of 'Kodachrome' name ===
The first Kodak product called Kodachrome was invented by John Capstaff in 1913. (Note: Capstaff, a former portrait photographer and physics and engineering student had already worked on colour photography before he joined C.K. Mees and other former Wratten and Wainright employees in their move to Rochester in 1912–1913 after Eastman had bought that company to persuade Mees to come and work for him.) His Kodachrome was a subtractive process that used only two colours: blue-green and red-orange. It required two glass plate negatives, one made using a panchromatic emulsion and a red filter, the other made using an emulsion insensitive to red light. The two plates could be exposed as a "bipack" (sandwiched emulsion to emulsion, with a very thin red filter layer between), which eliminated the need for multiple exposures or a special color camera. After development, the silver images were bleached out with chemistry that hardened the bleached portions of the gelatin.

Using dyes that were absorbed only by the unhardened gelatin, the negative that recorded the blue and green light was dyed red-orange and the red-exposed negative was dyed blue-green. The result was a pair of positive dye images. The plates were then assembled emulsion to emulsion, producing transparency that was capable of good (for a two-colour process) colour rendition of skin tones in portraits. Capstaff's Kodachrome was made commercially available in 1915. It was also adapted for use as a 35mm motion picture film process. Today, this first version of Kodachrome is nearly forgotten, overshadowed by the next Kodak product bearing the same name Kodachrome.

In 2012 Capstaff's early film tests were added to the United States Library of Congress National Film Registry under the title Two-Color Kodachrome Test Shots No. III (1922) for being "culturally, historically or aesthetically significant."

=== Development of modern Kodachrome ===
The next version of Kodachrome was invented in the early 1930s by two professional musicians, Leopold Godowsky Jr. and Leopold Mannes, who were also university-trained scientists.

Mannes and Godowsky first took an interest in color photography as high school students in 1917, when they saw a movie called Our Navy, a movie production using a four-color additive process. Both agreed the color was terrible. After researching the subject in the library, they started to experiment with additive color processes. Their experiments were continued during their college years, eventually producing a camera having two lenses that projected images side by side on a single strip of film. The color rendition of this additive two-color process was of fair quality, but aligning the two lenses of the projector was difficult.

Their experiments, which continued after they finished college, turned from multiple lenses that produced multiple, differently colored images that had to be combined to form the final transparency, to multiple layered film in which the different color images were already combined and therefore perfectly aligned. Such a multi-layered film had already been invented and patented in 1912 by the German inventor Rudolph Fischer. Each of the three layers in the proposed film would be sensitive to one of the three primary colors, and each of the three layers would have substances (called "color couplers") embedded in them that would form a dye of the required color when combined with the by-products of the developing silver image. When the silver images were bleached away, the three-color dye image would remain. Fischer, however, failed to find a way to stop the color couplers and color sensitizing dyes from wandering from one layer into the other, where they would produce unwanted colors.

Mannes and Godowsky, using a similar approach, started experimenting with color couplers, but their experiments were hindered by a lack of money, supplies and facilities. In 1922 Robert Wood, a friend of Mannes, wrote a letter of introduction for Mannes and Godowsky to Kodak chief scientist Kenneth Mees, referencing their experiments and asking if Mees could let them use the Kodak facilities for a few days. Mees offered to help, and after meeting with Mannes and Godowsky, agreed to supply them with multi-layer emulsions made to their specifications. The pair then secured a $20,000 loan from the New York investment firm Kuhn, Loeb and Company, instigated by a secretary there that Mees had befriended.

By 1924, they patented a two-color process that employed "controlled diffusion". By timing how long it took for an image to form in the top layer ahead of the lower level, they began to probe the prospects of timed processing as a means of controlling wandering dyes. Some three years later they were still experimenting with such a method in a multi-layer emulsion, but by then they had decided that instead of incorporating the color couplers into the emulsion layers themselves, they could be added to the developing chemicals.

When their money ran out in 1929, Mees helped them once more. He knew that the solution to the problem of the wandering dyes had already been found by one of Kodak's scientists, Leslie Brooker, and so fronted Mannes and Godowsky the money to pay off their loan with Kuhn Loeb and offered them a yearly salary, coupled to a three-year deadline to come up with a finished and commercially viable product.

Shortly before their deadline at the end of 1933, Mannes and Godowsky had not produced anything usable, and thought their experiments would be terminated by Kodak. Instead, Mees granted them a one-year extension and, still having technical challenges, they eventually presented Mees with a mere two-color movie process in 1934, just as the original Kodachrome invented by John Capstaff some 20 years earlier.

Mees immediately set things in motion to produce and market this film, but just before Kodak was about to do so in 1935, Mannes and Godowsky completed work on the long-awaited but no longer expected, much better, three-color version. On April 15, 1935, this new film, borrowing the name from Capstaff's process, was formally announced.

=== Launch and later history ===
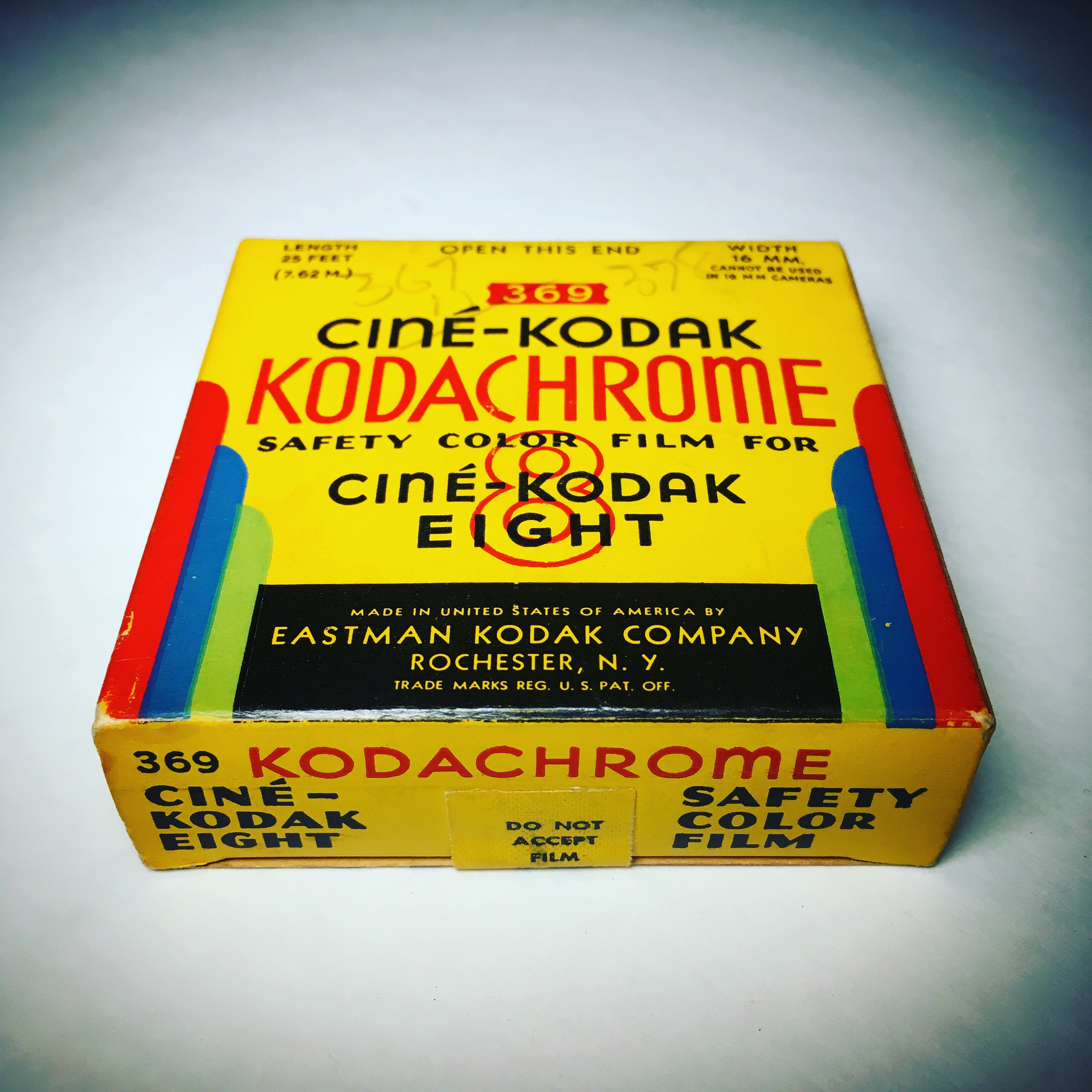
Ciné-Kodak Kodachrome 8mm movie film (expired May 1946)

Kodachrome was first sold in 1935 as 16 mm movie film with an ASA speed of 10 and the following year it was made available as 8mm movie film, and in 135 and 828 formats for still cameras.

In 1961, Kodak released Kodachrome II with sharper images and faster speeds at 25 ASA. In 1962, Kodachrome-X at ASA 64 was introduced. In 1974, with the transition to the K-14 process, Kodachrome II and Kodachrome-X were replaced by Kodachrome 25 and Kodachrome 64.

In later years, Kodachrome was produced in a wide variety of film formats including 120 and 4 in × 5 in (100 mm × 130 mm), and in ISO-ASA values ranging from 8 to 200.

Until manufacturing was taken over by rival film manufacturer GAF, View-Master stereo reels used Kodachrome films.

=== Decline and discontinuation ===
Later color transparency films, such as Agfachrome, Anscochrome, Fujichrome and Kodak's own Ektachrome used simpler, quicker, and more accessible color development processes. Their higher film speeds also eroded Kodachrome's market share, as the quality of competing films improved over time. As digital photography reduced the demand for all film after 2000, Kodachrome sales further declined. On June 22, 2009, Kodak announced it would no longer manufacture Kodachrome film, citing declining demand. During its heyday, many Kodak and independent laboratories processed Kodachrome, but by 2010, only one Kodak-certified facility remained: Dwayne's Photo in Parsons, Kansas. On July 14, 2010, it was announced that the last roll of Kodachrome manufactured had been developed by Dwayne's for photographer Steve McCurry, a National Geographic photographer. McCurry had asked Kodak for the last roll in stock, then went out on his own to use that roll. Although McCurry retains ownership of the slides, prints of the 36 exposures are permanently housed at the George Eastman House in Rochester, New York and most of the pictures have been published online by Vanity Fair magazine.

==== 2017 reintroduction rumors ====
After announcing the return of Ektachrome at the beginning of 2017, Eastman Kodak CMO Steven Overman told The Kodakery podcast, "we are investigating Kodachrome, looking at what it would take to bring that back". Although the statement generated widespread media interest, it was subsequently conceded by an official at Kodak Alaris (which would be responsible for its production and sale) that the return of Kodachrome was probably impractical (due to the difficulty in restoring the now-dismantled infrastructure needed to support it) and therefore unlikely.

== Characteristics ==
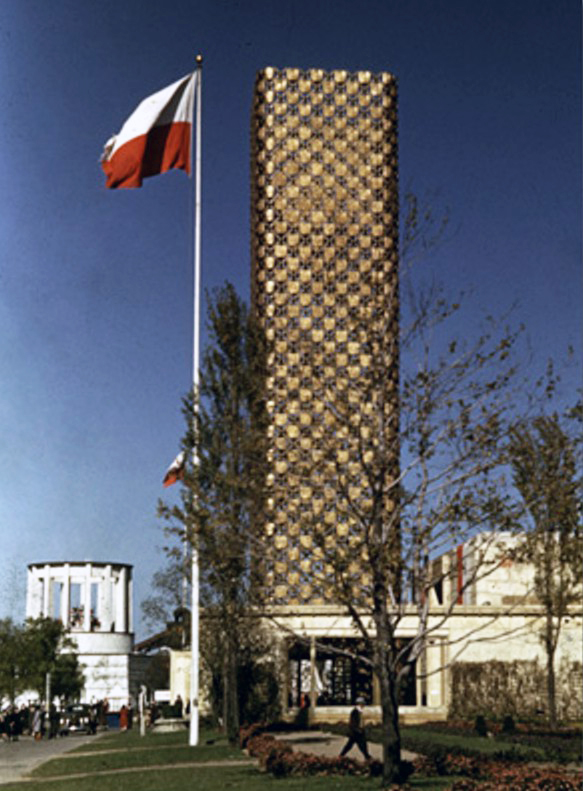
Kodachrome photo taken at the 1939 New York World's Fair

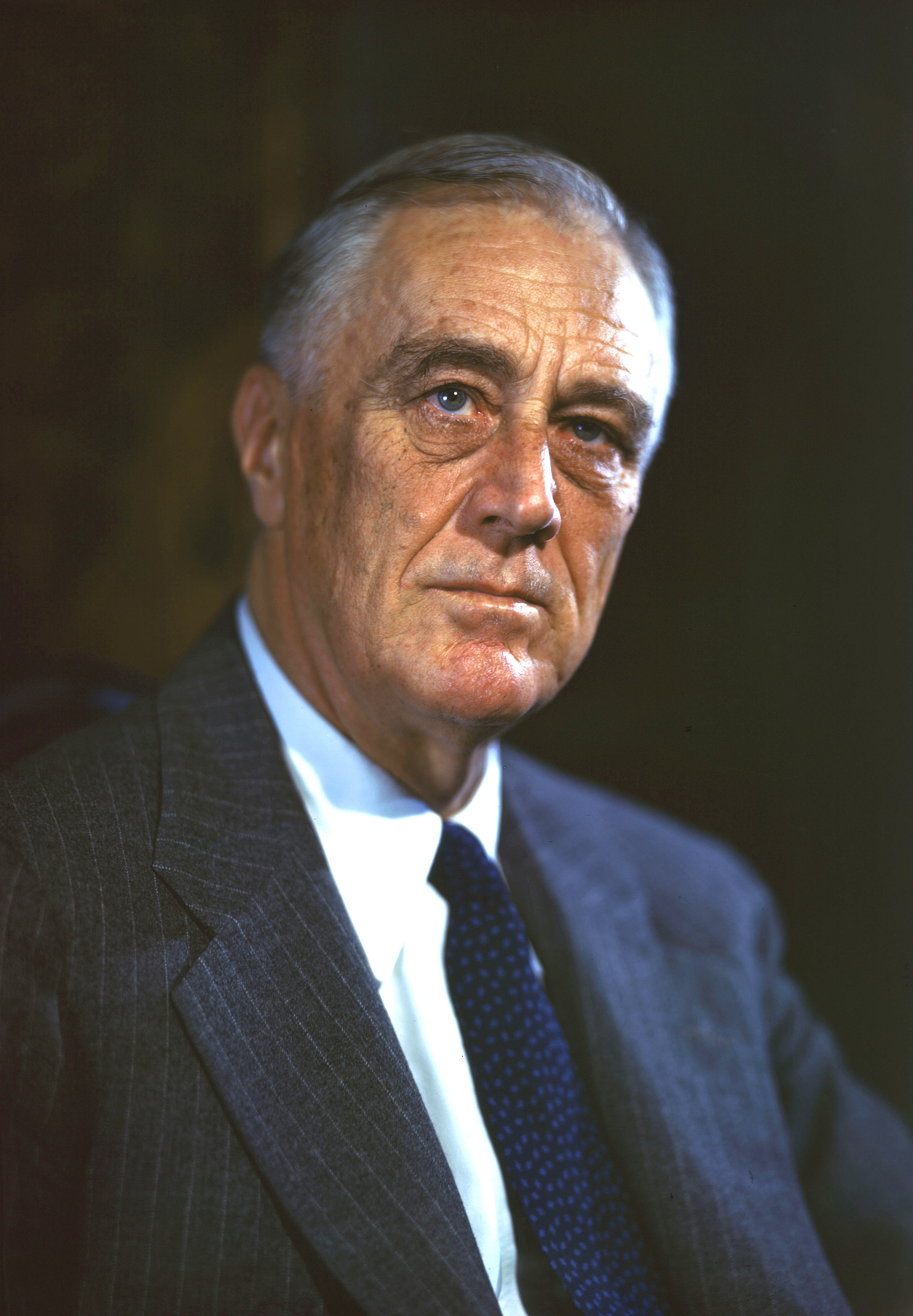
Kodachrome photo, President Franklin D. Roosevelt, USA, 1944

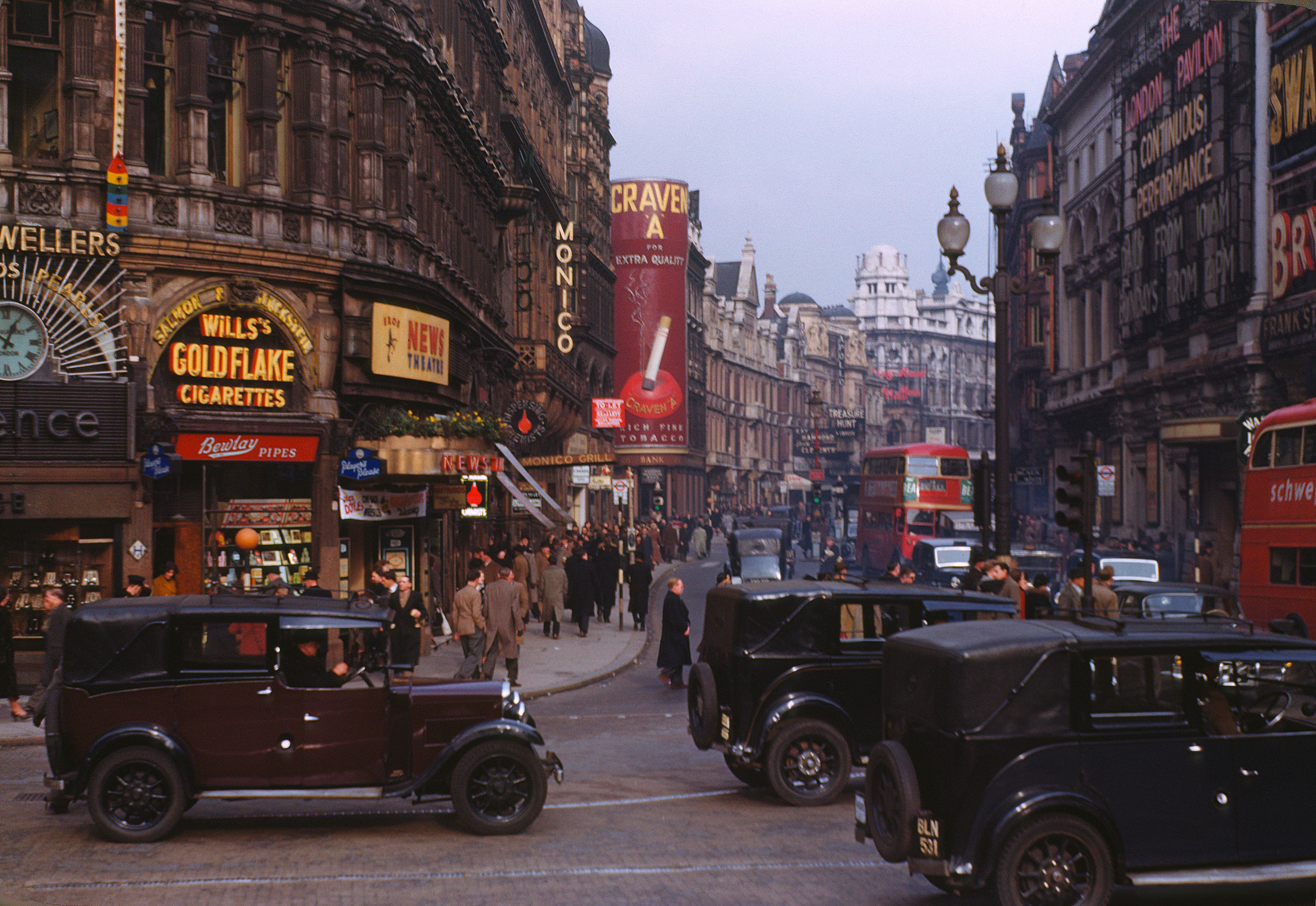
Kodachrome photo by Chalmers Butterfield of Shaftesbury Avenue from Piccadilly Circus, in the West End of London, England, c. 1949

=== Emulsion ===
Kodachrome films are non-substantive. Unlike substantive transparency and negative color films, Kodachrome film does not incorporate dye couplers into the emulsion layers. The dye couplers are added during processing. This means that Kodachrome emulsion layers are thinner and less light is scattered upon exposure, meaning that the film could record an image with more sharpness than substantive films. Transparencies made with non-substantive films have an easily visible relief image on the emulsion side of the film. Kodachrome 64 and 200 can record a dynamic range of about 2.3D or 8 f-stops, Kodachrome 25 transparencies have a dynamic range of around 12 f-stops, or 3.6–3.8D.

=== Color ===
The color rendering of Kodachrome films was unique in color photography for several decades after its introduction in the 1930s. Even after the introduction of other successful professional color films, such as Fuji Velvia, some professionals continued to prefer Kodachrome, and maintain that it still has certain advantages over digital. Steve McCurry told Vanity Fair magazine:

If you have good light and you're at a fairly high shutter speed, it's going to be a brilliant color photograph. It had a great color palette. It wasn't too garish. Some films are like you're on a drug or something. Velvia made everything so saturated and wildly over-the-top, too electric. Kodachrome had more poetry in it, a softness, an elegance. With digital photography, you gain many benefits [but] you have to put in post-production. [With Kodachrome,] you take it out of the box and the pictures are already brilliant.

=== Contrast ===
Kodachrome is generally used for direct projection using white light. As such, it possesses a relatively high contrast.

For professional uses, where duplication is expected and required, a special version, Kodachrome Commercial (KCO), was available in a 35 mm BH-perforated base (exclusively through Technicolor) and in a 16 mm base (exclusively through Eastman Kodak's professional products division). In both cases, Eastman Kodak performed the processing.

Kodachrome Commercial has a low-contrast characteristic that complements the various duplication films with which it is intended to be used: silver separation negatives for 35 mm (controlled exclusively by Technicolor) and reversal duplicating and printing stocks for 16 mm (controlled exclusively by Eastman Kodak).

Kodachrome Commercial was available until the mid-1950s, after which Ektachrome Commercial (ECO) replaced it for these specific applications.

After the late 1950s, 16 mm Kodachrome Commercial-originated films (and Ektachrome Commercial-originated films as well) were quite often duplicated onto Eastmancolor internegative film, after which these films were printed on Eastmancolor positive print film, as a cost-reduction measure, thereby yielding relatively low-cost prints for direct projection.

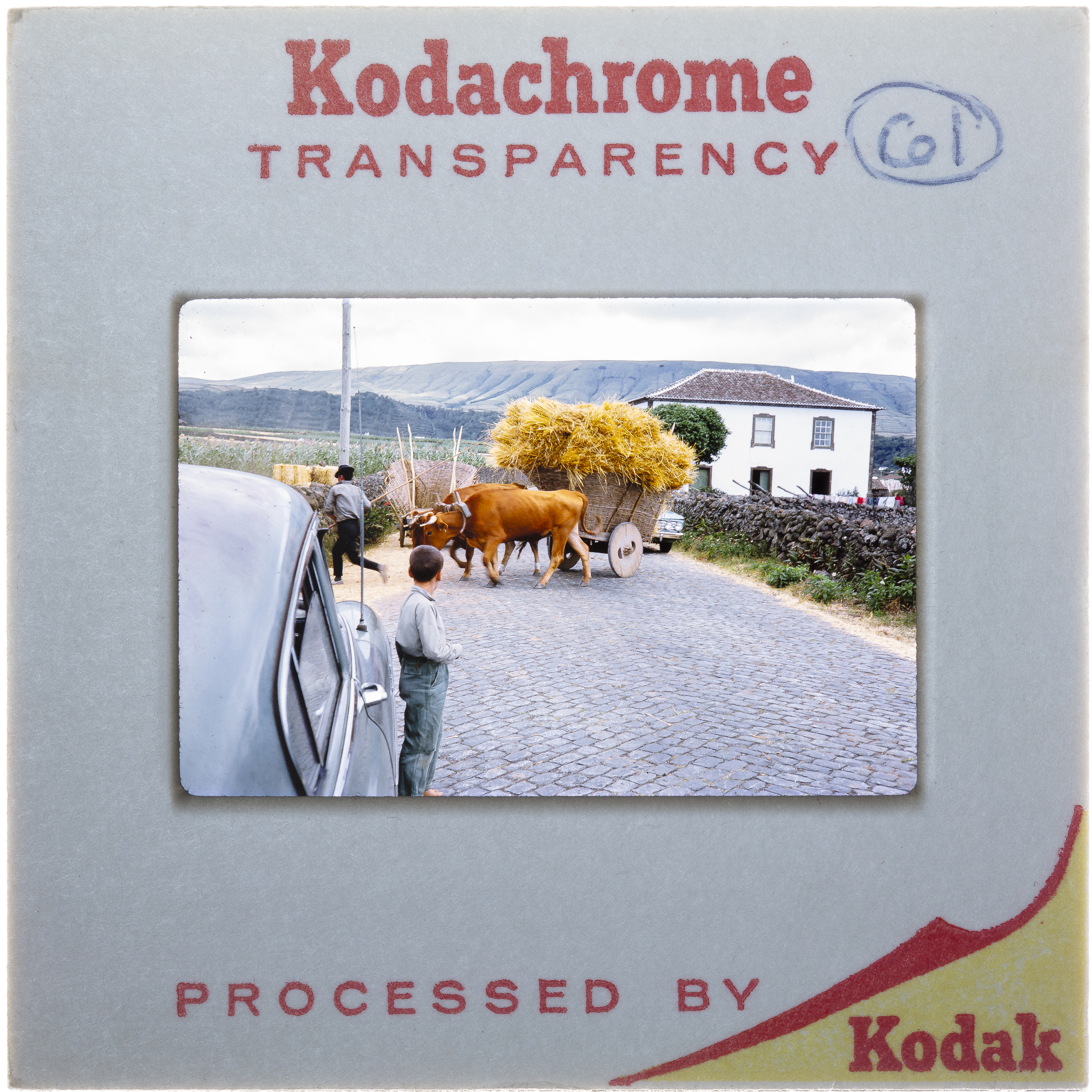
A frame of Kodachrome film, mounted by Kodak in 1961.

=== Archival stability ===
When stored in darkness, Kodachrome's long-term stability under suitable conditions is superior to other types of color film of the same era. While existing Kodachrome materials from before Kodak simplified the development process in 1938 are almost always faded, images on Kodachrome slides and motion picture films made after this point retain accurate color and density to this day. It has been calculated that the yellow dye, the least stable, would suffer a 20% loss of dye in 185 years. This is because developed Kodachrome does not retain unused color couplers. Nevertheless, Kodachrome's color stability under bright light, for example during projection, is inferior to substantive slide films. Kodachrome's fade time under projection is about one hour, compared to Fujichrome's two and a half hours.

Unprocessed Kodachrome film may survive long periods between exposure and processing. In one case, several rolls were exposed and then lost in a Canadian forest. Upon discovery 19 years later they were processed and the images were usable.

=== Digital scanning and resolution ===
A 35mm Kodachrome transparency, like other 35mm transparencies on films of comparable ISO rating, contains an equivalent of approximately 20 megapixels of data in the 24 mm x 36 mm image. Scanning Kodachrome transparencies can be problematic because of the film's tendency to scan with a blue color cast. Some software producers deliver special Kodachrome color profiles with their software to avoid this. An IT8 calibration with a special Kodachrome calibration target is necessary for accurate color reproduction.

Many scanners use an additional infrared channel to detect defects, as the long wave infrared radiation passes through the film but not through dust particles. Dust, scratches, and fingerprints on the slide are typically detected and removed by a scanner's software. Kodachrome interacts with this infrared channel in two ways. The absorption of the cyan dye extends into the near infrared region, making this layer opaque to infrared radiation. Kodachrome also has a pronounced relief image that can affect the infrared channel. These effects can sometimes cause a slight loss of sharpness in the scanned image when Digital ICE or a similar infrared channel dust removal function is used.

== Processing ==
A typical plastic 35mm Kodachrome slide from the 1990s showing logo and text on the reverse side

Kodachrome, and other non-substantive films, unlike most color films, required complex processing that could not practicably be carried out by amateurs. The process underwent four significant alterations since its inception. The final version of the process, designated K-14, was introduced in 1974. The process was complex and exacting, requiring technicians with extensive chemistry training and large, complex machinery. This is because most color films contain dye couplers in the film itself; during development, the couplers react with the developer to form the dyes that form the final image. Kodachrome film has no such couplers; instead the dyes are formed on the film by a complex processing sequence that required four different developers; one black and white developer, and three color developers. Normal color film requires just one color developer. Also, processing Kodachrome film requires 8 or more tanks of processing chemicals, each of which must be precisely controlled for concentration, temperature and agitation, resulting in very complex processing equipment with precise chemical control, no small feat for small processing companies.

The first step in the process was the removal of the antihalation backing with an alkaline solution and wash. The film was then developed using a developer containing phenidone and hydroquinone, which formed three superimposed negative images, one for each primary color. After the first developer was washed out, the film underwent re-exposure and redevelopment. Re-exposure fogged the silver halides that were not developed in the first developer, limiting development to one layer at a time. A color developer then developed the fogged image, and its exhaustion products reacted with a color coupler to form a dye in the color complementary to the layer's sensitivity. The red-sensitive layer was re-exposed through the base of the film with red light, then redeveloped forming cyan dye. The blue-sensitive layer was re-exposed through the emulsion side of the film with blue light, then redeveloped forming yellow dye. The green-sensitive layer was redeveloped with a developer that chemically fogged it and formed magenta dye. After color development, the metallic silver was converted to silver halide using a bleach solution. The film was then fixed, making these silver halides soluble and leaving only the final dye image. The final steps were to wash the film to remove residual chemicals that might cause deterioration of the dye image, then to dry, cut, and mount the film in slide frames.

=== Prepaid processing ===
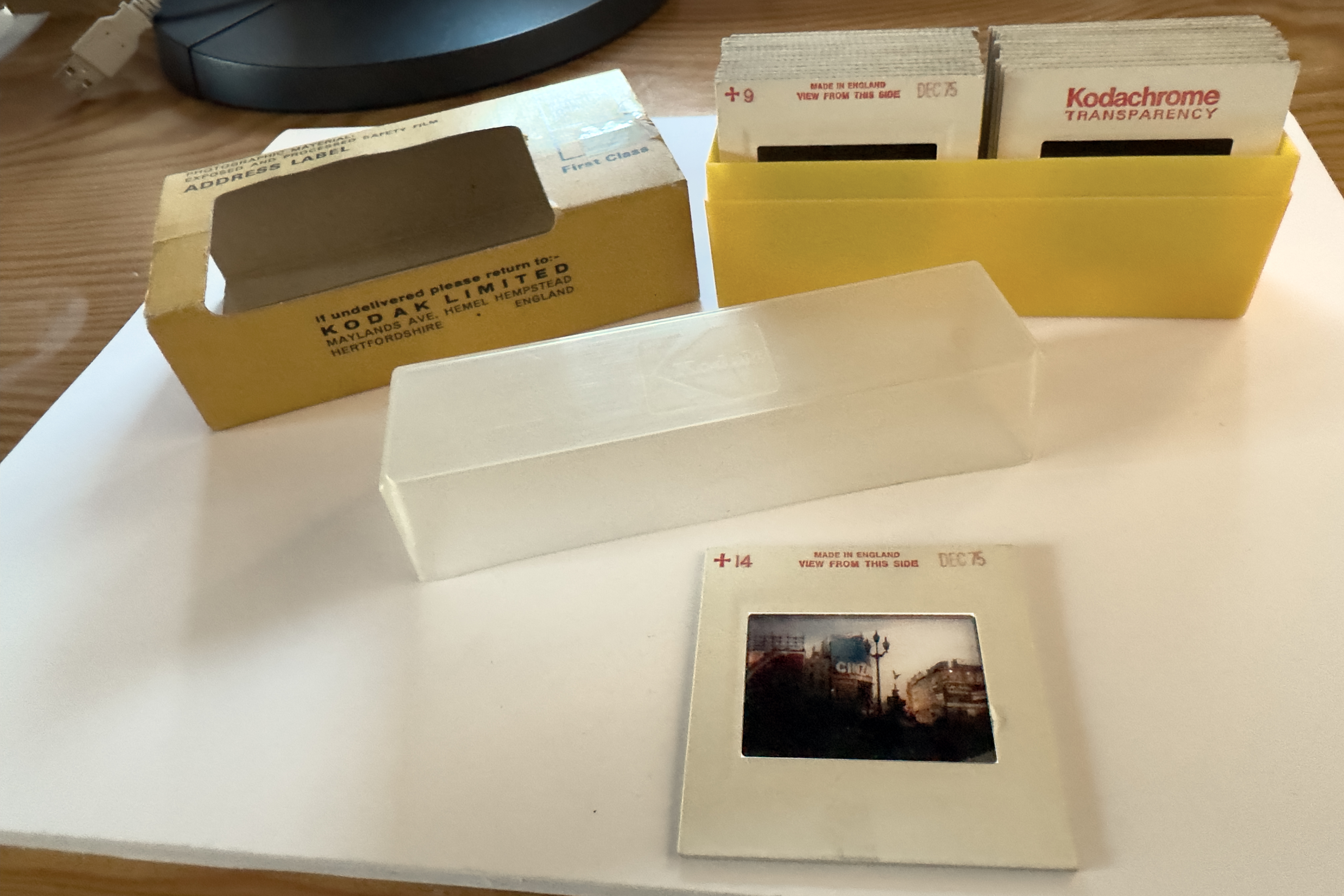
Kodak box for classic Kodak cardboard frames for 35 mm slides (Year 1975)

Due to its complex processing requirements, Kodachrome film was initially sold at a price that included processing by Kodak. An envelope was included with the film in which the photographer would send the exposed film to the nearest of several designated Kodak laboratories. The film was processed, mounted in 2 in × 2 in (51 mm × 51 mm) cardboard mounts in the case of 35 mm slides, and returned by mail to the sender. After 1954, as a result of a lawsuit from the federal government, this practice was prohibited in the United States as anticompetitive. Kodak entered into a consent decree that ended this practice in the United States, and allowed independent processing laboratories to acquire the chemicals needed to process Kodachrome films. In other countries, the price of Kodachrome film continued to include processing by Kodak.

== Decline ==
The use of transparency film declined in the 1980s and 1990s, which, combined with competition from Fuji's Velvia slide film, caused a drop in Kodachrome sales. Some business analysts speculated that heavy subsidies by the Japanese government propped up Fuji and may have even allowed dumping of Fuji's films at below the cost to manufacture them. Kodachrome products were gradually discontinued and on June 22, 2009, Kodak announced that the remaining film, Kodachrome 64, would no longer be manufactured.

Because of the decline in business, many Kodak-owned and independent Kodachrome processing facilities were closed. The loss of processing availability further accelerated the decline in Kodachrome sales. In 1999, Kodak attempted to increase the availability of K-14 processing through its K-Lab program, where small labs equipped with smaller Kodak processing machines would supplement Kodak's own processing services. This effort did not endure and all the K-labs were closed by 2005.

On July 25, 2006, extensive documentation about Kodak's Lausanne Kodachrome lab's impending closure was sent to the European Parliament by the Dutch office of the European Parliament because, although located in Switzerland, the facility served all of Europe and its closure would affect European photographers. The Parliamentary committees for Culture and Education and for Internal Market and Consumer Protection studied the matter.

=== Cessation of processing ===
After its Lausanne processing facility closed, Kodak subcontracted the processing work to Dwayne's Photo, an independent facility in the United States, which became the world's last Kodachrome processing facility. Dwayne's processing of 35 mm films was fully endorsed by Kodak, but its Super-8 process was not endorsed because it required more agitation. Films sent for processing in the USA were mailed directly to Dwayne's, while those in Europe were sent to the Lausanne facility's address and forwarded to Dwayne's.

Dwayne's Photo announced in late 2010 that it would process all Kodachrome rolls received at the lab by December 30, 2010, after which processing would cease. As Dwayne's final processing deadline approached, thousands of stored rolls of film were sent in for processing. Once film received by the deadline had been developed, the world's last K-14 processing machine was taken out of service. The final roll to be processed was exposed by Dwayne Steinle, owner of Dwayne's Photo. The cessation of processing by Dwayne's Photo is commemorated in the book Kodachrome – End of the Run: Photographs from the Final Batches, edited by photographers Bill Barrett and Susan Hacker Stang with introductory essays by Time magazine worldwide pictures editor Arnold Drapkin and Dwayne's Photo vice president Grant Steinle. The book presents a year of pictures shot by Webster University photography students on more than 100 rolls of by-then rare Kodachrome film and processed by Dwayne's on the last day (extended to January 18, 2011) before processing chemicals officially ceased production. Kodachrome film can no longer be processed in color, but it can be cross-processed in black and white by some labs that specialize in obsolete processes and old film processing.

=== Discontinuation ===
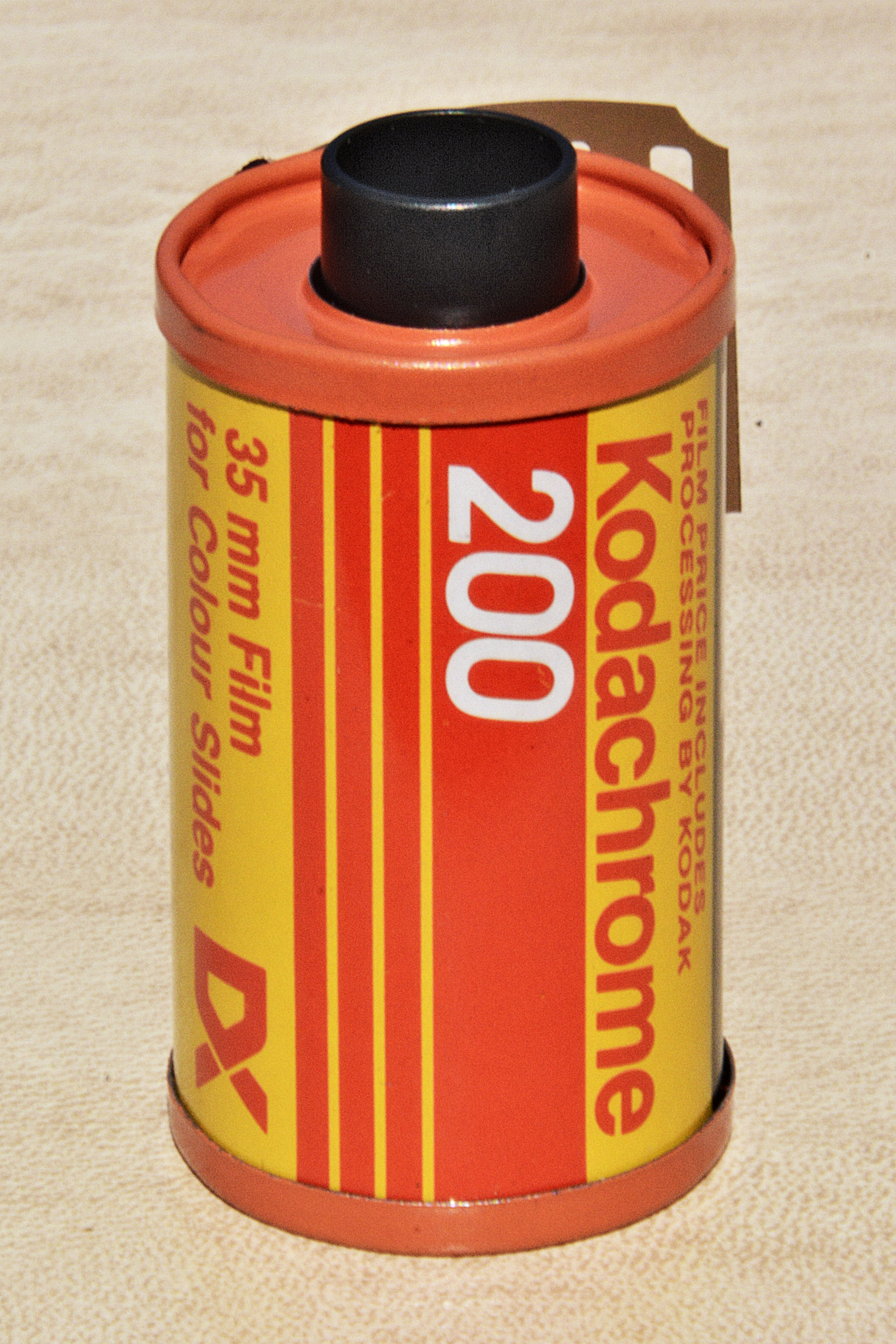
Kodachrome 200 – Film for color slides

The Kodachrome product range diminished progressively through the 1990s and 2000s.

- Kodachrome 64 film in 120 format was discontinued in 1996.
- Kodachrome 25 was discontinued in 2002.
- Kodachrome 40 in the Super 8 movie format was discontinued in June 2005, despite protests from filmmakers. Kodak launched a replacement color reversal film in the Super 8 format, Ektachrome 64T, which uses the common E-6 processing chemistry.
- Kodachrome 200 was discontinued in November 2006.
- Kodachrome 64 and Kodachrome 64 Professional 135 format were discontinued in June 2009.

== Product timeline ==
Film		Date
Kodachrome film	16 mm, daylight (ASA 10) & Type A (ASA 16)	1935–1962
Kodachrome film	8 mm, daylight (ASA 10) & Type A (ASA 16)	1936–1962
Kodachrome film	35 mm and 828, daylight (ASA 10) & Type A (ASA 16)	1936–1962
Kodachrome Professional film (sheets)	daylight (ASA 8) and Type B (ASA 10)	1938–1951
K-11 process
Kodachrome film	35 mm and 828, Type F (ASA 12)	1955–1962
Kodachrome Professional film	35 mm, Type A (ASA 16)	1956–1962
Kodak Color Print Material	Type D (slide duping film)	1955–1957
K-12 process
Kodachrome II film	16 mm, daylight (ASA 25) and Type A (ASA 40)	1961–1974
Kodachrome II film	8 mm, daylight (ASA 25) and Type A (ASA 40)	1961–1974
Kodachrome II film	S-8, Type A (ASA 40)	1965–1974
Kodachrome II film	35 mm and 828, daylight (ASA 25/early) (ASA 64/late)	1961–1974
Kodachrome II film	Professional, 35 mm, Type A (ASA 40)	1962–1978
Kodachrome-X film	35 mm (ASA 64)	1962–1974
Kodachrome-X film	126 format	1963–1974
Kodachrome-X film	110 format	1972–1974
K-14 process
Kodachrome 25 film	35 mm, daylight	1974–2001
Kodachrome 25 film	Movie film, 16 mm, daylight	1974–2002
Kodachrome 25 film	Movie film, 8 mm, daylight	1974–1992
Kodachrome 25 film	Professional film, 35 mm, daylight	1983–1999
Kodachrome 40 film	35 mm, Type A	1978–1997
Kodachrome 40 film	Movie film, 16 mm, Type A	1974–2006
Kodachrome 40 film	Movie film, S-8, Type A	1974–2005
Kodachrome 40 film	Sound Movie film, S-8, Type A	1974–1998
Kodachrome 40 film	Movie film, 8 mm, Type A	1974–1992
Kodachrome 64	35 mm, daylight	1974–2009
Kodachrome 64	126 format, daylight	1974–1993
Kodachrome 64	110 format, daylight	1974–1987
Kodachrome 64	Professional film, 35 mm, daylight	1983–2009
Kodachrome 64	Professional film, daylight, 120 format	1986–1996
Kodachrome 200	Professional film, 35 mm, daylight	1986–2004
Kodachrome 200	35 mm, daylight	1988–2007
Cine-Chrome 40A	Double Regular 8 mm, tungsten	2003–2006

== In popular culture ==
Kodachrome was the subject of Paul Simon's 1973 song "Kodachrome", and Kodachrome Basin State Park in Utah was named after it, becoming the only park named for a brand of film.

The brand is mentioned in The Alan Parsons Project's 1982 song "Psychobabble": "Tell you 'bout a dream that I have every night / It ain't Kodachrome and it isn't black and white".

Anticipating the approval of their merger, in 1985, the Southern Pacific and Santa Fe railroad companies repainted hundreds of locomotives into a unified red and yellow livery, which railfans nicknamed "Kodachrome".

In 2017 the film Kodachrome premiered at the Toronto International Film Festival and featured a dying photographer, played by Ed Harris, whose son, played by Jason Sudeikis, helps him to get the last of his Kodachrome photography processed.

"Dreamland", the opening song to the 2020 album of the same name by Glass Animals, references Kodachrome as part of the song's evocation of a nostalgic past.

Zach Bryan's 2024 single The Way Back makes heavy mention of the film, and was the original title of the song when he first previewed the track in March of 2024.

== See also ==
- 135 film
- Ektachrome
