= 828 film =

Photographic film format

828 is a film format for still photography. Kodak introduced it in 1935, only a year after 135 film. 828 film was introduced with the Kodak Bantam, a consumer-level camera.

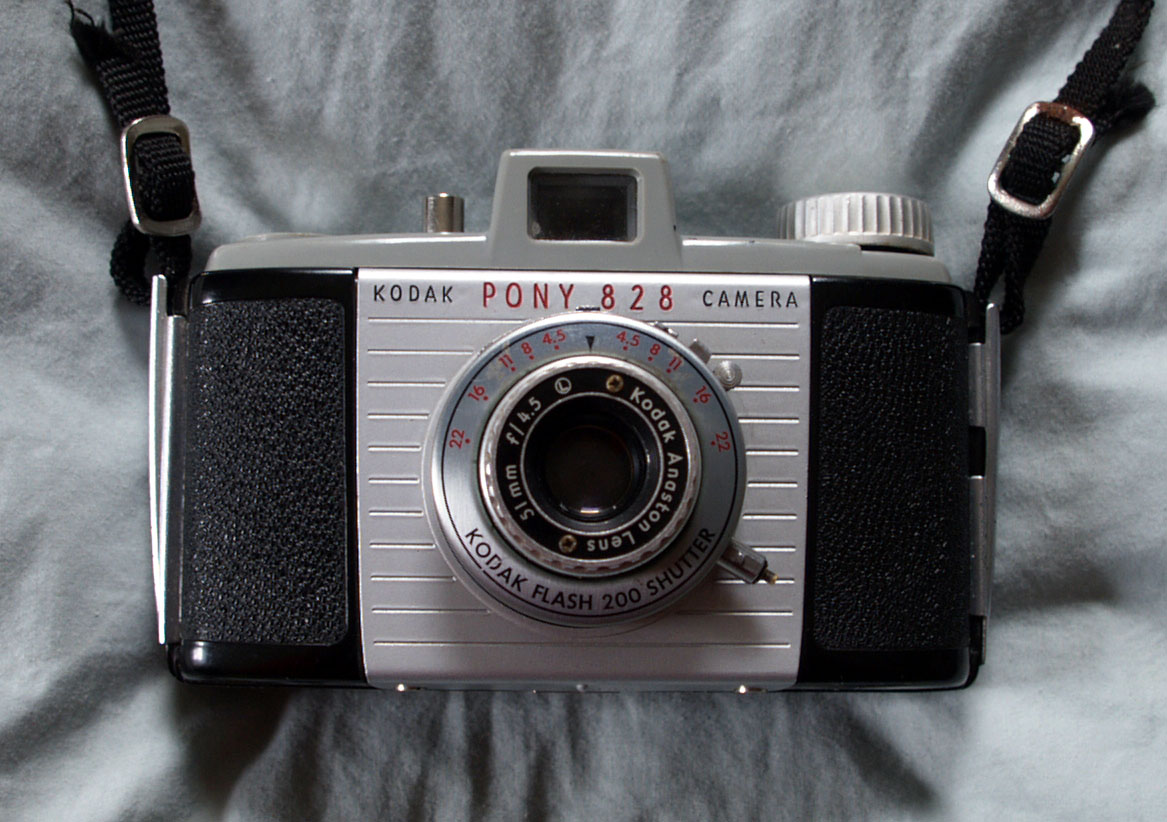
Kodak Pony 828, Kodak's last 828 camera in the US.

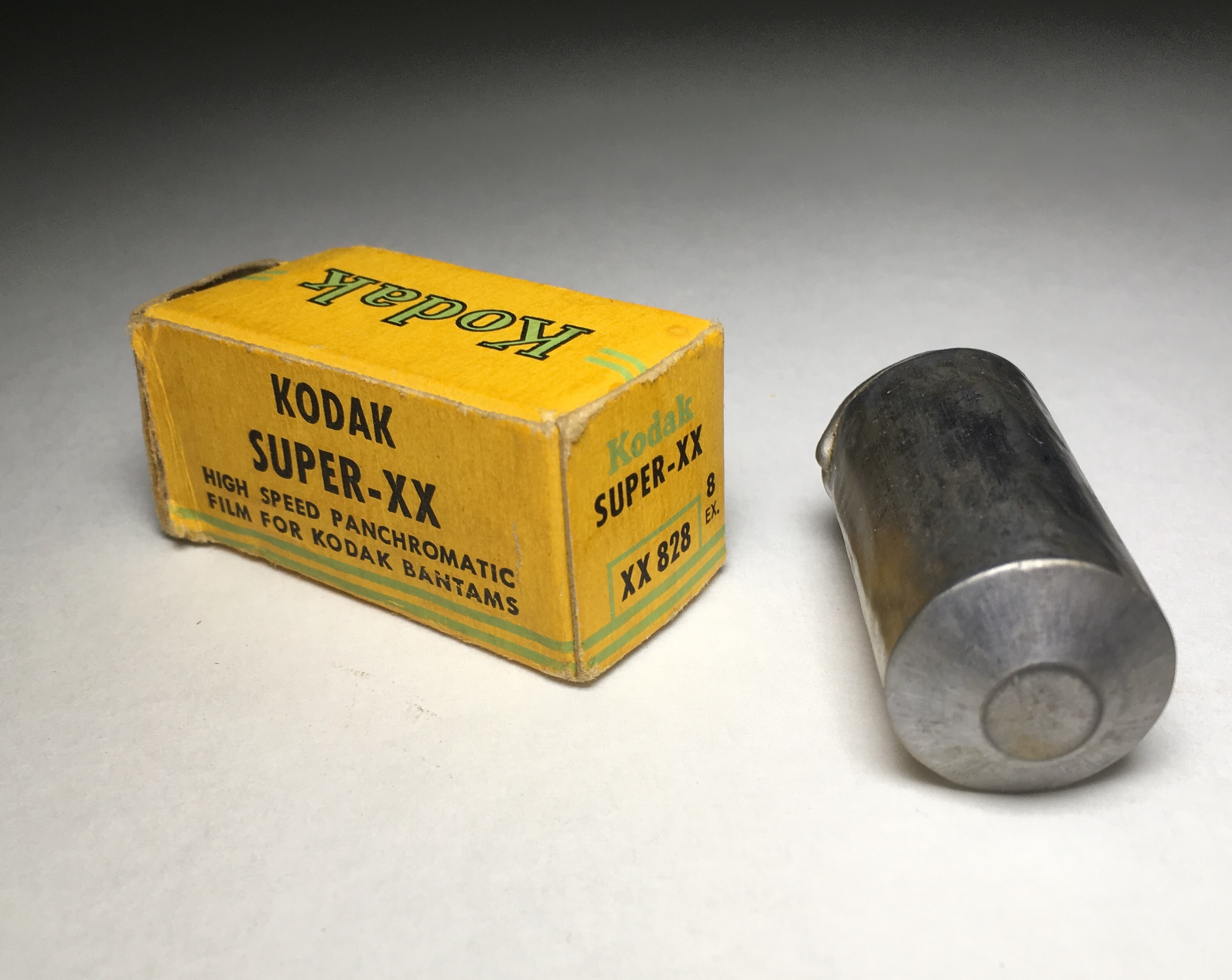
Kodak 828 Film With Tropical Packaging

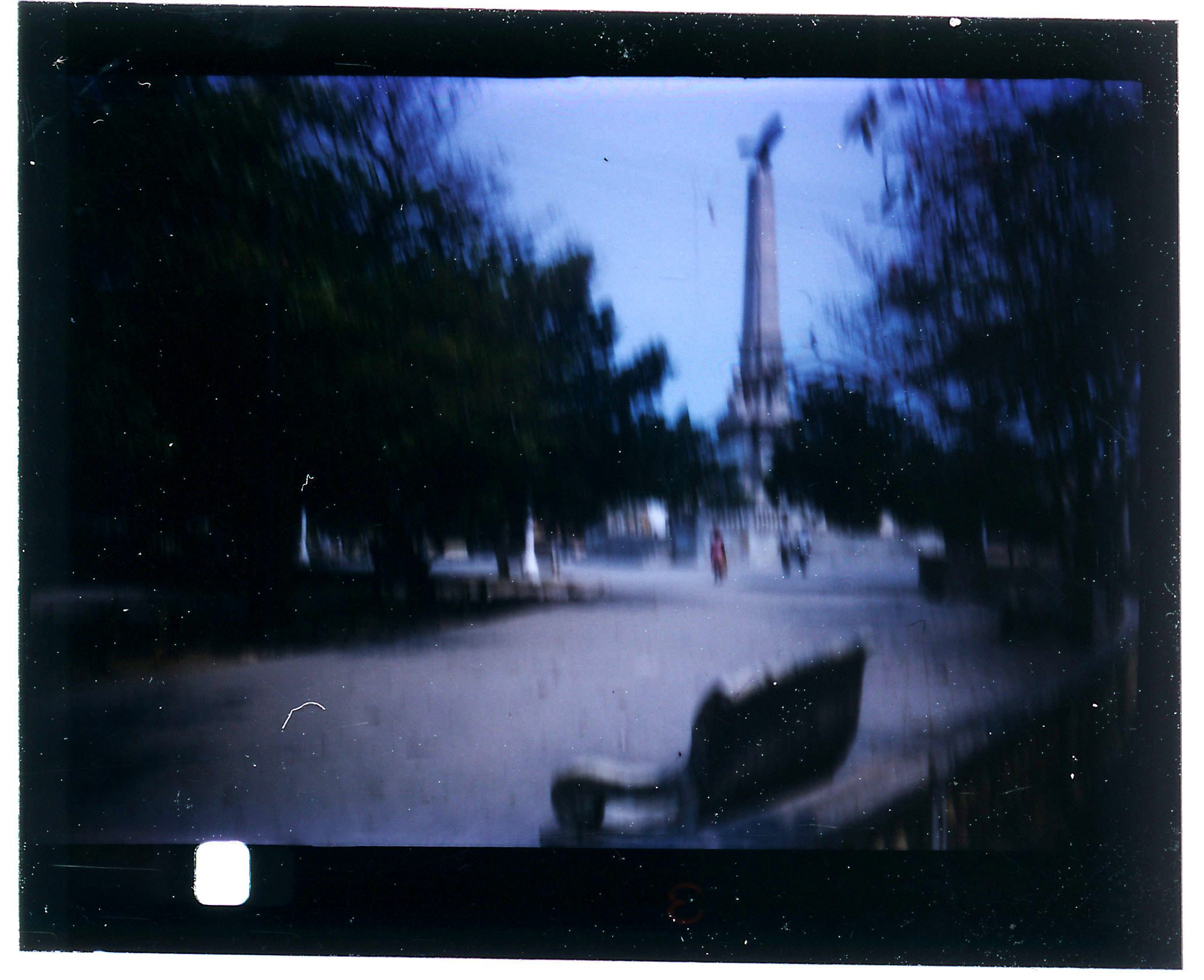
Example frame of 828 format Kodachrome slide film

The 828 format uses the same basic film stock as 135 film (standard 35mm film), but the film lacks the sprocket holes of 135. The standard image format is 40 × 28 mm. This provides a 30% larger image compared to 135's standard 24 × 36 mm, yet on the same film stock. Because Kodak targeted 828 at a lower-end consumer market, the film was much shorter, at a standard 8 exposures per roll. 828 film originally had one perforation per frame, much like 126 film. Unlike 135 (a single-spool cartridge film) or 126 (a dual-spool cartridge film), 828 is a roll film format, like 120 film. Like 120, it has a backing paper and frames are registered through a colored window on the back of the camera (except on the original folding Bantams, where images were registered with an index hole).

828 cameras never achieved widespread popularity, and the format had a rather limited run. Kodak's last 828 cameras were the Pony 828 in the US, produced until 1959, and the Bantam Colorsnap 3 in the UK, produced until 1963. Kodak ceased production of 828 format film in 1985. The Traid Fotron, sold in the late 1960s, used 828 format film as well. However, the film was enclosed in a proprietary pop-in cartridge and so the consumer never actually saw the film; instead, they merely returned the entire cartridge to Traid for processing.

Those wishing to photograph with an 828-format camera have a few options. As of 2005, 828 film is available for purchase on the Internet; this film is probably respooled from bulk unperforated 35mm film. Another option is to use standard 135 film, with sprocket holes, and respool it with used 828 backing paper onto old spools. The effective image size will be reduced with this method as the perforations will intrude on the image area. Finally, as with other obsolete film types, 120 film can be cut (with backing paper) and respooled onto 828 spools.

== See also ==
- Film format
- List of color film systems
- List of photographic film formats
