= Richard Stang =

American academic

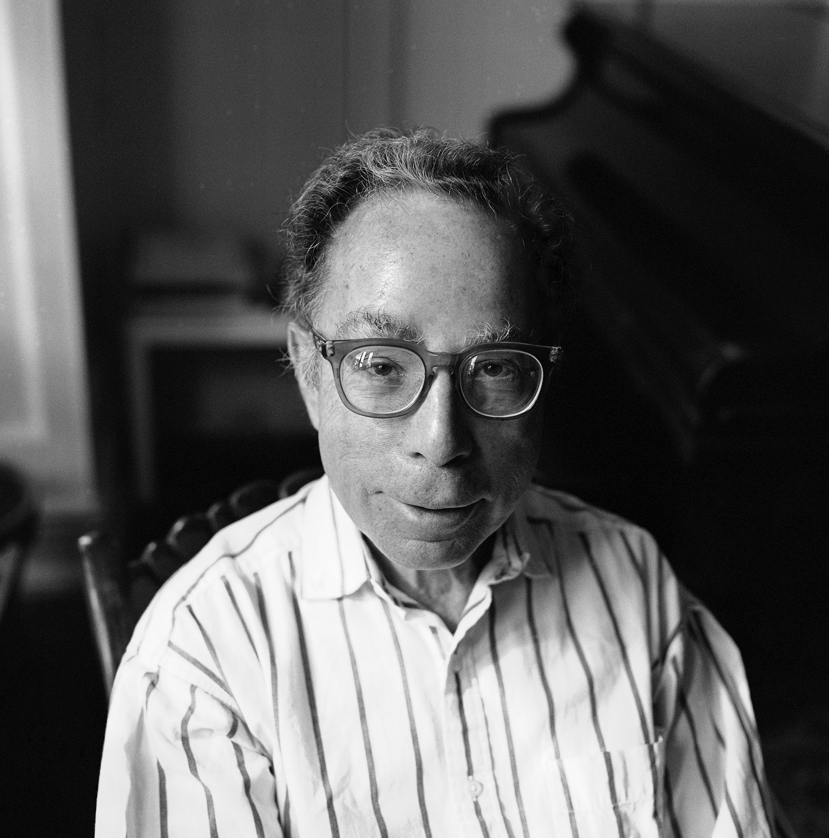
Literary critic, author, and professor Richard Stang, St. Louis, 1994

Richard Stang (July 3, 1925 – December 14, 2011) was an American literary critic, author, scholar, and professor whose groundbreaking insights on the 19th-century English novel have shaped the attitudes of subsequent writers and critics for more than six decades. He was the first critic to recognize and document the sophistication of contemporary mid-Victorian criticism of the novel, and to show that it in effect amounted to a holistic aesthetics of fiction for the English novel in the mid-century.

Published simultaneously in New York and London in 1959, Stang's Theory of the Novel in England 1850–1870, was hailed by Wayne Booth in The Rhetoric of Fiction as "A systematic, impressive study uncovering 'modern' doctrines about fiction in forgotten publications before James." Stang's subsequent books on George Eliot and Ford Madox Ford, along with key articles and essays, further extended his cogent questioning and correcting of widely held critical assumptions about the art of fiction. As a professor of Victorian studies and 19th-century literature at Washington University in St. Louis, where he taught for more than 35 years, Stang was an integral member of a vital literary circle that included novelists and fiction writers Stanley Elkin and William Gass, poets Howard Nemerov, Mona Van Duyn, Donald Finkel, and John Morris, and editor and publisher of Perspective Jarvis Thurston.

== Early years and education ==
Stang was born and grew up in Brooklyn, New York. His parents were Benjamin Stang and Shirley Ducker Stang; his only sibling, his sister Judith, was five years younger. (Stang’s first cousin, the respected character actor Arnold Stang, was also born in Brooklyn, in 1918.) Starting at age 18, Stang served as a rifleman in the 104th Infantry of the U.S. Army during World War II (1943–45) and saw action in Germany. By 1948 he had earned a bachelor's degree in chemistry and biology from Columbia College in New York, then completed a master's degree in romantic literature at Columbia University in 1949. In 1958 he was awarded the Ph.D. in Victorian literature from Columbia University, having studied there under eminent critics Lionel Trilling and Jerome Buckley.

== Theory of the Novel ==
Stang’s The Theory of the Novel in England 1850-1870 is a close look at British fiction in the critical mid-century decades when novelists themselves, along with some critics, were for the first time mounting a defense of the novel as a genre and of the role of the novelist as (in the phrase to be used later by Henry James) a sacred office. This “very full discussion” of the purpose of fiction, the form of the novel, and the technical problems faced by novelists, appeared not as a systematic treatise, Stang demonstrates, but in the pages of the English periodical press. Stang reassembles this mid-Victorian discussion, and puts it in context for the modern reader.

A review by British critic and novelist V. S. Pritchett in The New Statesman found that “Stang makes his point that the period was not a wasteland of criticism, and that the critics were strenuously building the foundations on which Henry James, the supreme theoretician, was able to build.” Before Stang’s book, Pritchett notes, the extent to which Victorian reviewers had formulated a theory of how novels work was largely unknown “because their work is lost in the files of forgotten periodicals.” The novelists focused on by Stang include Bulwer, Thackeray, Charlotte Brontë, Dickens, Charles Reade, Trollope, George Meredith, and George Eliot. Key critics involved in the extended “discussion” were William Caldwell Roscoe, Walter Bagehot, Richard Holt Hutton, Leslie Stephen, G. H. Lewes, and David Masson among others. “Readers will be surprised to discover how much these writers were concerned with the question of the ‘disappearing author,’ or of scenic versus dramatic presentation, or of how often they discussed the point of view from which the experience was presented; [and] most of them objected to the intrusion of the omniscient author,” Irene Simon wrote in a review of Stang’s book in Modern Philology. “The Victorians did indeed have a theory of the novel,” Bruce McCullough wrote in the summer 1960 issue of Criticism. Stang, he finds, “has brought together an important body of criticism.”

== Other studies ==
Other studies by Stang include Discussions of George Eliot, (1960; republished in 2011) a collection of 16 essays by 13 critics which provides a complete history of the critical reception of Eliot’s novels, and Ford Madox Ford: Critical Essays co-edited by Stang and Max Saunders (2002), which assembles more than 70 previously uncollected Ford essays (many of them on the subject of modernism). Important articles by Stang include “The Literary Criticism of George Eliot” in PMLA (1957); “The False Dawn: A Study of the Opening of William Wordsworth’s The Prelude" in ELH (1966); and “Little Dorrit: A World in Reverse” in Dickens the Craftsman, edited by Robert B. Partlow, Jr. (1970).

== Books ==
- Stang, Richard. The Theory of the Novel in England 1850-1870. New York and London: Columbia University Press and Routledge & Kegan Paul, 1959.
- Stang, Richard (editor). Discussions of George Eliot. Boston: D.C. Heath, 1960. Republished in 2011.
- Saunders, Max, and Stang (editors). Ford Madox Ford: Critical Essays. Manchester, England: Carcanet Press, 2002.

== Academic career and later years ==
Stang was an instructor at the University of Washington (1953–54), a lecturer at the City College of New York (1954–58) and an assistant professor at Carleton College (1958–1961) before joining the faculty of the Department of English at Washington University in St. Louis. He served there as associate professor, professor, and professor emeritus for more than 35 years. In 1969-70 he was a special tutor in Victorian Studies at Cambridge University. He was a Fulbright Fellow (1978–79), served on the editorial board of Dickens Studies Annual, and was a reader for PMLA and Nineteenth Century Fiction. Throughout his career he was recognized as a consummate teacher who engaged and challenged his students while instilling in them his passion for literature. He retired in 1997.

He was married to author and Ford Madox Ford scholar Sondra Selvansky Stang from 1946 until her death in 1990. They had three children. In 1992 he married Webster University photographer and educator Susan Hacker Stang. Stang died in St. Louis on December 14, 2011, of pancreatic cancer.

== Bibliography ==
- Booth, Wayne C. The Rhetoric of Fiction. Chicago and London, University of Chicago Press, 1961.
- McCullough, Bruce. “The Theory of the Novel in England: 1850-1870 by Stang.” Criticism (Summer, 1960). pp. 312–314.
- Pritchett, V.S. “Towards the Edifice.” The New Statesman (December 12, 1959). pp. 851–852.
- Simon, Irene. “The Theory of the Novel in England 1850-1870 by Stang.” Modern Philology Vol. 58, No. 1 (August 1960). pp. 62–64.
- Stang, Richard. The Theory of the Novel in England 1850-1870. New York and London: Columbia University Press and Routledge & Kegan Paul, 1959.
