= Susan Hacker Stang =

American photographer

Susan Hacker Stang (born Susan Hacker, October 19, 1949) is an American photographer, author, and educator.

Stang served on the faculty of communications at Webster University in St. Louis from 1974 through 2015 and now holds the title Professor Emeritus. She helped found and build the respected photography program there, heading it for most of her tenure at the university. Her work has been collected by more than 25 major museums and libraries around the world and appears in half a dozen books and numerous magazines.

Much of her photography involves the innovative use of alternative cameras, formats, techniques, and media, as evidenced by her two books Encountering Florence (featuring subtly surreal black and white prints of the Italian city using 8 x 10 Polaroid emulsion transfers) and Kodachrome – End of the Run: Photographs from the Final Batches (which chronicles a six-month university photography project in which students and staff would shoot more than 100 rolls of rare Kodachrome film for processing on the last day of operations by the world's last remaining Kodachrome processing lab.) In 2016, she published a book of photographs, reAPPEARANCES, which is a sequence of fifty-two photographs made with a digital toy camera (the JOCO VX5). The volume purports to take the viewer on a visual journey through the uncanny coherence of the look of the world, according to Stang's introductory essay.

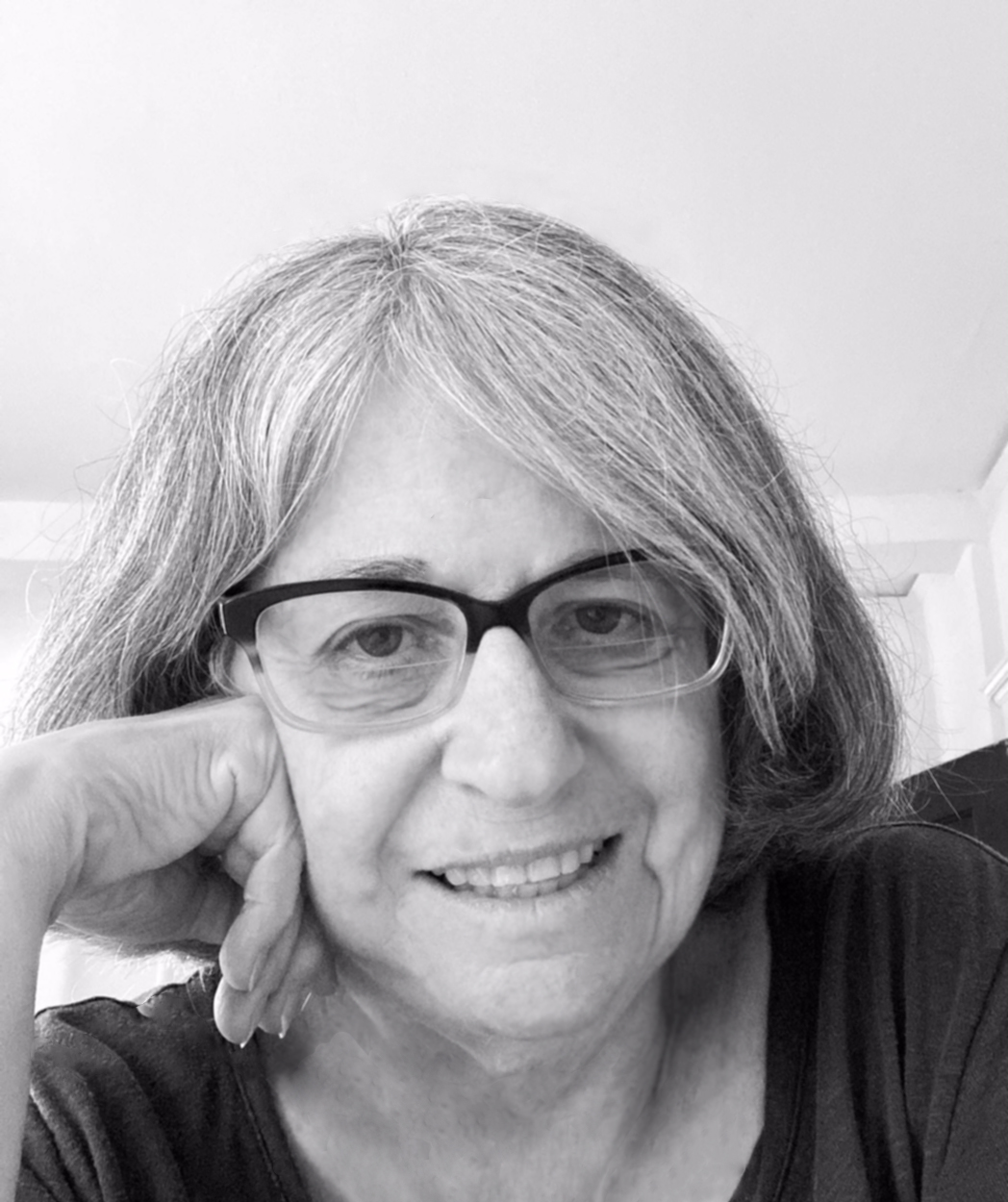
American photographer Susan Hacker Stang in a self-portrait, August, 2020.

== Professional and academic career ==
Stang majored in photography at the Rhode Island School of Design, where she earned both a BFA (1971) and MFA (1974).

In 1971 she moved to London where she worked as a photographer for the British fashion magazine NOVA (published 1965–1975). She joined the faculty of Webster University in St. Louis in 1974. She taught at Webster for 41 years and earned the Kemper Award for Excellence in Teaching.

In addition to her work as head of the Webster University photography program and professor of communications, she has taught summer photography workshops in Florence, Italy at the Santa Reparata International School of Art (SRISA).

== Accomplishments as a photographer and educator ==
=== Images of Florence ===
Stang's photography characteristically employs alternative cameras (such as the Olympus Pen-FT half-frame camera, the Kodak Brownie, and the Holga), or alternative formats (such as Polaroid emulsion transfers) and techniques. Her book of Polaroid emulsion transfers, Encountering Florence was published simultaneously in the U.S. and in Italy (under the title Firenze un Incontro) in 2007. Stang's use of the emulsion transfer process involves transferring the fragile, fabric-like emulsion layer of the photograph (bearing the image) to another surface, subtly transforming the original image in a variety of ways. The results were described in Photo Review as giving Stang's portraits of Florence's buildings, streets, statuary, and gardens "a delicate, draping quality ... reminiscent of the fabrics draped on the ancient statues within the images". An Italian reviewer observed that the photographic process presents "a city not previously seen and perhaps a little disquieting". The book's bi-lingual text in English and Italian was selected and edited by Stang and by Andrea Burzi and Susanna Sarti, both of Florence, to present accompanying word-portraits from authors in their own encounters with the city. A portfolio of Stang's work for the book is held by the Rare Books Collection of the Biblioteca Nazionale Centrale Firenze.

=== On Kodachrome's Last Day ===
In 2010–11, Stang led the Webster University photography program in a six-month-long focus on the color reproduction qualities of Kodachrome film (long revered by professional and amateur photographer for its true, lush color rendition qualities) to mark the permanent discontinuing of the film's production by Kodak. The project ultimately turned into a book documenting the final demise of the medium, and the last day of Kodachrome production anywhere in the world (at Dwayne's Photo in Parsons, Kansas, on January 18, 2011).

Edited by Stang and fellow photographer Bill Barrett, Kodachrome: End of the Run presents a selection of four-score Kodachrome images shot on more than 100 roles of the film by Webster University students, faculty, and staff over a five-month period and processed by Dwayne's in the final hours as the last processing chemicals ran out. The book includes essays by Stang, Time Magazine worldwide pictures editor Arnold Drapkin, and Dwayne's Photo vice president Grant Steinle.

=== Other work ===
Stang's work is also found in museums and library collections, including the Bibliothèque Nationale, Paris; the High Museum of Art, Atlanta; the California Museum of Photography, Riverside; the Saint Louis Art Museum, the Southeast Museum of Photography; and the Portland Museum of Art.

Her photographs have been published in a number of books and magazines, including Exploring Color Photography, second edition (1993), Jerusalem As She Is (1991), The Visionary Pinhole (1985), Between Twelve and Twenty (1982), Creative Camera International Yearbook (1977), and Women See Woman (1976), Hatzilum Magazine, Israel (July 1979), the British Journal of Photography, London (April 1972), and NOVA (1971–1972 issues).

== Books ==
- Stang, Susan Hacker. Encountering Florence (St. Louis, Webster University Press, 2007).
- Stang, Susan Hacker. Firenze un Incontro (Rome: Palombi Editori, 2007).
- Stang, Susan Hacker and Bill Barrett (editors). Kodachrome – End of the Run: Photographs from the Final Batches (St. Louis: Webster University Press, 2011).
- Stang, Susan Hacker. reAPPEARANCES. (St. Louis, 2016).

== Personal life ==
Stang grew up in Wilkes-Barre, Pennsylvania. Her parents were Morris Hacker and Hannah Wruble Hacker. Her sister, Paula Hacker Boutemy, lives in Paris, France. Stang moved to St. Louis, Missouri, in 1974. In 1992, she married author, literary critic and educator, Richard Stang; they remained married until his death on December 14, 2011.

In 2023, Stang relocated to Norwalk, Connecticut.
