= Anti-halation backing =

Layer in photographic film

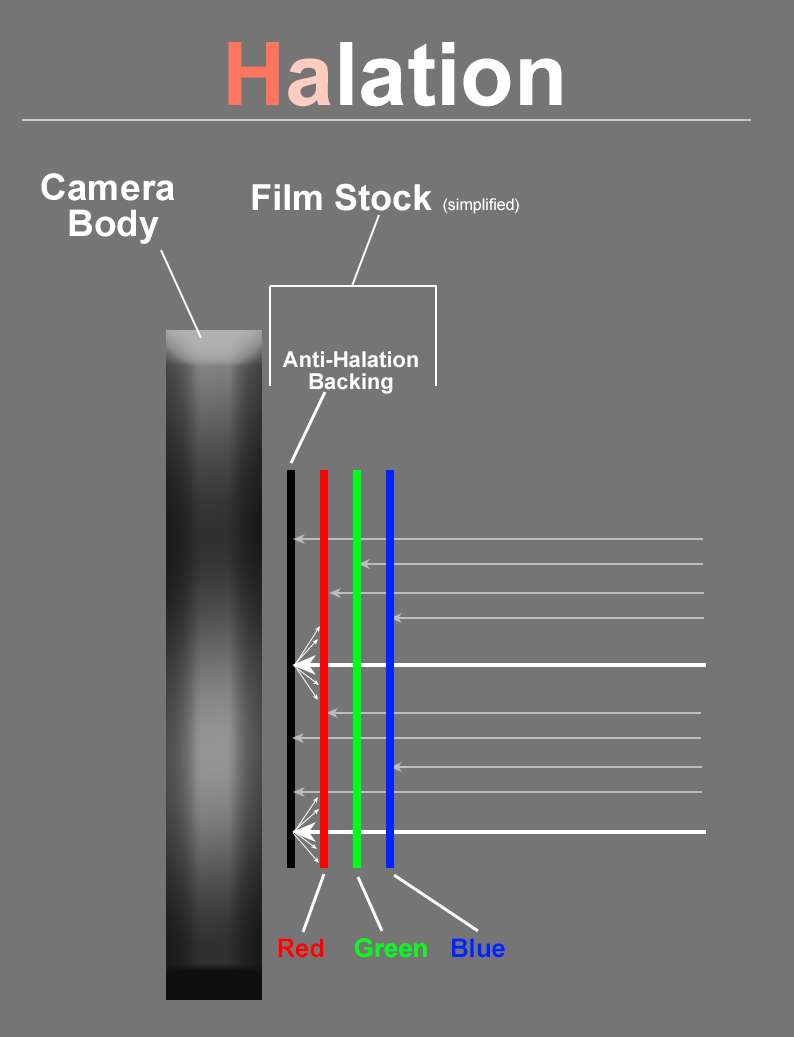
Anatomy of the halation effect: the incoming light penetrates the blue, green, and red layers of the film stock (in that order), then are typically absorbed by the anti-halation backing. The strongest rays are not completely absorbed, and bounce back into the red layer and create halation.

An anti-halation backing is a layer found in many photographic films—and almost all film intended for motion picture cameras—usually a coating on the back of the film base, though it is sometimes incorporated between the light-sensitive emulsion and the base. Its purpose is to absorb light that passes through the emulsion, thus preventing any light from being reflected back through the emulsion from the rear surface of the base, or from anything behind the film, such as the pressure plate of the camera. This prevents a halo-like effect (halation) from forming around bright points or edges in the image.

Still cameras, which handle less film and thus contend with less wear, typically hold their film in the gate with components painted or treated to be black, so reflections are less of an issue and few still films made use of anti-halation backings. The notable exception was Kodak's Kodachrome, which incorporated such a backing to aid with a very sensitive innermost layer.

The anti-halation layer is rendered transparent or washed out during processing of the film, for example, the K-14 process for Kodachrome still film and the Eastman Color Negative (ECN2) process for color motion picture film both have steps which remove this layer.

The lack of an anti-halation layer in Kodak High-Speed Infrared (HIE) film causes the ethereal "glowing" effect often associated with infrared photography, rather than an artifact of IR itself.

== Motion pictures ==
This effect is particularly pronounced in motion picture cameras. These cameras are subject to the constant motion of film being dragged through the film gate, so most motion picture cameras have film movements made or plated with wear-resistant alloys such as hard chrome. Given such a relatively reflective pressure plate behind the film, many motion picture films use an anti-halation (and anti-static) backing. Different kinds of effects can be achieved by removing the anti-halation backing. Halation is one of the properties unique to analog film stock and isn't found in digital footage unless modified in post-production. Despite anti-halation backing, most film stock still renders a slight red halo around the brightest elements in a picture, where the incoming light is so strong that it cannot fully be absorbed by the anti-halation backing, and instead is scattered back into the red layer of the stock, creating additional, halo-like exposure in that particular layer, before it gets fully absorbed.

Halation can be digitally imitated to some degree, as shown below:

Digital "halation" before and after, to illustrate what an image looks like without and with halation
