= Kodachrome (film) =

2017 film

- Film poster
- Directed by: Mark Raso
- Written by: Jonathan Tropper
- Based on: "For Kodachrome Fans, Road Ends at Photo Lab in Kansas" by A.G. Sulzberger
- Produced by: Ellen Goldsmith-Vein; Eric Robinson; Jonathan Tropper; Shawn Levy; Dan Levine; Leon Clarence
- Starring: Ed Harris; Jason Sudeikis; Elizabeth Olsen; Bruce Greenwood; Wendy Crewson; Dennis Haysbert
- Cinematography: Alan Poon
- Edited by: Geoff Ashenhurst
- Music by: Agatha Kaspar
- Production companies: 21 Laps Entertainment; Gotham Group; Motion Picture Capital
- Distributed by: Netflix
- Release dates: September 8, 2017 (TIFF); April 20, 2018 (United States)
- Running time: 100 minutes
- Country: United States
- Language: English
- Box office: $70,149

Kodachrome is a 2017 American comedy-drama film directed by Mark Raso and written by Jonathan Tropper, based on a 2010 New York Times article by A.G. Sulzberger. It stars Ed Harris, Jason Sudeikis, Elizabeth Olsen, Bruce Greenwood, Wendy Crewson, and Dennis Haysbert. The film had its world premiere at the 2017 Toronto International Film Festival on September 8, 2017, and was released on April 20, 2018, by Netflix.

== Plot ==
In late 2010, Matt Ryder is an A&R representative at a Manhattan record label who is in danger of losing his job after his company's biggest client signs with another label. But upon the claim that he is about to have a "sit down" with a band his company would like to sign, Matt is given two weeks to redeem himself.

He is estranged from his father Ben, a famous photographer, for years. Ben's assistant and nurse Zooey informs Matt that Ben is terminally ill with liver cancer. Though they have not spoken in over ten years, Ben has requested that Matt drive him to Dwayne's Photo in Parsons, Kansas, the last shop that develops Kodachrome film. Ben has several rolls he wants to have processed before he dies, and time is short, as even Dwayne's Photo will soon stop operating because Kodak is no longer making the dyes. Ben's manager Larry persuades a very reluctant and resistant Matt to make the trip by arranging a meeting between Matt and the Spare Sevens, the band Matt's company would like to sign.

Matt, Ben and Zooey start the journey, and Ben insists on taking backroads so he can take photos and enjoy the scenery. In Ohio, the group visits Ben's brother, Dean, and Dean's wife, Sarah, who were Matt's surrogate parents following his mother's death. Zooey and Matt bond over Matt's old music collection, and later a drunk Matt leans in to kiss her, but falls off the bed. He sleeps on the floor, and they share stories of their failed marriages. The next morning, Zooey is awakened by Ben, who has fallen in the bathroom and needs help to stand. Ben irritates Dean and Sarah at breakfast by mentioning that he and Sarah once had a sexual relationship. Sarah explains that it was before she and Dean dated, which does little to assuage Dean's anger.

In Chicago, Matt makes his pitch to the Spare Sevens, and after making little headway, then follows his father's advice to refrain from telling the band how great they are, but to instead point out what they are doing wrong and why they need Matt to fix it. Lead singer Jasper and the other members admire Matt's nerve and begin to agree to the outlines of a deal. However, when Ben accidentally urinates on himself, the members of the band begin to mock Ben, and though it will probably cost him his job, Matt tells them he does not respect them and leaves the meeting to check on his father.

At their hotel, Ben expresses disappointment that Matt did not close the deal. Zooey points out that Matt made a career-ending decision to defend his father, which leads to Ben firing her (although she tells Matt a few minutes later than he regularly fires her). Zooey joins Matt at a bar, where he receives several texts from his boss confirming that he has been fired. They continue to drink, then spend the night together. The next morning, Zooey says she regrets spending the night with Matt and returns to New York.

Going to his father's room so they can continue the journey, Matt receives no answer at Ben's door and has hotel staff open it. Ben is unconscious on the floor, and Matt rushes him to the hospital. The doctor tells Matt that Ben's cancer can no longer be treated, he cannot travel, and he should be placed in hospice care. That night, Ben struggles to load film into a camera, eliciting Matt's help. Through tears, Ben tells Matt of holding him as a young child and the promises he made to him, and how somehow that all went wrong. He says that he does not expect Matt to forgive him for his shortcomings as a father, but that he does love him. Matt and Ben embrace.

Matt sneaks Ben out of the hospital to finish the trip to Parsons, Kansas, which will require driving nonstop overnight to make it to the photo lab in time. They drop off Ben's film at Dwayne's, where Ben is recognized and shown great respect by several patrons, most of whom are well-known photographers, giving Matt insight into his father's influence and legacy.

In their hotel room, Ben is cleaning his camera when he dies. Larry arrives to make funeral arrangements and Dwayne delivers the developed photos. Matt offers them to Larry, but Larry refuses, saying Ben's wish was for Matt to curate them for a showing.

Upon returning home, Matt enters Ben's home and loads the photo slides into a projector. He is surprised to see dozens of pictures of himself as a boy, many with his deceased mother, and some with his father, making it clear that although Ben was not a good father or faithful husband, he deeply treasured his family, and that his photographs were his way of expressing that love. As he is watching the slides, Zooey quietly arrives and asks if he would like company, then they stand together, her head on his shoulder, as they continue to view Ben's slides.

In the credits, a number of memorable photographs are displayed alongside some of the film credits.

== Cast ==
- Ed Harris as Benjamin Asher Ryder, a famous photographer, Matt's father, Dean's brother and Zooey's employer
- Jason Sudeikis as Matt Ryder, Ben's estranged son, Dean and Sarah's nephew and a record label A&R representative
- Elizabeth Olsen as Zooey Kern, Ben's nurse and assistant
- Bruce Greenwood as Dean Ryder, Ben's younger brother, Sarah's husband and Matt's uncle
- Wendy Crewson as Sarah Ryder, Dean's wife and Matt's aunt
- Dennis Haysbert as Larry Holdt, Ben's manager
- Gethin Anthony as Jasper, the lead singer of the Spare Sevens
- Bill Lake as Dwayne, a film developer
- Rob Stewart as Lepselter, Matt's boss at Spitting Devil Records.
- Al Mukadam as Leo
- Sebastian Pigott as Elijah, a singer who leaves Matt's label

== Production ==
The film is based on the December 29, 2010 New York Times article "For Kodachrome Fans, Road Ends at Photo Lab in Kansas", by A.G. Sulzberger. Filming began in Toronto on August 28, 2016. Filming also took place in Shelburne, Ontario, which was used to portray Parsons, Kansas. Cinematographer Alan Poon shot the film on Kodak 35 mm film.

== Release ==
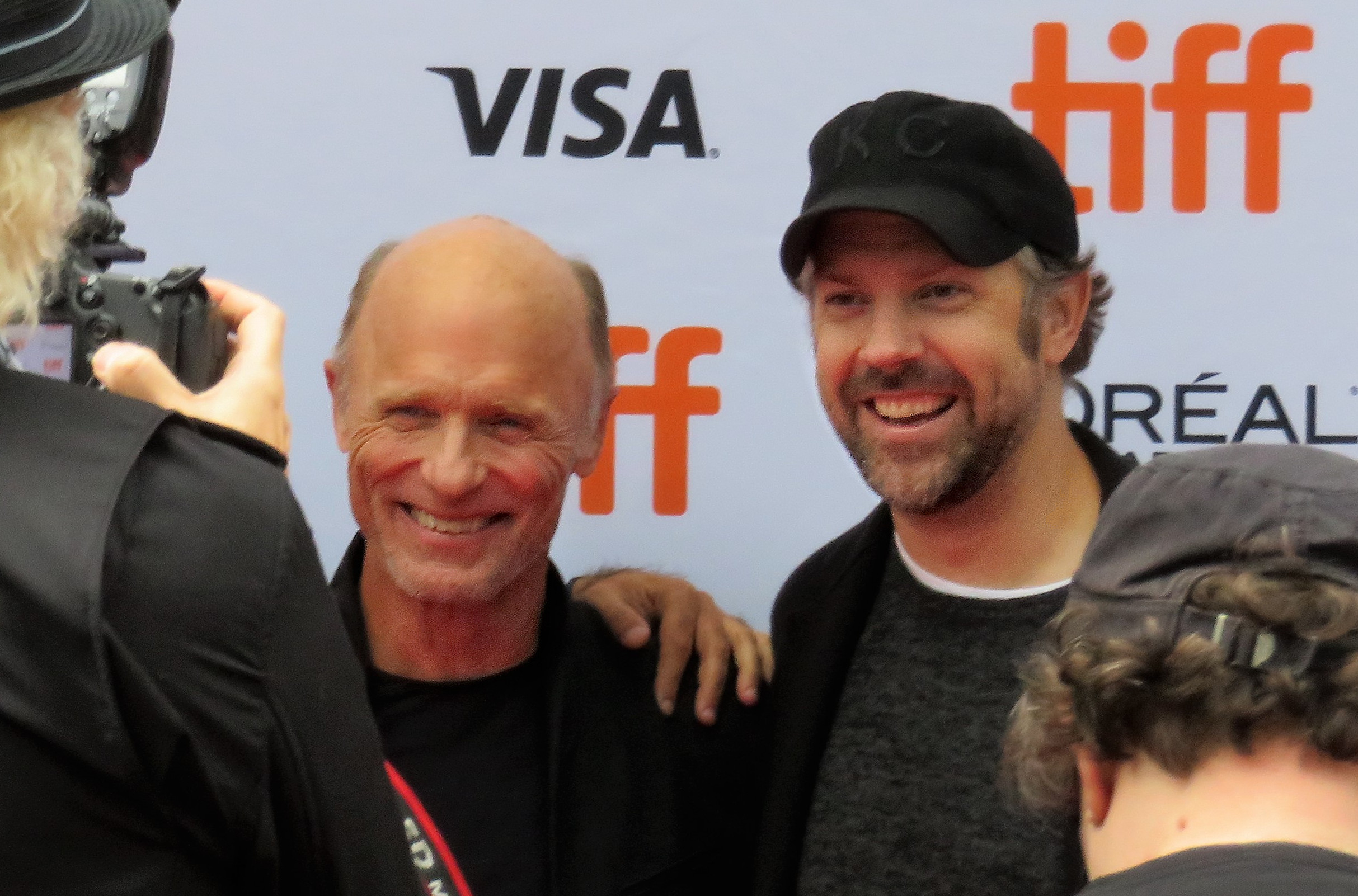
Harris and Sudeikis at premiere (2017)

Kodachrome premiered at the 2017 Toronto International Film Festival on September 8, 2017. Shortly after, Netflix acquired the film's distribution rights in North America, the United Kingdom, Ireland, Italy, the Benelux, Japan, India, Norway, Denmark, Finland, Sweden and Iceland for $4 million. The film was released on April 20, 2018.

=== Critical reception ===
On review aggregator website Rotten Tomatoes, the film holds an approval rating of 71% based on 49 reviews, with a weighted average of 6.24/10. The website's critical consensus reads, "Kodachrome gains richer hues due to Ed Harris' colorful performance, which is enough to enliven a solid if predictable father-son road trip drama." On Metacritic, the film has a weighted average score of 57 out of 100, based on 17 critics, indicating "mixed or average" reviews.
