= Fotron =

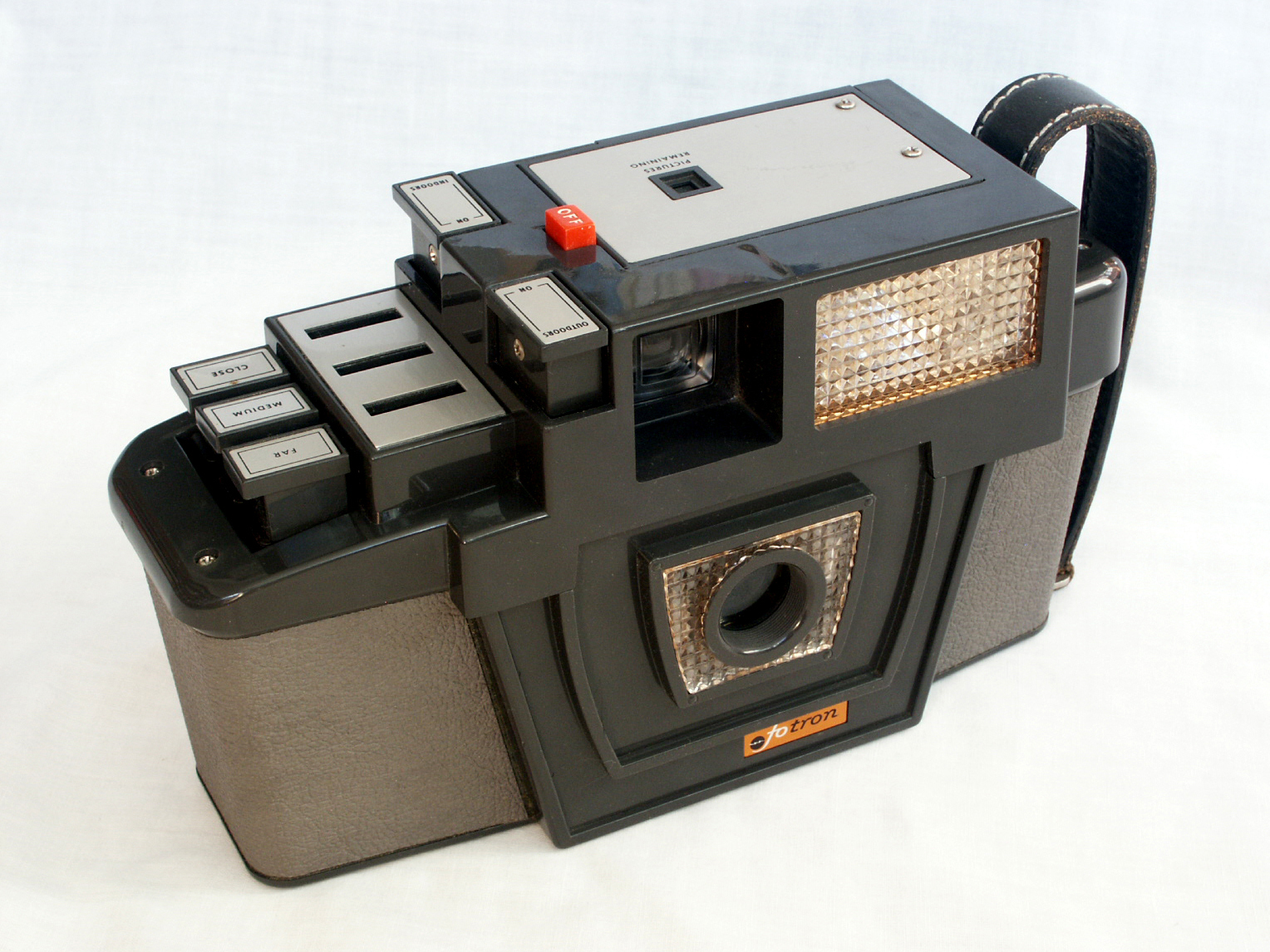
The original Fotron, introduced in 1962

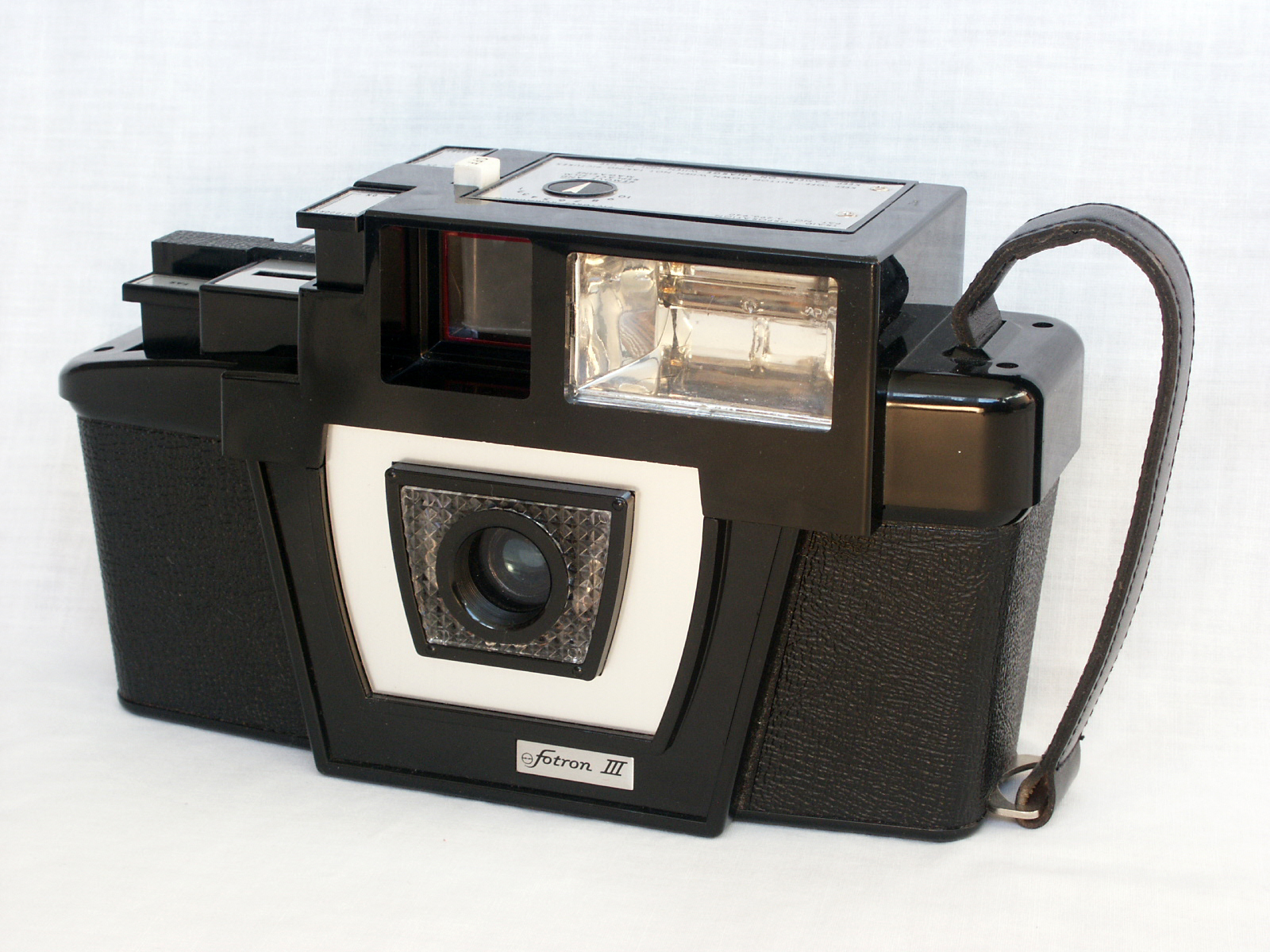
The later Fotron III

The Fotron was a camera produced by the Traid Corporation of Glendale, California between 1962 and 1971 and mainly sold door to door. It had a highly unorthodox design and boasted several firsts for a consumer camera, including a built-in electronic flash, built-in motor drive, and drop-in film loading (beating Kodak's popular Instamatic to the market). Other unusual features included push-button exposure and focus controls and an integrated rechargeable battery. The camera used standard 828 rollfilm packaged in a proprietary snap-in cartridge which had to be returned to the company for processing. It was aimed mainly at women, marketed as a "goof-proof" alternative to traditional cameras.

Although innovative, the Fotron was also extremely expensive, unwieldy, and reportedly suffered from poor optical quality. Introduced at a list price of $139.95, by 1971 the camera was selling for $520 (equivalent to $4,134 in 2025), plus $3.98 per 10-exposure roll for film and processing (equivalent to $32 in 2025). Despite this, Traid claimed the cameras were sold at a loss and only the film processing operation was able to turn a profit. Due to the high price, vendor lock-in of film and processing, and aggressive direct selling techniques used to market the camera, it is often regarded as something of a scam. Traid faced multiple class-action lawsuits brought by Fotron customers and stopped selling the camera in 1971.

== Design ==
The Fotron was a large and heavy camera, similar in size to a folded Polaroid Land Camera of the same era. Much of the bulk came from the built-in flash unit and rechargeable battery. Exposure was set by pushing one of two buttons, marked "indoors" and "outdoors" respectively. This also served to turn on the flash circuitry in preparation for taking a picture. The exposure would then be made by choosing from a second set of buttons, labeled with various camera-to-subject distances. This would set the focus accordingly and then trip the shutter and the flash, which fired with every exposure. The film would then be automatically advanced to the next frame.

== Models ==
Traid produced three Fotron models, all of which were essentially the same. The original model was simply marked "Fotron" and had a gray plastic housing. The second model, introduced around 1965, had a black housing and a different style of frame counter. The final model was the Fotron III, which was introduced around 1966. It was also black and had a slightly simplified design with two focus buttons instead of three and a different exterior treatment for the flash unit.

== Fraud allegations ==
The Fotron was the subject of a class-action suit filed against the Traid Corporation in 1972. The plaintiffs alleged that the Fotron cameras they had purchased were sold for over ten times their actual value and that Traid had misrepresented the product both implicitly and in writing. The outcome of this case is uncertain.
