= Dwayne's Photo =

Film processing facility in Parsons, Kansas

Coordinates: 37°20′12.69″N 95°17′10.36″W

- Industry: Film processing
- Founded: 1956
- Headquarters: Parsons, Kansas, United States
- Area served: Worldwide
- Key people: Dwayne Steinle (founder)
- Number of employees: ~60 (2010)
- Website: www.dwaynesphoto.com

Dwayne's Photo is a film processing facility in Parsons, Kansas founded in 1956. It processes film, slides and certain movie films, and offers photo services.

Dwayne's Photo was the last Kodak certified Kodachrome processing facility in the world, which stopped accepting rolls of Kodachrome on December 30, 2010, citing Kodak's discontinuation of the necessary developing chemicals.

== History ==
The company was founded in 1956 by Dwayne Steinle as a small film processing facility, but it quickly expanded to become one of the leading photo processors in the United States. When the use of 8 mm film and its successor Super 8 declined rapidly in the 1980s, most facilities closed down. Dwayne's, and some other labs, process a variety of film types, like 126 film, that are no longer manufactured.

Between 2000 and 2010, the business was affected by the decline in income because of widespread migration to digital photography, and by 2010 it had reduced its staffing levels from 200 to about 60. By that date, digital sales accounted for half the company's revenue.

=== Kodachrome ===
Dwayne's Photo announced that it would continue processing Kodachrome film, which was no longer manufactured by Kodak, until the end of December 2010. The last roll was processed on January 18, 2011. On July 14, 2010, Dwayne's announced that the final roll of Kodachrome manufactured by Kodak was developed for Steve McCurry. The 36 slides will be housed at George Eastman House in Rochester, New York. The last roll of Kodachrome film to be developed was exposed by owner Dwayne Steinle with the last exposed frame being a group shot of the Dwayne's Photo employees. Based upon the 2010 New York Times article about this event, in 2017 Mark Raso directed the film Kodachrome.

The last days of Kodachrome color processing by Dwayne’s Photo are depicted in the book Kodachrome – End of the Run: Photographs from the Final Batches, edited by Bill Barrett and Susan Hacker Stang. The book includes a year of pictures shot by Webster University photography students on more than 100 rolls of Kodachrome film and processed by Dwayne's on the last day it was processing it, January 18, 2011, before processing chemicals were used up.
