= Parsons (surname) =

Parsons is an English surname. The name has an occupational meaning, and refers to a parson's servant or a person who worked in the parson's house. Another meaning of the surname is the parson's son.

Notable people with the surname of Parsons include the following.

== Academia and science ==
- Charles Algernon Parsons (1854–1931), English marine engineer, inventor of the steam turbine
- Charles Parsons (philosopher) (1933–2024), American philosopher
- Coleman Parsons (1905–1991), American professor of literature
- Elsie Clews Parsons (1875–1941), American anthropologist, sociologist, folklorist, and feminist
- Frederick Gymer Parsons (1863–1943), English writer and scientist
- John Herbert Parsons (1863–1957), British ophthalmologist
- Peter J. Parsons (1936–2022), British classicist and papyrologist
- Talcott Parsons (1902–1979), American sociologist best known for his social action theory and structural functionalism
- Terence Parsons (1939–2022), American philosopher
- Theophilus Parsons (1749–1813), American jurist
- Torrence Parsons (1941–1987), American mathematician

== Art ==
- Alfred Parsons (artist) (1847–1920), English illustrator, landscape painter, garden designer
- Beatrice Emma Parsons (1870–1955), English garden painter
- Betty Parsons (1900–1982), American artist and art dealer
- Elizabeth Parsons (1831–1897), English-Australian artist
- Eunice Parsons (1916–2024), American modernist artist
- Peter J. Parsons (1936–2022), British classicist and papyrologist

== Performing arts ==
- Agnes Parsons (1884–1970), American screenwriter
- Andy Parsons (born 1966), English comedian
- Charlie Parsons (born 1958), British television producer
- Christopher Parsons (1932–2002), English filmmaker and producer
- Estelle Parsons (born 1927), Academy Award-winning actress
- Jim Parsons (born 1973), American television and film actor
- Kane Parsons (born 2005), American web series maker and film director, known for making Backrooms and directed it's movie.
- Karyn Parsons (born 1966), American film and television actress
- Nancy Parsons (1942–2001), American actress
- Nathan Parsons (born 1988), Australian-American actor
- Nicholas Parsons (1923–2020), English actor and radio and television presenter
- Percy Parsons (1878–1944), American actor
- Philip Parsons, Australian drama academic and publisher
- Rodger Parsons, American voice actor

== Military and diplomacy ==
- Alfred Parsons (diplomat) (1925–2010), Australian diplomat
- Sir Anthony Parsons (1922–1996), British diplomat, ambassador to Iran and to the United Nations
- Edwin Charles Parsons (1892–1968), American aviator for several militaries
- Francis Newton Parsons, British soldier, awarded the Victoria Cross
- Harold Parsons (1863–1925), British Army officer, for whom Parsons Barracks named
- Isaac Parsons (American military officer) (1814–1862), Virginia military officer and Virginia House Delegate
- James Russell Parsons (1861–1905), American educator and diplomat
- Mosby Parsons (1822–1865), U.S. officer in the Mexican–American War

== Music ==
- Alan Parsons (born 1948), British musician and record producer
- Dave Parsons (born 1966), English bass guitarist
- Gene Parsons (born 1944), American musician
- Geoffrey Parsons (lyricist) (1910–1987), English lyricist
- Geoffrey Parsons (pianist) (1929–1995), Australian classical pianist
- Gram Parsons (1946–1973), American singer, songwriter, guitarist and pianist
- Lynn Parsons, British radio disk jockey
- Robert Parsons (composer) (c. 1535 – 1572), English composer
- Squire Parsons (1948–2025), American gospel singer
- Ted Parsons, American drummer

== Politicians and activists ==
- Albert Parsons (1848–1887), American labor activist, anarchist newspaper editor, and orator
- Andrew Parsons (American politician) (1817–1856), American politician
- Cornelius R. Parsons (1842–1901), New York politician
- Eileene Parsons (1930–2025), British Virgin Islands politician
- Ernie Parsons (born 1946), Canadian JP and politician
- Harold George Parsons (1867–1905), lawyer and politician in Western Australia
- Herbert Parsons (New York politician) (1869–1925), U.S. Representative from New York
- Herbert Angas Parsons (1872–1945), South Australian lawyer, politician and judge
- Isaac Parsons (Virginia politician) (1752–1796), Virginia militia officer and Virginia House Delegate
- Jamie Parsons (1941–2015), Alaskan politician
- John Langdon Parsons (1837–1903), Australian politician
- Lewis E. Parsons (1817–1895), American politician, governor of Alabama
- Lucy Parsons (1853–1942), American labor organizer, radical socialist and anarcho-communist
- Robert E. Parsons (1892–1966), American politician
- Sidney Parsons (1893–1955), Canadian politician
- Silas Parsons (c. 1800–1860), justice of the Supreme Court of Alabama
- S. Titus Parsons (d. 1881), American politician and lawyer
- Thomas Parsons (politician) (1814–1873), New York politician

== Religion ==
- Donald J. Parsons, American Episcopal bishop
- Jonathan Parsons (1705–1776), New England clergyman
- Robert Persons (1546 – 1610), English Jesuit priest, later known as Robert Parsons

== Sports ==
- Benny Parsons (1941–2007), American NASCAR driver
- Bill Parsons (born 1948), American baseball player
- Bob Parsons (American football) (1950–2022), American football player
- Brian Parsons (1933–1999), English cricketer
- Buzz Parsons (born 1950), Canadian soccer player
- Casey Parsons, American Major League baseball player
- Chandler Parsons (born 1988), American basketball player
- Charlie Parsons (baseball) (1863–1936), American baseball player
- David Parsons (cricket coach) (born 1967), English cricket coach
- David Parsons (racing driver) (born 1959), Australian racing driver
- Donald Parsons, businessman and owner of the Pittsburgh Penguins
- Eric Parsons (1923–2011), English footballer
- Geoff Parsons (born 1964), Scottish high jumper
- Herbert Parsons (cricketer) (1875–1937), Australian cricket player for Victoria
- Jake Parsons (born 1994), Australian racing driver
- Jayne Parsons (born 1962), New Zealand paralympic cyclist
- Jim Parsons (rugby union) (1943–2026), English rugby union player
- Johnnie Parsons (1918–1984), American race car driver
- Johnny Parsons (born 1944), American race car driver
- Jordan Parsons (1990−2016) American mixed martial artist
- Keith Parsons (born 1973), English cricketer
- King Parsons (born 1945), American professional wrestler
- Liam Parsons (born 1977), Canadian rower
- Lindsay Parsons (1946–2019), English footballer
- Lucas Parsons (born 1989), Australian professional golfer
- Micah Parsons (born 1999), American football player
- Phil Parsons (born 1957), American NASCAR driver
- Rachel Parsons (born 1997), American figure skater
- Sarah Parsons (born 1987), American ice hockey player
- Sarah Wilhite Parsons (born 1995), American volleyball player
- Tom Parsons (born 1988), Gaelic footballer
- Zane Parsons (born 1976), Australian rules footballer

== Others ==
- Abraham Parsons (died 1785), English commercial consul and traveller
- Alice Beal Parsons (1886–1962), American writer
- Bob Parsons (born 1950), American entrepreneur
- Chick Parsons (1900–1988), American businessman and diplomat
- Clere Parsons (1908–1931), English poet
- Eliza Parsons (1739–1811), English gothic horror writer
- Kathryn Parsons (born 1982), British tech entrepreneur
- Louella Parsons (1881–1972), American gossip columnist
- Martha Parsons (1869–1965), American businesswoman
- Mary Elizabeth Parsons (1859–1947), American author
- Randy Parsons (born 1965), American luthier
- Rehtaeh Parsons (1995–2013), bullycide victim
- Samuel Parsons (1844–1923), American landscape architect
- Samuel Holden Parsons (1737–1789), American lawyer

== Fictional characters ==
- Ellen Parsons, one of the main characters in the TV series Damages
- Kimberly Parsons (portrayed by Daniella Evangelista]), a character from the movie Cabin by the Lake and its sequel "Return to Cabin by the Lake"
- Nicky Parsons (portrayed by Julia Stiles), a character from the Bourne (film series)
- Rachel Parsons, a character from the movie Gothika
- Tom Parsons and his family, characters from Orwell’s Nineteen Eighty-Four

== See also ==
- Parsons (disambiguation)
- Don Parsons (disambiguation), multiple people
- George Parsons (disambiguation), multiple people
- Jack Parsons (disambiguation), multiple people
- John Parsons (disambiguation), multiple people
- Michael Parsons (disambiguation), multiple people
- Richard Parsons (disambiguation), multiple people
- Tom Parsons (disambiguation), multiple people
- Tony Parsons (disambiguation), multiple people
- William Parsons (disambiguation), multiple people
