= Tony Parsons =

Tony or Anthony Parsons may refer to:

- Tony Parsons (presenter) (born 1939), Canadian news anchor
- Tony Parsons (British journalist) (born 1953), novelist and arts critic
- Tony Parsons, TV series character, see list of past Coronation Street characters
- Antony Parsons, 2014 World Snooker Championship
- Anthony Parsons (1922–1996), British diplomat
- Anthony Parsons (musician) (born 1989), English singer-songwriter
- Tony Parsons (Australian author) (born 1931), Australian author
- Killing of Tony Parsons, in Scotland in 2017
