= John Parsons =

John Parsons may refer to:

== Politicians ==
- John Parsons (died 1717) (1639–1717), English MP for Reigate
- John Parsons (1667-c.1706), English MP for Reigate
- John Parsons (Newfoundland politician) (1868–1949), Canadian mariner, merchant and politician
- John Langdon Parsons (1837–1903), Cornish Australian politician
- John M. Parsons (1866–1946), politician in the Senate of Virginia
- John S. Parsons (1836–1911), mayor of Gloucester, Massachusetts

== Sports ==
- John Parsons (jockey), British jockey
- John Parsons (footballer, born 1875) (1875–1960), Anglo-Spanish footballer
- Jack Parsons (cricketer) (1890–1981), English cricketer also known as John Parsons
- John Anthony Parsons (1938–2004), British sports journalist (mainly Tennis) and author
- Johnny Parsons (born 1944), American racecar driver
- John Parsons (footballer, born 1950), Welsh footballer

== Others ==
- John Parsons (organist) (1563–1623), organist at Westminster Abbey
- John Parsons (bishop) (1761–1819), Vice-Chancellor of Oxford University
- John Meeson Parsons (1798–1870), art collector
- John Parsons (missionary) (1817–1869), English missionary and reviser of the Hindi Bible
- John Edward Parsons (1829–1915), lawyer in New York City
- John N. Parsons (1856–1930), American labor union leader
- John Denham Parsons (1861–?), writer
- John Herbert Parsons (1863–1957), English ophthalmologist
- John T. Parsons (1913–2007), pioneer in Numerical control for machine tools
- John Whiteside Parsons (1914–1952), American rocket propulsion researcher and occultist better known as Jack Parsons
- John Parsons (criminal) (born 1971), American FBI Ten Most Wanted fugitive who has been captured
- John Parsons (Inspector General), Inspector General for the Global Fund to Fight AIDS, Tuberculosis and Malaria
- John Parsons (physician) (1742–1785), English physician
- John Robert Parsons (c. 1825–1909), Irish photographer and painter
- Sir John Parsons (accountant), British accountant and courtier
- John Richard Parsons, English writer and artist

== See also ==
- Jack Parsons (disambiguation)
