= Caratacus (disambiguation) =

Caratacus or Caractacus may refer to:

- Caratacus, a British king at the time of the Roman conquest
- Caractacus Pott or Caractacus Potts, the hero of Chitty Chitty Bang Bang
- Caractacus, a racehorse
- a character in Kingsman, see Agent Galahad
