= Parsons =

Parsons may refer to:

== Education ==
- Parsons School of Design, part of The New School, New York City, United States
  - Parsons Paris (2013), Paris school under Parsons School of Design
- Parsons College, a former private college from 1875 to 1973 in Fairfield, Iowa, United States
- Parsons Senior High School, Parsons, Kansas, United States

== Places ==
In the United States:

- Parsons, Kansas, a city
- Parsons, Missouri, an unincorporated community
- Parsons, Tennessee, a city
- Parsons, West Virginia, a town
- Camp Parsons, a Boy Scout camp in the state of Washington
- Lake Parsons, near Parsons, Kansas
- Parsons Field, a multi-purpose stadium in Brookline, Massachusetts
- Parsons Memorial Lodge, Yosemite National Park, California
- Parsons Peak, a mountain in Yosemite National Park
- Lucy Parsons Center, an all-volunteer, nonprofit collectively run radical, independent bookstore and community center, located in Jamaica Plain, Boston, Massachusetts

On the Moon:

- Parsons (crater)

== People ==
- Parsons (surname)
- Parsons Baronets, four baronetcies, two in Ireland, one in England, and one in the United Kingdom

== Companies ==
- CA Parsons & Company, company founded by Charles Parsons to build turbo-generators
- Parsons Corporation, engineering firm headquartered in Centreville, Virginia
- Parsons Dance Company, based in New York City
- Parsons Marine Steam Turbine Company, company founded by Charles Parsons to build marine steam turbines
- WSP Global, formerly Parsons Brinckerhoff, engineering firm headquartered in New York City

== Other uses ==
- USS Parsons (DD-949), a US Navy destroyer
- Parsons code, a system of notation used to identify a musical work
- Parsonsite, a mineral

== See also ==
- Parson (disambiguation)
- Justice Parsons (disambiguation)
