= Jack Parsons (disambiguation) =

Jack Parsons (1914–1952) was an American rocket engineer and occultist.

Jack Parsons may also refer to:

- Jack Parsons (cricketer) (1890–1981), English first class cricketer for Warwickshire County Cricket Club
- Jack Parsons (sociologist) (1920–2006), British sociologist, advocate of population control

== See also ==
- John Parsons (disambiguation)
