= Thomas Parsons =

Thomas Parsons may refer to:

- Thomas Parsons (baseball) (born 1995), American baseball player
- Thomas Parsons (politician) (1814–1873), American politician from New York
- Thomas Parsons (priest), Irish Anglican priest
- Thomas William Parsons (1819–1892), American dentist and poet

== See also ==
- Tom Parsons (disambiguation)
