= George Parsons =

George Parsons may refer to:

- George Parsons (shipbuilder) (died 1812), prolific shipbuilder in Bursledon, Hampshire
- George Parsons (rugby) (1926–2009), Welsh dual-code international rugby union and professional rugby league footballer
- George Parsons (ice hockey) (1914–1998), professional ice hockey player
- George W. Parsons (1850–1933), attorney turned banker during the 19th century Old West
- George Parsons (photographer), (c. 1845–1931), American photographer
- George Parsons (sailor) (1911–1996), Canadian sailor
- George Mesnard Parsons (1890–1963), English brewer
