= Samuel Spode =

British equestrian painter

Samuel Spode (1798–1872) was a British painter best known for his equestrian sporting scenes, specialising in the portraiture of sporting and military horses.

== Biography ==
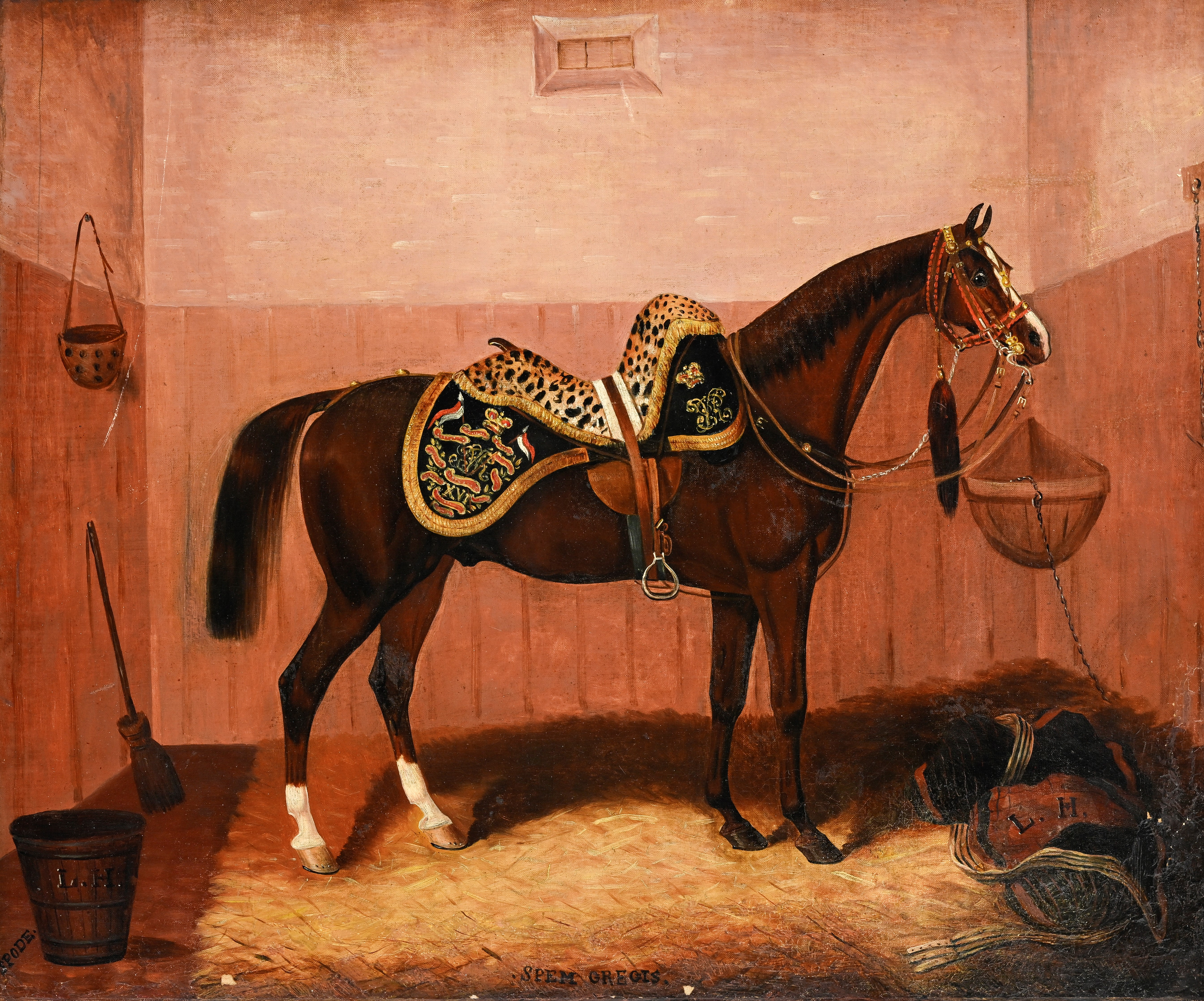
Spem Gregis, in full parade tack in his stable, painted by Samuel Spode.

Little is known about Samuel Spode's life. There are few sources and the information is sparse. Samuel Spode was born 21 April 1798. He was the grandson of Josiah Spode.

=== Marriage and emigration ===
On 6 February 1821, Samuel Spode married Mary Crewe. It was the time, when the British Government encouraged adventurers to emigrate to the penal colony of Van Diemen's Land. And only a few weeks after their marriage, Samuel Spode and his wife, as well as his brother Josiah and his wife Maria Middlemore Garner, took their chance and tried their luck in Van Diemen's Land.

In Van Diemen's Land, Samuel Spode had briefly served as clerk of the colony's Supreme Court, after being trained as a lawyer by his uncle, Thomas Fenton, who was married to Josiah Spode's youngest daughter, Anne.

=== Back in England ===
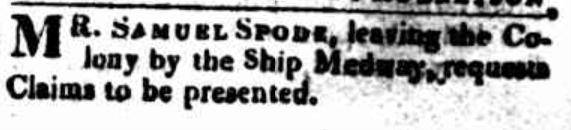
Announcement in The Hobart Town Gazette on 15 April 1826: Samuel Spode is leaving the colony by the ship Medway.

While his brother and his wife remained in Van Diemen's Land, Samuel Spode and his family returned to England in 1826. When they returned to England, they stayed with his sister Sarah and her husband, the potter Charles James Mason (1791–1856), at their house Heron Cottage in the Staffordshire Potteries.

Within a year of their return to England, Spode's wife died. The cause of death may have been Acquired brain injury, which might have been the result of a carriage accident back in Van Diemen's land in April 1825. Spode remarried several times, since by the age of 40, he had been widowed three times.

=== Samuel Spode's passion – painter of famous horses ===
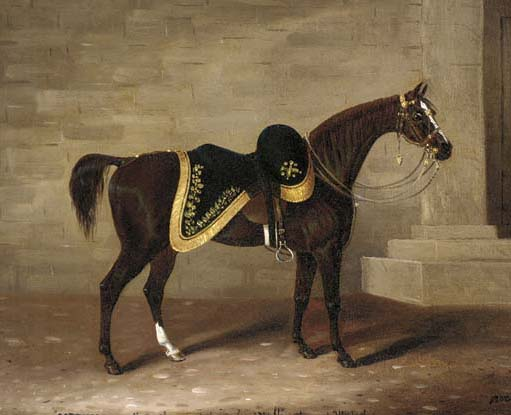
Copenhagen, the Duke of Wellington's war horse, as painted in his retirement by Samuel Spode.

Even though Samuel Spode was able to make a living for a while with his legal training, he preferred to devote his time to painting. Painting was his passion, particularly animal painting, with a focus on horses.

Samuel Spode loved equestrian sports. He painted many horse racing and fox hunting scenes. Spode also painted many famous racehorses, including Birdcatcher, Caractacus and Voltager, winner of both: the Derby and St Leger in 1850. Other prominent horses he portrayed were Copenhagen, the Duke of Wellington's war horse, which he most famously rode at the Battle of Waterloo, and Ronald, the charger, ridden by Lord Cardigan in the Charge of the Light Brigade in 1854.

At around 1845, Spode painted several paintings for patrons with Stonehenge in the background. It can therefore be assumed that he lived briefly at nearby Amesbury. The painting The Pinckney Family Coursing at Stonehenge is regarded as his most famous work from this period.

Sometimes his patrons liked to be included in the paintings too, like John Dawson Duckett of Duckett's Grove and the Earl of Lonsdale. In 1825, two of Samuel Spode's paintings were reproduced and published in The Sporting Magazine.

=== Ireland: On the racecourse, marriage and death ===
In the 1830s, Samuel Spode travelled frequently to Ireland in search of commissions. However, he also worked as a horse trainer at the Curragh Racecourse for some time, as evidenced by a painting by Henry Samuel Alken Jnr (1810–1894), titled and dated S. Spode Training Eastern Bere / 1856.

In 1865, despite still being married to his fourth English wife, he claimed to be a bachelor and married an Irish girl named Delia in Dublin.

Samuel Spode died in Dublin on 31 March 1872, leaving several children by several wives. Despite obviously still being married to the Irish girl, who was granted administration of his meagre estate, his death was registered by a Teresa Spode. Her connection to Samuel Spode has never been defined.

== Legacy ==
Samuel Spode worked solely on commissions. Therefore, he never exhibited at any of the well-known exhibitions. As a result, he has been relatively unknown and unrecognised. However, his legacy is impressive, both in the number of paintings and the famous horses he depicted.

== Further reading (external links) ==
in alphabetical order

- Adam's Auctioneers: Samuel Spode
- Art UK: The Pinckney Family Coursing at Stonehenge, by Samuel Spode
- Blackbrook Gallery: Samuel Spode
- Sotheby's: Samuel Spode – Pembroke, a Thoroughbred Horse
- Sotheby's: Henry Samuel Alken Jnr (1810–1894) – S. Spode Training Eastern Bere
- Spode History: Biography of Samuel Spode by Peter Roden
- Whyte's Auctioneers: Samuel Spode
