= Copenhagen (horse) =

British war horse

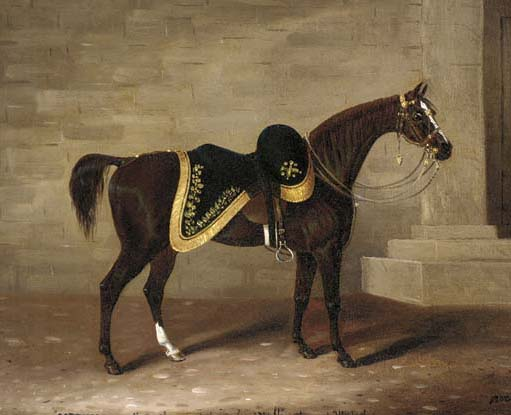
- Copenhagen as painted in his retirement by Samuel Spode.
- Sire: Meteor
- Grandsire: Eclipse
- Dam: Lady Catherine (half-bred)
- Damsire: John Bull
- Sex: Stallion
- Foaled: 1808
- Died: 12 February 1836 (aged 27–28)
- Country: United Kingdom
- Colour: Chestnut
- Breeder: General Grosvenor
- Owner: 1) General Grosvenor; 2) Sir Charles Stewart; 3) Duke of Wellington
- Record: 12: 2-2-7

Honours
- Honoured with a full military funeral upon his passing.

Copenhagen (1808 – 12 February 1836) was the Duke of Wellington's war horse, which he most famously rode at the Battle of Waterloo. Copenhagen was of mixed Thoroughbred and Arabian parentage, with his dam being sired by the Derby winner John Bull and his sire Meteor having finished second in the Derby. Copenhagen was foaled in 1808 and was named in honour of the British victory at the Second Battle of Copenhagen. Copenhagen did race in England for a short period, winning two races and finishing at least third in nine races out of his 12 career starts. Copenhagen was sent to Spain with Sir Charles Stewart in 1813 and was then sold to the Duke of Wellington. Becoming his favourite, Copenhagen was the Duke's mount in the Battle of Waterloo. The horse was retired to the Duke's Stratfield Saye estate and lived there for the remainder of his life, dying on 12 February 1836 at the age of 28 years. His grave site is marked with a marble headstone that stands under a Turkey Oak planted in 1843.

== Background ==
Copenhagen was bred by General Grosvenor, a nephew of the Earl Grosvenor. Copenhagen's sire, Meteor, was second in the 1786 Derby and won several stakes races before he was retired in 1791 to the Earl Grosvenor's stud. Copenhagen was foaled when Meteor was 25 years old, and the stallion died in 1811 when Copenhagen was three years old. Copenhagen's dam, Lady Catherine, was a daughter of the 1792 Epsom Derby winner John Bull and an unnamed mare sired by the Rutland Arabian out of "a hunting mare" that was either "three parts Thoroughbred" or had no Thoroughbred parentage at all. The Rutland Arabian was owned by the Duke of Rutland and had limited success at stud. Lady Catherine ("Lady Katherine" in the Racing Calendar) raced under General (then Colonel) Grosvenor's name as a five-year-old in 1801, and her dam was identified as "Morning Star's dam." In 1810 Lady Catherine foaled a half-sister to Copenhagen, Chantress by Popinjay, and is noted in the stud-book to have been "sent to Ireland." In honour of Copenhagen's notable military service, Lady Catherine is the only "half-bred" mare listed in the General Stud Book.

The circumstances surrounding Copenhagen's birth differ in the sources. General Grosvenor allegedly took Lady Catherine (in foal with Copenhagen) to Denmark to be his mount during the siege of Copenhagen, a campaign that culminated in the Second Battle of Copenhagen. Copenhagen was either foaled after the battle in Copenhagen and named in honour of the British victory or Lady Catherine was returned to England before his birth and Copenhagen was foaled at Eaton Hall in 1808. The General Stud Book entry for his dam does not support the notion that he was foaled overseas.

=== Description ===
Copenhagen stood 15 hands high and had a muscular physique on a small compact frame. When Copenhagen was purchased for the Duke of Wellington as a five-year-old, he was described as "a dark chestnut with two white heels, [he was] a hollow-backed, powerful horse" but reportedly had "bad shoulders." Copenhagen allegedly "never refused his corn" but had an unusual habit of eating while lying down. Wellington said of Copenhagen, "There may have been many faster horses, no doubt many handsomer, but for bottom and endurance I never saw his fellow." His "enduring qualities" were often attributed to his "Arabian blood."

== Racing career ==
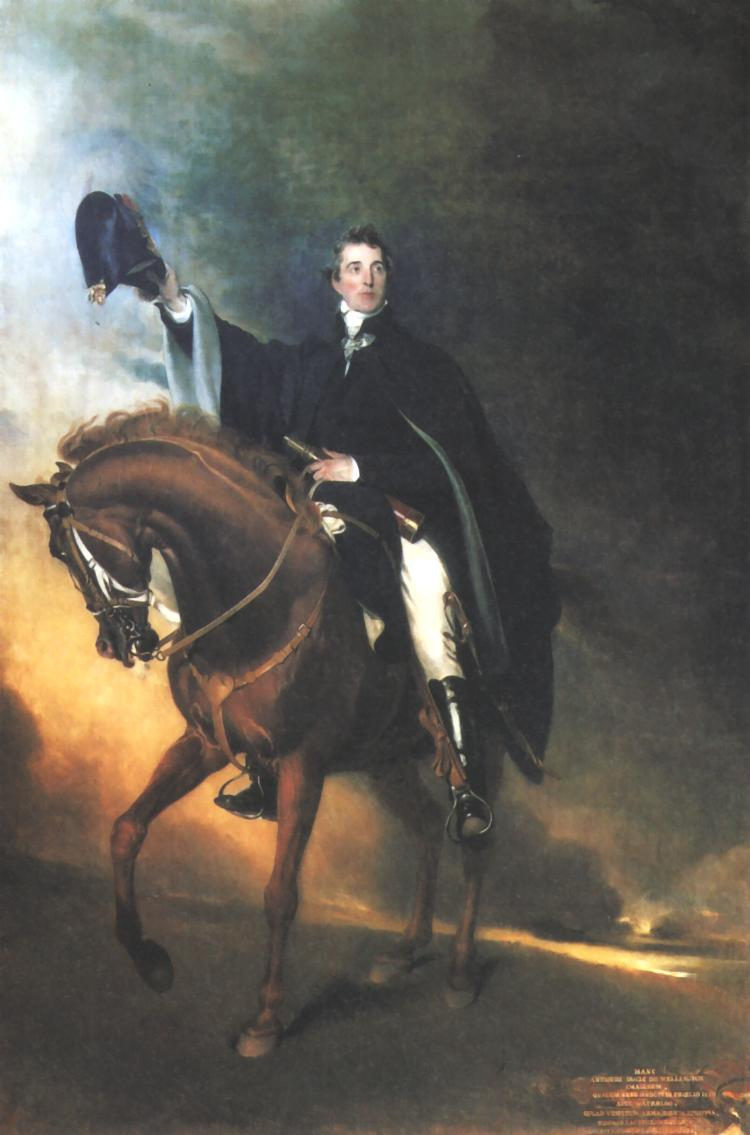
Wellington on Copenhagen, painted by Thomas Lawrence.

Copenhagen raced until he was a four-year-old in the name of General Grosvenor. Copenhagen did not race as a two-year-old and was retired from racing in May 1812. He was a moderately successful racehorse, winning two races during his short racing career, once against a relative of the Derby-winning mare Eleanor.

=== 1811: three-year-old season ===
In his first start at the Craven Meeting in April, Copenhagen was third in a 100-guinea sweepstakes race, losing to the filly Sorcery and an unnamed filly by Dick Andrews. A few days later, Copenhagen won a 50-guinea match race against Mr. Fisher's colt "brother to Spaniard" and was beaten by the filly Tippitywichet in a match race. At the First Spring Meeting in Newmarket, Copenhagen paid 20 guineas forfeit to Lord Bentinck's colt Pheasant and a few days later was beaten by the Duke of Rutland's colt Momus in a 100-guinea match race. At Huntingdon on 6 August, Copenhagen won a sweepstakes race, beating a horse sired by Ambrosio and Cressida (the full-sister of the Derby winning mare Eleanor and the dam of Derby winner Priam) and the next day, Copenhagen was third in a Gold Cup race to the horse by Ambrosio and the colt Juvenal. At Northampton, Copenhagen was third in a 70-guinea County Purse race after finishing second in all of the heats. Copenhagen finished third in a sweepstakes race and was third in the Oatlands Stakes at the Tarporley-Hunt meeting on 7 November.

=== 1812: four-year-old season ===
Copenhagen started three times in 1812. At Chester on 4 May, Copenhagen was third in a £50 Maiden Plate run in three heats, finishing fifth in the first heat and second in the remaining heats. A few days later at the same meeting, Copenhagen finished third in a £70 Cup race run over three heats, finishing fourth in the first heat and second in the remaining heats, and was fourth in a Handicap Sweepstakes in the final start of his career. Copenhagen was retired from racing at the end of the season.

== Military service ==
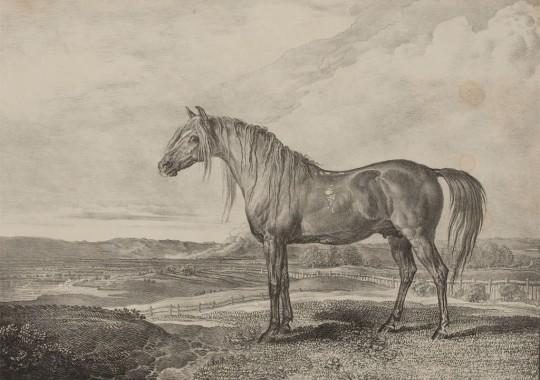
Copenhagen in retirement, a lithograph by James Ward.

General Grosvenor sold Copenhagen to Charles Stewart (later the Marquess of Londonderry) in 1812. Copenhagen was sent to Lisbon in 1813 with a contingent of other horses due to Stewart's service as an adjutant-general in the Peninsular War. When Stewart left Spain to "join the Allied armies in Germany", Copenhagen was sold to Colonel Charles Wood (or alternatively Colonel Gordon, who died at Waterloo) for "200 or 250 guineas", £300 or £400, depending on the source. The Colonel bought Copenhagen and another horse for the Duke of Wellington.

Wellington rode Copenhagen in a number of battles. Before Waterloo he took him on his hazardous ride to Wavre to liaise with Marshal Blücher. Copenhagen was the Duke's mount during the Battle of Waterloo, carrying him for 17 hours continuously during the battle. Immediately after the battle, from which Wellington emerged uninjured, Wellington dismounted and patted Copenhagen on the flank, causing the horse to kick towards the Duke's head, which the Duke narrowly avoided.

Copenhagen continued to be Wellington's primary horse during the occupation of France.

== Retirement and death ==
The Duke continued to ride Copenhagen in parades and other ceremonial events after the battle. Hair from the horse was made into jewellery. The horse was retired to the Duke's Stratfield Saye House and lived as a pensioner there for the remainder of his long life. Copenhagen was said to, "like being noticed" and "kissed hands and ate his apples with all possible grace."

=== Funeral and grave site ===
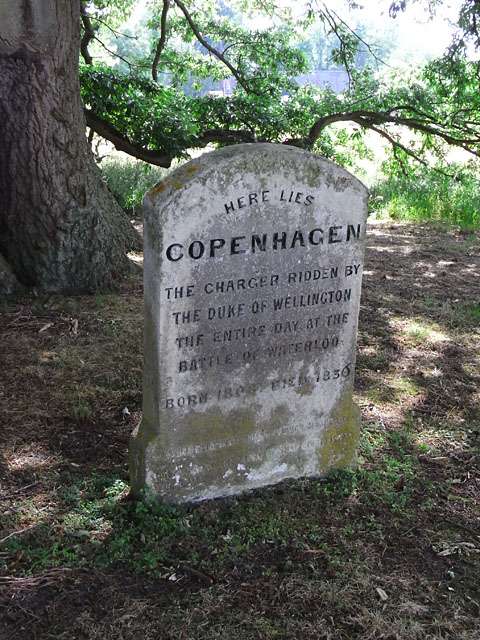
Copenhagen's headstone with faded epitaph beneath the Turkey Oak planted by Mrs. (Elizabeth) Apostles in 1843 as photographed in 2009.

Copenhagen died on 12 February 1836 at Stratfield Saye at the age of 28 years, reportedly due to indulging in too many sugary "dainties" such as "sponge cakes, bath buns and chocolate creams". Still, he most likely died due to his advanced age. He was buried "very early in the morning" the next day with full military honours in the Ice-House Paddock at the Duke's country residence, Stratfield Saye House. The Duke personally witnessed the horse's burial and reportedly "flew into a most violent passion" when he noticed that one of Copenhagen's hooves had been cut off as a souvenir. The Duke reportedly exhumed Copenhagen's body a few months after his death to retrieve the other hooves as keepsakes, but "his three remaining hoofs had rotted away." The pilfered hoof was eventually recovered. According to one source, a farmer bought the hoof for a little over three shillings and returned the hoof directly to the Duke. In another account, a servant confessed to the Duke's son many years after the incident to taking the hoof, stating that at the time, "None of us imagined that the first Duke would trouble his head about the carcase of the horse." The returned hoof was later made into an ink-stand by the second Duke.

Copenhagen was buried without a headstone, and a few years after his death, the Duke was asked by the United Services Museum to disinter his body so that Copenhagen's skeleton could be publicly displayed alongside the skeleton of Napoleon's horse Marengo. The Duke refused and claimed that he did not "know for sure where Copenhagen was buried," a false statement given that the Duke had witnessed Copenhagen's burial. The paddock where he was buried at one time had "a noble cluster of elms in the centre" and his grave was once surrounded by a small railing. The large Turkey Oak that presently shades Copenhagen's grave was planted by the elder Duke's housekeeper Mrs (Elizabeth) Apostles seven years after the horse's death on 21 November 1843 in commemoration of her twentieth year of service to the Duke.

After his father's death, his son personally created an epitaph for Copenhagen and placed a marble grave marker beside the tree that was planted over his burial site. A lead plaque with the inscription and "some coins of George IV, William IV and Queen Victoria" was buried at the grave site. The inscription, the bottom half faded over time, reads:

Here Lies
COPENHAGEN
The Charger ridden by
THE DUKE OF WELLINGTON
The entire day at the
BATTLE OF WATERLOO.
Born 1808. Died 1836.

God's humbler instrument though meaner clay
Should share the glory of that glorious day.

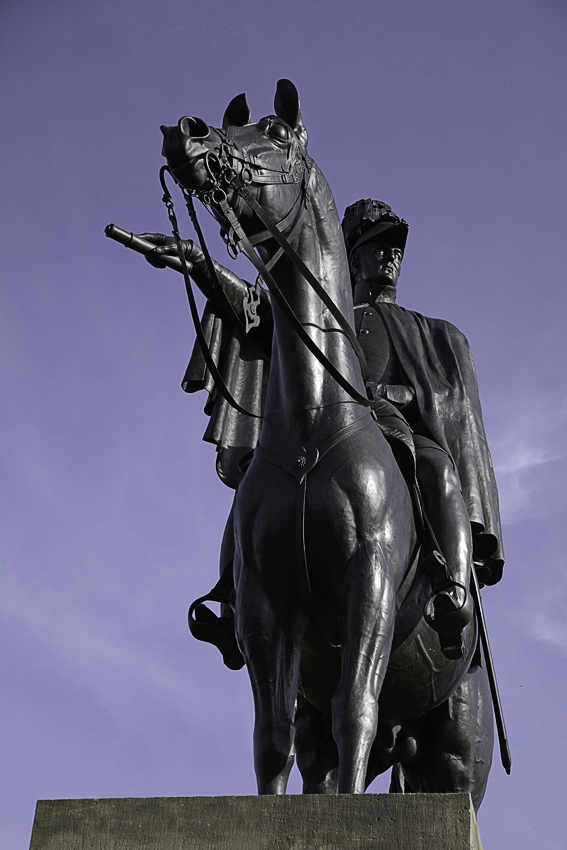
Head-on view of Copenhagen in the Wellington Statue designed by Matthew Cotes Wyatt and unveiled in 1846. The second Duke thought that the horse's face was a good likeness of Copenhagen.

The concluding couplet was composed by Rowland Egerton-Warburton.

== Cultural references ==
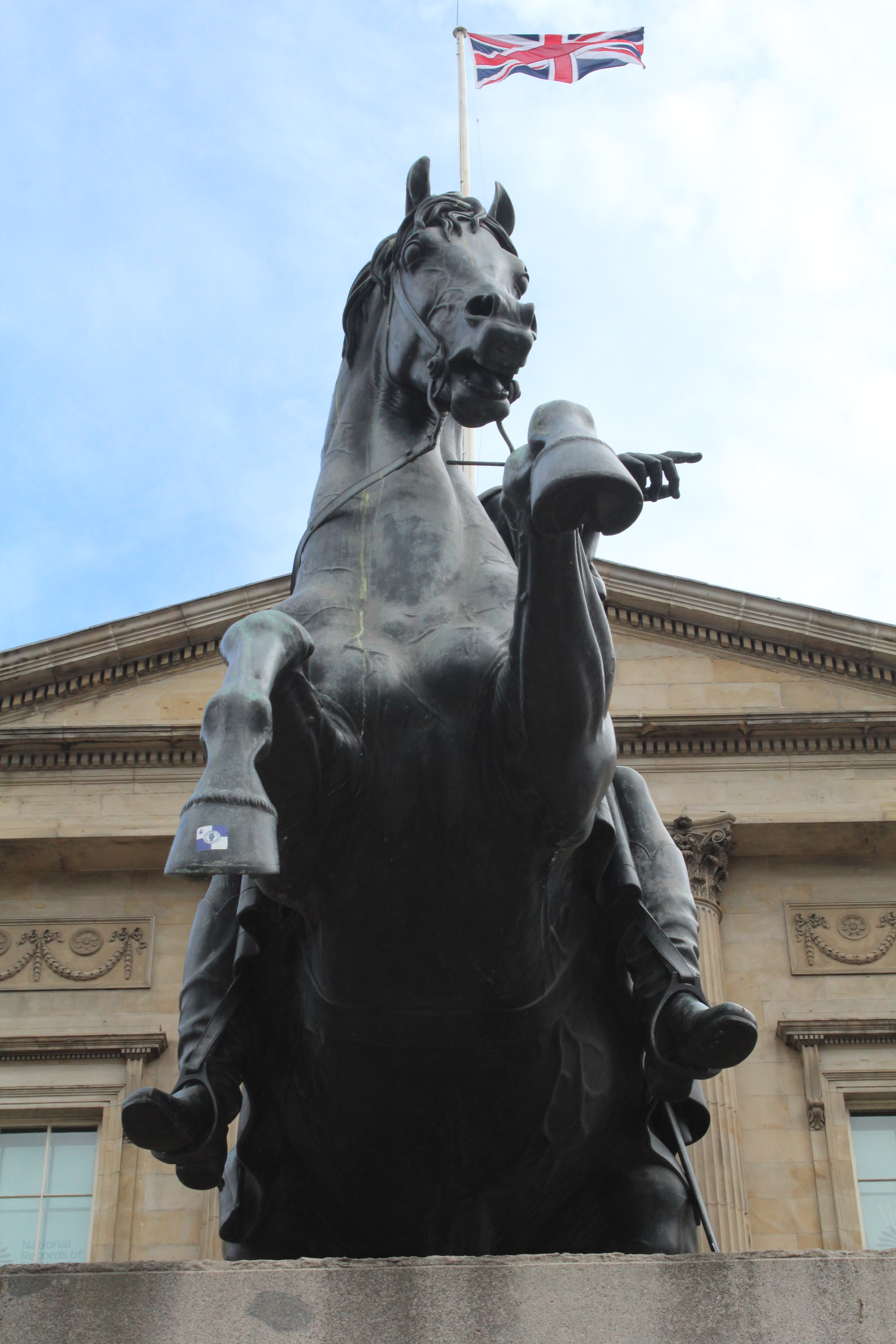
Copenhagen's likeness in the equestrian statue of Wellington by John Steell in front of General Register House in Edinburgh, unveiled 18 June 1852

=== Depictions in art ===
Copenhagen was depicted as "a bay, a grey and a chestnut" in various paintings during his lifetime and after his death. In one instance the choice of his coat colour was due to personal preference. Copenhagen was painted accurately as a chestnut by Edwin Landseer, but the original work was repainted with Copenhagen as a grey on the orders of Lady Charles Wellesley due to her "having a preference for the grey colour in horses."

==== Wyatt statue ====
The Duke of Wellington and Copenhagen were the subject of a "colossal" bronze statue designed by Matthew Cotes Wyatt and his son James. Construction of the statue began in 1840, four years after Copenhagen's death, and lasted until 1843. The 40-tonne (40,000 kg), 8-metre-long (26 ft) and 9-metre-tall (30 ft) statue was unveiled on 28 September 1846 with much fanfare and was hoisted into a prominent position on top of the Triumphal Arch, then located a short distance from the Duke's London residence, Apsley House, on Hyde Park Corner. Copenhagen's belly had a girth of 22 feet and eight inches and the section was used to host a "celebratory dinner" for Wyatt before the work was completed, and a "rider on horseback could readily pass under Copenhagen's torso without danger of scraping his beaver hat." The portrayal was generally ridiculed in the press and by the public with a French spectator to the unveiling reportedly saying, "We have been avenged!" A young soldier reportedly said Wyatt's statue was "warning ambitious young officers of the fate that awaits them if ever they are so unfortunate as to achieve greatness." The statue was viewable from Apsley House and remained at the Hyde Park location for the remainder of the Duke's life.

Wyatt reportedly had difficulty sculpting the figure of Copenhagen and did not want to base the statue on Copenhagen's actual form in his later years, which was short, "calf-kneed and cow-hocked [with] quarters that drooped in a most unattractive fashion." As a substitute, he based the statue on the conformation and measurements of the Thoroughbred racehorse Recovery, which he obtained from The Pictorial Gallery of Racehorses. During construction, the Duke's son and the artist Edwin Landseer toured Wyatt's foundry and viewed the cast of the horse's head. The rendition of Copenhagen's face with prominent flared nostrils was likened to "something like a pig's snout" by the press, which the second Duke asserted was an accurate portrayal and "very like Copenhagen."

=== Modern depictions ===
- Copenhagen is mentioned in Part 1 Chapter 1 of Finnegans Wake by James Joyce, identified as the horse of "Willingdone" (Wellington) and going under several names including Cokenhape, Capeinhope, and Culpenhelp.
- Copenhagen is played by Daniel Rigby in BBC Radio 4's Warhorses of Letters, "the world's first epistolary equine love story", a comic exchange of letters between Copenhagen and Napoleon's horse Marengo (played by Stephen Fry). The comedy ran for three series.
- Copenhagen also appears alongside the Duke of Wellington in Bernard Cornwell's novel Sharpe's Waterloo; in the historical note to his later novel Sharpe's Prey, depicting the Battle of Copenhagen in 1807, Cornwell mentions Copenhagen's birth and commemorative naming.
- Copenhagen is mentioned in Georgette Heyer's Regency Romance novel The Grand Sophy, when the heroine, Sophy, talks about her own horse, Salamanca.

== Pedigree ==
Pedigree of Copenhagen (GB), Chestnut colt, 1808
Sire Meteor (GB) Chestnut, 1783	Eclipse; 1764	Marske	Squirt
Sire Meteor (GB) Chestnut, 1783	Eclipse; 1764	Marske	Ruby Mare
Sire Meteor (GB) Chestnut, 1783	Eclipse; 1764	Spilletta	Regulus
Sire Meteor (GB) Chestnut, 1783	Eclipse; 1764	Spilletta	Mother Western
Sire Meteor (GB) Chestnut, 1783	Merlin Mare; 1765	Merlin	Second
Sire Meteor (GB) Chestnut, 1783	Merlin Mare; 1765	Merlin	Sister to Blank
Sire Meteor (GB) Chestnut, 1783	Merlin Mare; 1765	Mother Pratt	Marksman
Sire Meteor (GB) Chestnut, 1783	Merlin Mare; 1765	Mother Pratt	Mixbury Mare
Dam Lady Catherine 1796	John Bull; 1790	Fortitude	Herod
Dam Lady Catherine 1796	John Bull; 1790	Fortitude	Snap Mare
Dam Lady Catherine 1796	John Bull; 1790	Xantippe	Eclipse
Dam Lady Catherine 1796	John Bull; 1790	Xantippe	Grecian Princess
Dam Lady Catherine 1796	Rutland Arabian Mare	Rutland Arabian	Unknown
Dam Lady Catherine 1796	Rutland Arabian Mare	Rutland Arabian	Unknown
Dam Lady Catherine 1796	Rutland Arabian Mare	A hunting mare	Unknown
Dam Lady Catherine 1796	Rutland Arabian Mare	A hunting mare	Unknown

- Copenhagen's great-grandam was a "hunting mare" (three parts Thoroughbred or not at all), while his sire was a full-blooded Thoroughbred. He was also inbred 2x4 to Eclipse, meaning that this horse was his grandsire and also appeared in the fourth generation of his pedigree.

== See also ==
- List of racehorses
