= Parson (disambiguation) =

A parson is an Anglican parish priest.

Parson may also refer to:

== People with the given name or nickname ==
- Parson James (born 1994), American singer and songwriter
- Parson Nicholson (1863–1917), American baseball player
- Parson Perryman (1888–1966), American baseball player

== People with the surname ==
- Alison Parson (born c. 1984), American country singer and songwriter
- Annie-B Parson, American choreographer and dancer
- Chris Parson, American voice actor
- Chris Parson (American football) (born 2004), American football player
- Del Parson (born 1948), American painter
- Elizabeth Parson (1812–1873), British hymn writer
- Henry George Parson (1865–1936), English-Canadian merchant and politician
- Hubert T. Parson (1872–1940), American businessman
- Mike Parson (born 1955), American politician and governor of Missouri since 2018
- Rynell Parson (born 1990), American sprinter

== Other uses ==
- Parson, British Columbia, an unincorporated community
- Parson's Pleasure, a place for nude bathing in Oxford, and a short story by Roald Dahl
- Parsons table, a modernist straight-edged table
- Parson Russell Terrier, a breed of dog
- Parson's chameleon

== See also ==
- Parsons (disambiguation)
