= Tom Parsons =

Tom Parsons may refer to:

- Tom Parsons (Gaelic footballer) (born 1988), Irish Gaelic football player
- Tom Parsons (cricketer) (born 1987), British cricketer
- Tom Parsons (rugby union) (born 1990), New Zealand rugby union player
- Tom Parsons (high jumper) (born 1984), British athlete
- Tom Parsons (baseball) (born 1939), American baseball pitcher
- Tom Parsons (actor), British actor

== See also ==
- Thomas Parsons (disambiguation)
