= Jack Parsons (sociologist) =

British sociologist (1920–2006)

- Born: 6 December 1920; Kirkby in Ashfield Nottinghamshire, England
- Died: 3 October 2006; Llantrisant, Wales
- Occupation: Sociologist
- Years active: 1955–2006

Jack Parsons (6 December 1920 – 3 October 2006) was a sociologist who advocated and promoted the practice of population control. He also wrote, directed, produced, and edited a documentary film, The Blackhill Campaign, between 1959 and 1963, about the closure of a coal mine near Berwick Upon Tweed in 1959.

== Early life and education ==
Parsons was born in Nottinghamshire in 1920, the first-born son of Joe Parsons and his wife Dora. Joe was a coal miner and veteran artilleryman who had been seriously wounded whilst serving on The Western Front of World War I in 1914–1918. He had five siblings. After leaving school at 14 he became an apprentice machinist in light engineering in Nottingham. This was a 'reserved occupation' at the outbreak of war in 1939; however in 1941 there was a recruitment drive for air crew, and Jack volunteered. He served in the Royal Air Force during World War II, training in the U.K., with the Oxbridge University Air Squadron, and also in what is now Zimbabwe, as part of The Empire Air Training Scheme. Coming from a working-class background with no higher education, he experienced class bias within the military and never became a commissioned officer. He attained the N.C.O. rank of Sergeant Pilot, flying Tiger Moths, Hurricanes, Oxfords and Blenheims. He was in training to fly Mosquito fighter bombers in the night intruder role as the war in Europe came to an end, he was then posted by the R.A.F as a radio technician to India during the twilight of British rule there. Jack was demobilized in 1946 then subsequently working in civil engineering and studying as a mature student at Keele University from 1952 to 1955.

== Career ==
Parsons then worked as a research officer for the National Coal Board until 1959, before his first academic appointment at the Brunel College of Technology in London. He moved to Cardiff in 1975, where he worked at the Sir David Owen Population Centre at Cardiff University until his retirement in 1981. Parsons continued to write and publish until his death in 2006.

== Population control research ==
Parsons became interested in population control during the 1960s, and began the research that led to a significant body of books and articles being published between 1971 and 1998. His thesis was that overpopulation can be seen as a threat to personal liberty and that the governments of developed countries deliberately encouraged unsustainable population growth as a form of political control. This was first proposed in Parsons' 1971 monograph Population Versus Liberty, and developed further over the following decades, culminating in his two-volume monograph A Study of the Pursuit of Power Through Numbers in 1998. Parsons also saw himself as a maverick and a thorn in the side of the political establishment, believing that it deliberately sought to suppress his research. His detractors regarded him as a conspiracy theorist. In 2001 he founded his own publishing company, the Population Policy Press, primarily to publish his own work, claiming that reputable academic publishers refused to do so on account of its controversial nature. In his last major published work, The Treason of the BBC (2006), Parsons accused the British Broadcasting Corporation of suppressing the debate around overpopulation.

== Blackhill campaign ==
In 1959 Parsons read about the political controversy that had emerged following the announcement by the National Coal Board (NCB) that Blackhill Colliery, near the village of Scremerston in Northumberland, was to close with the loss of 160 jobs. Parsons was working for the NCB at the time. It was rumoured that the decision was the result of a national deal that had been made between the NCB and the National Union of Mineworkers (NUM) to manage the contraction in the coal industry that had been necessitated by falling demand in the late 1950s. Parsons wrote an article condemning the centralised decision making that had driven the process, arguing that the local community and businesses dependent on the mine should have been involved. On the advice and encouragement of his friend, the Free Cinema filmmaker Karel Reisz, Parsons then decided to make a documentary about the campaign, despite being an amateur with no formal training in or prior knowledge of film production. The film was produced in his spare time between 1959 and 1963, with the only professional help coming from a completion grant provided by the British Film Institute's Experimental Production Fund in the final months of the process. Given the film's amateur provenance, it received a surprisingly positive reception by critics following the first screenings in the winter of 1963-64: The Observer's reviewer, for example, described The Blackhill Campaign as 'a much more powerful and real thing to give film goers than the numbing second features that are pumped out satisfy their alleged appetite'.

Despite the positive reception of The Blackhill Campaign, Parsons returned to his career as a sociologist and did not make any further films. Blackhill had disappeared from the British Film Institute's non-theatrical distribution catalogue by the late 1960s, and was in effect a lost film until its rediscovery and restoration by the Northern Region Film and Television Archive in 2004.

== Personal life ==
Parsons was survived by his widow Barbara Parsons (née Barker, born London, 1938) a retired family therapist & fine artist, a daughter Miranda, medical therapist and homemaker (born London, 1962), and a son Toby Gerard (born London,1964), construction worker/ fine artist. He had two grandchildren at the time, Madeleine and Rachel.

== Bibliography ==
- Population Versus Liberty, London, 1971, Population Policy Press (ISBN 0-9541978-0-1).
- Population Fallacies, Llantrisant, Population Policy Press, 1977 (ISBN 978-0301740317).
- A Study of the Pursuit of Power Through Numbers, New York, Edwin Mellen Press, 1998 (ISBN 978-0773483729).
- Jack Parsons on the Human Population Competition: A Short Synopsis of His Major Work, Llantrisant, Population Policy Press, 2002 (ISBN 978-0954197834).
- Do Doctors Cause Wars?, Llantrisant, Population Policy Press, 2003 (ISBN 978-0954197896).
- The Treason of the BBC, Llantrisant, Population Policy Press, 2006 (ISBN 1-904791-05-0).
