= Tommy Parsons =

American baseball player (born 1995)

- Pitcher
- Born: September 1, 1995 (age 30); Columbus, Ohio, U.S.
- Bats: Right Throws: Right

Thomas Britton Parsons (born September 1, 1995) is an American former professional baseball pitcher.

== Career ==
=== Amateur ===
Parsons graduated from New Albany High School in New Albany, Ohio, in 2014. After graduating, he enrolled at Adrian College where he played college baseball. For his career, he started 44 games and compiled a 40–4 record with a 2.21 ERA, all three being program records. He was undrafted in the 2018 MLB draft and signed with the St. Louis Cardinals as an undrafted free agent.

=== St. Louis Cardinals ===
After signing, Parsons made his professional debut that summer for the Johnson City Cardinals of the Rookie-level Appalachian League, going 5–1 with a 3.00 ERA in 13 games (nine starts), earning a spot on the All-Star team. In 2019, Parsons began the year with the Peoria Chiefs of the Single–A Midwest League. He was named the Midwest League Player of the Month for April after giving up only one run in thirty innings of work. He was promoted to the Palm Beach Cardinals of the High–A Florida State League in May, and earned another promotion to the Springfield Cardinals of the Double–A Texas League in June. In August, he made one start for the Memphis Redbirds of the Triple–A Pacific Coast League. Over 27 starts between the four clubs, Parsons went 11–9 with a 3.53 ERA, while leading the minor leagues with 165 2/3 innings pitched.

Parsons did not play in a game in 2020 due to the cancellation of the minor league season because of the COVID-19 pandemic. For the 2021 season, he returned to Memphis, appearing in 24 games (nine starts) in which he went 2-6 with a 5.86 ERA over 73 2/3 innings. He returned to Memphis for the 2022 season. Over 38 games (17 starts), he posted a 12-4 record with a 4.31 ERA and 110 strikeouts over 135 2/3 innings.

Parsons was assigned to Memphis to begin the year for the third straight season in 2023. In 19 games (14 starts), he struggled to a 1–6 record and 7.30 ERA with 53 strikeouts across 74.0 innings of work. On August 1, 2023, Parsons was released by the Cardinals organization.
