= Caractacus (horse) =

British Thoroughbred racehorse

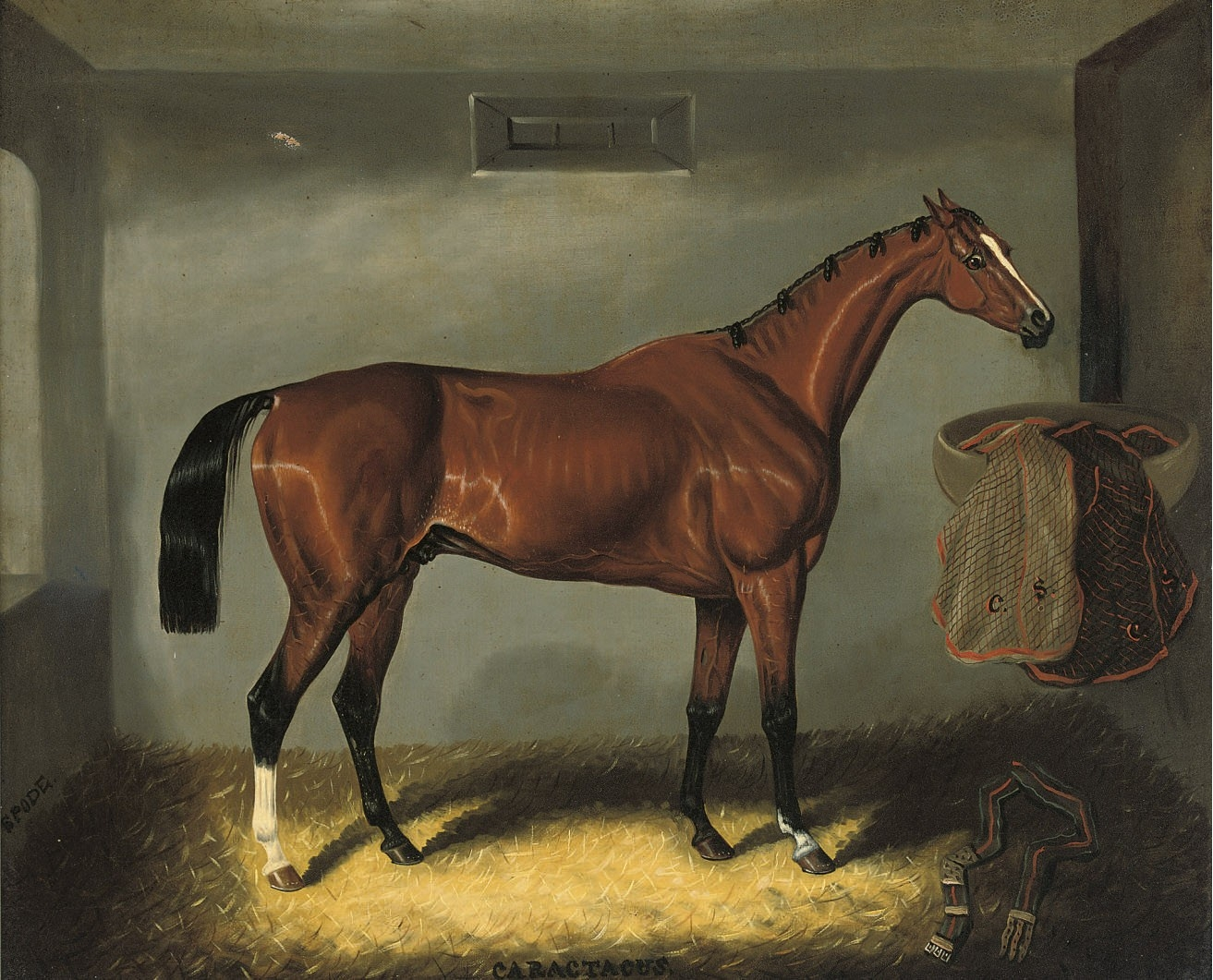
- Caractacus as painted by Samuel Spode.
- Sire: Kingston
- Grandsire: Venison
- Dam: Defenceless
- Damsire: Defence
- Sex: Stallion
- Foaled: 1859
- Country: United Kingdom of Great Britain and Ireland
- Colour: Bay
- Breeder: William Blenkiron
- Owner: Charles Snewing
- Trainer: Robert Smith
- Record: 9:2–2–1
- Earnings: £7,545

Major wins
- Somersetshire Stakes (1862); Epsom Derby (1862)

Caractacus (1859–1878) was a Thoroughbred racehorse that won the 1862 Epsom Derby. The 1862 Derby was memorable due to the large field (34 horses), the winner being ridden by a 16-year-old stable boy and Caractacus' near disqualification for an underweight jockey and a false start. Caractacus was considered a poor choice to win the Derby, which was ultimately his last racing engagement before injury forced his retirement from racing. Caractacus was a breeding stallion in Britain from 1862 until 1873, when he was exported to Russia where he died in 1878. He is not considered to be a successful sire.

== Background ==
Caractacus was foaled in 1859 at William Blenkiron's Middle Park stud farm in Eltham. He was sired by Kingston (foaled 1849), described as "one of the handsomest horses" and a winner of several important stakes races. Kingston died in 1861 before Caractacus’ Derby win. Caractacus' dam, Defenceless (foaled in 1844), was bred by W. Etwall and was sired by Defence out of an unnamed mare sired by Cain. Defenceless was not a successful racehorse, starting only once as a two-year-old and finishing last. Defenceless went completely blind as a three-year-old. Blenkiron frequently observed the mare's ability to maneuver obstacles: she would "canter as hard as she [could] go as straight as a line to the trough and stop dead within two yards of it." Her only noteworthy produce out of nineteen foals was Caractacus. Caractacus was described as a bay colt that stood 15.1 hands high, with a “light” neck, fine shoulders, good girth and sound feet. He had a large white blaze, a white sock on his right front foot and a grey full-stocking on his right hind leg. He had a “corky” personality and possessed refined movement, leading him to be described as a “slashing goer.”

As a yearling, Caractacus was bought for 250 guineas by the trainer William Day, acting on behalf of a London publican named Charles Snewing who also was a veterinary surgeon. In spring 1861, the two-year-old colt was moved to a stable at Harpenden in Hertfordshire, where his training was managed by Robert "Bob" Smith.

Allegedly, the colt was named 'Caractacus' because Snewing had admired a statue of the British chieftain Caratacus bound in chains at the 1851 Exhibition. He is reported to have said, "If ever I try a horse good enough I'll call him Caractacus, and win the Derby with him."

== Racing career ==
Caractacus was not a promising two-year-old, and did not win any of his starts in 1861. As a three-year-old, he only showed promise near the end of the season. He started nine times in his racing career, winning the Epsom Derby and the Somersetshire Stakes in 1862, and was second in two races and third in one race. He was entered in the 1862 St. Leger Stakes, but injured both his front legs before the running and was subsequently retired from racing.

=== 1861: two-year-old season ===
Caractacus debuted in a four and a half furlong race for two-year-olds at Harpenden with J. Adams as his jockey. He did not finish in the top four, and the race was ultimately won by Mr. Fisher's colt Lord Burleigh. His next engagement was on 28 August in three quarters of a mile Stratton Audley Nursery Handicap in Oxford. He finished fifth out of a field of eight horses behind Turn of Luck while carrying 110 pounds, and he was jockeyed by a teenage stable boy named John Parsons. Parsons again rode Caractacus in the Skeffington Nursery Handicap where, carrying 107 pounds, he was third behind Captain Christie's My Partner.

=== 1862: three-year-old season ===
Caractacus' first start as a three-year-old was in the Great Metropolitan Handicap at the Epsom spring meeting. He was ridden by J. Grimshaw and carried 75 pounds in the two and a quarter mile race. Caractacus was beaten by a head by Elcho who carried 112 pounds. After the Great Metropolitan, Caractacus was moved from Harpenden to a stable in Ilsley. Caractacus secured another second-place finish in the Newmarket Biennial Stakes, losing by two lengths to Joseph Hawley's Sir Rollo. He did not place in his next start for the Chester Cup, which was won by Tim Whiffler. He was third in the two mile Great Northern Handicap, losing to Ivanhoff and The Wizard. He beat Fitz-Avon by two lengths to win the Somersetshire Stakes held in Bath.

==== 1862 Epsom Derby ====
The 1862 Epsom Derby occurred on 4 June with 34 horses lining up for the start, the largest field ever recorded at the Derby. Caractacus was supposed to have been ridden by James "Jim" Goater, but he refused to ride Caractacus in favor of Goater's brother's horse The Sprite. Consequently, Snewing's stable boy John Parsons, thought to be around 16 years old at the time, rode Caractacus as he had done in three of the horse's previous starts. Parsons is reported to be the youngest jockey to ever win the Derby. The two betting favorites were Mr. S. Hawkes' colt The Marquis and Mr. Merry's colt Buckstone, with Caractacus considered a distant outsider for winning the race, although he did impress some observers when cantering to the start. The horses made three false starts before the race was underway, an occurrence blamed on the starter Mr. McGeorge, although it was pointed out that the unusually large field and the rowdy atmosphere made his task a difficult one. Parsons is reported to have encouraged his mount by shouting, "Get along, Crackey" and "Good lad, Crackey." Caractacus, carrying 122 pounds like all the other colts, started from the 17th post position. The Marquis's jockey, Ashmall, attempted to make all the running and turned into the straight with a clear lead, but several challengers emerged, most notably Buckstone and Caractacus. Inside the last furlong, Buckstone was unable to sustain his run, leaving the favourite and the unknown outsider to dispute the finish, and after a "fine race" Caractacus prevailed by a neck in a time two minutes 45.5 seconds with Buckstone and Neptunus finishing third and fourth. When all the jockeys and saddles were weighed post race, Parsons did not initially meet the 122 pound weight requirement. He barely made weight when Caractacus' bridle was added to the tack, preventing the horse's disqualification. Snewing talked many years later about the anxiety of that event, "Oh, the agony I felt at that moment, I would not undergo it again for a thousand pounds." An objection was also raised by Lord Stamford, the owner of a colt named Ensign, that Caractacus and the majority of the field had made false starts and should all be disqualified. As his complaint had been logged 20 minutes post race, five minutes more than 15 minute allowance, the objection was not upheld.

The Derby was ultimately Caractacus' last start. He was entered for the 1862 St. Leger Stakes, but he injured both suspensory ligaments in his front legs shortly before the running and was permanently retired from racing.

The poet "Orange Blossom" for Bell's Life wrote of the horse's unlikely fame:

"Caractacus, whose wonderous shape
Sets every country mouth agape-
And if, of the outsiders there,
One horse should pass the winning chair,
Enrolled in the successful three,
Be sure Caractacus is he."

—Orange Blossom, Bell's Life

== Stud career ==
Caractacus was retired to stud in 1863, with Snewing retaining ownership. He was a breeding stallion first at the Highfield Paddock near St. Albans for an annual fee of 20 guineas. He was moved to the Holywell Stud Farm in Watford sometime before 1872. Caractacus serviced approximately 40 mares per season while in Britain. Caractacus was sold for £7,000 to Mr. Strass who exported him to St. Petersburg at the end of the 1872 breeding season. Caractacus sired about 57 foals in Russia, none of which were successful racers or sires. He produced winners Captivator, Cassivelaunus, Free Trade, Finesse(f) and Trickstress(f). He died in 1878 at the Russian Imperial Stud in Hrenoosky.

== Pedigree ==
Pedigree of Caractacus (GB), bay stallion, 1859
Sire Kingston (GB) 1849	Venison; 1833	Partisan	Walton
Sire Kingston (GB) 1849	Venison; 1833	Partisan	Parasol
Sire Kingston (GB) 1849	Venison; 1833	Fawn	Smolensko
Sire Kingston (GB) 1849	Venison; 1833	Fawn	Jerboa
Sire Kingston (GB) 1849	Queen Anne; 1843	Slane	Royal Oak
Sire Kingston (GB) 1849	Queen Anne; 1843	Slane	Orville Mare
Sire Kingston (GB) 1849	Queen Anne; 1843	Garcia	Octavian
Sire Kingston (GB) 1849	Queen Anne; 1843	Garcia	Shuttle Mare
Dam Defenceless (GB) 1844	Defence; 1824	Whalebone	Waxy
Dam Defenceless (GB) 1844	Defence; 1824	Whalebone	Penelope
Dam Defenceless (GB) 1844	Defence; 1824	Defiance	Rubens
Dam Defenceless (GB) 1844	Defence; 1824	Defiance	Little Folly
Dam Defenceless (GB) 1844	Cain Mare; 1840	Cain	Paulowitz
Dam Defenceless (GB) 1844	Cain Mare; 1840	Cain	Paynator Mare
Dam Defenceless (GB) 1844	Cain Mare; 1840	Ridotto	Reveller
Dam Defenceless (GB) 1844	Cain Mare; 1840	Ridotto	Walton Mare
