= Richard Parsons =

Richard or Dick Parsons may refer to:

- Richard Parsons, 1st Earl of Rosse (1702–1741), Irish freemason and founder member of the Hell-Fire Club
- Richard Parsons (convict) (fl. 1823–1824), Australian convict and explorer
- Richard C. Parsons (1826–1899), U.S. Representative from Ohio
- Richard Parsons (bishop) (1882–1948), English Anglican bishop
- Dick Parsons (British Army officer) (1910–1998), British Army officer and marksman
- Richard Parsons (skier) (1910–1999), American Olympic skier
- Sir Richard Parsons (diplomat) (1928–2016), British ambassador to Hungary, Spain and Sweden
- Dick Parsons (coach) (born 1938), American basketball and baseball coach
- Richard Parsons (businessman) (1948–2024), American businessman, chairman of Citigroup and Time Warner
- Richard Parsons (author) (born 1966), English educational non-fiction author
