= John Robert Parsons =

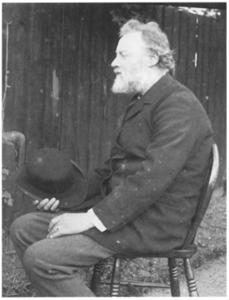
- John Robert Parsons
- Born: c. 1826; Dublin, Ireland
- Died: January 1909 (aged 83); Kensington, London, England
- Occupations: photographer painter

John Robert Parsons (c. 1826 – January 1909) was an Irish photographer and painter. He is best known by the series of photographs he made in 1865 by Dante Gabriel Rossetti's model Jane Morris.

== Life and work ==
Parsons was born in Dublin, the son of gentleman Henry Parsons and his wife, Jane, of Richmond Lodge. He was baptised in April 1827 at St. George's Church, Dublin, and grew up in County Cork. He moved in 1840 to London. There he worked as a painter and between 1850 and 1868 he exhibited several times at the Royal Academy of Arts and Grosvenor Gallery. From 1860 he was also involved with photography and opened a photo studio in Portman Square. Besides portraits, he also took photographs of paintings, including Dante Gabriel Rossetti and James McNeill Whistler.

== Reverie ==
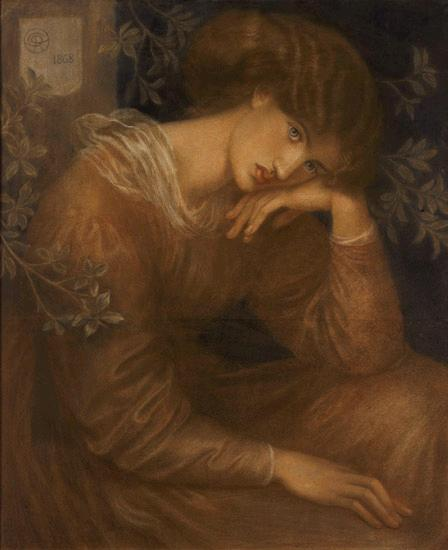
Dante Gabriel Rossetti:
Reverie, model : Jane Morris

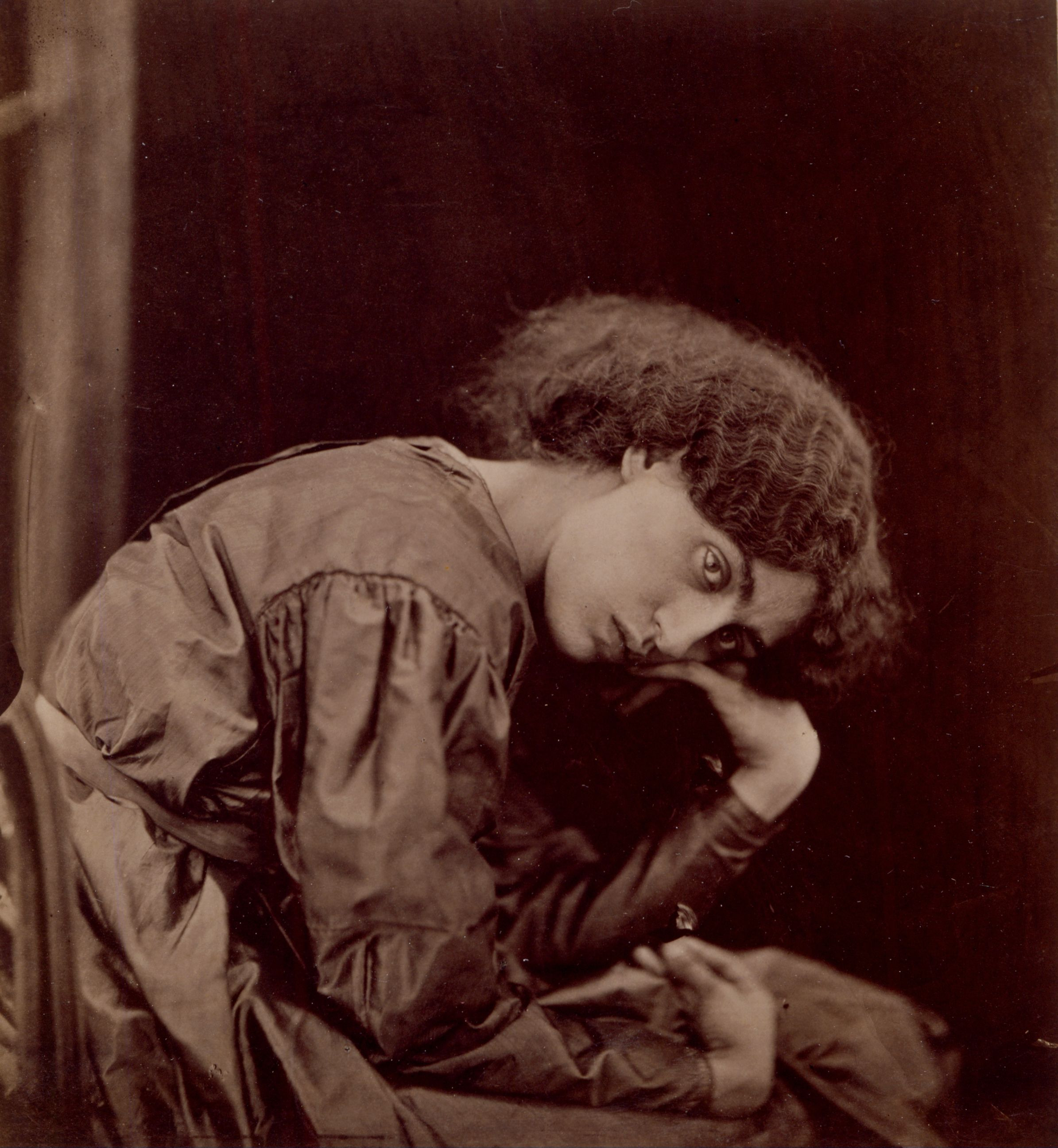
John Robert Parsons:
Jane Morris, 1865

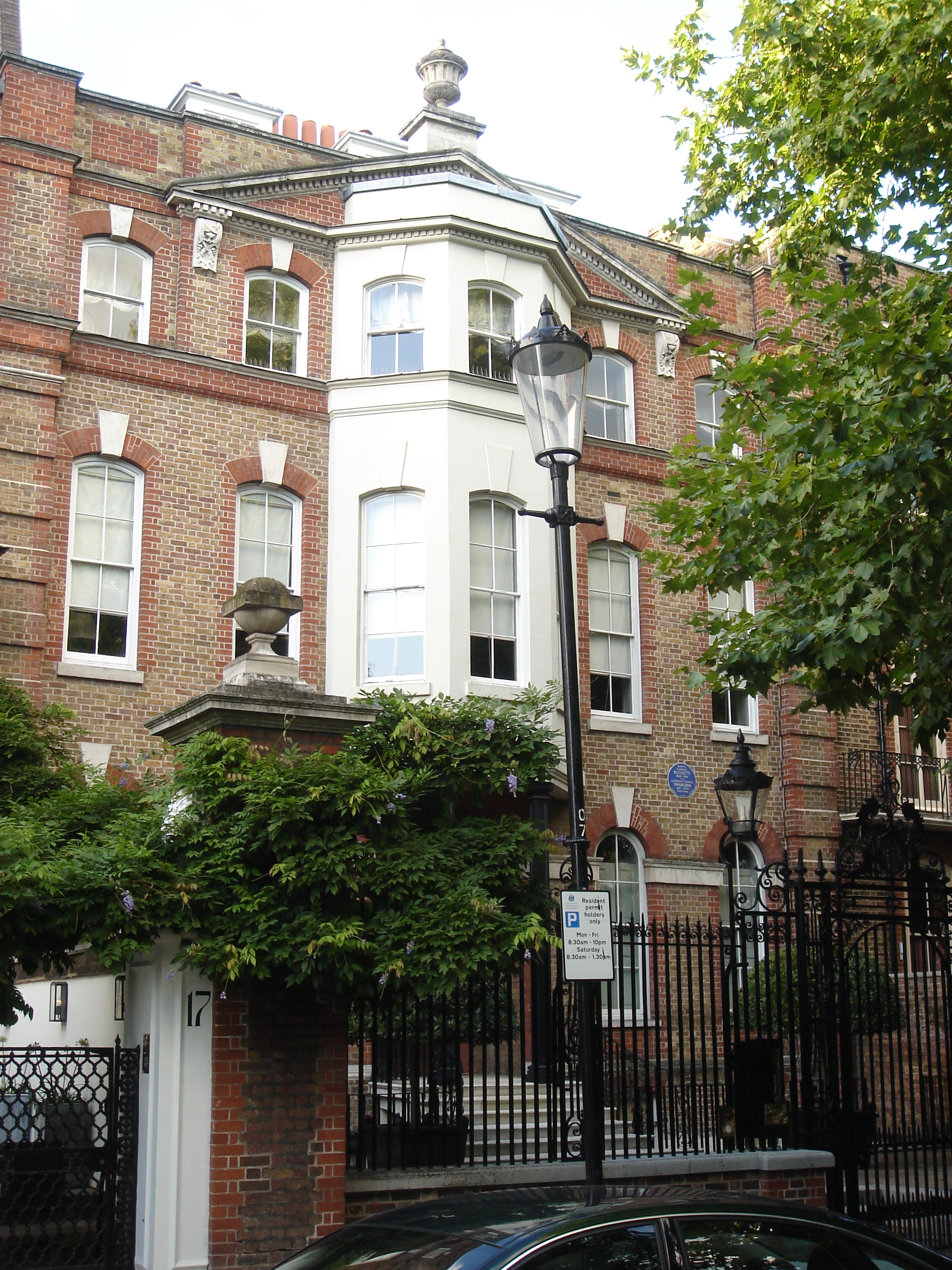
16 Cheyne Walk

Today, Parsons still primarily known for the series of pictures he made at the request of Rossetti in the summer of 1865 Rossetti's former muse and model Jane Morris. The photo shoot in Rossetti's garden and house are eighteen portraits known. Rossetti conducted meticulous control over the poses during the session that took Morris, as well as the clothes they wore and the objects and furniture that were used. It is difficult to say how Rossetti took the photos later as a basis for later paintings. His Reverie in 1868 unmistakably resembles one of the pictures taken, but also be seen similarities with other portraits not only of Morris but also with later portraits Rossetti made of Alexa Wilding. Rossetti, however, used the pictures are not as detailed studies, but probably mainly as tools to visualize certain poses and as a reminder for the times that his model was not available.

== Later ==
Early 1870s Parsons partnered with Rossetti's art dealer Charles Augustin Howell. From about 1870 to 1877 he had a studio in London's Wigmore Street, but from 1878 he photographed no more. From 1888 he would no longer hold exhibitions and he led a secluded life. He was known as a quiet and introverted man.

Parsons was declared bankrupt in 1892. In 1909, he died in solitude in a room in Kensington, on the top floor of Mount Carmel Chambers on Dukes Lane. It took almost a month before his body was discovered. The Times published an article on his death under the headline "An artist's death." Four days later, after the inquest established that he had died a natural death, the newspaper published an obituary, moreover, in which he was praised as "an admirable artist in oil and chalk." Despite his bankruptcy, it was revealed at the inquest into his death that he had "plenty of money" in the apartment and "substantial balance" in his bank account. Multiple unfinished paintings were strewn about the apartment.

To the general public, he remained unknown, partly because he refused to exhibit in the last decades of his life.

A photo portrait Parsons in 1870 made by William Morris currently hangs in the Victoria and Albert Museum. His paintings are located and are scarcely known in private collections.

== Portraits ==
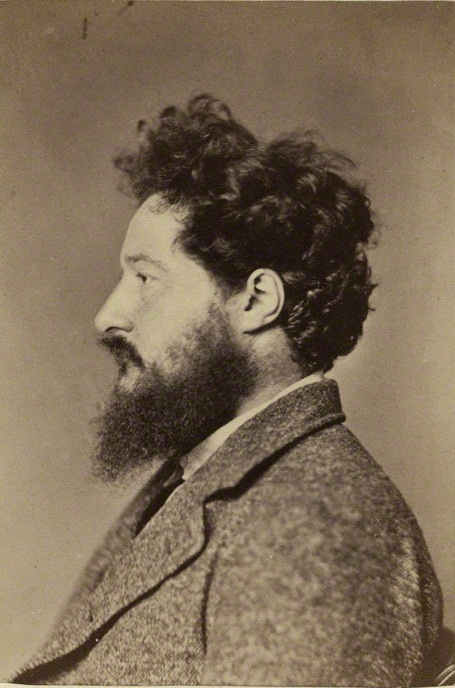
William Morris

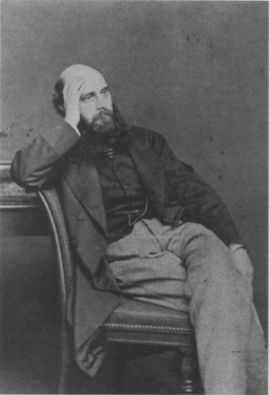
William Michael Rossetti

== Jane Morris, 1865 ==
Jane Morris (née Jane Burden; 1839–1914), photographed by John Robert Parsons, 7 June 1865, posed by Dante Gabriel Rossetti, printed by Emery Walker Ltd. "On 7 June 1865. Two were taken indoors, the rest outside in the garden of Dante Gabriel Rossetti's house at 16 Cheyne Walk, Chelsea."

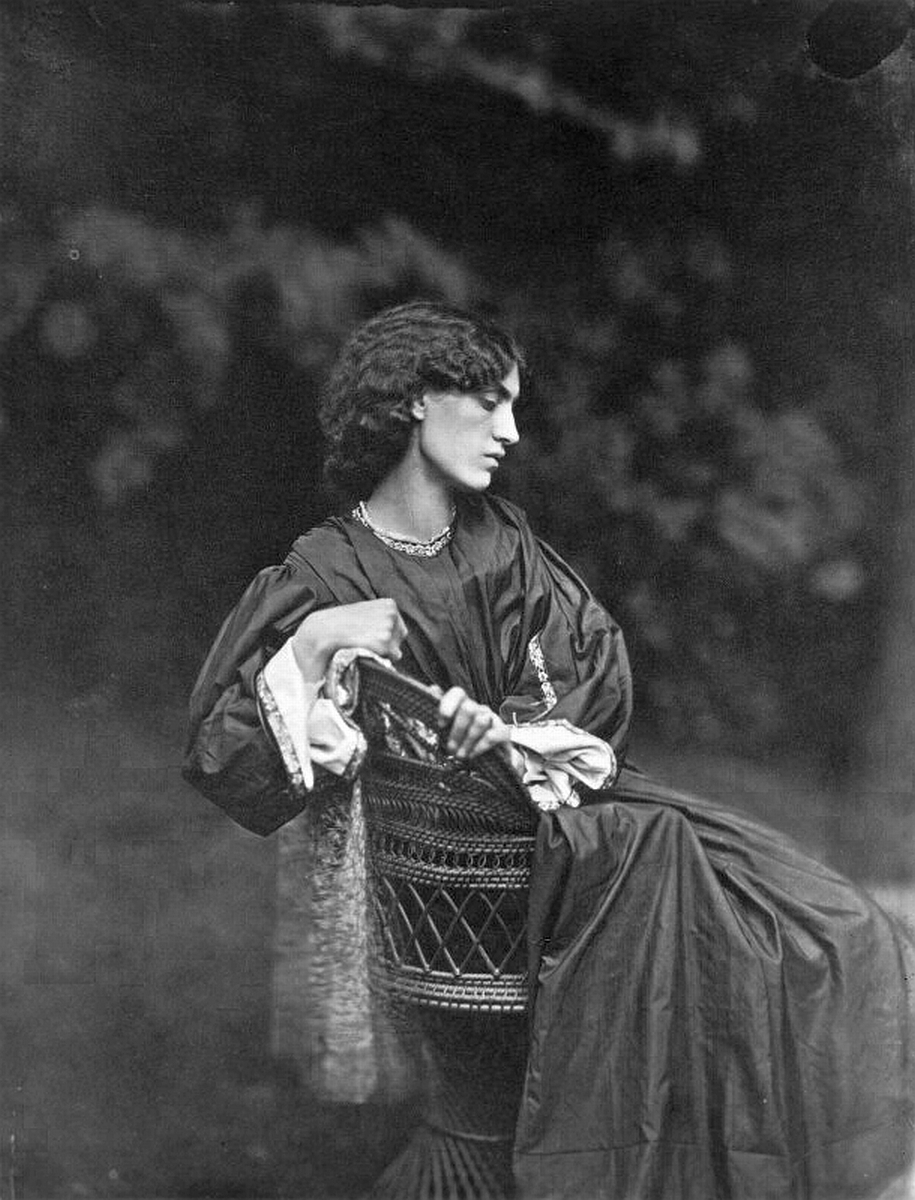

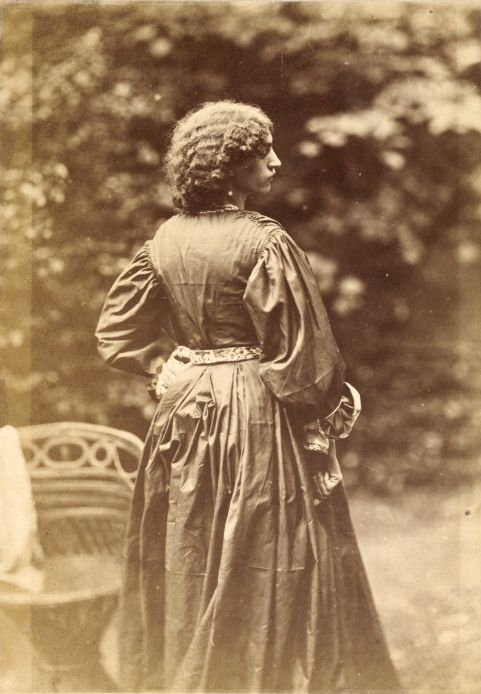

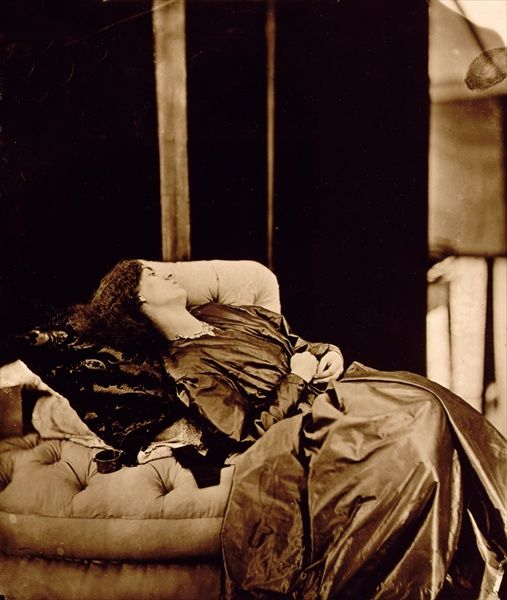

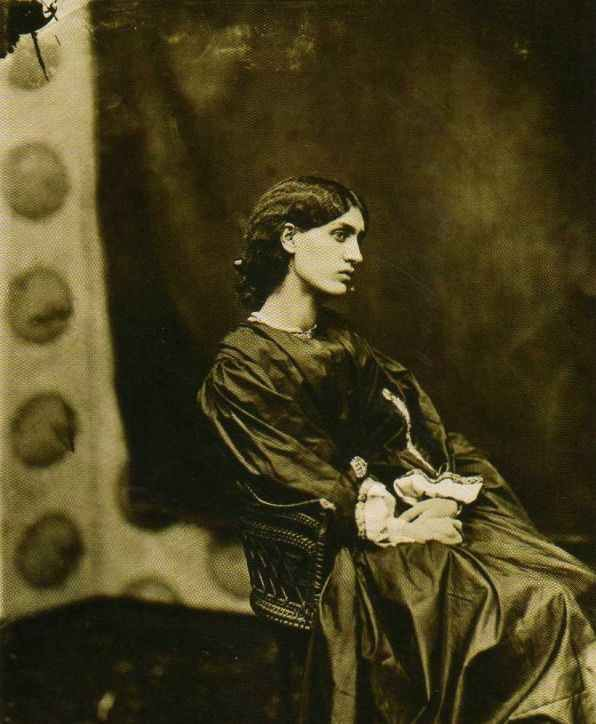

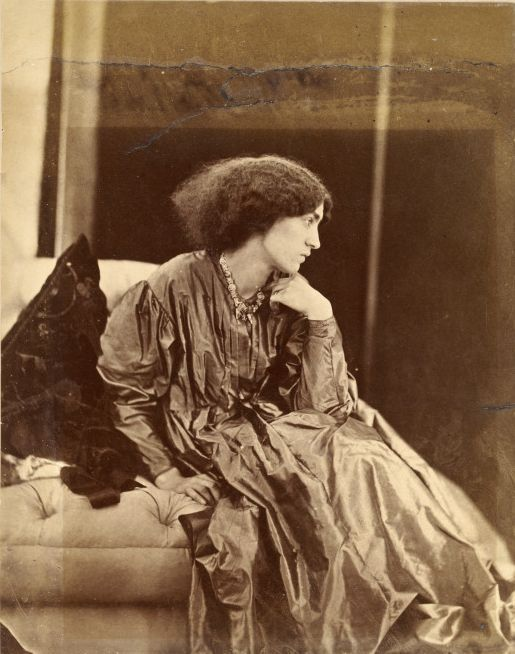

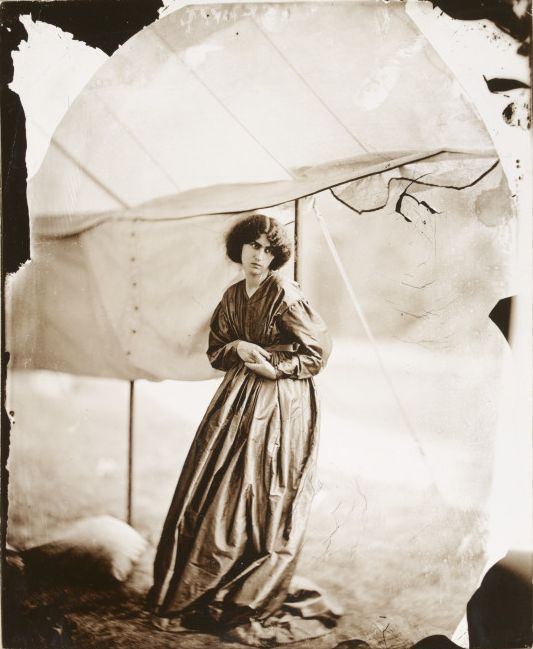

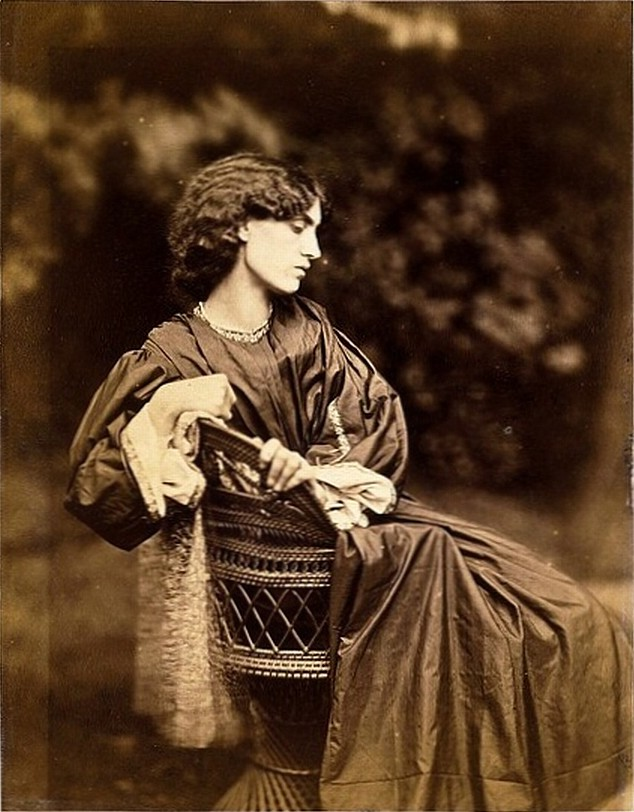

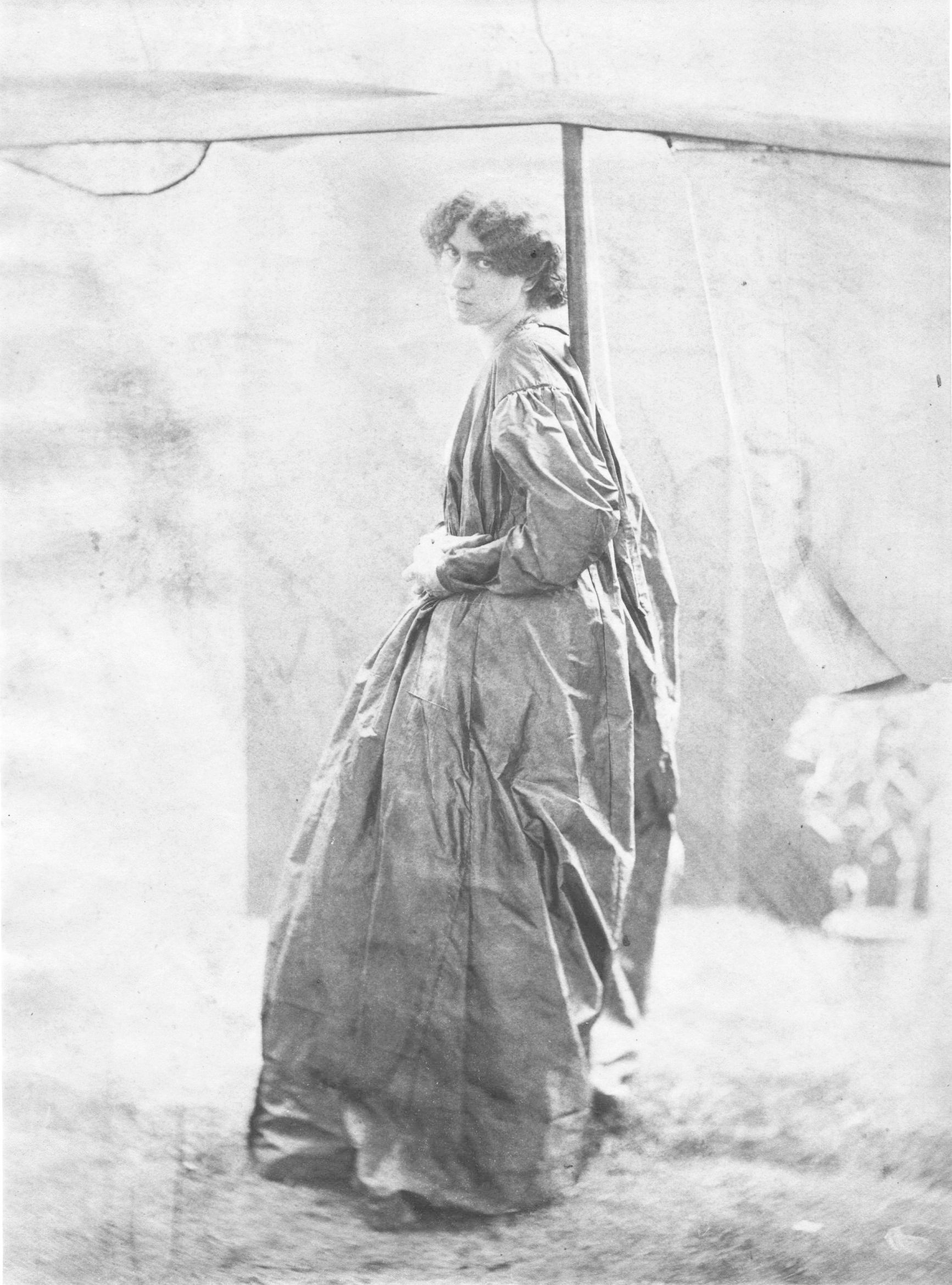

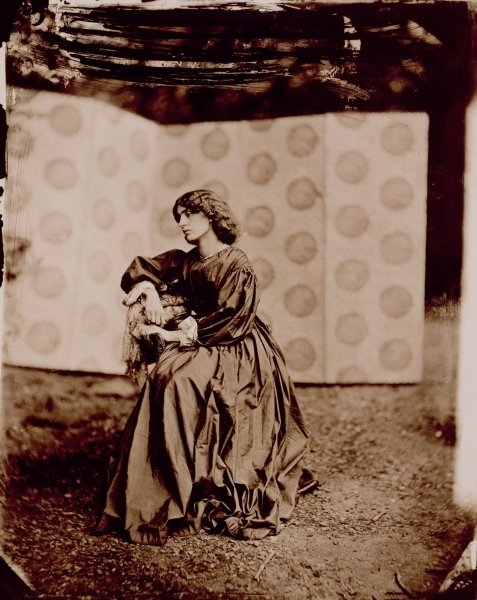

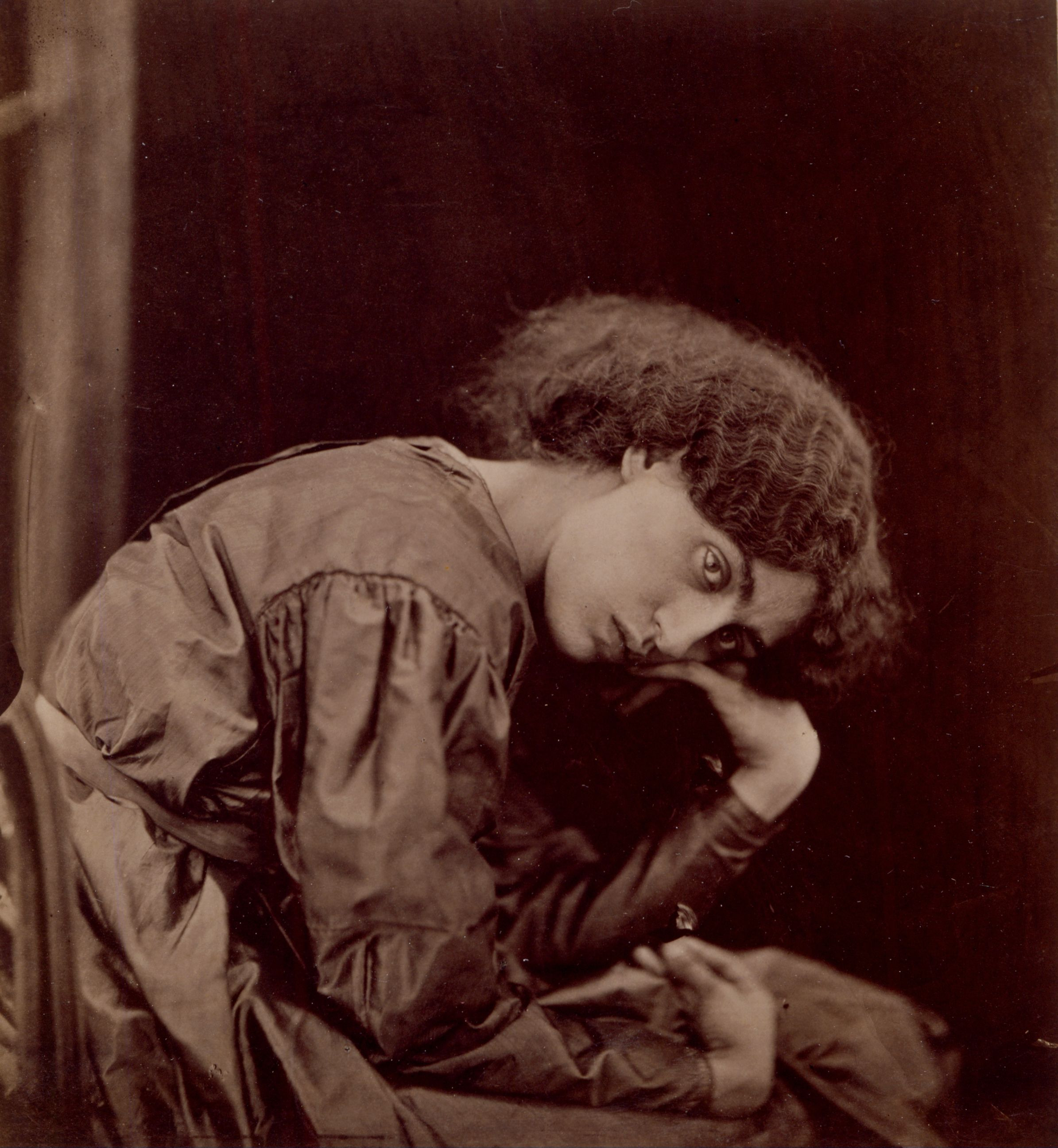

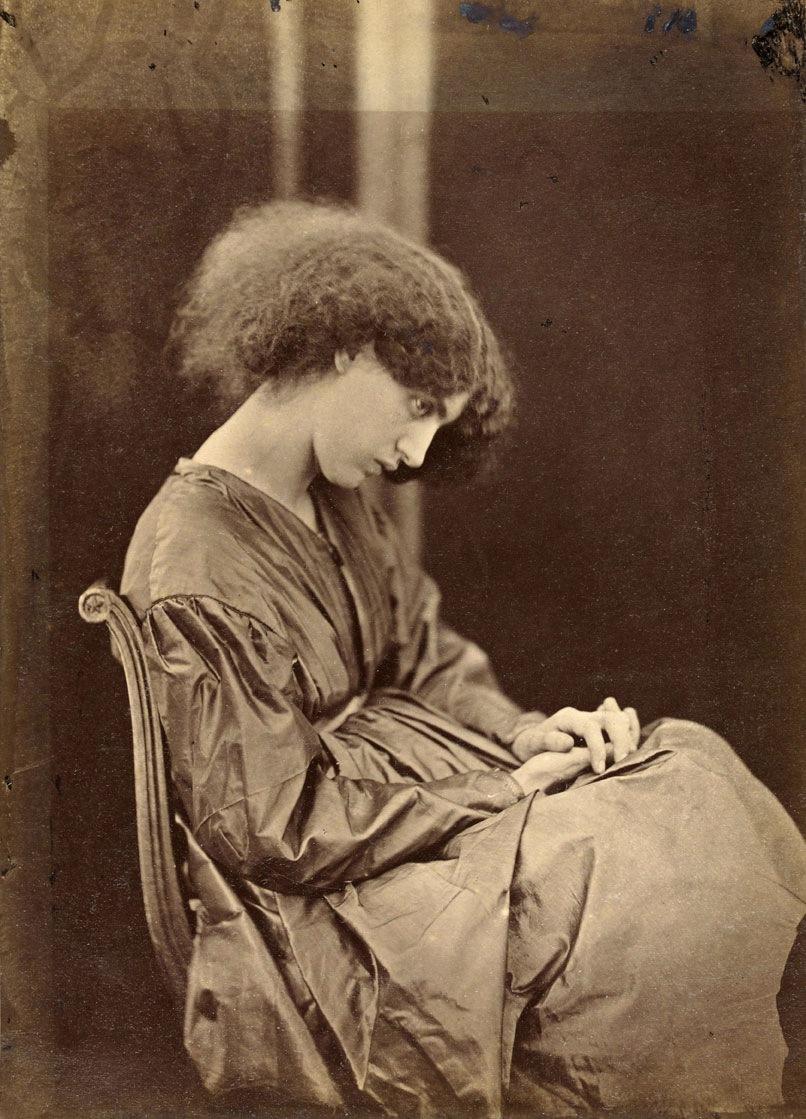

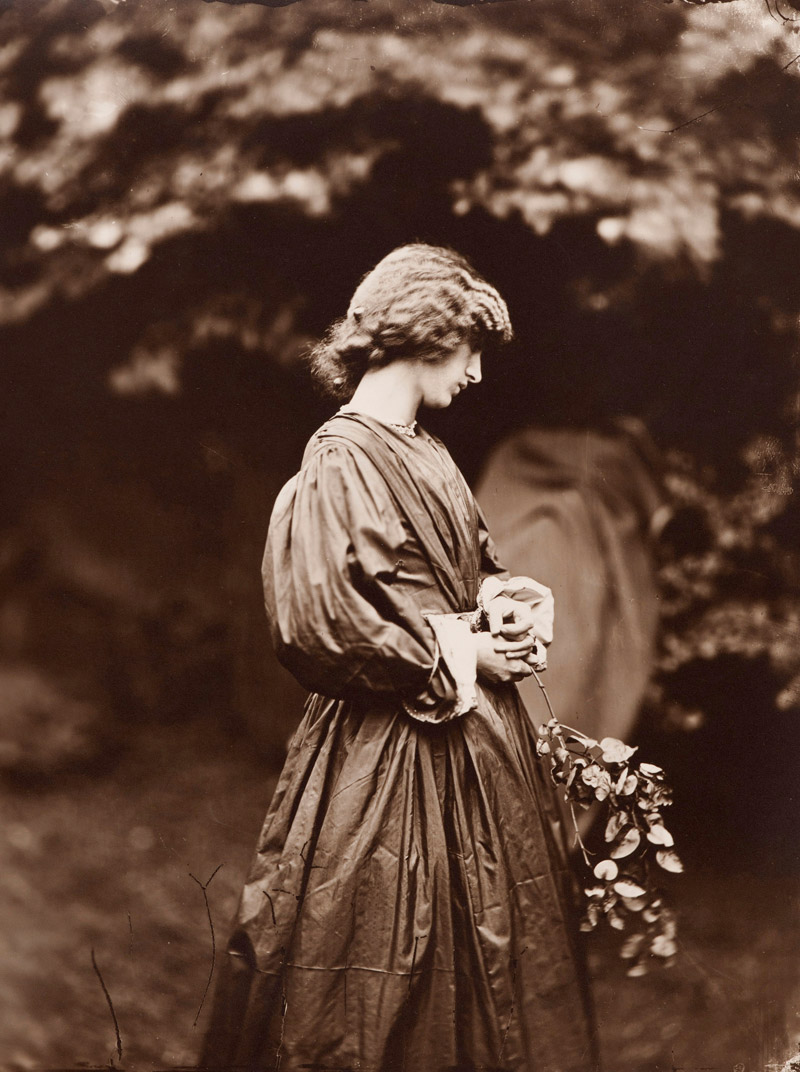

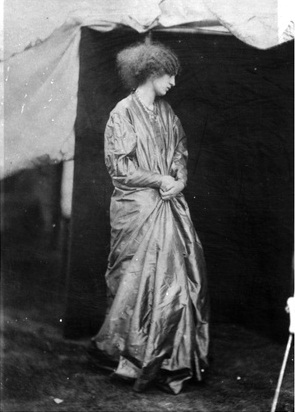

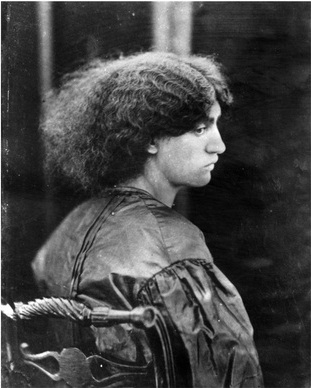

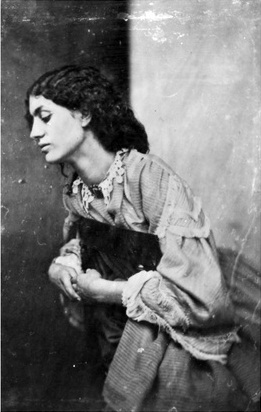

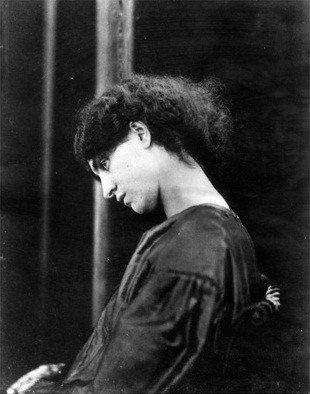

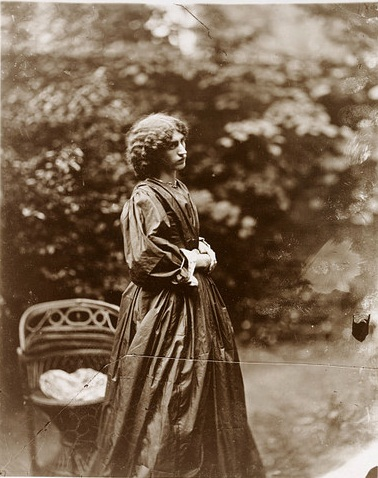

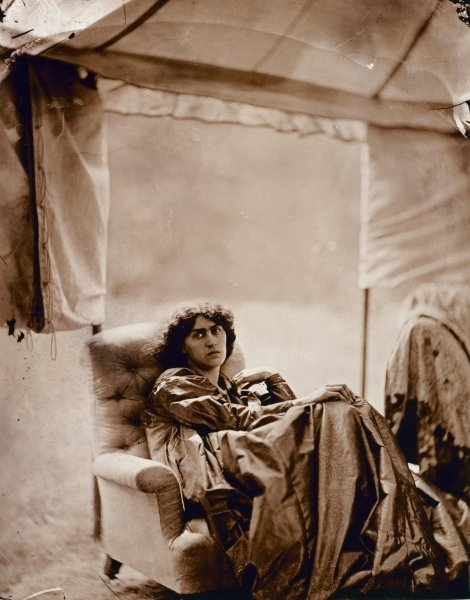

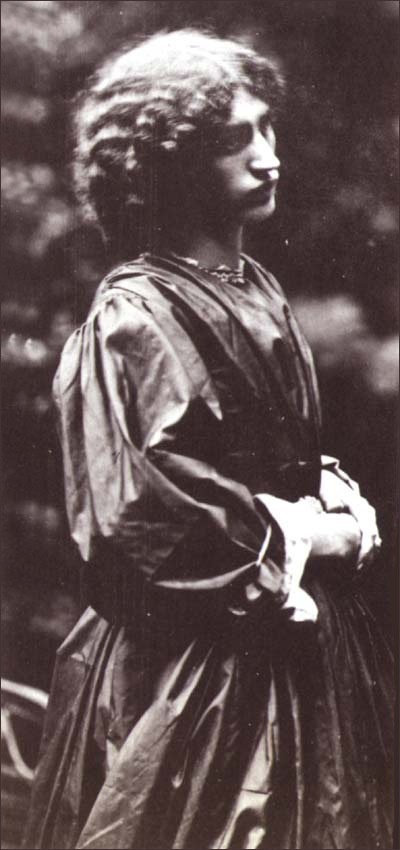

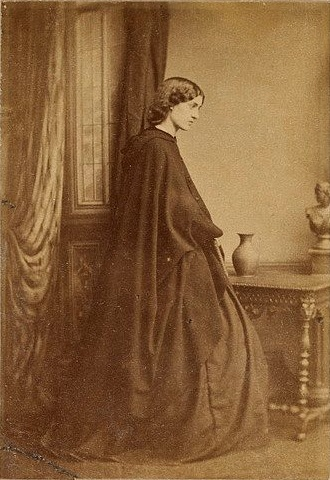

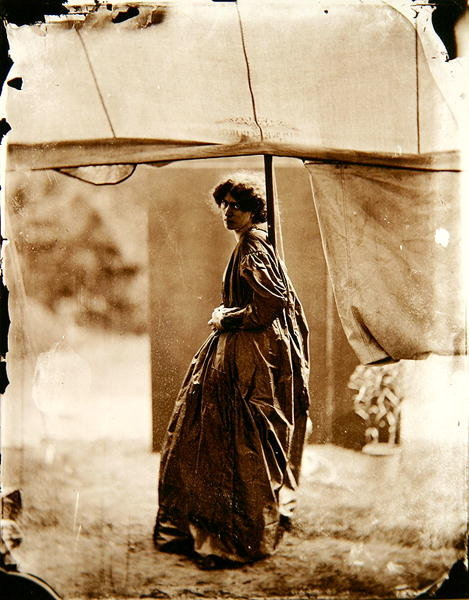
