= Should I Marry a Murderer? =

2026 Netflix true crime documentary series

- Release poster
- Genre: True crime documentary
- Based on: The killing of Tony Parsons
- Starring: Caroline Muirhead
- Country of origin: United Kingdom
- Original language: English
- No. of episodes: 3

Original release
- Network: Netflix
- Release: 29 April 2026

Should I Marry a Murderer? is a 2026 British true crime documentary television miniseries released on Netflix on 29 April 2026. The three-part series tells the story of Caroline Muirhead, a pathologist whose fiancé, the Scottish farmer Alexander "Sandy" McKellar, confessed to her in 2020 that he and his twin brother Robert had killed a cyclist, Tony Parsons, in a 2017 hit-and-run on the A82 near Bridge of Orchy and buried the body on the Auch Estate.

== Synopsis ==
The Netflix synopsis describes the series as the story of "a fiancée turned key witness" who "stayed engaged to a man accused of murder while gathering evidence against him". Through interviews with Muirhead, lead investigators and others connected to the case, the documentary recounts the four-month Tinder romance that led to the McKellars' arrest, the moment of the confession, and Muirhead's covert work with Police Scotland to gather evidence against her partner.

== The killing of Tony Parsons ==
Tony Parsons, a 63-year-old retired Royal Navy officer, cancer survivor and grandfather from Tillicoultry in Clackmannanshire, disappeared on the night of 29 September 2017 while attempting to cycle the 100-mile route from Fort William back to his home in aid of a prostate cancer charity. He was last seen outside the Bridge of Orchy Hotel late that evening, and despite extensive searches by Police Scotland, mountain rescue teams and volunteers, no trace of him was found for more than three years.

Parsons had been struck on the A82 between Bridge of Orchy and Tyndrum by a vehicle driven by Alexander McKellar, a 25-year-old deer-stalker who had been drinking with a German hunting party at a local hotel. The McKellar twins, who lived and worked on the 9,000-acre Auch Estate near Bridge of Orchy, returned home, switched vehicles and went back to collect Parsons and his bicycle; they buried his body in a "stink pit" used to dispose of animal carcasses on the estate, and hid the bicycle behind a waterfall, where it has never been recovered.

In September 2020, Alexander McKellar began a relationship with the forensic pathologist Dr Caroline Muirhead, whom he had met on Tinder. When, two months later, Muirhead asked whether there was anything in his past that could affect their relationship, McKellar confessed to the hit-and-run. Several weeks later he mentioned that there would be a development starting near where the body was buried and so he would have to move the body. McKellar began asking question of Muirhead, such as questions about burning a body. After this Muirhead went to her parents house where they contacted the police and met with detectives. Realising that she didn't know specifically where the body was buried, Muirhead left the house in the early morning to return to the estate to McKellar. She asked to go clay pigeon shooting as he had previously stated that where they went shooting was close to where he had buried Parsons. Once they were there, Muirhead told McKellar that without knowing where the body specifically was, she would not be able to help him. McKellar then showed her the grave site where she secretly left a Red Bull can stamped into the ground at the site as a marker before contacting the police again.

The McKellar brothers were arrested on 30 December 2020 and Parsons's remains were recovered for forensic examination in January 2021. At the High Court in Glasgow on 26 July 2023, Alexander pleaded guilty to culpable homicide and attempting to pervert the course of justice, while Robert pleaded guilty to attempting to pervert the course of justice; on 25 August 2023, Lord Armstrong sentenced Alexander to 12 years in prison and Robert to five years and three months.

== Release ==
The case was previously covered in a two-part arc of the BBC Scotland true-crime series Murder Case titled "The Vanishing Cyclist", which aired in August 2025. Netflix's Should I Marry a Murderer? is the first documentary to be told primarily from Muirhead's perspective. The trailer was released by Netflix on 25 March 2026, ahead of the global premiere on 29 April 2026.

== Reception ==
On the review aggregator website Rotten Tomatoes, the series holds an approval rating of 100%, based on eight reviews.

== See also ==
- List of Netflix original programming
