= Justice Parsons =

Justice Parsons may refer to:

- Frank Nesmith Parsons (1854–1934), chief justice of the New Hampshire Supreme Court
- James M. Parsons (1858–1937), associate justice of the Iowa Supreme Court
- Silas Parsons (c. 1800–1860), associate justice of the Alabama Supreme Court
- Theophilus Parsons (1750–1813), chief justice of the Massachusetts Supreme Judicial Court
