= Donald Parsons =

Donald Parsons may refer to:

- Donald F. Parsons, American former judge
- Donald J. Parsons (1922–2016), American Episcopal bishop
- Donald Parsons (businessman) (1930–2012), American businessman
- Don Parsons (politician), member of the House of Representatives in the U.S. state of Georgia
- Don Parsons (ice hockey) (born 1969), retired professional ice hockey player
