= George Parsons (photographer) =

American photographer

George W. Parsons (c. 1845–1931) was a photographer in Pawhuska, Oklahoma, who photographed the Osage. The Newberry Library in Chicago has a collection of his photographs. The National Museum of American History has a collection of his photographs. His work is also in the Gilcrease Museum. The Wisconsin Historical Society also has his photographs in its collection.

He was born in Arkansas.

He photographed a view of Pawhuska before Oklahoma statehood (Oklahoma Territory) in 1887.

He was involved in a land dispute with a tenant. His businesses with his wife included a millinery, dressmaking store, and his photographic studio.
