= John Parsons (jockey) =

British jockey

Personal information
- Born: c.1845
- Occupation: Jockey

Horse racing career
- Sport: Horse racing

Major racing wins
- Major races Epsom Derby (1862)

Significant horses
- Caractacus

John Parsons was a British jockey and the youngest jockey ever to win The Derby, reportedly aged 16.

Parsons won the race on Caractacus, trained by Bob Smith. Caractacus was an unusual winner of the Derby. He had run and lost three times as a two-year-old, and as a three-year-old, he had been campaigned over races of two miles and more. He thus started the race at odds of 40/1 and was not expected to win. His owner Charles Snewing had interests in another more fancied runner, Spite, and Snewing's main jockey James Goater had been offered the ride on Caractacus, but had opted for Spite instead. This left Caractacus for Parsons, Snewing's stable boy, who had ridden the horse on three previous starts. Despite the low expectations, Caractacus won, Parsons riding the horse with "marvellous coolness and assurance". Parsons is reported to have encouraged his mount by shouting, "Get along, Crackey" and "Good lad, Crackey."

Subsequently, it is said that Parsons disappeared into "utter obscurity". Caractacus was his only ride in the Derby. He would later be found leading horses round the sales ring at Newmarket.

== Major wins ==
(United Kingdom) Great Britain

- Epsom Derby - Caractacus (1862)

== Bibliography ==
- Mortimer, Roger; Onslow, Richard; Willett, Peter (1978). Biographical Encyclopedia of British Flat Racing. Macdonald and Jane’s. ISBN 0-354-08536-0.
- Tanner, Michael; Cranham, Gerry (1992). Great Jockeys of the Flat. Enfield, Middlesex: Guinness Publishing. ISBN 0-85112-989-7.
- Tanner, Michael (2013). The Suffragette Derby. Biteback Publishing.
