= Tony Parsons (Australian author) =

Australian author

Anthony David Parsons is an Australian author and kelpie breeder.

He founded the Kelpie stud “Karrawarra” in 1950 and has gone on to become the breed's most passionate and hardest working advocate. Before that, he was a professional sheep and wool classer. Don Burke said that Tony Parsons has done more to developing the Kelpie as a working dog than anyone else. Kelpie breeder Jan Lowing says that "Parsons (Karrawarra) was responsible for seeking out and preserving Kelpie bloodlines after the fiasco of two World Wars, during which many ‘studs’ disappeared".

Parsons spent time in the Mudgee area 300 km north west of Sydney up to 1972, and based several of his fiction books in the region. He subsequently lived at East Greenmount, Queensland near Toowoomba where his Kelpie stud is located.

== Bibliography ==
=== Novels ===
- The call of the high country (1991) - Penguin, Ringwood Vic, ISBN 9780143202240
- Return to the high country (2001) - Penguin, Ringwood Vic, ISBN 9780143202240
- Silver in the sun (2007) - Viking, Camberwell Vic., ISBN 9780670070312
- The bird smugglers of Mountain View (2008) ISBN 9781921514012
- Valley of the white gold (2011) - Penguin, Camberwell Vic., ISBN 9780143202226
- Back to the Pilliga (2013) - Allen & Unwin, Sydney, ISBN 9781743318805
- Return to Moondilla (2015) - Arena Books, Crows Nest, NSW, ISBN 9781760111465

=== Non-fiction ===
- The Working Kelpie (1986) - Nelson, Melbourne, ISBN 9780170067621
- Training the working kelpie (1990) - Viking O'Neil, Ringwood, Vic., ISBN 0670902470
- The Australian kelpie : the essential guide to the Australian working dog (1992) - Viking O'Neil, Richmond, Vic., ISBN 0670905135
- The kelpie (2010) – Penguin Group Australia, ISBN 9780670073597

== Awards ==
In 1992, he was awarded the prestigious Medal of the Order of Australia for his “contribution to the propagation of the Australian Kelpie sheep dog”.
