= Anthony Parsons (musician) =

English singer-songwriter, producer and entertainer

Anthony Nathan Parsons
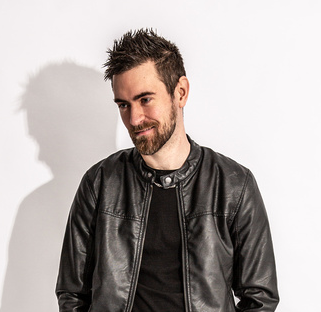
- Parsons in 2019
- Born: 3 November 1989 (age 36); Bolsover, Derbyshire, England
- Style: Pop · Pop rock · Electronic dance
- Website: www.anthonyparsons.co.uk

Anthony Nathan Parsons (born 3 November 1989) is a singer-songwriter, producer, and entertainer from England. He has released eleven singles and one extended play to date.

== Career ==
Growing up, Parsons displayed some musical ability, playing the keyboard and writing snippets of songs.

In 2007, Parsons began his music career by posting videos on YouTube featuring himself singing cover songs. These would be recorded in the style of him sitting and facing a camera whilst singing into a hand-held microphone. Most of these early videos were recorded whilst Parsons was working on a night shift as a security guard and the background in his videos often featured various workplace settings. The first song that Parsons covered was "Your Song" by Elton John. The song was recorded a cappella featuring just Parsons' vocals. He received a positive response to this video which prompted him to record and release more videos onto YouTube.

In 2015, one of Parsons' YouTube videos, featuring a cover of Celine Dion's "I'm Alive", caught the attention of talent scouts in America. They arranged for Parsons to travel to Florida where he performed a number of live shows for them including at the World of Beer Festival in Florida.

== Personal life ==
Parsons was born in Bolsover, Derbyshire, England. He is married and still resides there with two children and two step-children.

He has provided vocals on two charity song releases; "Rise Above It All" in 2020 and also as a guest vocalist on "A Children's Christmas Time" in 2017. This was a charity Christmas single organised by Chesterfield's Spire Radio and featuring various local artists. The single was in aid of both Ashgate Hospicecare and Teenage Cancer Trust.

== Awards ==
=== Roots Live Music Awards 2020 ===
- Best Songwriter – Nominated
- Best Solo Live Act – Nominated
- Best Original Song (Summer Rain) – Nominated

=== Hero of Bolsover Award ===
On 9 September 2020, Parsons was presented with the 'Hero of Bolsover Award' by Bolsover MP Mark Fletcher. This was in recognition of his charity single, "Rise Above It All".

=== GITM Award ===
- Best Solo Male - Won
- Single of The Year (Rise Above It All) - Won
- EP of The Year (The End of The Beginning) - Won
- Special Award (given for his charity single, 'Rise Above It All')
