= Jack Parsons (cricketer) =

English cricketer

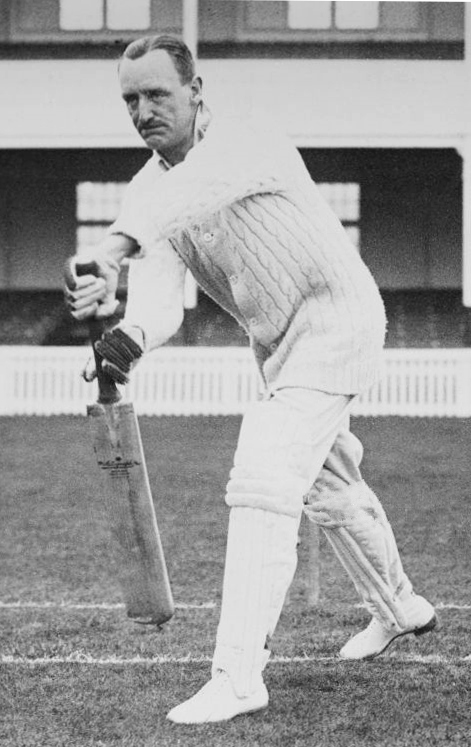
- Parsons in 1924

Personal information
- Full name: John Henry Parsons
- Born: 30 May 1890; Headington, Oxfordshire, England
- Died: 2 February 1981 (aged 90); Plymouth, Devon, England
- Batting: Right-handed
- Bowling: Right-arm medium

Domestic team information
- Years: Team
- 1910 to 1934: Warwickshire
- 1919–20 to 1921–22: Europeans

Career statistics
Competition	First-class
Matches	355
Runs scored	17,969
Batting average	35.72
100s/50s	38/86
Top score	225
Balls bowled
Wickets	83
Bowling average	28.97
5 wickets in innings	3
10 wickets in match	1
Best bowling	7/41
Catches/stumpings	260/0
- Source: ESPNcricinfo, 4 February 2016

The Rev. Canon John Henry Parsons MC (30 May 1890 – 2 February 1981) was an English first-class cricketer for Warwickshire County Cricket Club. A right-handed batsman, he made 17969 runs at 35.72 in his 355-game career which extended over 26 years. He became a Church of England clergyman.

He was born in Oxford, and qualified by residence for Warwickshire County Cricket Club after moving to Coventry. He played for the county from 1910 to 1914 as a professional. He was commissioned into the British Army during the Great War, in which he won a Military Cross for gallantry. He continued in the Army afterwards, appearing for his county as an amateur in 1919 and 1923 as Capt. J. H. Parsons. In 1924, he resumed his professional career. In 1929, he was ordained, and from then until his retirement from the game in 1934 played again as an amateur. According to his obituary in Wisden, he might well have played for England but for the break in his career between 1914 and 1923. "A tall man, who made full use of his height, he was a superb driver of fast bowling, and one of the safest slips of his day."

In his final game for Warwickshire, against Yorkshire at Scarborough in 1934, under his captaincy, 216 runs were required to win in the fourth innings. Parsons scored 94 out of 121 in under two hours, including three 6s and twelve 4s; Warwickshire won by one wicket.

In the 1950s he was vicar of Liskeard in Cornwall. He died in a Plymouth nursing home at the age of 90.
