= Kodacolor (still photography) =

Brand name of an Eastman Kodak film

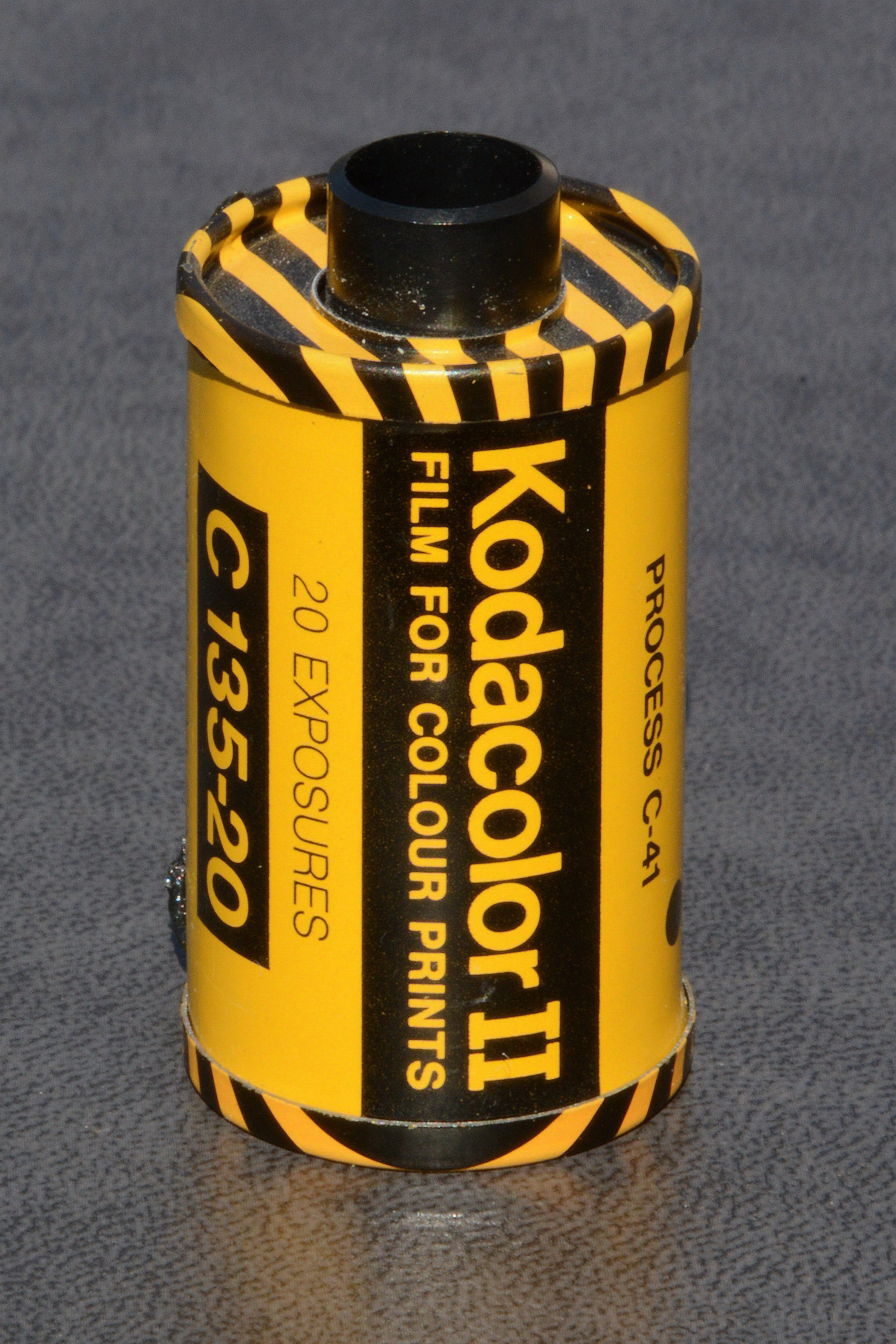
Kodacolor II – 35mm-film for colour prints

In still photography, Kodak's Kodacolor brand has been associated with various color negative films (i.e., films that produce negatives for making color prints on paper) since 1942. Kodak claims that Kodacolor was "the world's first true color negative film". More accurately, it was the first color negative film intended for making paper prints: in 1939, Agfa had introduced a 35 mm Agfacolor negative film for use by the German motion picture industry, in which the negative was used only for making positive projection prints on 35 mm film. There have been several varieties of Kodacolor negative film, including Kodacolor-X, Kodacolor VR and Kodacolor Gold.

The name "Kodacolor" was originally used for a very different lenticular color home movie system, introduced in 1928 and retired after Kodachrome film made it obsolete in 1935.

== Varieties of Kodacolor-branded print film ==
=== Kodacolor ===
Kodacolor
- Speed: 25/15°
- Type: Color
- Process: proprietary, later known as C-22
- Format: 120, 620, 116, 616, 127, 35 mm, 122
- Introduced: 1942
- Discontinued: 1963

The original Kodacolor is a color negative film that was manufactured by Eastman Kodak between 1942 and 1963. It was the first color negative film that they marketed.

When introduced, Kodacolor was sold with the cost of processing the film included, but prints were ordered separately. Both the film and processing procedures were revised through the years. The speed was increased to 32/16° in the 1950s.

After Kodak lost its anti-trust case in 1954, starting in 1955 processing was no longer included in the price of Kodacolor. Kodak made the processing information (by then C-22 process) and chemicals available to other film processing labs.

While Kodacolor film was normally daylight balanced, for a while starting in 1956 it was balanced in-between daylight and tungsten, to allow use indoors, or with clear flash bulbs. This film used the prefix CU. This was not a great success, and the film returned to daylight balance a few years later.

Kodacolor was also available in Type A, balanced for 3400K photolamps. A suffix of A on the type number indicated Type A, such as C828A.

In 1958, Kodak made Kodacolor available in the 35 mm format. Prior to that, the only 35mm color film it offered was Kodachrome.

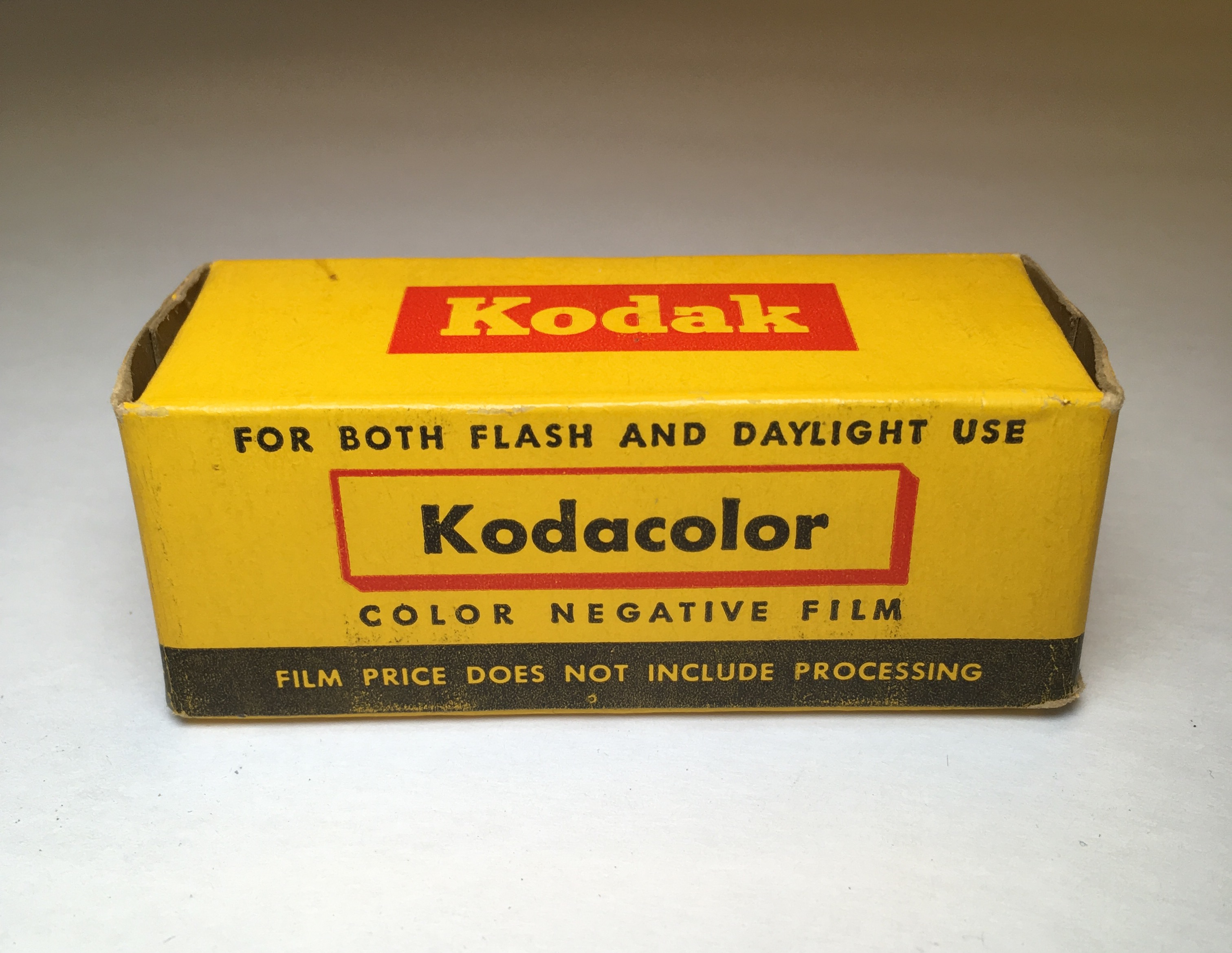
Kodacolor 120 Color Film (Expired: 1957)

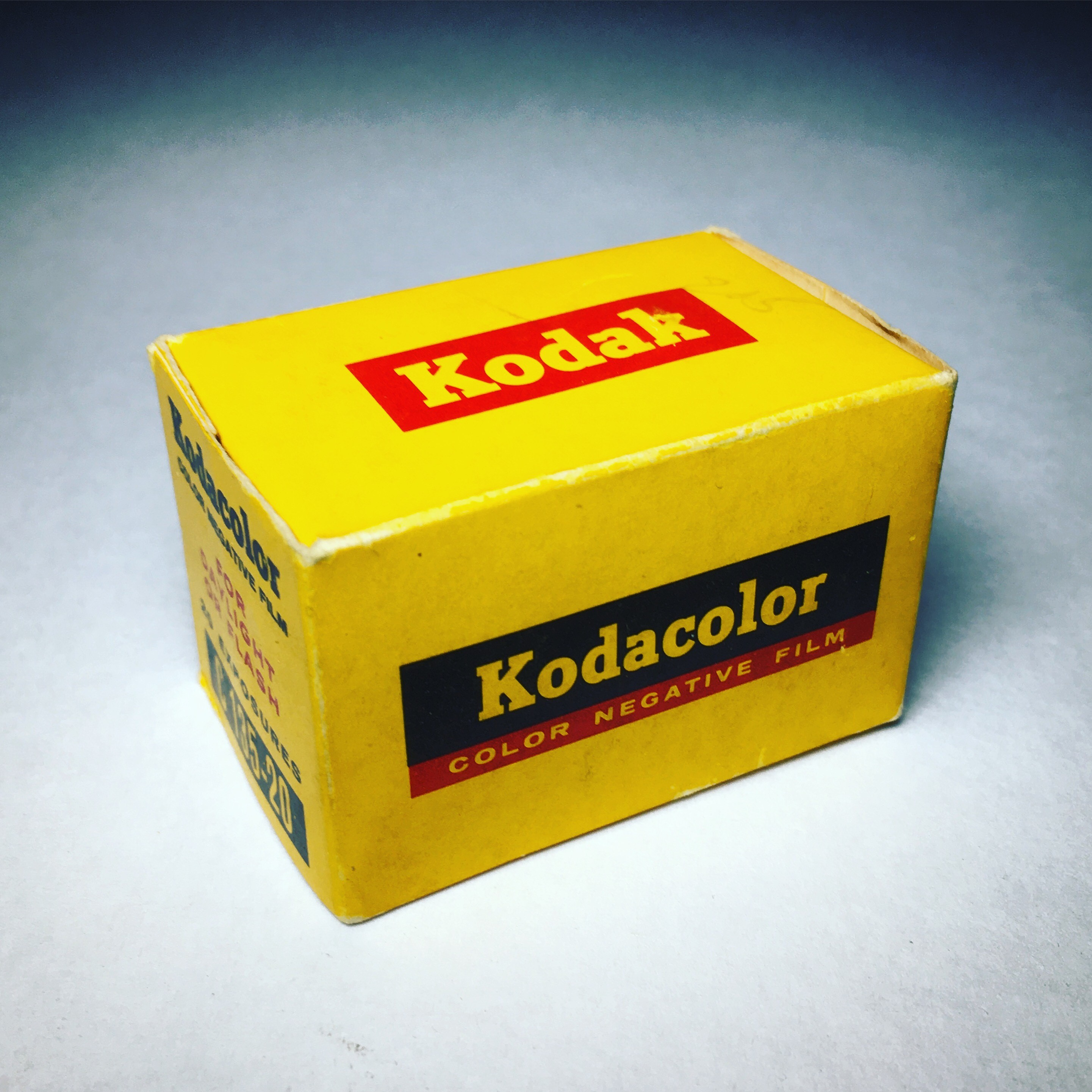
Kodacolor C135-20 Film box, ca. 1960

=== Kodacolor-X ===
Kodacolor-X (CX)
- Speed: 64/19° (early) 80/20° (late)
- Type: Color
- Process: C-22
- Format: 35 mm, 120, 620, 116, 616, 126, 127, 828
- Introduced: 1963
- Discontinued: 1974

Kodacolor-X is a color negative film that was manufactured by Eastman Kodak between 1963 and 1974. It was introduced along with the Kodak Instamatic cameras which use 126 film.

The film was designed to be processed in the C-22 process, which is the predecessor to today's C-41 process.

Only a few specialty labs still process this film, due to the length of discontinuation. Surviving exposed (but unprocessed) Kodacolor-X and C-22 films can still yield color images, although this requires highly specialised development techniques.

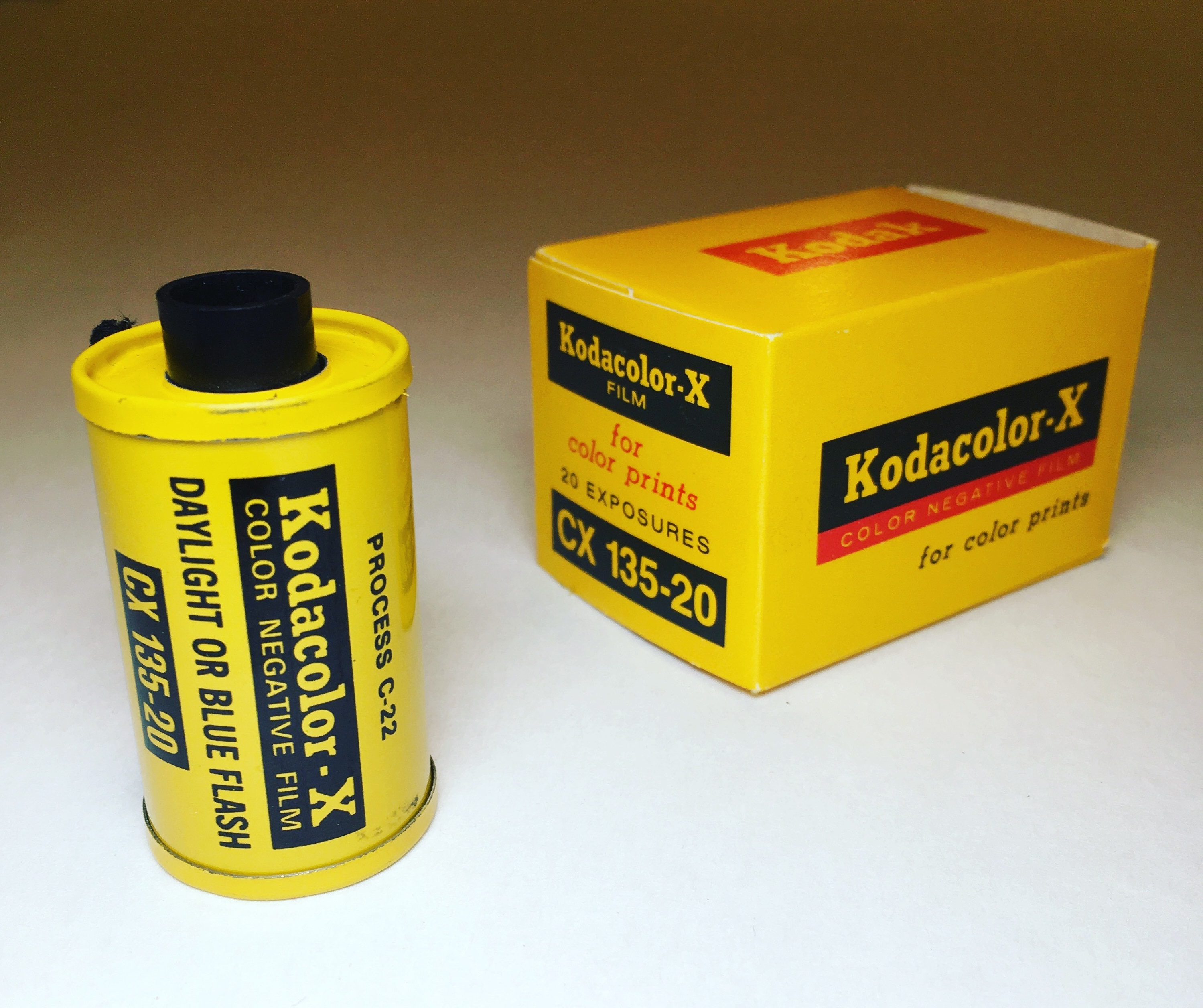
Kodacolor-X 35mm Film Cassette & Box, ca. 1970s

=== Kodacolor II ===
Kodacolor II
- Speed: 80/20° (1972–75) 100/21° (1975–?)
- Type: Color
- Process: C-41
- Format: 110, 35 mm, 120, 620, 116, 616, 126, 127, 828
- Introduced: 1972

Kodacolor II was the first of a new generation of Kodak color negative films using the C-41 process. It was designed as a major improvement to meet the needs of the small 13×17 mm negatives used in 110 film for the Kodak Pocket Instamatic cameras.

The film was initially released in 1972 in the 110 size only, so that non-Kodak processing labs would have time to set up lines using the C-41 process. The other sizes were released in 1973.

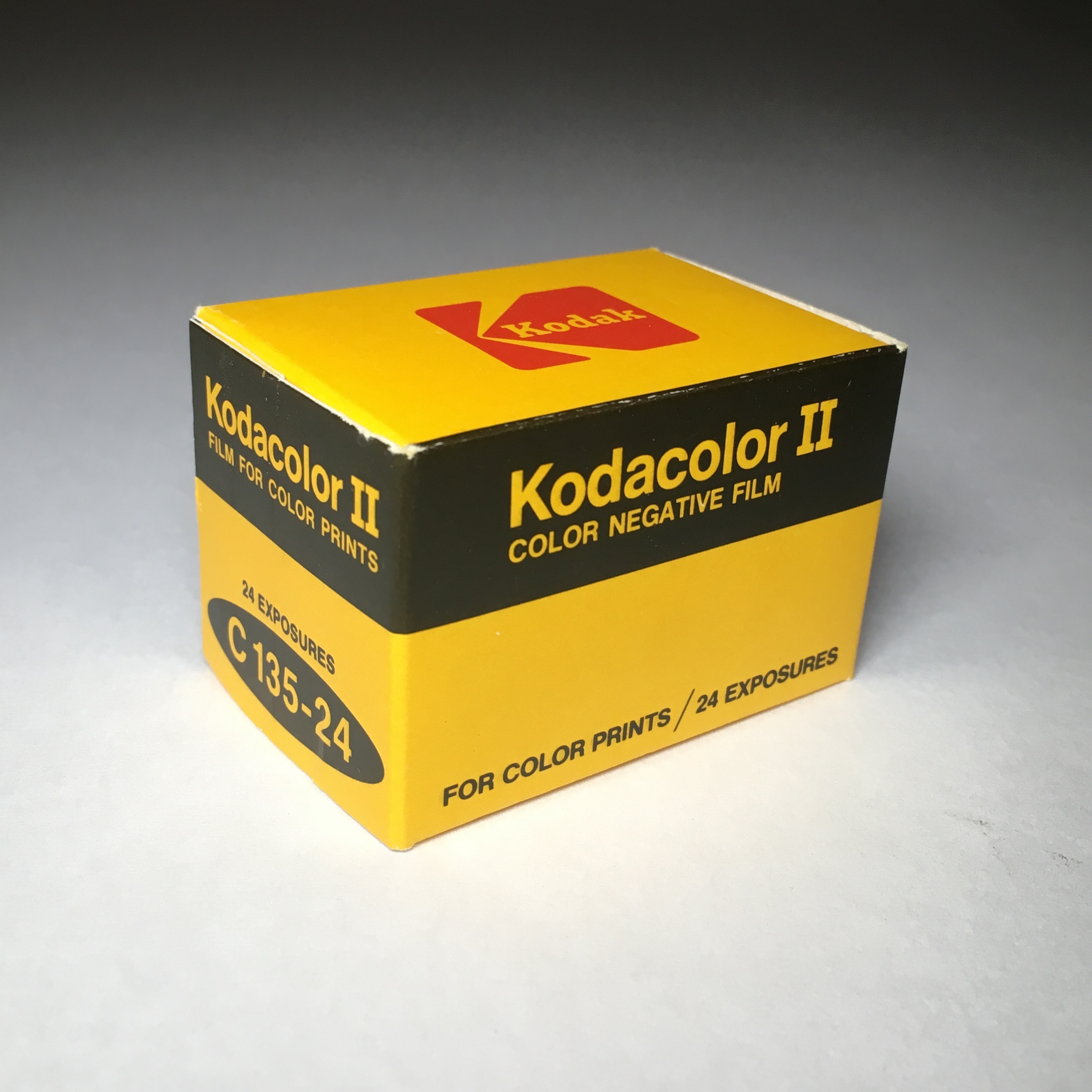
Kodacolor II C 135-24 boxed fim, ca. 1980

=== Kodacolor 400 ===
Kodacolor 400 (CG)
- Speed: 400/27°
- Type: Color
- Process: C-41
- Format: 110, 35 mm, 120
- Introduced: 1977

Kodacolor 400 was available by 1977. It offered a major speed increase over Kodacolor II.

=== Kodacolor HR ===
Kodacolor HR
- Type: Color
- Process: C-41
- Format: Disc
- Introduced: 1982
- Discontinued: 1983

Kodacolor HR was only available in the Disc format. It was Kodak's first color negative film to use their T-Grain technology. The T-Grain technology offers significant reduction in film grain, which is required for the very small 8×11 mm negatives used in the Kodak Disc cameras and film introduced in the same year.

It was also Kodak's first film to use an improved cyan color-coupler, that makes the cyan dye in the negative much more stable

=== Kodacolor VR 1000 ===
Kodacolor VR 1000 (CF)
- Speed: 1000/32°
- Type: Color
- Process: C-41
- Format: 35 mm
- Introduced: 1983
- Discontinued: 1986

Kodacolor VR 1000 was announced in 1982, and available in 1983. This is also a T-Grain film, which makes possible such a high speed film with tolerable grain.

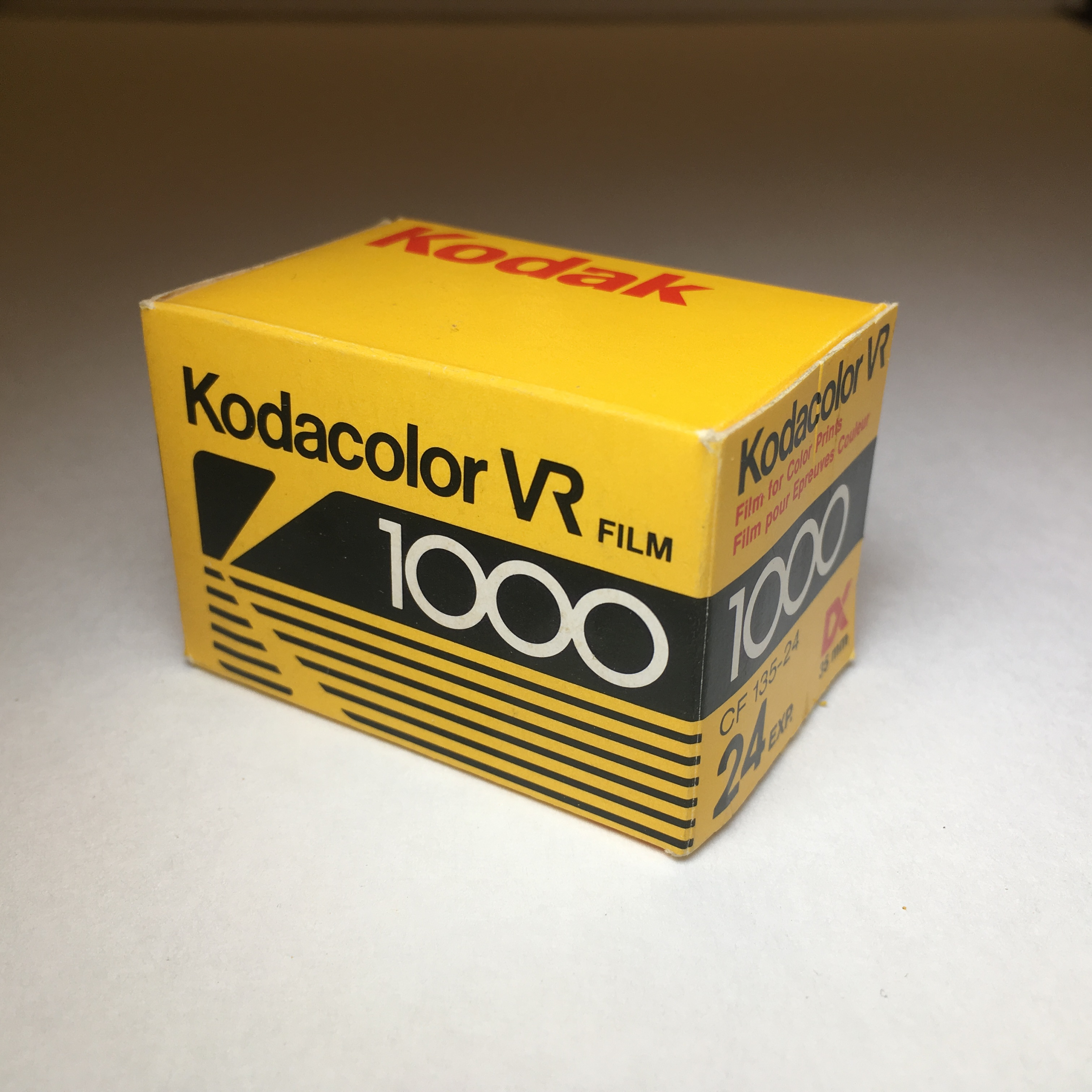
Kodacolor VR 1000 Film

=== Kodacolor VR 100 ===
Kodacolor VR 100 (CP)
- Speed: 100/21°
- Type: Color
- Process: C-41
- Format: 35 mm, 120, 110
- Introduced: 1982
- Discontinued: 1986

Kodacolor VR 100 was introduced along with the 200 and 400 speeds in 1982. This transitioned the entire Kodacolor line of films to T-Grain technology.

The Kodacolor VR films were also Kodak's first to use developer-inhibitor-releaser, which improved edge effects for higher sharpness.

=== Kodacolor VR 200 ===
Kodacolor VR 200 (CL)
- Speed: 200/24°
- Type: Color
- Process: C-41
- Format: 35 mm, 120, 620, 127, 126, Disc
- Introduced: 1982
- Discontinued: 1986

Kodacolor VR 200 uses T-Grain technology. It was also available in the Disc film format (CVR).

VR 200 box (35mm)

=== Kodacolor VR 400 ===
Kodacolor VR 400 (CM)
- Speed: 400/27°
- Type: Color
- Process: C-41
- Format: 35 mm, 120
- Introduced: 1982
- Discontinued: 1986

Kodacolor VR 400 uses T-Grain technology.

=== Kodacolor VR-G 100 ===
Kodacolor VR-G 100 (CA)
- Speed: 100/21°
- Type: Color
- Process: C-41
- Format: 35 mm, 120
- Introduced: 1986

Kodacolor VR-G 100 was later sold as Kodacolor Gold 100.

=== Kodacolor VR-G 200 ===
Kodacolor VR-G 200 (CB)
- Speed: 200/24°
- Type: Color
- Process: C-41
- Format: 35 mm, 120, 127, 126, 110
- Introduced: 1986

Kodacolor VR-G 200 was later sold as Kodacolor Gold 200. It is currently sold as Kodak Gold 200.

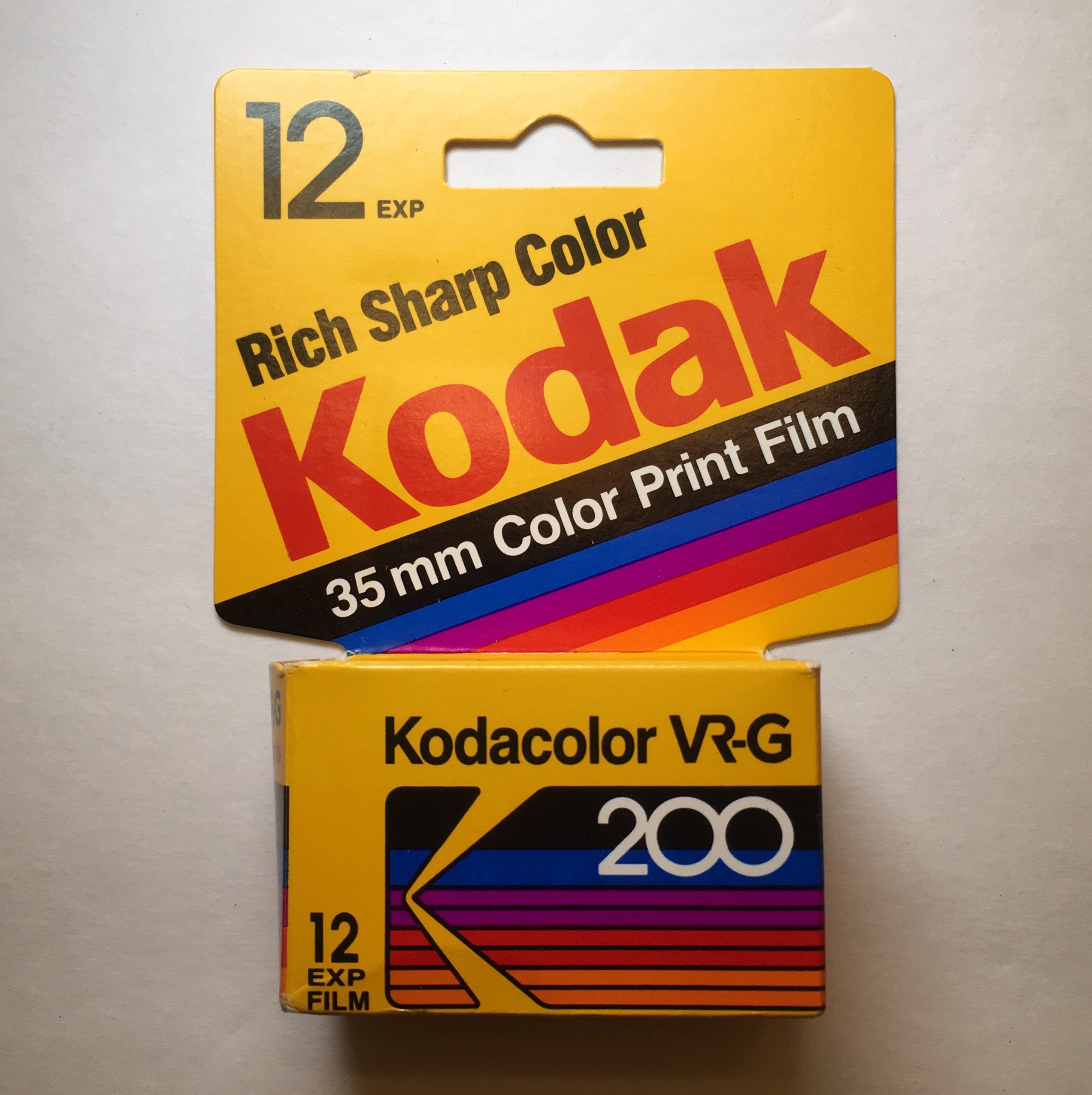
Kodak Gold VR-G 200 Film

=== Kodacolor VR-G 400 ===
Kodacolor VR-G 400 (CC)
- Speed: 400/27°
- Type: Color
- Process: C-41
- Format: 35 mm, 120
- Introduced: 1986

Kodacolor VR-G 400 was later sold as Kodacolor Gold 400.

=== Kodacolor 100 and 200 ===
Kodacolor 100 and 200 is a general purpose film sold by Kodak announced in October 2025.

Kodacolor 100
- Speed: 100/21°
- Type: Color
- Process: C-41
- Format: 35 mm
- Introduced: 2025

Kodacolor 200
- Speed: 200/24°
- Type: Color
- Process: C-41
- Format: 35 mm
- Introduced: 2025

== See also ==
- List of photographic films
- List of discontinued photographic films
