= List of photographic film formats =

This is a list of photographic film formats.

Comparison of the exposed area of common film formats currently sold

== Multiple image ==
Designation (Note: Unless otherwise noted, all formats were introduced by Kodak, which began allocating the number series in 1913. Before that, films were simply identified by the name of the cameras they were intended for.)	Type	Introduced	Introduced By	Discontinued	Image size (in)	Image size (mm)	Exposures	Comment
35	roll film	1916	Kodak	1933	1 1/4 × 1 3/4 in			35 mm stock, unperforated.
50	for roll holder	1915	Kodak	March 1941	3 1/4 × 2 1/4 in			For Graflex roll holder.
51	for roll holder	1915	Kodak	Feb 1951	4 1/4 × 3 1/4 in			For Graflex roll holder.
52	for roll holder	1915	Kodak	Mar 1949	5 1/2 × 3 1/4 in			For Graflex roll holder.
53	for roll holder	1915	Kodak	Feb 1951	5 × 4 in			For Graflex roll holder.
54	for roll holder	1915	Kodak	Mar 1949	7 × 5 in			For Graflex roll holder.
101	roll film	1895	Kodak	1956	3 1/2 × 3 1/2 in	88.9 × 88.9 mm		
102	roll film	1896	Kodak	1933	1 × 2 in	25.4 × 50.8 mm		One flange has gear teeth.
103	roll film	1896	Kodak	1949		100 × 125 mm		
104	roll film	1897	Kodak	1949	4 3/4 × 3 3/4 in	120.65 × 95.25 mm		
105	roll film	1897	Kodak	1949	2 1/4 × 3 1/4 in	57.15 × 82.55 mm		Like 120 film with 116-size flanges.
106	for roll holder	1898	Kodak	1924	3 1/2 × 3 1/2 in	88.9 × 88.9 mm		Roll holder films were wound inside out.
107	for roll holder	1898	Kodak	1924	3 1/4 × 4 1/4 in	82.55 × 107.95 mm		
108	for roll holder	1898	Kodak	1929	4 1/4 × 3 1/4 in	107.95 × 82.55 mm		
109	for roll holder	1898	Kodak	1924	4 × 5 in	101.6 × 127 mm		
110 (early roll film)	for roll holder	1898	Kodak	1929	5 × 4 in	127 × 101.6 mm		No relation to the later 110 cartridge format.
110 ("Pocket Instamatic")	cartridge	1972	Kodak	Present		13 × 17 mm	12, 20, 24	16 mm, registration perforated. Introduced with Kodak "Pocket Instamatic" series. Fujifilm ceased 110 production in 2009. Lomography revived the format in 2011.
111	for roll holder	1898	Kodak	Unknown	6 1/2 × 4 3/4 in	165.1 × 120.65 mm		Possibly discontinued 1924 or 1929.
112	for roll holder	1898	Kodak	1924	7 × 5 in	177.8 × 127 mm		
113	for roll holder	1898	Kodak	Unknown		90 × 120 mm		Possibly discontinued 1924 or 1929.
114	for roll holder	1898	Kodak	Unknown		120 × 90 mm		Possibly discontinued 1924 or 1929.
115	roll film	1898	Kodak	1949	6 3/4 × 4 3/4 in	171.45 × 120.65 mm		
116	roll film	1899	Kodak	1984	2 1/2 × 4 1/4 in	65 × 110 mm	8	Like 616 film with wider flanges.
117	roll film	1900	Kodak	1949	2 1/4 × 2 1/4 in	60 × 60 mm	6	Like 620 spool with 120 keyslot.
118	roll film	1900	Kodak	1961	3 1/4 × 4 1/4 in	80 × 105 mm	6	3.474-inch spool.
119	roll film	1900	Kodak	1940	4 1/4 × 3 1/4 in	107.95 × 82.55 mm		
120	roll film	1901	Kodak	Present	2 1/4 × 3 1/4 in 2 1/4 × 2 1/4 in 2 1/4 × 1 5/8 in	60 × 90 mm 60 × 70 mm 60 × 60 mm 60 × 45 mm	8; 10; 12; 15–16	2.4 inch (60.96 mm) stock, unperforated, paper-backed.
121	roll film	1902	Kodak	1941	1 5/8 × 2 1/2 in			
122	roll film	1903	Kodak	1971	3 1/4 × 5 1/2 in	80 × 140 mm	6 or 10	Postcard format.
123	roll film	1904	Kodak	1949	4 × 5 in	101.6 × 127 mm		
124	roll film	1905	Kodak	1961	3 1/4 × 4 1/4 in	80 × 105 mm	6	3.716-inch spool: same picture size as 118 with longer spool.
125	roll film	1905	Kodak	1949	3 1/4 × 5 1/2 in	82.55 × 139.7 mm		like 122 on longer spool; also for stereo pairs, 3 1/4 in × 2 1/2 in × 2.
126 (early roll film)	roll film	1906	Kodak	1949	4 1/4 × 6 1/2 in	107.95 × 165.1 mm		No relation to the 126 cartridge format introduced in 1963.
126 ("Instamatic")	cartridge	1963	Kodak	2008		28 × 28 mm	12, 20, later 24	35 mm stock, registration perforated Introduced with first "Instamatic" cameras under the name "Kodapak".
127	roll film	1912	Kodak	Present	1 5/8 × 2 1/2 in 1 5/8 × 1 5/8 in 1 5/8 × 1 1/4 in	40 × 65 mm 40 × 40 mm 40 × 30 mm	8; 12; 16	46 mm stock, "Vest Pocket".
128	roll film	1912		1941	1 1/2 × 2 1/4 in	38.1 × 57.15 mm		For Houghton Ensignette #E1.
129	roll film	1912		1951	1 7/8 × 3 in	50 × 75 mm	6	For Houghton Ensignette #E2.
130	roll film	1916	Kodak	1961	2 7/8 × 4 7/8 in	72.5 × 125 mm	6	
135	cartridge	1934	Kodak	Present		24 × 36 mm	24 or 36	35 mm stock, double perforated. Formerly available in 12, 18, 20, or 72 exposures. By far the most popular format since the mid-1960s.
220	roll film	1965	Kodak	Present	2 1/4 × 3 1/4 in 2 1/4 × 2 1/4 in 2 1/4 × 1 5/8 in	60 × 90 mm 60 × 70 mm 60 × 60 mm 60 × 45 mm	18; 21; 24–27; 30–33	2.4-inch (60.96 mm) stock, unperforated, no backing paper Twice as long as 120. Final films in 220 were professional films for commercial/wedding photography; Kodak Portra (2015) and Fujifilm Colour Negative and Reversal (2017 in Japan only). Ilford ceased 220 production in 2004 after their 220 spooling plant broke down. SHANGHAI JIANCHENG is now making 220 film.
235	loading spool	1934	Kodak	Unknown		24 × 36 mm		35 mm film in daylight-loading spool.
240 / APS	cartridge	1996	Kodak	2011		30.2 × 16.7 mm	15, 25, 40	24 mm stock, registration perforated.
335	stereo pairs	1952	Kodak	Unknown		24 × 24 mm	20 pairs	Special length for Realist format stereo pairs.
435	loading spool	1934	Kodak	Unknown		24 × 36 mm		35 mm film in daylight-loading spool.
500	film pack	1911	Kodak	1948	1 3/4 × 2 3/8 in	45 × 60 mm	12 sheets	Redefined in 1921 as 1 5/8 × 2 7/16 in.
515	film pack	1905	Kodak	1955	5 × 7 in	130 × 180 mm	12 sheets	
516	film pack	1909	Kodak	1955	2 1/2 × 4 1/4 in	65 × 110 mm	12 sheets	
518	film pack	1903	Kodak	1976	3 1/4 × 4 1/4 in	80 × 105 mm	12 sheets	
520	film pack	1906	Kodak	1976	2 1/4 × 3 1/4 in	60 × 90 mm	16 sheets	
522	film pack	1904	Kodak	1955	3 1/4 × 5 1/2 in	80 × 140 mm	12 sheets	3A postcard
523	film pack	1904	Kodak		4 × 5 in	100 × 125 mm	12 sheets	
526	film pack	1920	Kodak	1941	4 3/4 × 6 1/2 in			
531	film pack	1926	Kodak	1941	2 9/32 × 5 11/32 in	60 × 130 mm		
540	film pack	1920	Kodak	1941	1 3/4 × 4 1/4 in	45 × 107 mm		
541	film pack	1920	Kodak	1941	3 1/2 × 4 3/4 in	90 × 120 mm	12 sheets	
542	film pack	1911	Kodak	1948	3 × 5 1/4 in	75 × 135 mm		
543	film pack	1920	Kodak	1948	3 3/4 × 5 1/2 in	100 × 150 mm	12 sheets	
616	roll film	1931	Kodak	1984	2 1/2 × 4 1/4 in 2 1/2 × 2 1/8 in	65 × 110 mm 65 × 55 mm	6, later 8	Similar to 116 film but on a thinner spool.
620	roll film	1932	Kodak	1995	2 1/4 × 3 1/4 in 2 1/4 × 2 1/4 in 2 1/4 × 1 5/8 in	60 × 90 mm 60 × 60 mm 60 × 45 mm	8; 12; 16	Similar to 120 film but on a thinner spool.
828	roll film	1935	Kodak	1985		28 × 40 mm	8	35 mm, one perforation per frame. Introduced with the Kodak Bantam camera.
635	loading spool	1960s	Comecon	1990s		24 × 36 mm	36	Comecon designation for 35mm film on daylight loading spool.
935	loading spool	1960s	Comecon	1990s		24 × 36 mm	36	Comecon designation for 1.6m long 35mm film for loading in the darkroom.
35-1	loading spool	c1950	FOTON	c1980		24 × 36 mm	36	"35 type 1", polish designation for 35mm darkroom loading roll (935 format).
35-2	loading spool	c1950	FOTON	1960s		24 × 36 mm	18	"35 type 2", polish designation of 80cm long 35mm film for darkroom loading. Half of standard 1.6m long 35mm film.
35-3	loading spool	c1950	FOTON	c1980		24 × 36 mm	36	"35 type 3", polish designation for 35mm daylight loading spool (635 format).
35-4	cartridge	c1950	FOTON	c1980		24 × 36 mm	36	"35 type 4", polish designation for 135 film.
35-5	loading spool	c1950	FOTON	c1980		24 × 36 mm	36	"35 type 5", polish designation for box of 10 darkroom loading rolls.
35-6	bulk roll	c1950	FOTON	c1980		24 × 36 mm	n/a	"35 type 6", polish designation for 17m bulk roll of 35mm film.
40	roll film	c1950	FOTON	c1980	1 5/8 × 2 1/2 in 1 5/8 × 1 5/8 in 1 5/8 × 1 1/4 in	40 × 65 mm 40 × 40 mm 40 × 30 mm	8; 12; 16	Polish designation for 127 roll film.
60-1	roll film	c1950	FOTON	c1980	2 1/4 × 3 1/4 in 2 1/4 × 2 1/4 in 2 1/4 × 1 5/8 in	60 × 90 mm 60 × 60 mm 60 × 45 mm	8; 12; 16	"60 type 1", polish designation for 120 roll film.
60-2	roll film	c1950	FOTON	c1980	2 1/4 × 3 1/4 in 2 1/4 × 2 1/4 in 2 1/4 × 1 5/8 in	60 × 90 mm 60 × 60 mm 60 × 45 mm	8; 12; 16	"60 type 2", polish designation for 620 roll film.
Op 4, Op 8	roll film	Unknown	Agfa	Unknown		75 × 105 mm	4 or 8	Roll film format for Agfa Billy Optima camera. Early Agfacolor was sold in 4 exp., other films in 8 exp.
R 12	roll film	Unknown	Agfa	Unknown	3/4 × 3/4 in		12	Agfa roll film format probably for the US market.
Karat	cartridge	1936	Agfa	1948		24 × 36 mm	12	Early Agfa cartridge for 35 mm film.
Rapid	cartridge	1964	Agfa	1990s		24 × 24 mm 18 × 24 mm	12; 16	Agfa cartridge for 35 mm film (replaced Karat, same system).
UniveX #00	roll film	1933	Gevaert		1 1/2 × 1 1/8 in		6	Made by Gevaert.
Hit (for example TONE camera)	roll film	1937	Kodak	Unknown		14 × 14 mm	10	17.5 mm stock; used in imported miniature toy cameras.
Half-frame	cartridge	1934, later than	Kodak	Present		18 × 24 mm	48 or 72	135 film in "half-frame" cameras.
Disc	cartridge	1982	Kodak	1998		8 × 11 mm	15	Circular sheet of film attached to rigid carrier in a plastic cartridge.
Minox	cartridge	1938	Minox	Present		8 × 11 mm	15, 36, 50	Nominally 9.5 mm-wide stock (in reality 9.2–9.3 mm).
SL	cartridge	1958	ORWO	1994		24 × 36 mm 24 × 24 mm 18 × 24 mm	12; 16; 24	ORWO Schnell-Lade Kassette for 35 mm film. Similar to Agfa Karat/Rapid.
Kassette 16	cartridge	1978	ORWO	1991		13 × 17 mm	20	ORWO Kassette 16, 16 mm, perforation in the middle between frames. Eastern bloc 110 cartridge-like format.
Super 16 (Rollei)	cartridge	1963	Rollei	1981		12 × 17 mm	18	Rollei, Super 16 mm, single perforation. Produced by Rollei from existing film stocks for the Rollei 16 camera. Also Wirgin Edixa 16 (Franka/alka 16).
Mikroma	cartridge	1946	Meopta	c1970		11 × 14 mm (single perf.); 10 × 14 mm (double perf.)	36, 50	16 mm film, single or double perforated, in a reusable cartridge for the Meopta Mikroma camera. Film strip could be up to 90 cm long (50 exp.).
Minolta-16	cartridge	1955	Minolta	1974		10 × 14 mm (original); 13 × 17 mm (later)	20	Minolta, 16 mm, originally double perforated (single perforated or unperforated film could be loaded), later single perforation to allow larger 13 × 17 mm image.

For roll holder means film for cartridge roll holders, allowing roll film to be used with cameras designed to use glass plates. These were spooled with the emulsion facing outward, rather than inward as in film designed for native roll-film cameras. Types 106 to 114 were for Eastman-Walker rollholders, while types 50 to 54 were for Graflex rollholders.

The primary reason there were so many different negative formats in the early days was that prints were made by contact, without use of an enlarger. The film format would thus be exactly the same as the size of the print—so if you wanted large prints, you would have to use a large camera and corresponding film format.

== Roll film cross-reference table ==
Before World War II, each film manufacturer used its own system of numbering for the various sizes of roll films they made. The following sortable table shows the corresponding numbers. A blank space means that manufacturer did not make film in that size. Two numbers in one box refers to films available with different numbers of exposures, usually 6 and either 10 or 12. Spool length is measured between inner faces of the flanges; several films of the same image size were available on different spools to fit different cameras.

Eastman	Agfa	Zeiss	Ansco	Ensign	Vulcan	Seneca	Rexo	Spool length (in)
101	H6		8A, 8B	3 1/2-inch	202	303		3.661
102			1B	1 1/2-inch	204			1.655
103	K6		10A, 10B	4-inch	206			3.912
104	L6		12A, 12B	5-inch	208			5.064
105	C6		5A, 5B	2 1/4-inch C	210	315		2.509
115			13A, 13B	7-inch	230			7.126
116	D6, D8	D8	6A, 6B	2 1/2-inch	232	348	425, 426	2.814
117	B1-6	BI	3A	2 1/4-inch A	234			2.470
118	E6	E	7A, 7B	3 1/4-inch	236	354	430, 431	3.474
119			11A, 11B	4 1/4-inch	238			4.490
120	B2-6, B2-8	BII-8	4A	2 1/4-inch B	240	360	415	2.466
121	AB6		2A, 2B	1 5/8-inch	242			1.850
122	G6, G10	G	18A, 18B	3 1/4-inch A	244	366	445, 446	3.715
123	J6		10C, 10D	4-inch A	246			4.693
124	F6		7C, 7D	3 1/4-inch B	248	372	435	3.716
125			18C, 18D	3 1/4-inch C	250	375		3.912
126			19A	4 1/4-inch A	252			4.898
127	A8	A8	2C	Ensignette 1J	254	381	407	1.860
128	O6			Ensignette 1				1.606
129	N6	N		Ensignette 2				2.059
130	M6		26A, 26B	2 7/8-inch	260	390	436, 438	3.132
616	PD16	DM8						2.814
620	PB20, K20	BII-D8						2.468

== Single image ==
Size (inches)	Type
1 5/8 × 2 1/8	"sixteenth-plate" tintypes
2 × 2 1/2	"ninth-plate" tintypes
2 × 3	sheet film
2 1/4 × 3 1/4	sheet film
2 1/2 × 3 1/2	"sixth-plate" tintypes
3 × 4	sheet film
3 1/8 × 4 1/8	"quarter-plate" tintypes
3 1/4 × 4 1/4	sheet film, "quarter-plate" glass plates
3 1/4 × 5 1/2	postcard or 3A
4 × 5	glass plate, sheet film
4 × 10	sheet film
4 1/4 × 5 1/2	"half-plate" tintypes
4 3/4 × 6 1/2	"half-plate" glass plates, sheet film
5 × 7	sheet film
6 1/2 × 8 1/2	"whole-plate" glass plates, sheet film, tintypes
7 × 17	sheet film
8 × 10	glass plates, sheet film
8 × 20	sheet film
11 × 14	sheet film
12 × 20	sheet film
14 × 17	sheet film
16 × 20	sheet film
20 × 24	sheet film

Size (cm)	Type
6.5 × 9	glass plate, sheet film
6 × 13	sheet film
9 × 12	glass plate, sheet film
10 × 12	glass plate
10 × 15	glass plate, sheet film
12 × 15	glass plate
12 × 16,5	glass plate, sheet film
13 × 18	glass plate, sheet film
18 × 24	glass plate, sheet film
24 × 30	glass plate, sheet film
30 × 40	glass plate

== Instant film ==
Designation	Type	Introduced	Discontinued	Image size	Exposures	Comment
Type 20	Polaroid roll film cartridge	1965	1979	2 1/8 × 2 7/8 in	8	
Type 30	Polaroid roll film cartridge	1954	1979	2 1/8 × 2 7/8 in	8	
Type 40	Polaroid roll film cartridge	1948	1972 (color); 1992 (monochrome)	2 7/8 × 3 3/4 in	6 or 8	
Type 50	Polaroid peel-apart film pack	19??	2008	4 × 5 in		Including Type 55
Type 80	Polaroid peel-apart film pack	1971	2006	2 3/4 × 2 7/8	8 or 10	
Type 100	Polaroid peel-apart film pack	1963	2016 by Fujifilm. Reintroduced in 2018	2 7/8 × 3 3/4 in	8, 10 or 11	Discontinued by Polaroid in 2008. Produced and sold by Fujifilm until 2016, when it was discontinued. New 100 type film made by One Instant introduced in 2018
SX-70, Type 600	Polaroid integral film pack	1972	–	3 1/8 × 3 1/8 in	8 or 10	Discontinued by Polaroid in 2008; reintroduced by Impossible Project in 2010.
Kodak Instant	Kodak integral film pack	1976	1986	91 × 67 mm	10	
F Series	Fuji integral film pack	1981	c. 1990	91 × 69 mm		Film compatible with Kodak Instant, but in a different cartridge and rated at a (slightly) different speed
Kodamatic	Kodak integral film pack	c. 1980	1986	91 × 67 mm	10	
Trimprint, Instagraphic	Kodak peel-apart film pack	1983	1986	4 × 3 1/2 in	10	
System 800	Fuji integral film pack		2010	91 × 69 mm		
Spectra, Type 700, Type 1200	Polaroid integral film pack	1986	Oct. 2019	3 5/8 × 2 7/8 in	10 or 12 with original Polaroid; 8 with Polaroid Originals/Impossible Project	Discontinued by Polaroid in 2008; reintroduced by Impossible Project in 2010; discontinued by Polaroid Originals in 2019.
Captiva, Type 500	Polaroid integral film pack	1993	2006	2 7/8 × 2 1/8 in	10	
InstantACE	Fuji integral film pack		2010	91 × 69 mm		
8 × 10	Polaroid film pack	19??	–	8 × 10 in	1	Discontinued by Polaroid; reintroduced by Impossible Project.
i-Zone; Pocket	Polaroid integral film pack	1997	2006	36 × 24 mm	12	
Fujifilm Instax Mini, PolaroidMio, PolaroidType 300	Fuji/Polaroid integral film pack	1998	–	46 × 62 mm	10	
Instax Wide	Fuji integral film pack	1999	–	99 × 62 mm	10	
Instax Pivi	Fuji integral film pack	2004	–	46 × 61 mm		
I-Type	Impossible integral film pack	2016	–	3 1/8 × 3 1/8 in	8	Same image format as Polaroid Type 600, but the film cartridge does not contain a battery
Instax Square	Fuji integral film pack	2017	–	62 × 62 mm	10	
Go	Polaroid integral film pack	2021	–	2.12 × 2.62 in	8	The film cartridge does not contain a battery

== See also ==
- List of photographic films
- List of motion picture film formats
