= 126 film =

Cartridge-based film format used in still photography

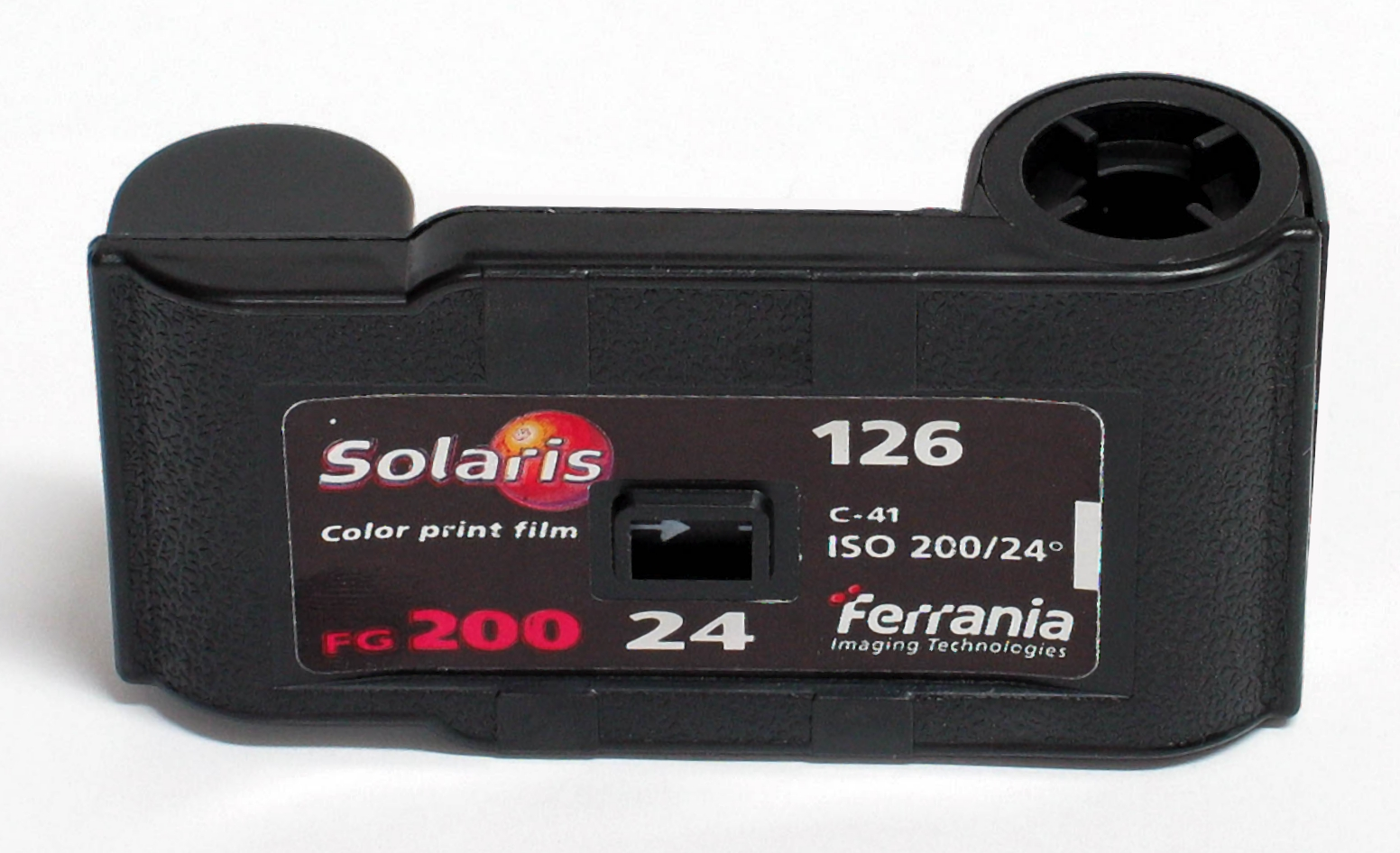
The 126 film cartridge.

126 film is a cartridge-based film format used in still photography. It was introduced by Kodak in 1963, and is associated mainly with low-end point-and-shoot cameras, particularly Kodak's own Instamatic series of cameras.

Although 126 was once very popular, as of 2008 it is no longer manufactured, however, most photofinishers can process it using standard day load roll film cassettes.

== Technical details ==
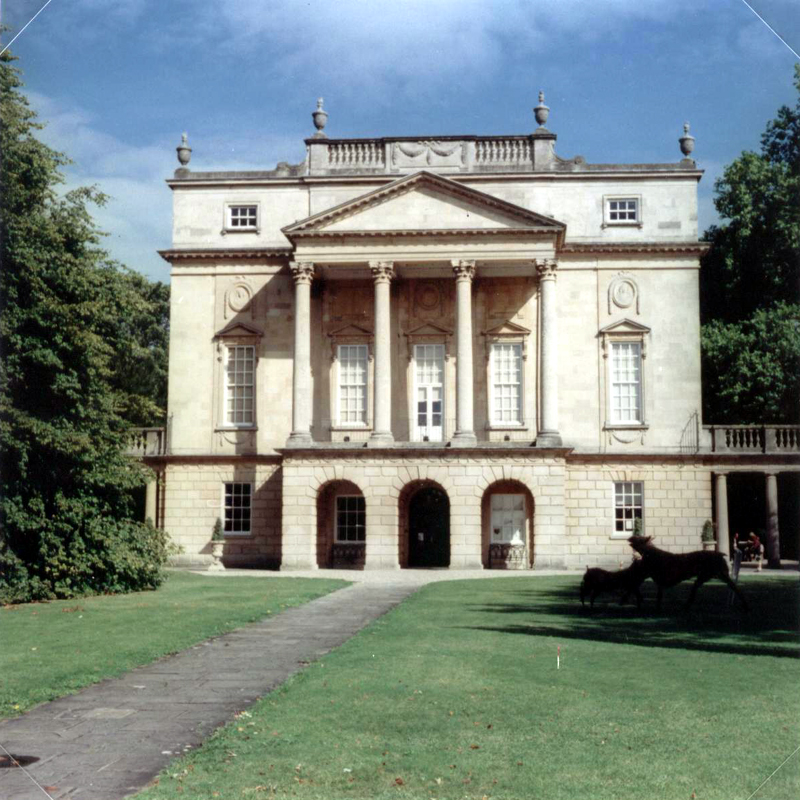
A photo of the Holburne Museum of Art, Bath, taken with 126 film and illustrating the square format.

In 1963, Kodak introduced a new film, encased in a plastic cartridge, for which they re-introduced the "126" designation. (The number was originally used for the unrelated 126 roll film format from 1906 to 1949). The term "126" was intended to show that 26 mm square images were recorded, using Kodak's common 1xx film numbering system. However the image size is actually 28×28 mm, which usually was reduced to approximately 26.5×26.5 mm by masking during printing or mounting. At the nominal 28 mm square size, the image diagonal is 39.6 mm, which is close to the 43.3 mm diagonal of a 135 film frame (24×36 mm); the crop factor or equivalent focal length multiplier is 1.09 based on the diagonal measurements.

The 126 film cartridge and format were defined in ISO 3029, which has since been withdrawn.

Like the 120 format, there is a continuous backing paper, and the frame number is visible through a small window at the rear of the cartridge. Cameras for this type of film are equipped with a large rectangular window in the back door, through which is visible not only the frame number, but also a portion of the label showing the film type and speed. The cartridge has a captive take-up spool, but no supply spool: the film and backing paper are simply coiled tightly and placed in the supply end of the cartridge. The positioning of the image is fixed by the cartridge. The film is 35 mm wide, but unlike 135 film, it is unperforated, except for one registration hole per image, similar to the earlier 828 film. The camera is equipped with a sensing pin which falls into this hole when the film is fully advanced to the next frame, at which point the winding knob or lever is locked, so as to prevent winding past the pre-exposed frame lines.

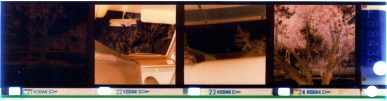
A strip of 126 negatives, showing the square format and single perforation. The film is pre-exposed with frame lines and numbers, a feature intended to make printing and viewing easier.

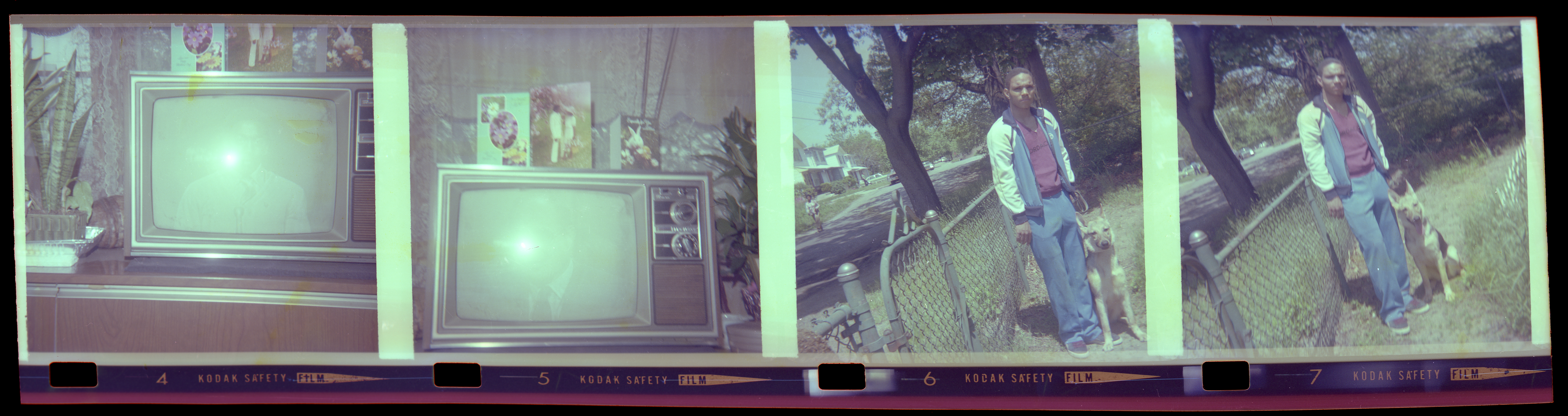
126 negative strip (converted to positive) with numbered leaders on a roll of 20 exposures from the 1970s showing the manufacturer text "Kodak Safety Film" indicating acetate base (non-nitrate).

The top edge of the cartridge above the film gate has a square notch in a specific position that signaled the film speed. Some of the higher-end cameras used this notch to determine the correct exposure, or to set the light meter, if so equipped. Although the actual films manufactured in 126 cartridge format had speeds varying between ISO 64/19° and ISO 400/27°, the standard defined 20 different speeds, spanning from ISO 20/14° to ISO 1600/33°.

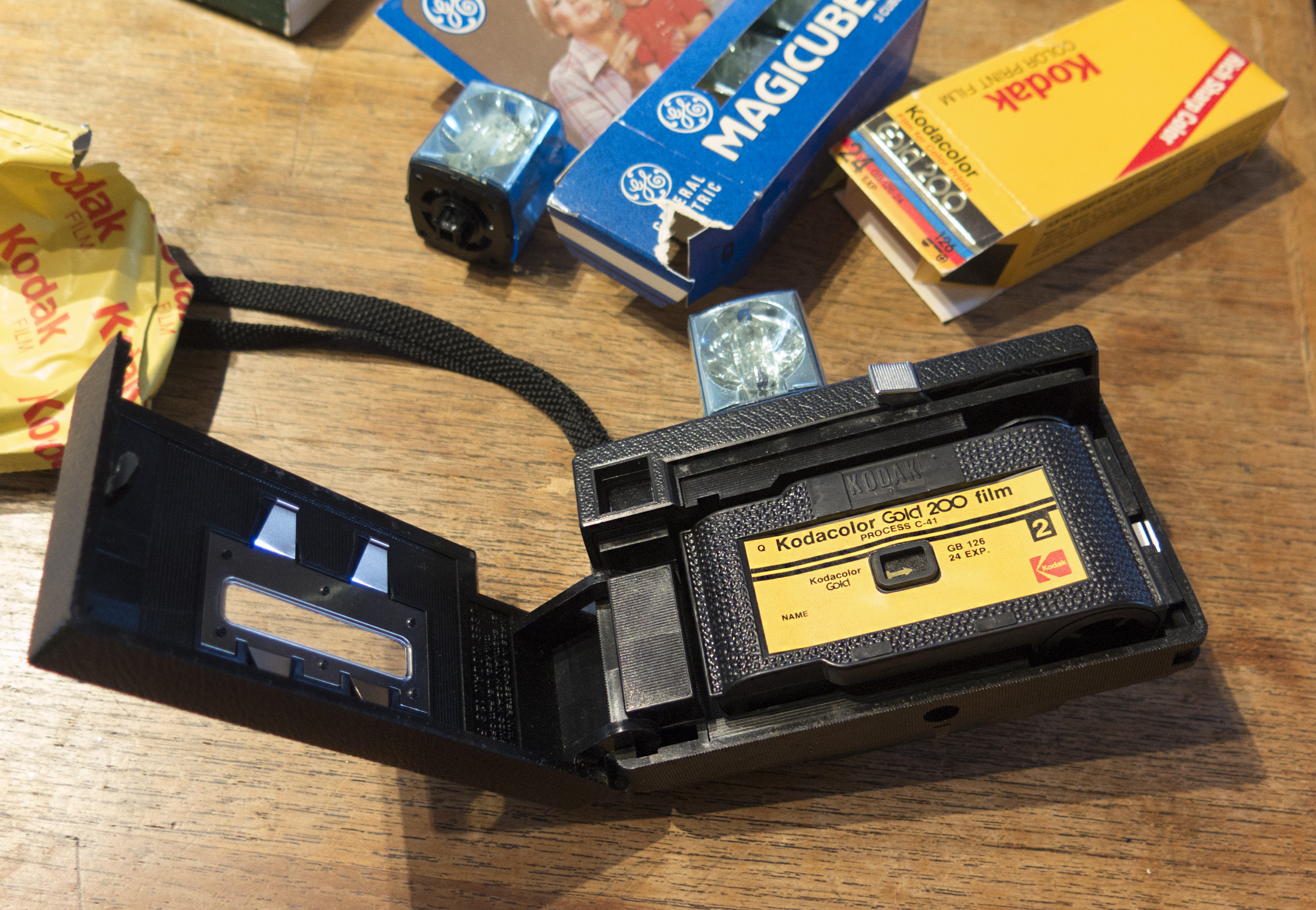
Kodak Instamatic X-15 with open door and loaded 126 film cartridge

The film was originally available in 12 and 20 image lengths; at the time regular production stopped it was only available in 24 exposure cartridges. The exposed film is stored on the take-up spool and does not need to be rewound, making the cameras very simple to load and unload. Kodak published instructions for assembling a simple pinhole camera using a 126 cartridge with typical household materials.

== History ==
The format was introduced in 1963 by Kodak under the brand name Kodapak, together with the Instamatic camera line. Although the Instamatic name is sometimes treated as synonymous with the 126 format, Kodak also used it on similar film cartridge-based camera lines, including its later Pocket Instamatic cameras using 110-format cartridges (1972), and on its Instamatic M series movie cameras using Super 8 film (1965).

Around ten million cameras were made by Kodak and other companies. With a few exceptions, the format was mainly used for fairly simple amateur cameras; some of the few high-end models were manufactured by companies included Kodak, Minolta, Rollei, Yashica and Zeiss Ikon. The 126 cartridge also was used as the basis for a pinhole camera that could be built using household supplies. Kodak officially discontinued the format on 31 December 1999. Unused, outdated 126 films continue to show up at thrift stores, estate sales, and online auctions. Unless they have been stored frozen, they are probably deteriorated and are suitable only for experimenting.

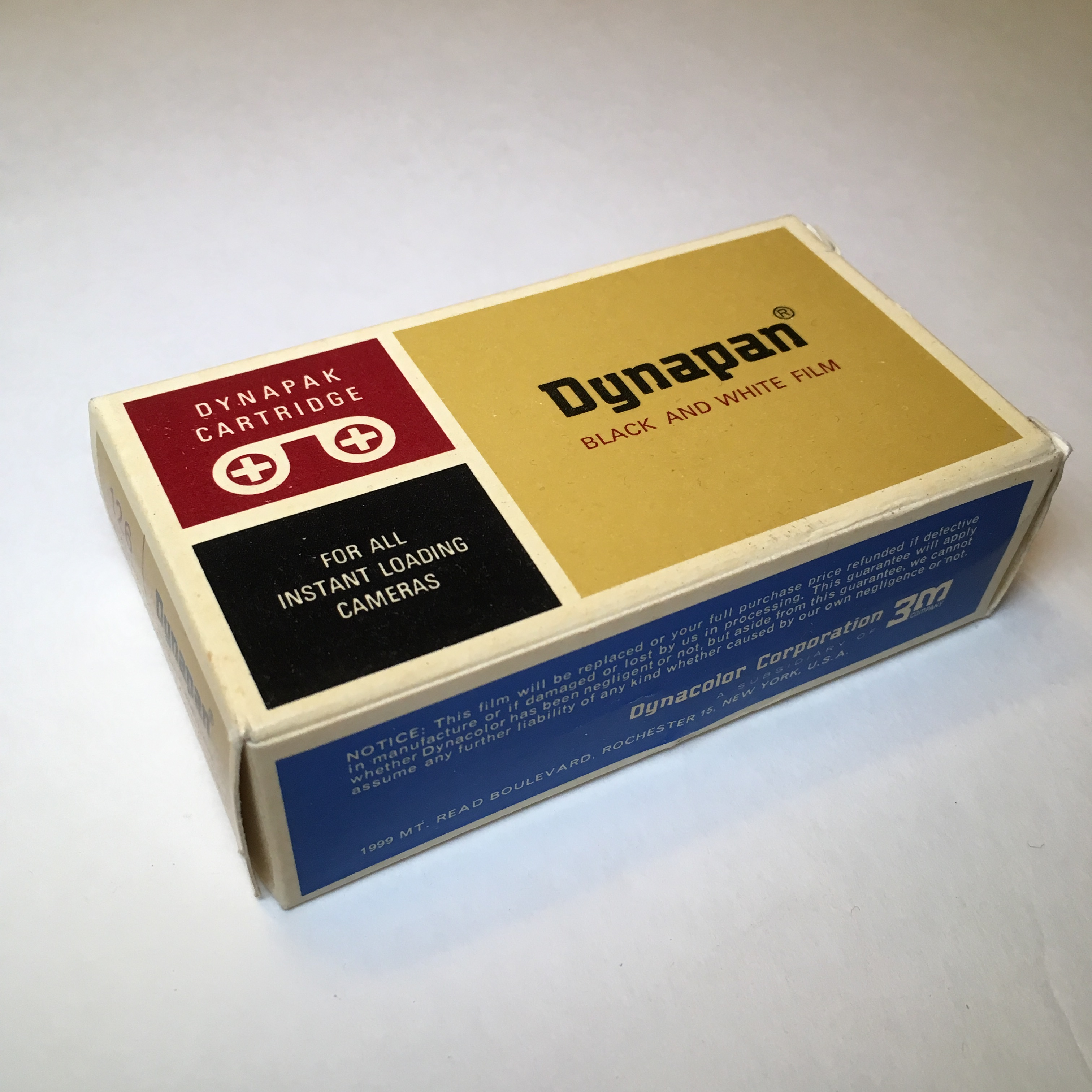
3M Dynapan monochromatic 126 film cartridge in box (expired: February 1969)

=== Current availability and usage ===
Ferrania in Italy was the last factory producing 126 film. They marketed an ISO 200 color print film under their Solaris brand. The last scheduled production run took place in April 2007, but an unscheduled production run in late 2007 surprised industry observers and raised hopes that it had not actually been discontinued. Ferrania's subsequent bankruptcy meant that there was no longer any large-scale factory source for 126 film.

Some photographers reuse the plastic cartridge from outdated 126 films and reload them with fresh 35mm film. The process is not difficult, but it is not entirely practical since the process must be carried out in the dark, as the 35mm film must be removed from the cartridge. In addition, the two films have significantly different perforation schemes. 126 cameras have a film-advance mechanism that relies on one edge perforation per image, and 35mm camera film has eight perforations per image, on both edges of the film. The photographer must use the film-advance mechanism several times between images, and one edge of each image will have visible perforations. An adapter is available for photographers without access to 126 cartridges, but the adapter does not fit all cameras.

Because it is 35 mm wide and is developed in industry-standard C-41 process chemistry, processing of most 126 films is readily available, as long as the photofinisher knows that it is standard, 35 mm-wide, C-41 film. Printing the photos can present problems, because modern film processing equipment often cannot handle the square format of 126 film. Some specialist photographic printers can correctly handle it. Standard flatbed scanners that have a light source for scanning film can be used to scan 126 negatives, perhaps using a mask made with black paper. Note that older film may require uncommon film processing such as C-22.

== See also ==
- Category: Film formats
- Film format
- List of color film systems
- List of film formats
