= Color print film =

Photographic film that produces color negatives

Color print film is used to produce color photographic prints, which date to the early 20th century. Initially a two-color process, it became three-color, more accurate, and more durable with the 1935 introduction of Eastman Kodak’s Company’s Kodachrome film, followed a year later Agfa Company’s Agfacolor. Color print film is the most common type of photographic film in consumer use. Print film produces a negative image when it is developed, requiring it to be reversed again when it is printed onto photographic paper.

Almost all color print film made today is designed to be processed according to the C-41 process.

== Technologies: structure and chemistry ==
Several types of color print film have been manufactured for different film-developing processes. They often contain separate layers, each sensitive to a different color of light.

Common types of film include:

=== Higher ISO film ===
Higher ISO film have more visible grain, it requires a lower exposure because it is more sensitive to light.

=== Lower ISO film ===
Lower ISO film have less visible grain, and it requires a higher exposure as it is less sensitive to light.

=== C-41 film ===
C-41 is a chromogenic color print film developing process introduced by Kodak in 1972, superseding the C-22 process. C-41, also known as CN-16 by Fuji, CNK-4 by Konica, and AP-70 by AGFA, is the most popular film process in use, with most, if not all photofinishing labs devoting at least one machine to this development process.

== Handling of negatives ==
Color negatives are prone to damage through fingerprints and tears. It is accepted professional practice to avoid bending, folding or rolling up negatives or their sleeves, and to wear nylon or cotton gloves when handling negatives.

== Preserving color prints ==
Generally, color prints are more sensitive to temperature and light as opposed to black and white film, therefore there are more precautions to take when trying to protect and optimize the lifespan of them.

It is important to keep the prints protected from physical damage from as little as a fingerprint to as much as scratches that can destroy them completely. Storage for prints that are developed from color print film should be free of any unsafe, harmful chemicals, specifically referring to peroxides, sulfur dioxide, ozone and nitrogen oxides. For the best prolonged storage and protection, placing the prints in polyester uncoated sleeves and then into an envelope seals it from further damage. When it comes to storing them, the optimal temperature would be at 2 °C, as it is found to be the most effective preservation temperature when it comes to a mass collection of colored photographic film prints. It is best to keep the color prints away from strong sunlight exposure for prolonged periods of time because it may result in the decay of the gelatin layer as well as a significant fade in the dye found in the print. Similar to that of watercolors and textiles, dyes in color prints are prone to fade as well when exposed to too much light. Color photographs are susceptible to build stains if stored in dark fully for prolonged periods of time as well, for example, an area of white in a photograph can change into yellow. Therefore, it is key to not store them in an area where they are exposed to long periods of light and/or long periods of dark, there should be a balance. Prime examples of places to store the color prints are: durable binders, cabinets, trays or rigid boxes.

== Cleaning color prints ==
If there is a chance that the prints got dirty, there are several effective methods that can be undertaken to clean them carefully without damaging them. First off is using a soft brush that can remove surface dirt on the print. Make sure to lightly brush the dirt off of the print. Damping cotton swabs or using a specialized cleaning pad to dry wipe the surface of the print is also another method to clean it. Remember to never wash photographs until the gelatin layer is dry and stables. Furthermore, never attempt chemical treatments on color photographs because they can get distorted and destroy the image as a whole.

== See also ==
- List of photographic processes
- Technicolor – Color motion picture process
