= Disc film =

Photography film format common in the 1980s

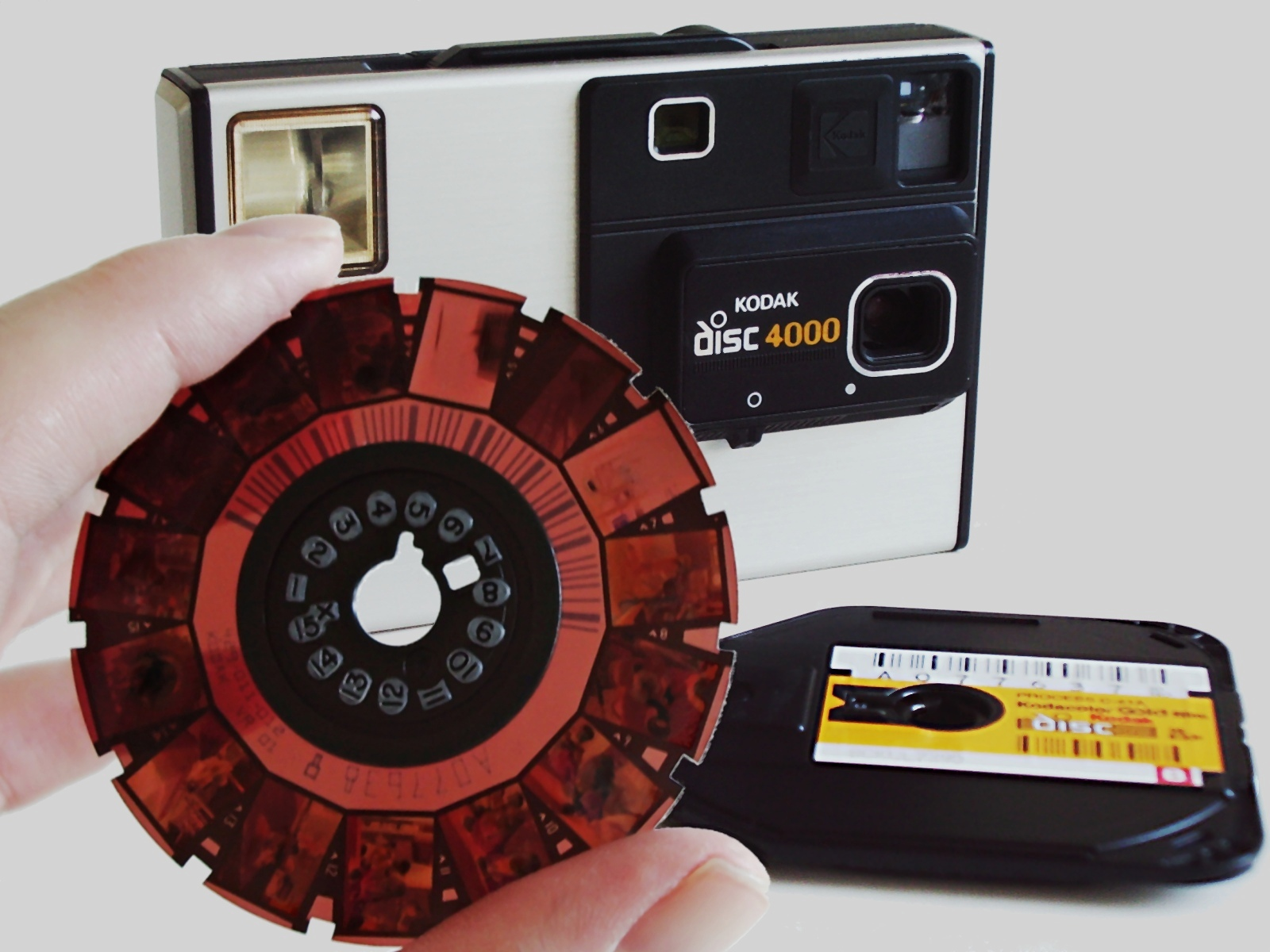
Kodak disc film negative (with camera and film cartridge in background)

Disc film is a discontinued still-photography film format that was aimed at the consumer market. It was introduced by Kodak in 1982.

== Technical details ==
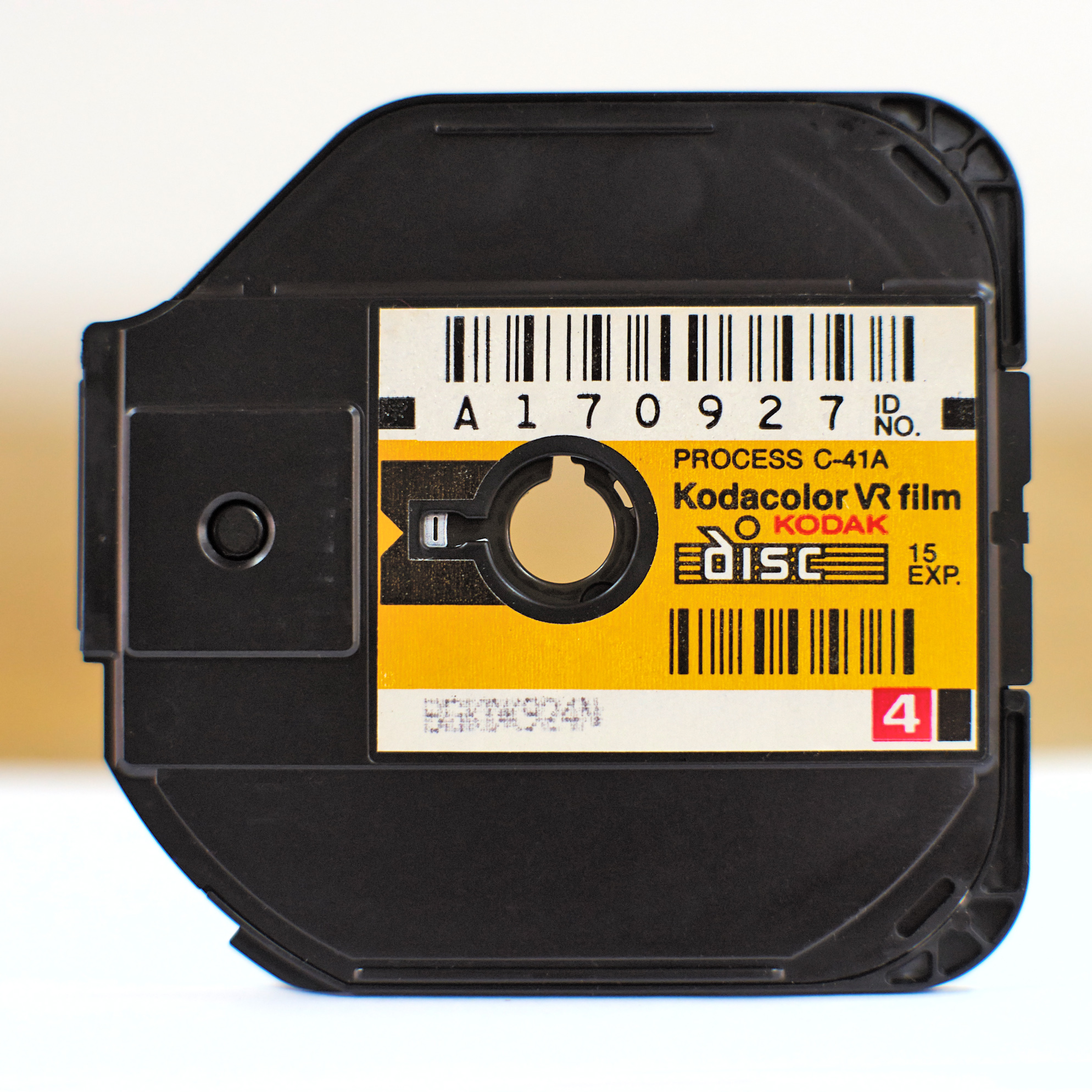
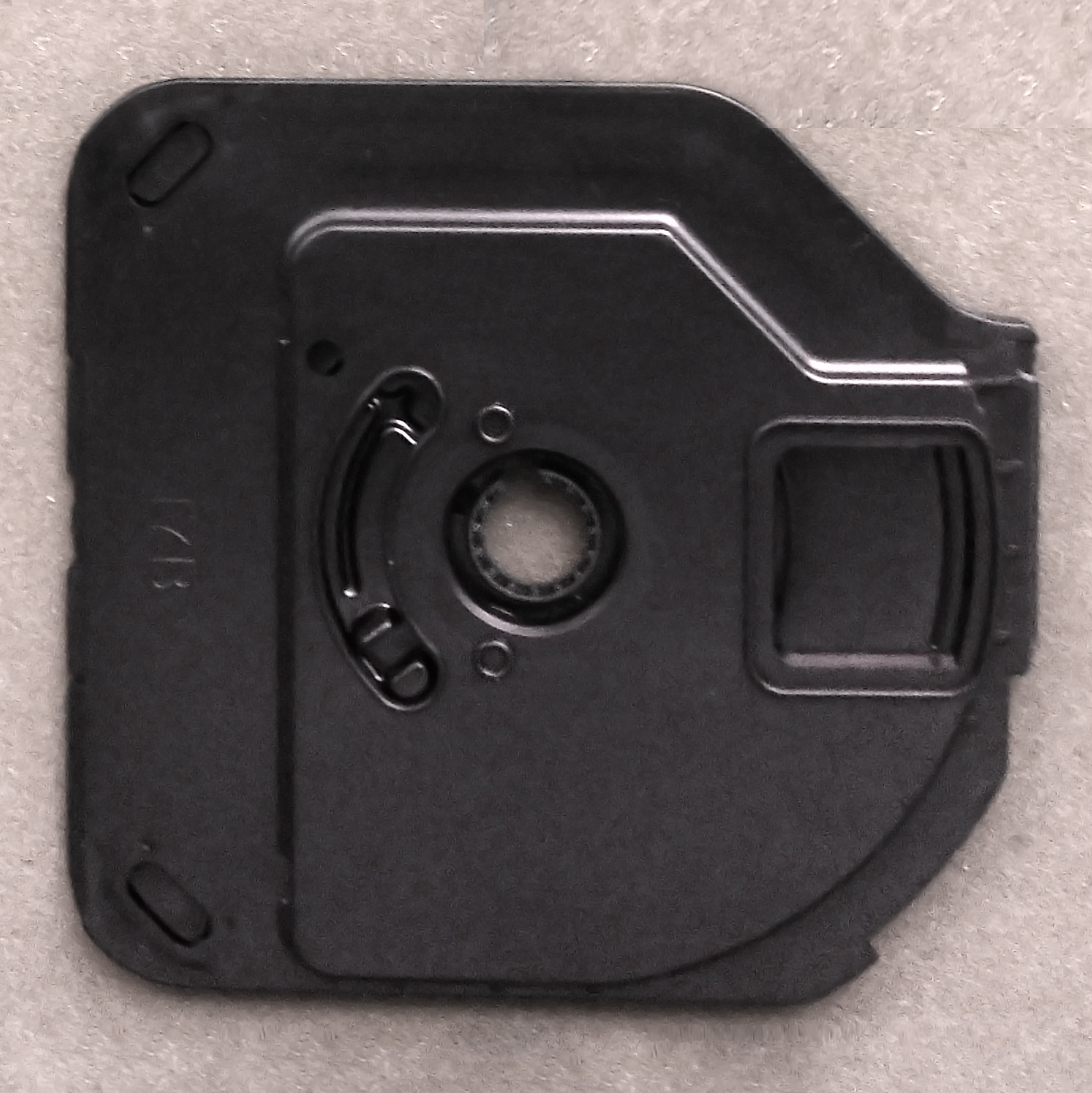
The top and underside of the Disc film cartridge

The film is in the form of a flat disc, and is fully housed within a plastic cartridge. Each disc holds fifteen 10 × 8 mm exposures, arranged around the outside of the disc, with the disc being rotated 24° between successive images.

The system was a consumer-oriented product, and most cameras are self-contained units with no expansion capability. The disc film allows them to be compact and considerably thinner than other cameras of the time. The cameras are very simple to load and unload, and are generally completely automated. The cassette has a built-in dark slide to prevent stray light reaching the film when the disc is removed.

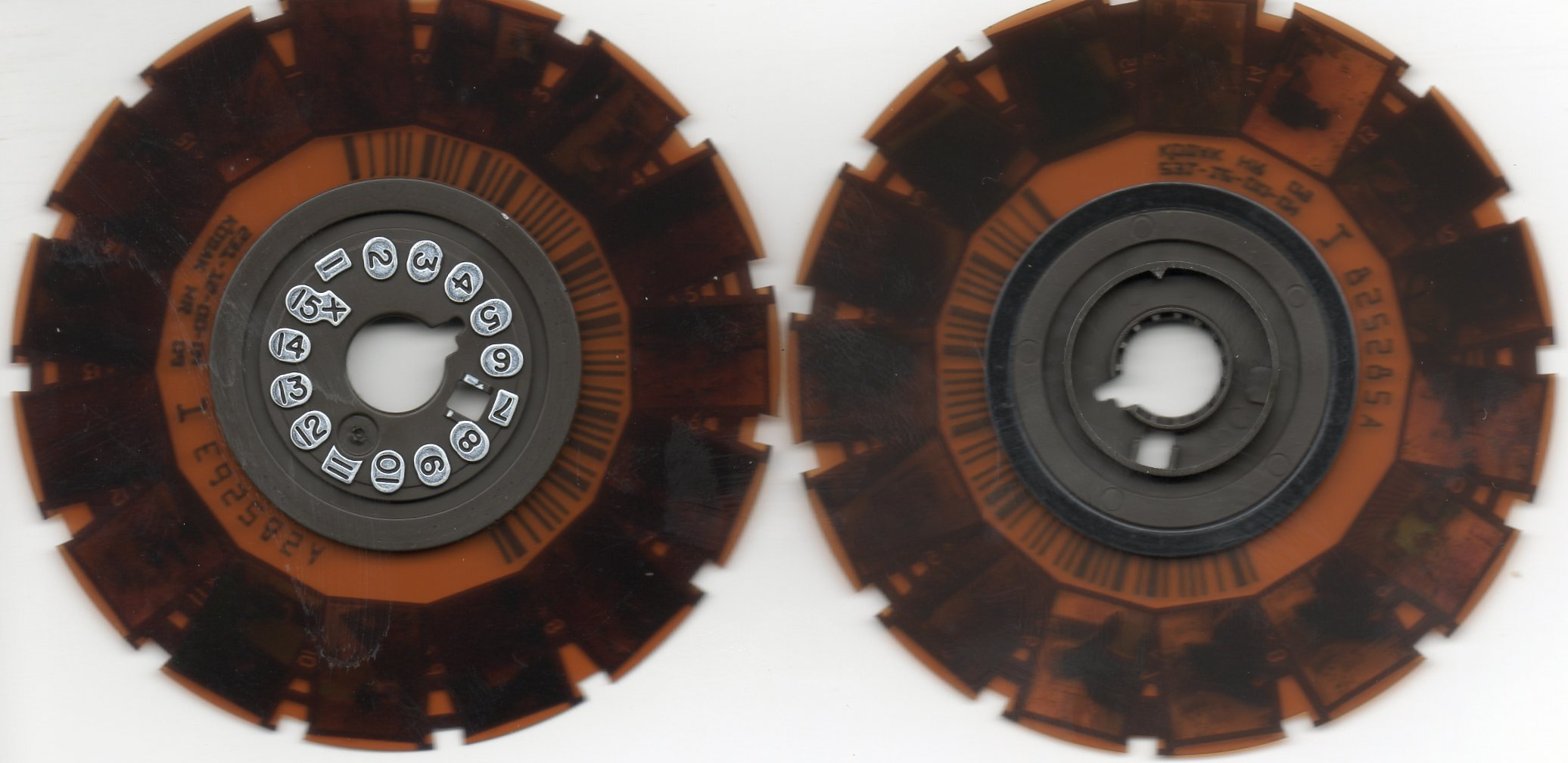
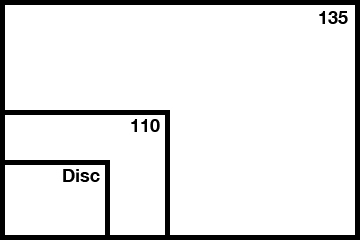
Disc film negatives (both sides, left) and comparison of Disc, 110, and 135 negative frame size (right)

As the film is rotated on a disc instead of over a spool, the cassette is very thin. The flat nature of the format also led to the potential advantage of greater sharpness over curved spool-based cassette formats (such as Minox film, 110 and 126 film). Disc film has a very thick acetate base, comparable thickness with 4×5" sheet film, which holds the film much flatter than the other formats of the time.

A special '23' demonstration disc was made by Kodak so that dealers could show the camera's features without wasting an actual film.

== Performance and market reception ==
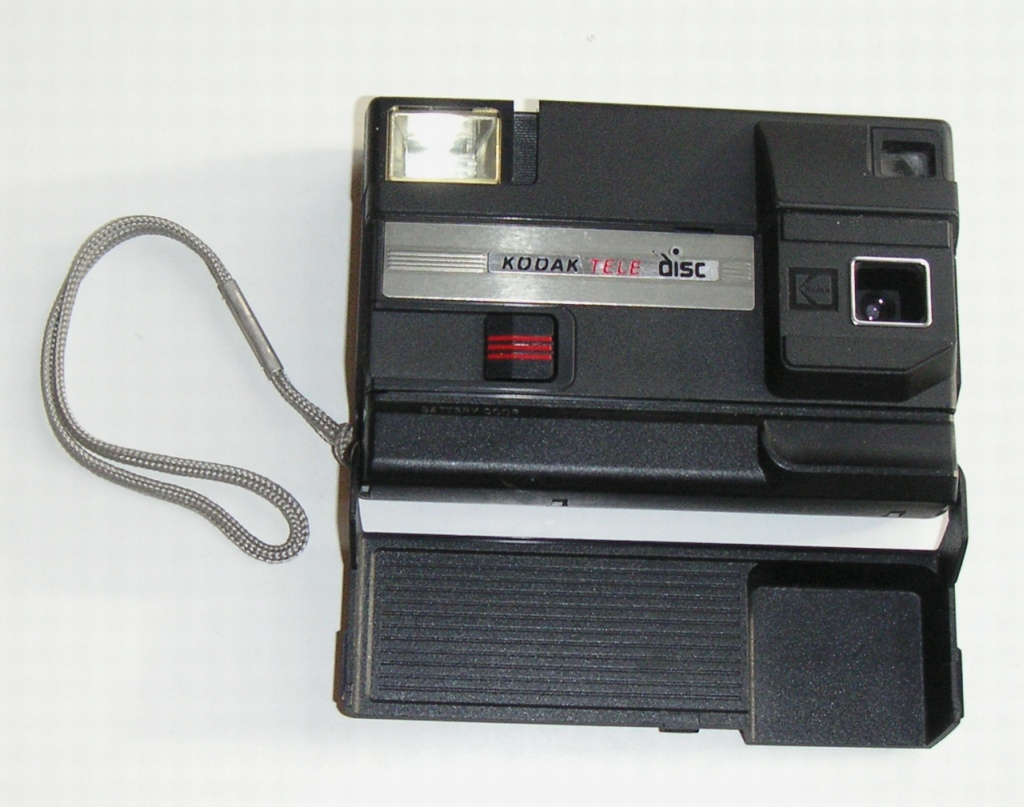
A typical disc camera, manufactured by Kodak

Disc film did not prove successful, mainly because the image on the negative is 10 mm by 8 mm, leading to generally unacceptable grain and poor definition in the final prints from the analog imaging equipment used at the time. The film was intended to be printed with special six-element lenses from Kodak, but many labs simply printed discs with standard three-element lenses used for larger negative formats.

Kodak also produced a device that could be screwed into a standard enlarger lens mount which contained a negative carrier and a special disc enlarging lens. This is still used by photo finishers in the US.

The resulting prints often disappointed the consumer. Few labs made the investment required to get the best out of the small negative size.

Kodak licensed the disc camera format to many brands such as Halina and Minolta. These brands innovated new features of the camera, such as user-replaceable batteries (AAA/AA): indeed, these are the models used by current users with expired film,

Halina cameras were rebranded by many popular retailers of the time (UK: Boots/Dixons). Mercedes-Benz and other car manufacturers supplied disc camera kits in vehicles as an 'accident recorder'.

There were several different manufacturers of disc film. Kodak produced films until 1999, but 3M, Konica and Fuji also produced disc film. While Kodak film was always eponymous, 3M and Konica made disc film for many third parties, branded with the retailer's logo. As with most photographic film, for such white-label products the country of manufacture provides the best indication as to the actual manufacturer.

The film was officially discontinued by the final manufacturer, Kodak, on December 31, 1999, with Kodak ceasing disc camera production in 1988.

== Legacy ==
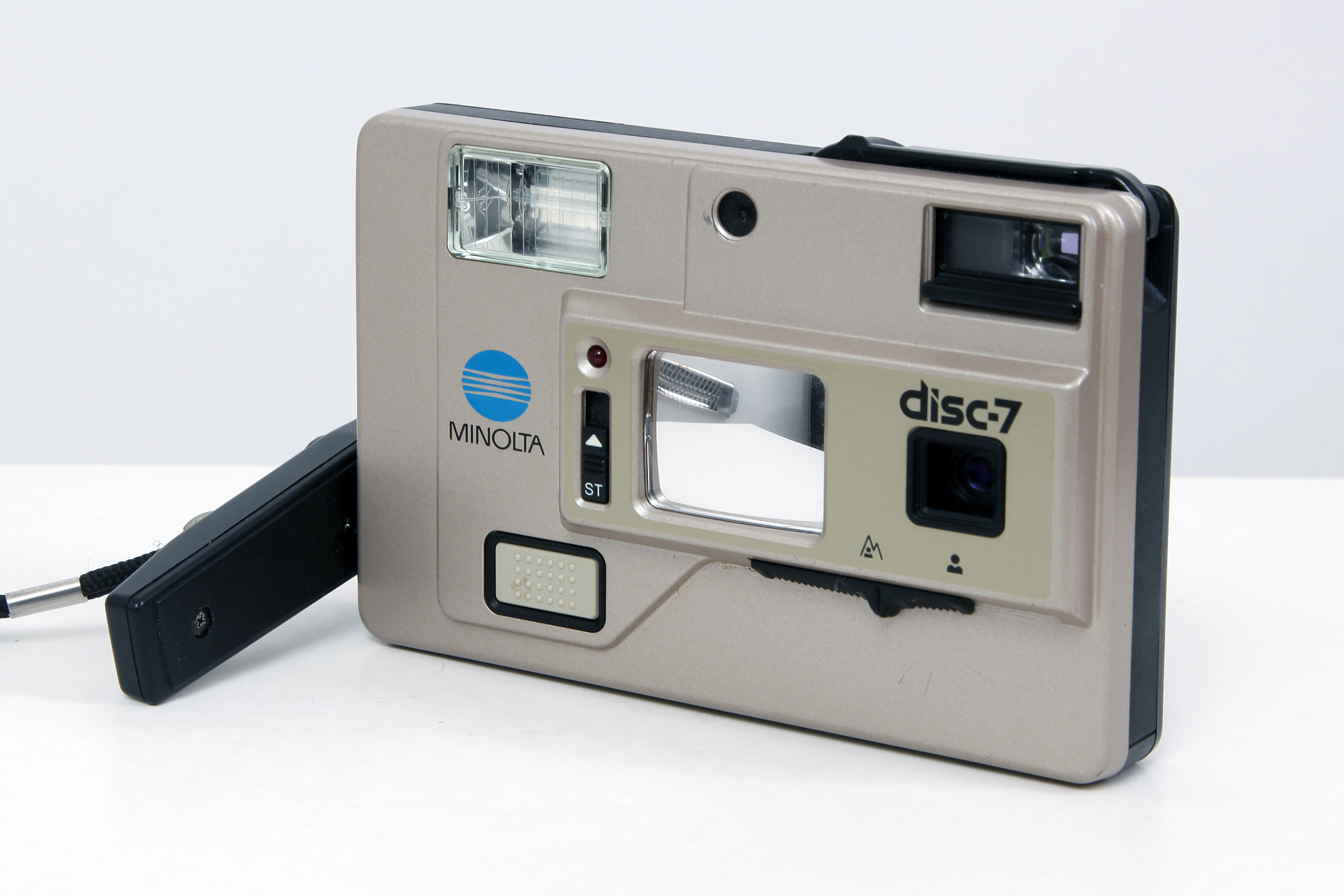
MINOLTA disc-7 with selfie mirror

The 1983 "Minolta Disc-7" camera introduced a predecessor of the selfie stick—a convex mirror on its front to allow the composition of self-portraits, and its packaging showed the camera mounted on a stick while used for such a purpose.

== Film history ==
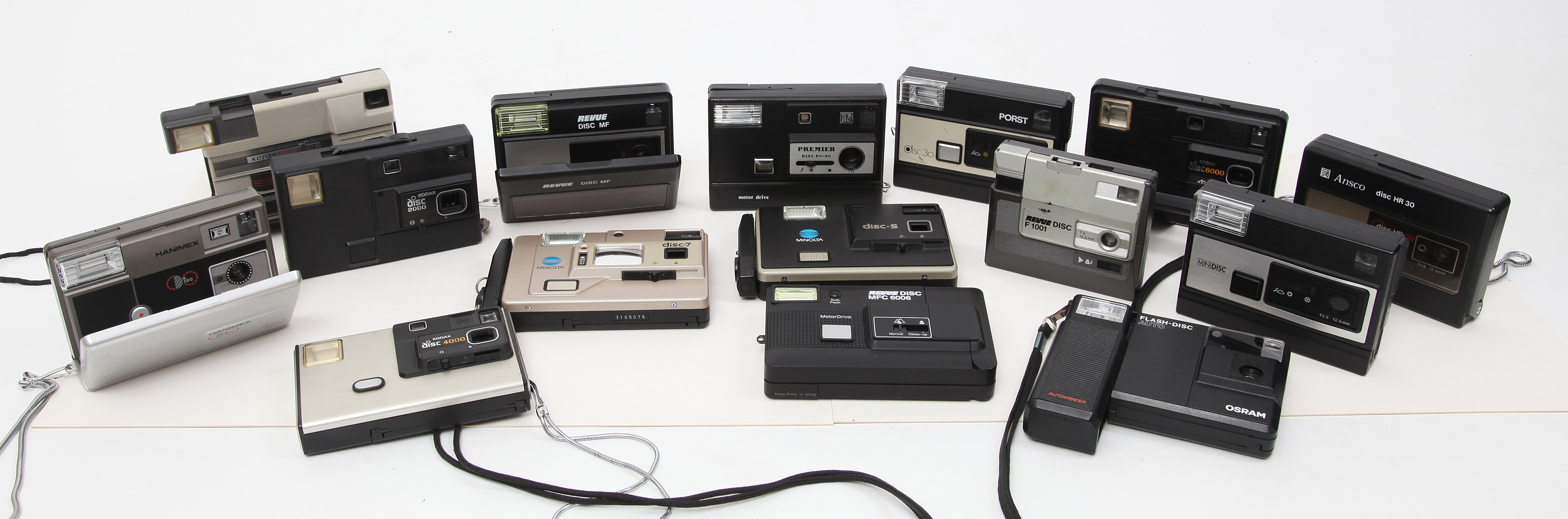
Various models of disc camera

- Kodak: Kodacolor HR (1981), Kodacolor VR (1982–1991), Kodacolor (or Kodak) Gold (1992–1999)
- Fuji: Fujicolor HR series (1982–1995) and third party film. Manufactured in Japan.
- 3M: HR film series (1982–1996) and third party film. Manufactured in Italy until the 1990s, then USA.
- Konica: Konicacolor SR (c. 1983–86), SR-V (c. 1980s), SR-G (c. 1990–93). Also third party film. Manufactured in Japan.
