= Replenishment (photography) =

Replenishment is a component in the processing of photographic film and paper, where fresh chemistry is used to replace exhausted chemistry in a continuous or per-batch fashion. Replenishment rates are calculated by the quantity of film processed in each individual bath; as well as by the amount of film push-processed in the E-6 process; and by film type in the C-41 process.

== C-41 and C41-RA process replenishing ==
C-41 color developer exhaustion volumes vary according to the speed and contrast of the films. Kodak documents replenishment rates for various Kodak color negative films (specifically, see Table 3-2 in Section 3).
