= Polaroid type 55 =

Black-and-white peel-apart Polaroid film

Type 55
- Maker: Polaroid
- Speed: 50/18° (pos); 35/16° (neg)
- Type: B&W instant
- Format: 4×5"
- Application: General

Polaroid Type 55 film is a black-and-white peel-apart Polaroid film that yields both a positive print and a negative image that can be used to create enlargements.

The film speed is given by the manufacturers as 50 ISO, however that applies only to the positive component. The negative is rated by Polaroid as 25 ISO though it is possible to rate the negative at 32 ISO).

After processing the film is peeled apart to reveal positive and negative images. To prevent fading and physical damage the positive image requires a protective coating (included in the box) while the negative requires a clearing solution: Polaroid recommends an 18% Sodium-Sulfite solution but some users favour Kodak's Hypo-Clear. Polaroid also recommends a hardening fixative to protect the negative from scratches as Type 55 negatives are thin compared to other 4x5" negatives, and the emulsion is extremely delicate.

These negatives are fine-grained, have a broad tonal range and are of extremely high resolution, on the order of 150 LP/mm, can create large prints and are suitable for contact printing, particularly involving Cyanotype and Van Dyke brown to create 'blueprint' and 'sepia' prints respectively.

Polaroid Type 55 (like all Type 50 series film) requires a Polaroid Model 545 Film Packet Back. This is mounted onto the back of a camera, usually a large format 4x5 inch type, in place of a conventional film carrier. A self-contained waterproof transparent sleeve containing positive and negative film sheets and a small reservoir of reagent gel is inserted into the Packet Back, an exposure made and the Packet Back is removed. By flipping a lever and withdrawing the sleeve the gel is squeezed between the negative and positive emulsion layers. After the set time the layers can be peeled apart. some gel is retained at the edges, creating positive and negative images.

A consequence of the process is an impression of a frame on the unprotected negative. The result (a perfect negative surrounded by imperfect frame-like image on three sides, the fourth showing an impression of connective mesh) creates a distinctive "Polaroid frame look" that became popular, so much so photographers who did not use large format cameras (or any kind of chemical process) graphically combine a conventional photographic image, however created, with a superimposed image of an original 'Polaroid frame' as a graphic effect.

In 2001 Polaroid filed for bankruptcy protection, and in February 2008 announced it would cease production of all instant film, filing for bankruptcy protection a second time.

In 2009 the business was sold, the new owners announcing instant film production would be licensed out to a smaller company. The chemicals needed to process Polaroid instant film had been stockpiled in case of this eventuality but the licensees announced their intention to redesign and manufacture film on a limited basis under the Polaroid brand that would be compatible with most Polaroid film cameras, using machinery left over from a liquidated factory in the Netherlands. In response, in November 2009, Polaroid announced its intention to relaunch the manufacture of Polaroid film cameras in 2010 on a limited basis, marketed to enthusiasts and contingent on the availability of the newly licensed film stock. Initial plans are to produce a black-and-white film to replace existing film stocks, followed by a color film.

Stocks of existing Polaroid Type 55 film are scheduled to expire in 2010.

== New55 FILM ==
Between 2010 and 2017, a company called New55 Holdings, LLC (under its brand, "New55 FILM") researched and brought to market a black and white 4x5 positive-negative material that is exposed and processed in a Polaroid 545 holder. New55 PN provided a positive print and negative that could be scanned, contact printed, or enlarged. In May 2014, New55 FILM was successfully crowd-funded at Kickstarter for the purpose of bringing it to market.

Between 2014 and 2017, New55 FILM sold New55 PN and other related products direct to photographers all over the world, generating over $1 million in sales. Upon the failure of a key component supplier (the pod) and while demand remained strong, the company ended operations on December 31, 2017, closing out the proof-of-principle R&D phase of the project.

Among the innovative features of New55 PN was the more environmentally friendly aqueous material application method used to coat the print. The New55 PN system also improved over Polaroid's Type 55 by having a lower parts-count (thus less thrown away) and, in the photographic results, the New55 PN positive and negative densities were identical (where the Polaroid Type 55's were a stop or two apart, forcing the sacrifice of either the positive or the negative in order to gain ideal exposure on only one of the two components).

New55 FILM also brought back a product like Kodak's old Ready-Load and FujiFilm's QuickLoad products that were discontinued, called 1SHOT Ready Loaded Sheet Film. 1SHOT established a way for 4x5 photographers to shoot Ilford's HP5+, Kodak's TRI-X, TMAX, Portra 160 and 400, and Fujifilm's Velvia 100 as well as New55 FILM's Atomic-X 100 4x5 sheet films—all in the New55 FILM's special packet system for the legacy Polaroid 545 (545i and 545 Pro) Land Film Holder. Additionally, New55 FILM manufactured and sold its monobath developer called R5 MONOBATH DEVELOPER, a single solution for developing black and white photographic film negatives in 6 minutes in a daylight tank.
