= C-41 process =

Color film developing process

C-41 is a chromogenic color print film developing process introduced by Kodak in 1972, superseding the C-22 process. C-41, also known as CN-16 by Fuji, CNK-4 by Konica, and AP-70 by AGFA, is the most popular film process in use, with most, if not all photofinishing labs devoting at least one machine to this development process.

Processed C-41 negatives, as with all color films, consist of an image formed of dye. Due to the long-term instability of dyes, C-41 negatives can fade or color-shift over time. This was a significant problem with early films; whether newer films are archival or not is a subject of some debate.

== Film structure ==
Fujicolor Superia is an example of a C-41 process film. This diagram illustrates the layers Fujifilm has chosen for this film. Note the antihalation layer.

C-41 film consists of an acetate or polyester film base, onto which multiple emulsions are coated. Each layer is only sensitive to a certain color of visible light.

In an idealized, illustrative example, there are three light-sensitive layers: one is red-sensitive, another is green-sensitive, and the top is blue-sensitive. Beneath the blue layer is a yellow filter, composed of dyes or colloidal silver, also known as Carey Lea Silver. All silver-based photographic emulsions have some sensitivity to blue light, regardless of what other colors they may be sensitized for. This filter layer serves to remove the blue light, which would expose the layers beneath it. Beneath the blue-sensitive layer and the yellow filter are the green- and red-sensitive layers. The yellow filter is removed in development.

Each emulsion layer, in addition to the light-sensitive components, contains dye coupler chemicals. These couplers, located in the blue-, green-, and red-sensitive layers, produce yellow, magenta, and cyan dyes, respectively, when developed. In most C-41 films, the unexposed areas of the green-sensitive layer remain a yellow color, and the unexposed areas of the red-sensitive layer remain a reddish color. These residual couplers act as a mask to compensate for the magenta dye absorbing some blue light and the cyan dye absorbing some green light. This is what gives the film its orange tint.

The illustrative example outlined above differs from the design of actual film, in respect to the number of layers. Almost all C-41 films contain multiple layers for each color-sensitive layer. Individual layers have different speed and contrast characteristics, allowing the film to be correctly exposed over a wider range of lighting conditions.

In addition to multiple emulsion layers, real films have other layers that are not sensitive to light. In some cases, the base is first coated with an antihalation layer to minimize reflections. Some films are top-coated with UV-blocking layers or anti-scratch coatings. There also may be layers to separate different emulsions, or additional filter layers.

=== The negative ===
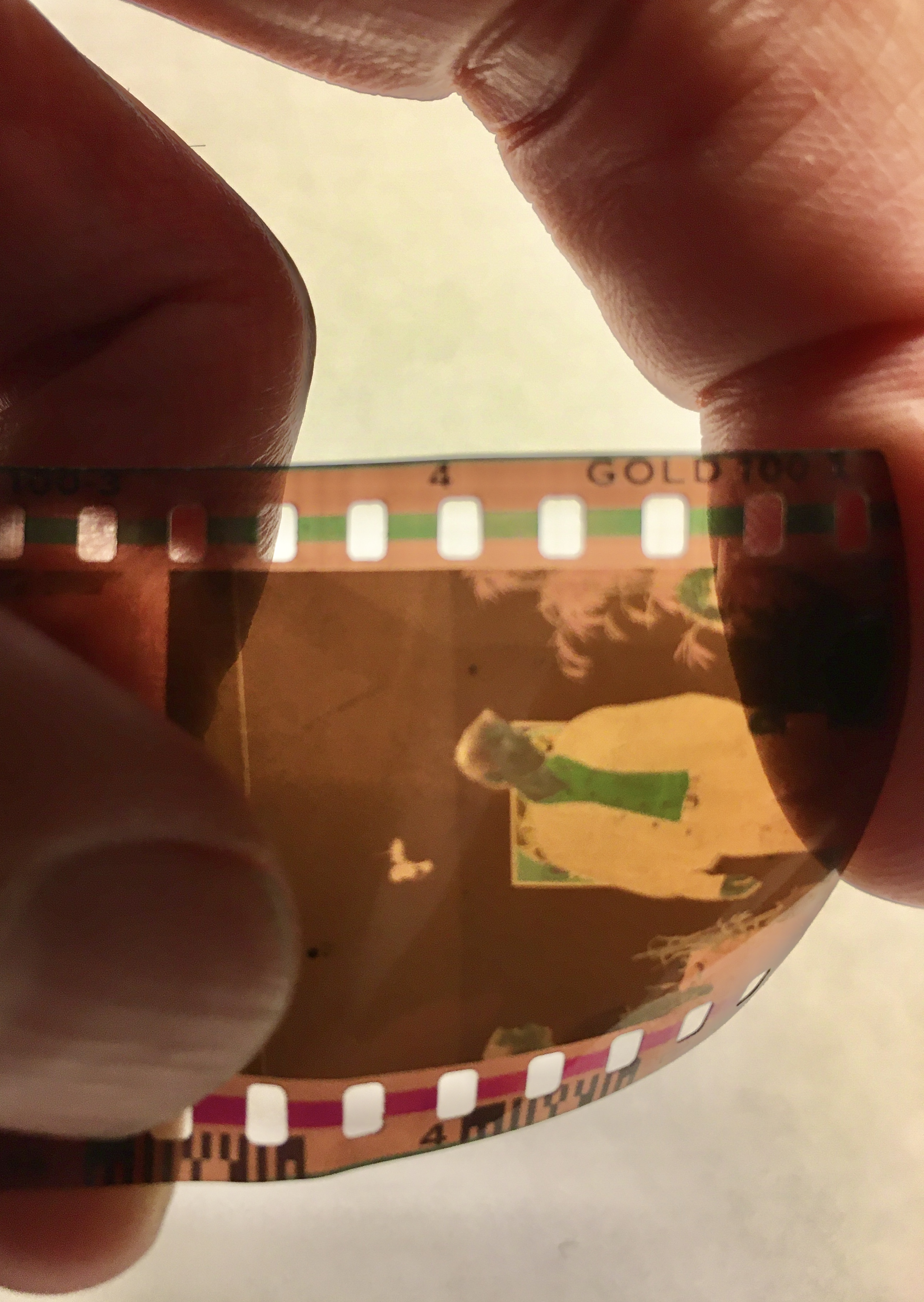
Kodacolor Gold 100 film, exposed and developed negative, showing characteristic orange base color and inverted colors

After processing, the resulting film is a negative, meaning that the darkest spots on the film are those areas that were brightest in the source. Light is projected through the finished negative onto color photographic paper, yielding positive image prints. The usual process for the optical printing of C-41 negatives is the RA-4 process.

Nearly all C-41 films also include an orange mask to offset the optical inadequacies of the dyes in the film. These C-41 negatives appear orange when viewed directly, though the orange mask is compensated for in the formulation of color print materials. Some C-41 films, intended for scanning, do not have this orange mask.

== Process ==
Color negative film exposure and processing schematic
Step	Name	Time (mm:ss)	Temp.	Illustration	Description
1	Loading film	—N/a			Unexposed film, with light-sensitive grains in three different layers
2	Exposure	—N/a			Exposing film, showing different components of light penetrating to the respective light-sensitive layers and resulting selective sensitization of grains
3	Developer	3:15	37.8 ± 0.15 °C (100.04 ± 0.27 °F)		Sensitized grains are developed and dye coupler clouds are formed
4	Bleach	6:30	24–41 °C (75–106 °F)		Silver is washed out of film, including yellow filter layer, leaving negative with reversed colors
5	Wash	3:15	37.8 ± 3.0 °C (100.0 ± 5.4 °F)		Silver is washed out of film, including yellow filter layer, leaving negative with reversed colors
6	Fixer	6:30	24–41 °C (75–106 °F)		Silver is washed out of film, including yellow filter layer, leaving negative with reversed colors
7	Second wash	3:15	37.8 ± 3.0 °C (100.0 ± 5.4 °F)		Silver is washed out of film, including yellow filter layer, leaving negative with reversed colors
8	Stabilizer	1:30	24–41 °C (75–106 °F)		Silver is washed out of film, including yellow filter layer, leaving negative with reversed colors
9	Dry	10–20	24–41 °C (75–106 °F)	—N/a	Stabilizer contains a wetting agent to enhance spot-free drying

The C-41 process is the same for all C-41 films, although different manufacturers' processing chemistries vary slightly. C-41 was introduced with Kodacolor II and its professional equivalent, Vericolor II, as the 'Flexicolor' process, replacing C-22, which was used with Kodacolor-X and Ektacolor Professional. Compared to C-22, the working temperature of C-41 is higher, at 100 °F (38 °C), versus 75 °F (24 °C) for C-22; total processing time was cut almost in half with C-41, but it is very sensitive to development bath time.

After exposure, the film is developed in a "color developer". The developing ingredient is a paraphenylene diamine-based chemical branded as CD-4. The developer develops the silver in the emulsion layers. As the silver is developing, oxidized developer reacts with the dye couplers, resulting in formation of dyes.

The control of temperature and agitation of the film in the developer is critical in obtaining consistent, accurate results. Incorrect temperature can result in severe color shifts or significant under- or overdevelopment of the film.

After the developer, a bleach converts the metallic silver generated by development to silver halide, which is soluble in fixer. After the bleach, a fixer removes the silver halide. This is followed by a wash, and a final stabilizer and rinse to complete the process.

The bleach in C-41 does not use ferricyanide, which increases cost; it is possible to develop C-41 using substitute chemicals, which requires an extra step for a stop bath after the developer. There are simplified versions of the process that use a combined bleach-fix (EDTA) that dissolves the silver generated by development and removes undeveloped silver halide. These are not used by commercial C-41 processors, and are marketed for home or field use.

=== Push processing ===
Similar to black-and-white film processing, the C-41 process can be adjusted to push-process films. Kodak recommends an additional duration of 30 seconds in the developer bath to push certain films by one stop.

Due to the complexity of the film and exacting nature of the process, the results vary widely; as with black-and-white negatives, the process generally results in a negative that is higher in contrast and sometimes higher in grain.

=== Cross processing ===
It is also possible to cross-process slide film for the E-6 process in C-41, which yields negatives with a color shift and stronger saturation. Varying brands and film speeds yield different color shifts producing bright, saturated colors and high contrast. C-41 film also may be processed in E-6, yielding positive images with a strong green cast, caused by the orange mask.

C-41 film can be processed in standard black-and-white chemicals, to produce a monochrome negative image. The negatives will typically be of very low contrast, and cloudy, partly caused by the orange mask.

== Black-and-white use ==
=== C-41 "chromogenic" black-and-white films ===
While C-41 is usually considered a color process, Ilford currently manufactures a "chromogenic" C-41 compatible black-and-white film, XP2 Super. Kodak used to manufacture a similar film, BW400CN, but this was discontinued in August 2014. (These should not be confused with regular black-and-white films, which are not compatible with C-41 chemistry.)

These films work like any other C-41 film; development causes dyes to form in the emulsion. Their structure, however, is different. Although they may have multiple layers, all are sensitive to all colors of light, and are designed to produce a black dye. The result is a black-and white image.

The Kodak film has the same orange base as color C-41 films; the base on XP2 is purple and Fuji films are clear. The orange base on the Kodak film allows them to be printed with correct blacks on standard color printing machines, but this film can be difficult to print on multigrade black-and-white paper, whose contrast is determined by the use of a colored filter during the printing process. Conversely, the clear-based Ilford and Fuji films sometimes results in off-color prints on color paper, but can be optically printed on black-and-white paper, just like any other black-and-white film.

It is often said that prints from these films do not have grain. While they may not appear to have grain, this statement is technically incorrect. On an image from regular black-and-white film, the individual silver particles forming the image are seen as grain. The image on the C-41 films, however, does not contain silver. Instead, C-41 negatives and prints have clouds of dye, causing the resulting image to appear different from that of silver grain.

=== Traditional black-and-white films ===
While regular black-and-white films are not intended for use with C-41 chemistry, some photographers have used C-41 developer to develop high-contrast black-and-white films (such as traffic surveillance film and Kodak's Technical Pan). This is done in order to lower the contrast. In this application, only a silver image is formed; the bleach step of the C-41 process is not used, as it would destroy the image.

== See also ==
- Chromogenic
- Replenishment (photography)
