= 110 film =

Cartridge film format introduced in 1972

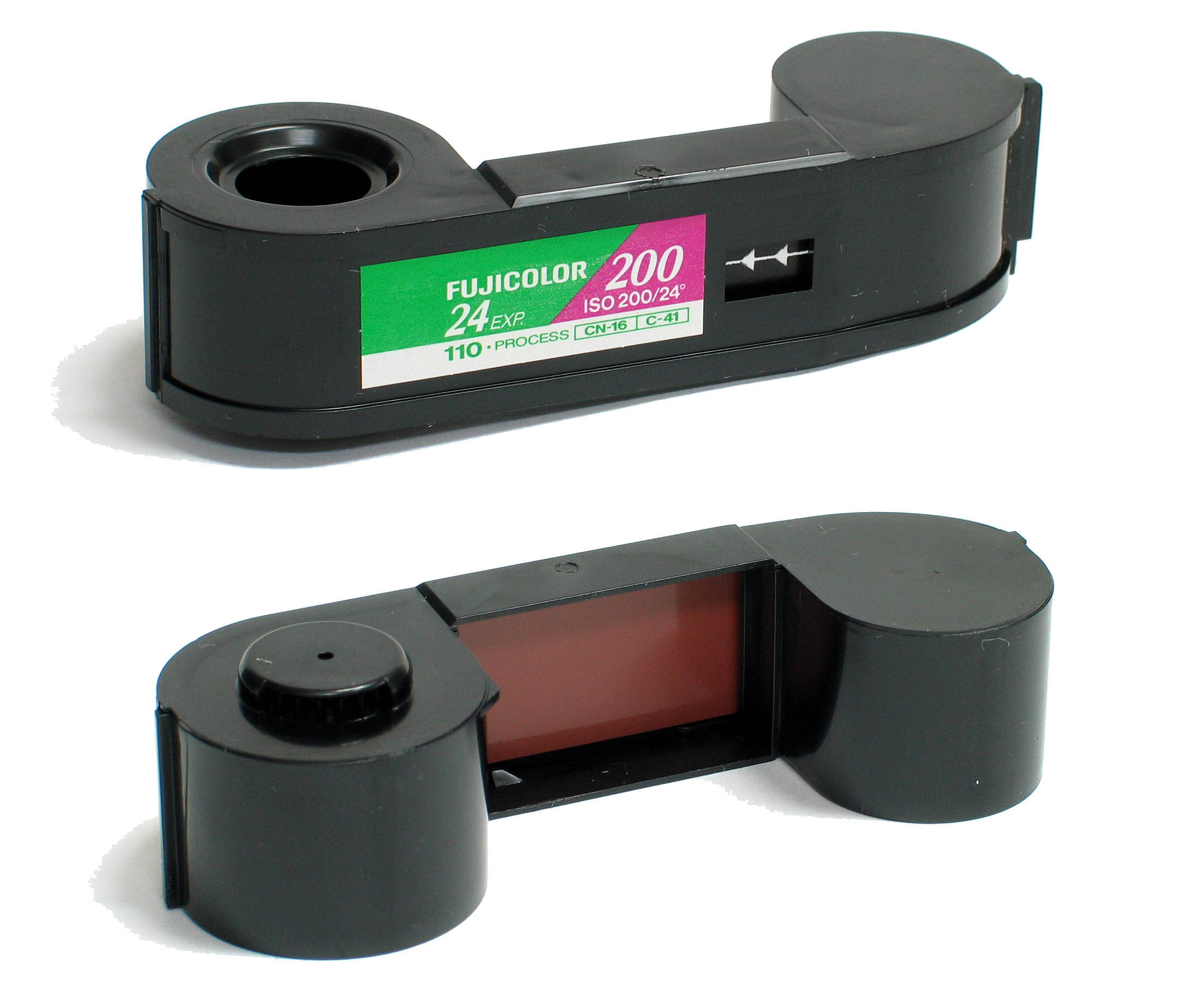
110 film cartridge (shown from front and from rear)

110 is a cartridge-based film format used in still photography. It was introduced by Kodak in 1972. 110 is essentially a miniaturized version of Kodak's earlier 126 film format. Each frame is 13 mm × 17 mm (0.51 in × 0.67 in), with one registration hole. Cartridges with 12, 20, or 24 frames are available. Production variations sometimes have allowed for an additional image.

The film is fully housed in a plastic cartridge, which also registers the image when the film is advanced. There is a continuous backing paper, and the frame number is visible through a window at the rear of the cartridge. The film does not need to be rewound and is very simple to load and unload. The film is usually pre-exposed with frame lines and numbers, a feature intended to make it easier and more efficient for photo finishers to print.

Unlike later competing formats, such as disc and APS film, processed 110 negatives are returned in strips, without the original cartridge.

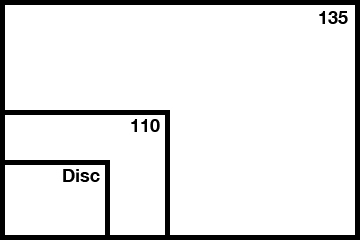
Comparison of Disc, 110, and 135 image size

== History ==
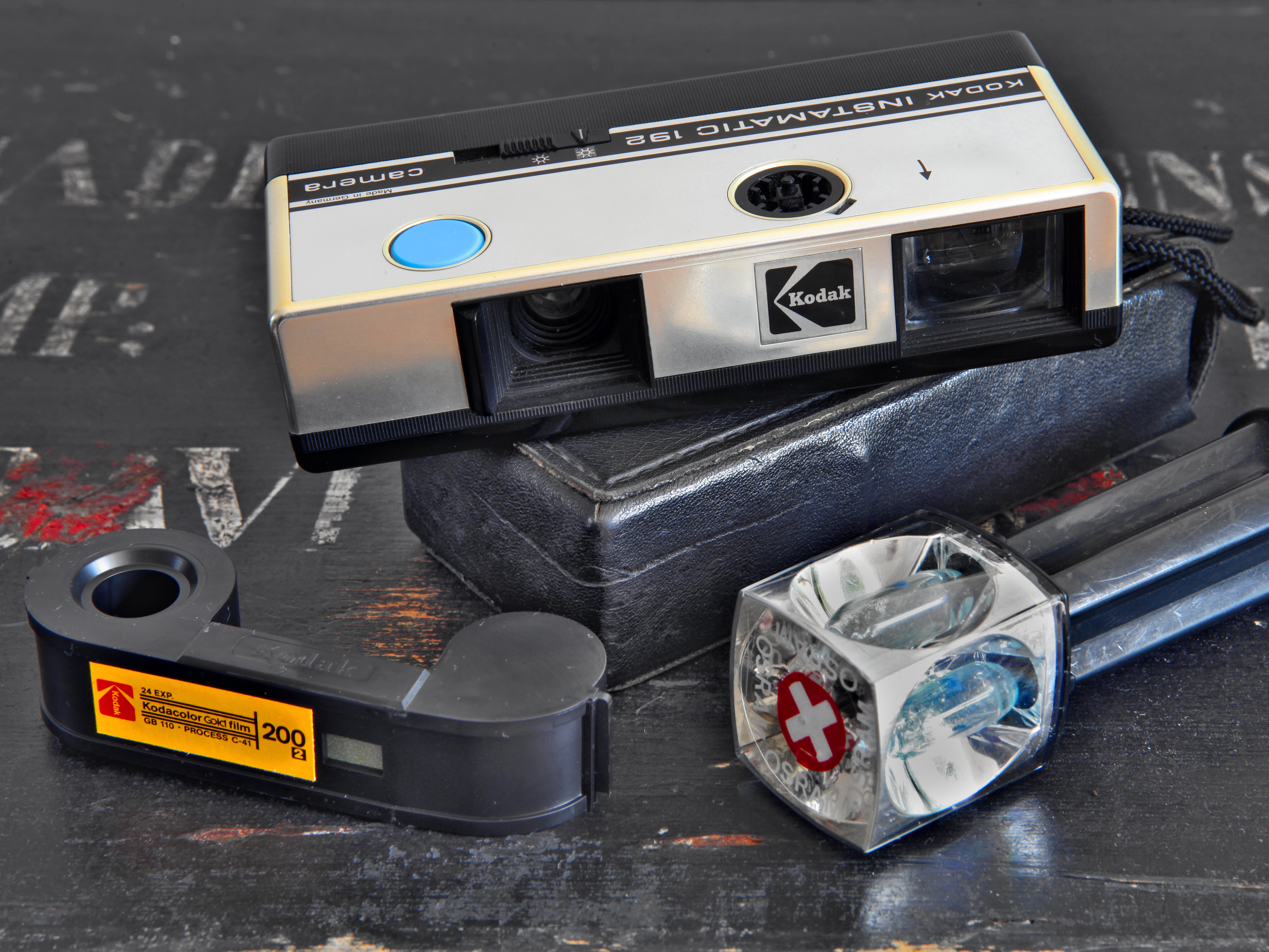
Kodak Instamatic 192, a typical 110-format pocket camera, with 110 film and "Magicube" flash cartridge (with extender)

The 110 cartridge was introduced by Kodak in 1972 with Kodak Pocket Instamatic cameras with Kodachrome-X, Ektachrome-X, Kodacolor II, and Verichrome Pan film. The new pocket-sized cameras became immediately popular, and soon displaced competing subminiature cameras, such as the Minolta 16 series, from the market. The 110 film width is 16 mm. A four-frame strip measures 111 mm.

The 16 mm film width allowed Kodachrome film in 110 size to be processed on the existing processing machines that processed movie films in the Standard 8 mm film and 16 mm film sizes.

Fujifilm stopped manufacturing 110 format film in September 2009. Lomography re-commenced 110 film production in 2011. As of 2024, they offer 110 Black and White, Color Negative, and a variety of experimental stocks such as Lomochrome Purple and Metropolis.

Estes Industries has long marketed several model rockets, the most notable being the Astrocam, with a simple 110 camera in the nose; the shutter is triggered when the nose cone separates from the rocket body.

Tyco (in their Spy Tech line of toys) made two toy spy cameras in the early 1990s that utilized 110 film, called the Hidden Camera and Reese's Camera. The Reese's Camera was meant to resemble two Reese's two packs stuck together (it used a generic, likely pre-existing mold, it was just molded in orange and had Reese's stickers on it), while the Hidden Camera came with a removable cardboard cover sleeve with small cutouts for the trigger button and front lens that made it resemble a Good & Plenty candy box. The Hidden Camera had a periscope-like attachment that used a mirror for taking pictures around corners or behind objects. The Hidden Camera's shape and size is similar to that of the Minox B.

The only new 110 film available on the market is currently produced by Austrian analogue photography company Lomography.

== Design and technical issues ==
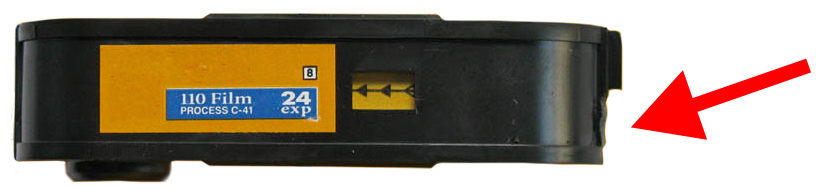
A 110 cartridge of ISO 400 film. The arrow indicates the modification made so that sophisticated cameras detect the proper film speed.

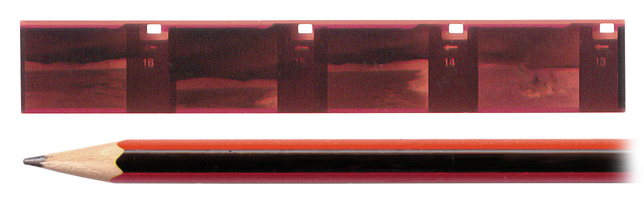
Negative strip of 110 film (with pencil for scale). The strip shown measures 111 mm × 16 mm (4.37 in × 0.63 in).

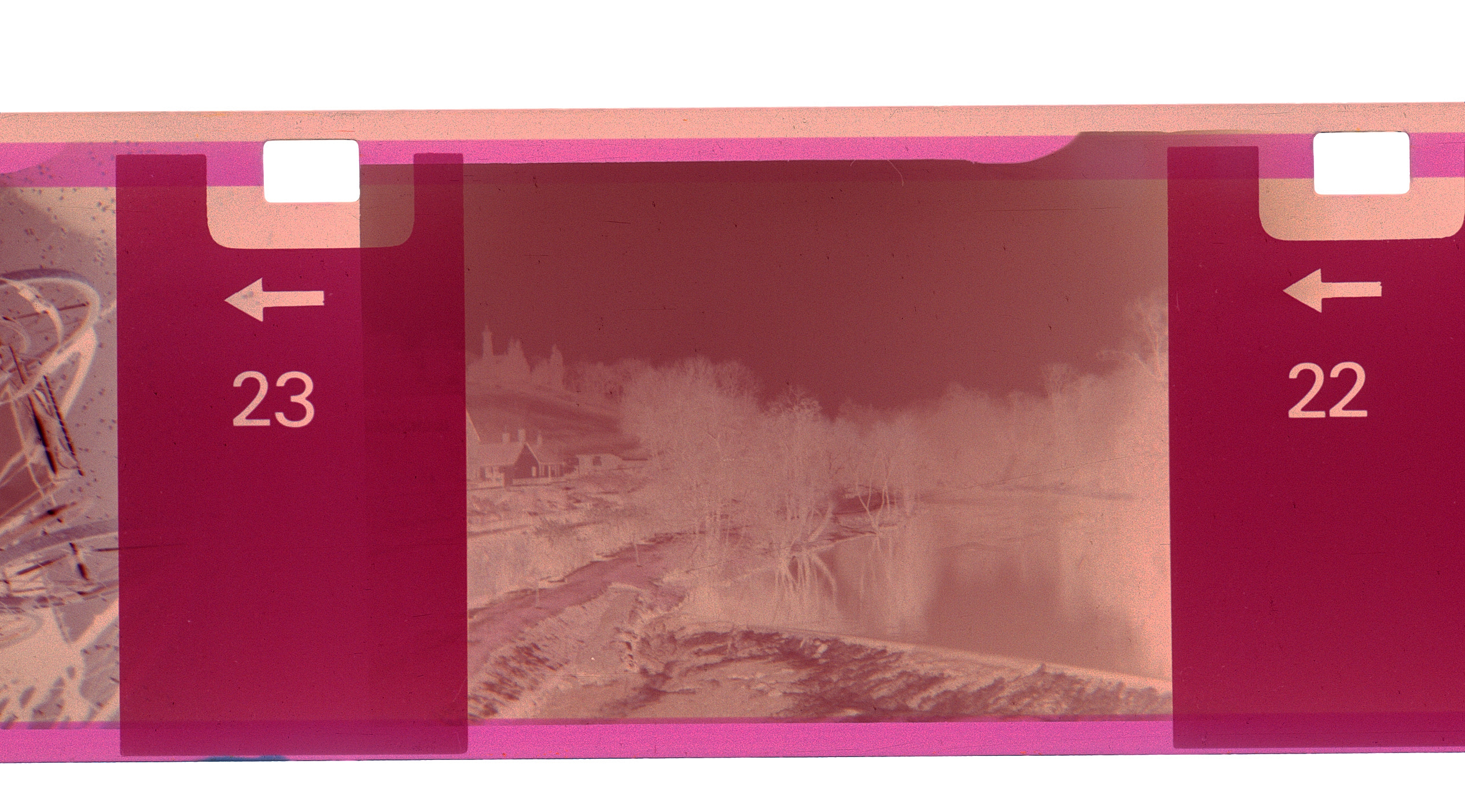
Closeup of part of a 110 negative seen through a film scanner

Although the format is most closely associated with cheaply produced, low-cost cameras, Canon, Minolta, Minox, Pentax, Rollei, Voigtländer, and others, as well as Kodak, offered higher-priced 110 cameras, with multi-element focusing lenses and electronically controlled exposure systems. Such cameras provided greater control over the sharpness and exposure of the images on 110 film. Some of these cameras, designed to be compact, still hold appeal to subminiature-photography enthusiasts.

The small negative size of 110 film makes it difficult to enlarge successfully. For these reasons, the 110 format is associated with prints that are often rather grainy and unsharp. This has led to the misconception that the cartridge itself is incapable of holding film flat enough for making high-quality negatives.

The 110 cartridge, as specified by Kodak, has a plastic tab on one end. Camera designers had the option of using this tab to sense film speed, enabling sophisticated cameras to switch between high- and low-speed film. A short tab indicated high-speed film, and a long tab indicated low-speed film. Kodak left it to the film manufacturer to decide which film speeds were high or low. Only a few cameras took advantage of this feature: Rollei A110, Canon 110 ED 20, Minolta 110 Zoom SLR Mark I/II, Minox 110S, Voigtlander Vitoret 110 EL, Pentax Auto 110 and the Kodak Ektralite 10.

Some manufacturers would vary the low speed ASA setting and then change it in later models. For example, Minox 110S low speed was 64 ASA (Kodachrome then being made for 110) and high 400 ASA: but Canon 110 ED has 80 ASA only, with the 110 ED 20 having 80 and 400 ASA.

The last 110 film that Kodak produced was ISO 400 speed packed in a cartridge that senses as "low" speed. As shown in the photograph to the right, these cartridges can be modified by hand so that they signal the proper speed to the camera.

== Film types ==
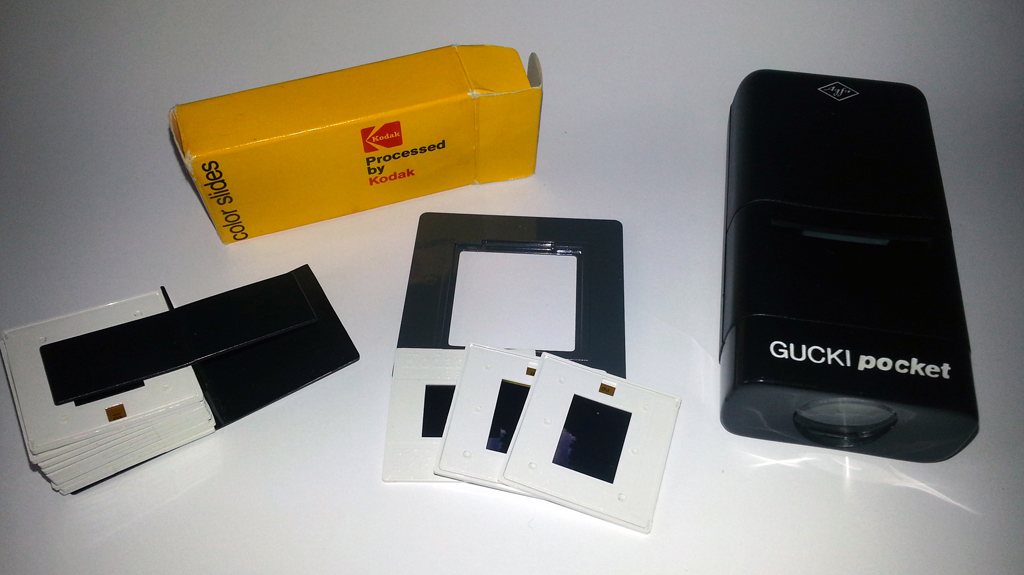
Three mini slides from 110 film, along with the box they came in from the lab, the plastic slide holder that was inside the box, a standard-format slide adapter, and a battery-powered pocket slide viewer for the mini slides

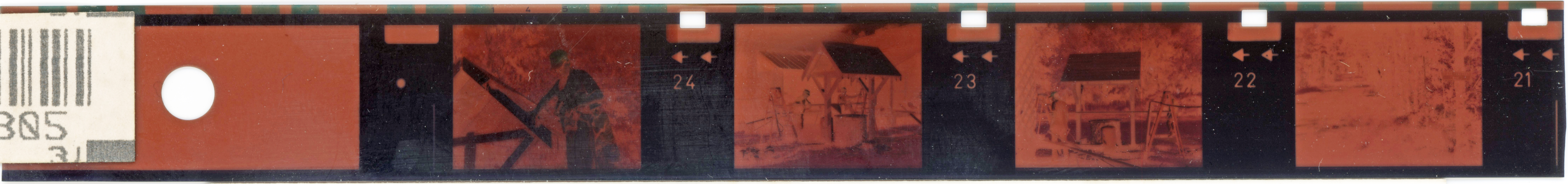
Negative strip

Although the format is commonly associated with print film, Kodak also produced Kodachrome 64 slide film in 110 cartridges until 1982.

In 2012 Lomography re-introduced slide film for 110 with their Peacock 200 ASA model. However, since not all 110 cameras have a settable ASA dial (low or high, depending on presence of a notch in the cassette), a neutral-density filter has to be used over the lens or the exposure compensation dial has to be used where available. Otherwise, over-exposure by a factor of x2 will result, leading to over-exposed images.

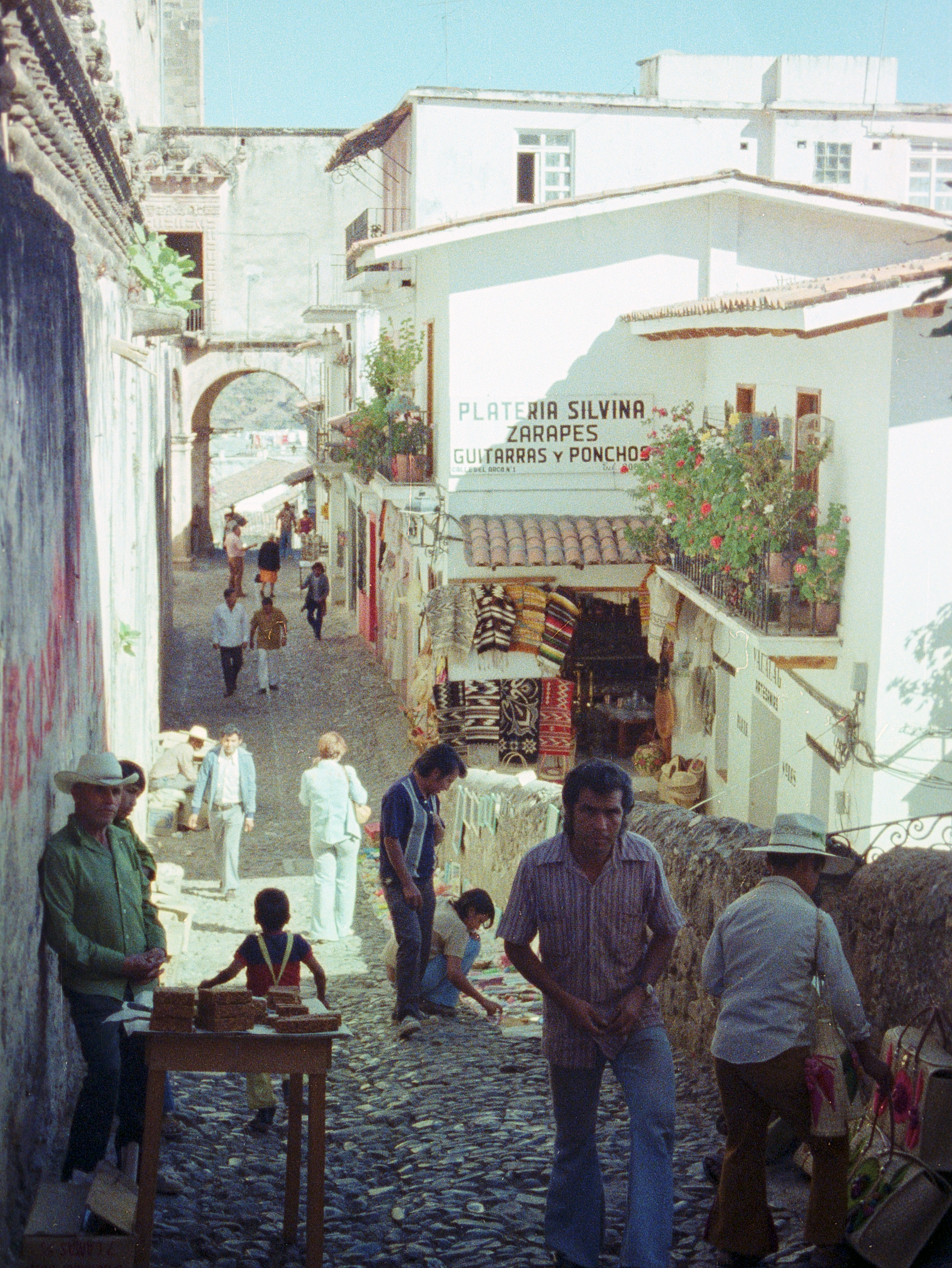
Typical 110 shot scanned from the original negative

Along with standard-sized slides that fit into standard projectors, 110 slide film could also be processed into smaller format slides. The latter requires special Pocket Carousel projectors, or the Leica 110 projector.

Kodak's Verichrome Pan was the only 110 black and white film produced until 2012, when Lomography manufactured their "Orca" Black and White film at 100 ISO speed. This speed is supported by most 110 cameras. Lomography went on to launch color, redscale, and slide film cartridges which, along with black and white, are the only 110 film types in production as of 2022.

== See also ==
- Film format
- List of color film systems
- List of photographic film formats
