= C-22 process =

Color film development process

Introduced by Kodak in 1956, C-22 is an obsolete process for developing color film, superseded by the C-41 process in 1972 for the launch of 110 film and in 1974 for all other formats.

The development of the film material is carried out at temperatures of around 75°F (24°C), making the process incompatible with the more modern C-41 process, which uses a temperature of 100°F (38°C). C-22 uses Color Developing Agent 3, unlike C-41, which uses Color Developing Agent 4.

The most common film requiring this process is Kodacolor-X.

C-22 film can still (as of 2020) be developed in black and white.
