= 616 film =

Photographic film format

616 film was originally produced by Kodak in 1932 for the Kodak Six-16 camera.

Seventy millimetres wide, the 616 film produced 63.5 mm × 108 mm (2.5" × 4.25") negatives, about the size of postcards and appropriate for making a contact print without the need for an enlarger. It is the same format as that of 116 film but on a slimmer spool, for use in more compact cameras. The format is used in many other cameras such as the Kodak Brownie Junior and the Kodak Target Six-16. The first "6" in the name refers to the number of frames that could originally be exposed on a single roll of film. To avoid customer confusion, the name was not changed when this was increased to eight exposures. From the 1930s on, 616 film became less and less popular in favor of 120 and other film formats—as film resolution became better and the use of enlargers common, the need for a large postcard-size negative became moot. The last 616 film cameras were made in 1948.

However, the film remained available for many years after that, and 616 film was finally discontinued in 1984.

== See also ==
- Film format
- List of color film systems
- List of still film formats
