= Film format =

Standardized set of characteristics for photographic film

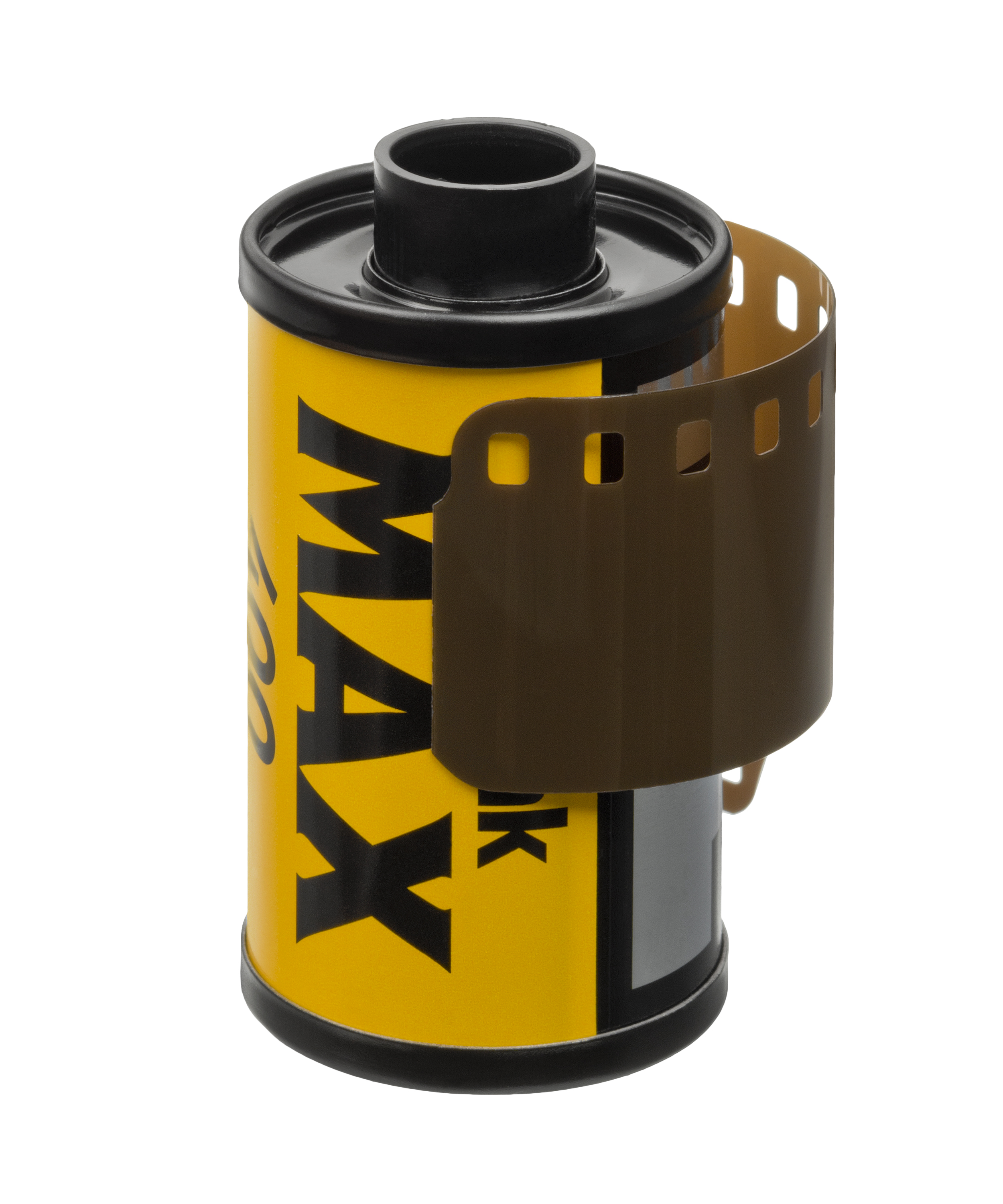
A cartridge of Kodak 35 mm (135) film for cameras.

A film format is a technical definition of a set of standard characteristics regarding image capture on photographic film for still images or film stock for filmmaking. It can also apply to projected film, either slides or movies. The primary characteristic of a film format is its size and shape.

In the case of motion picture film, the format sometimes includes audio parameters. Other characteristics usually include the film gauge, pulldown method, lens anamorphosis (or lack thereof), and film gate or projector aperture dimensions, all of which need to be defined for photography as well as projection, as they may differ.

== Motion picture film formats ==
- 35 mm movie film

== Photographic film formats ==
- 35mm film

== See also ==
- Film base
- Keykode
- Large format
- Medium format
- Microform
