= Subminiature photography =

Photography with film smaller than 35mm

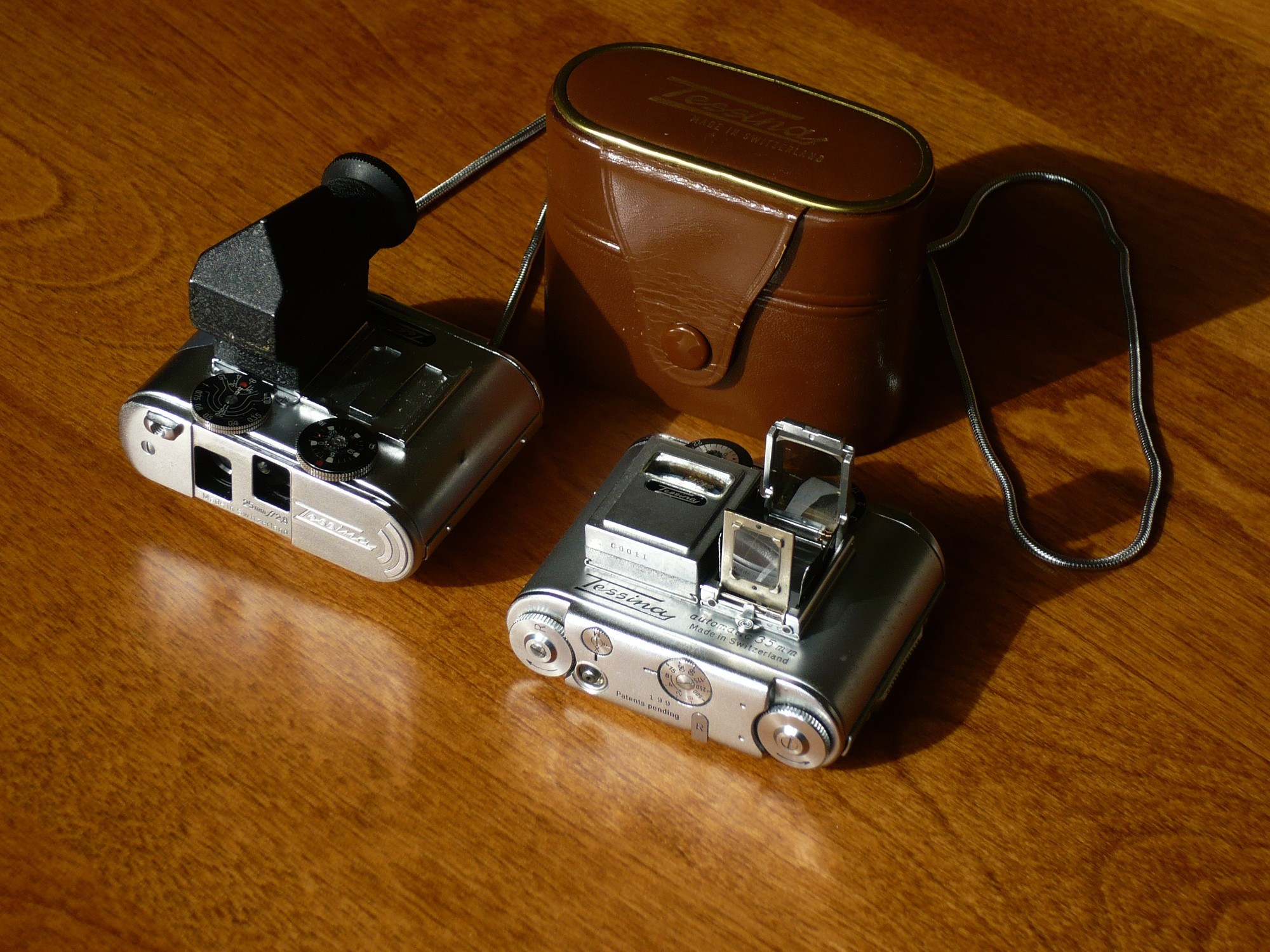
Tessina twin lens reflex subminiature camera

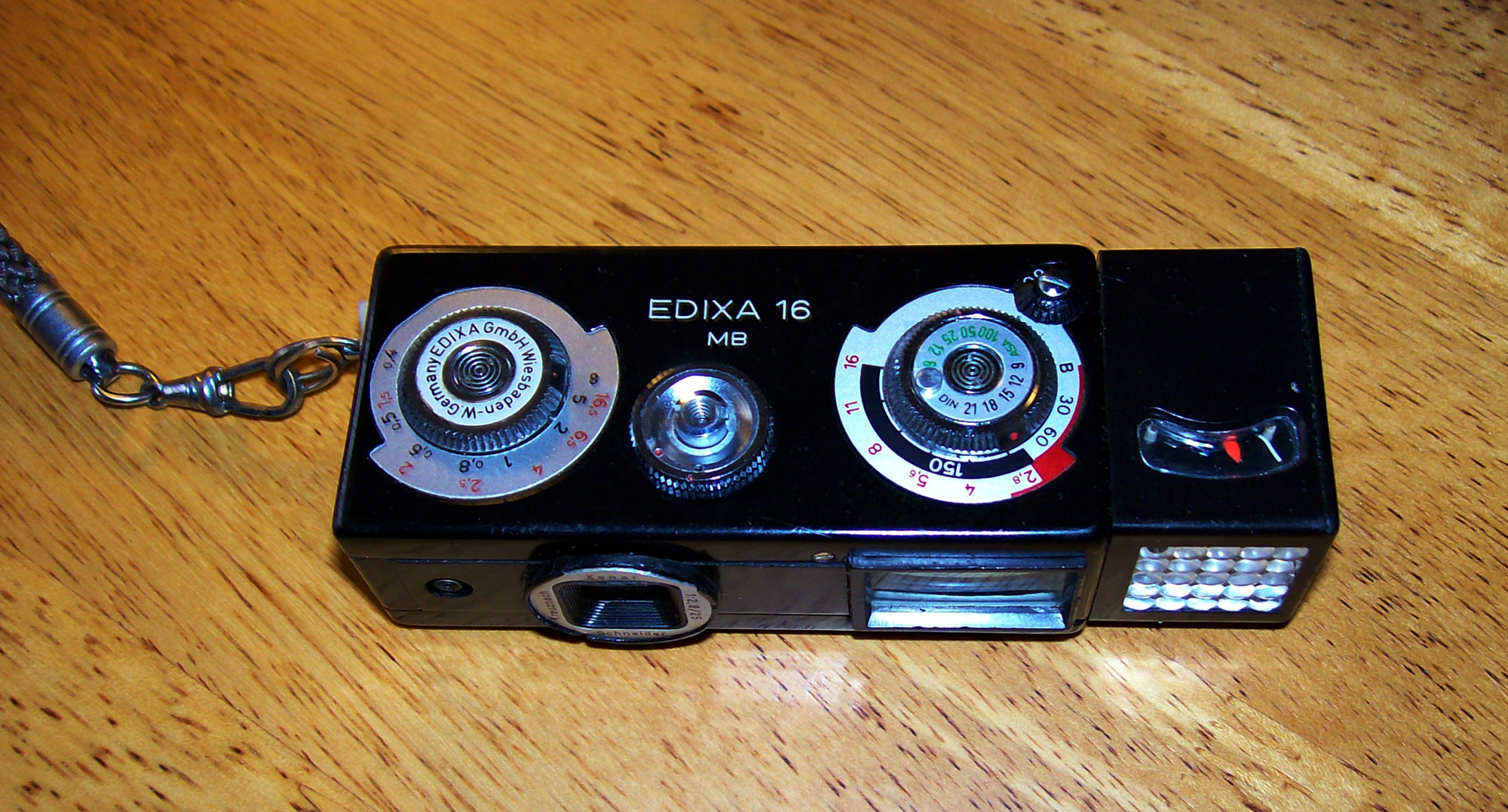
Edixa 16MB black camera

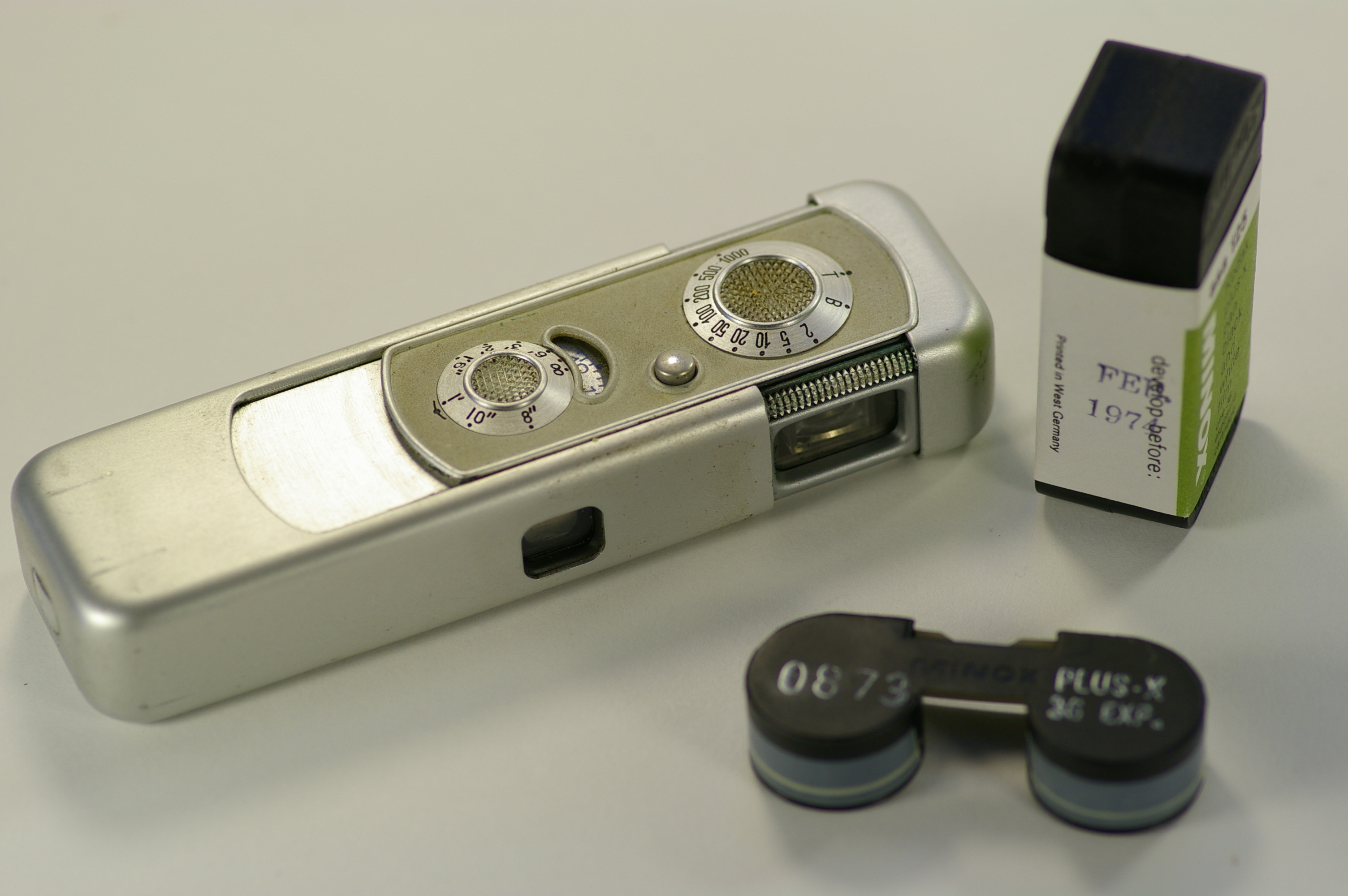
Minox IIIs camera with a Minox 8x11 mm cartridge of film

Subminiature photography is photographic technologies and techniques working with film material smaller in size than 35mm film, such as 16mm, 9.5mm, 17mm, or 17.5mm films. It is distinct from photomicrography, photographing microscopic subjects with a camera which is not particularly small.

== Definition ==
Subminiature — "very much reduced in size", Oxford English Dictionary.

A subminiature camera is a class of camera that is very much smaller than a "miniature camera". The term "miniature camera" was originally used to describe cameras using the 35 mm cine film as negative material for still photography; so cameras that used film smaller than 35mm were referred to as "sub-miniature". The smallest of these are often referred to as "ultra-miniature". Lipstick cameras and other small digital cameras are not included, because they don't use film. The smaller subminiature cameras, called ultraminiature cameras, particularly Minox, are associated with spying.

In short, some people define "subminiature camera" as one that uses film smaller than 35mm (even though some of these cameras are larger than full-framed 35mm cameras), but others define it any camera that has a film format smaller than the standard 35mm format of 24x36mm (even though some of these cameras are larger than full-framed 35mm cameras).

== Types ==
There are many subminiature camera types. Minox, followed by Tessina, GaMi, Rollei, Yashica, Mamiya, Gemflex, Stylophot and Minolta are the best-known manufacturers. All made small, precision cameras and a few were still in production in 2006 but by 2011, only the Minox TLX model was still in production. Production stopped by 2012. Getting film and processing for most smaller cameras is a challenge as they are no longer manufactured or supported. Most require cutting your own film and home-processing. But recently due to the rise of film again, a decent portion of film places now develop it along with many other types of film except Kodachrome in correlation to 110 film.

The best known subminiature formats are—in increasing size—Minox (8×11 mm), Kodak disc (8×10 mm), 16 mm (10×14 mm), Super 16 mm (12×17 mm), 110 film (13×17 mm), 17.5mm for HIT camera( for example TONE camera), and the Advanced Photo System (APS) with different aspect ratios on 24 mm film. While many subminiature cameras were inexpensive and poorly manufactured (thus giving the format a bad name), Minox, Gami, Edixa, Rollei, Pentax and Minolta made quality cameras capable of producing fine results—even when enlarged. Some of these formats, or non-standard cartridges loaded with an otherwise standard ciné format, are best described as specialised (e.g., Minox or Sharan); half-frame 35 mm uses standard 35 mm film; cameras such as 110 and disc were aimed at the mass market.

The first subminiature single lens reflex is the Russian Narciss camera produced in 1961-65.

First making an appearance in the late 1930s, often as concealed cameras, sub-miniature cameras became popular soon after WWII when many consumer markets required small, inexpensive cameras such as the Petie in Germany. Friedrich Kaftansky's Mini-flex was designed in 1931, on the market in 1933. Walter Zapp's Riga Minox appeared in 1938. Kodak's introduction of the 110 camera in the 1970s and the Kodak disc camera in the 1980s brought the sub-miniature camera to the forefront of the photographic market. It was very attractive to users wanting a smaller, flat, package. In 1988, Kodak announced that they were halting film camera production, having made over 25m cameras. It was thought that Chinese manufacturers made over that number alone. In 1998, Kodak announced that Kodak disc film production was stopping. The 8x11mm Minox film format has retained special interest far beyond its original design life, because any film can be trimmed to work into its re-useable cassettes. No sprockets are needed in the film to make the camera film transport function. Minox also offered a developing tank that can be loaded with cassettes in daylight, which has continued in popularity, and copied by Minolta, and Yashica for its own models.

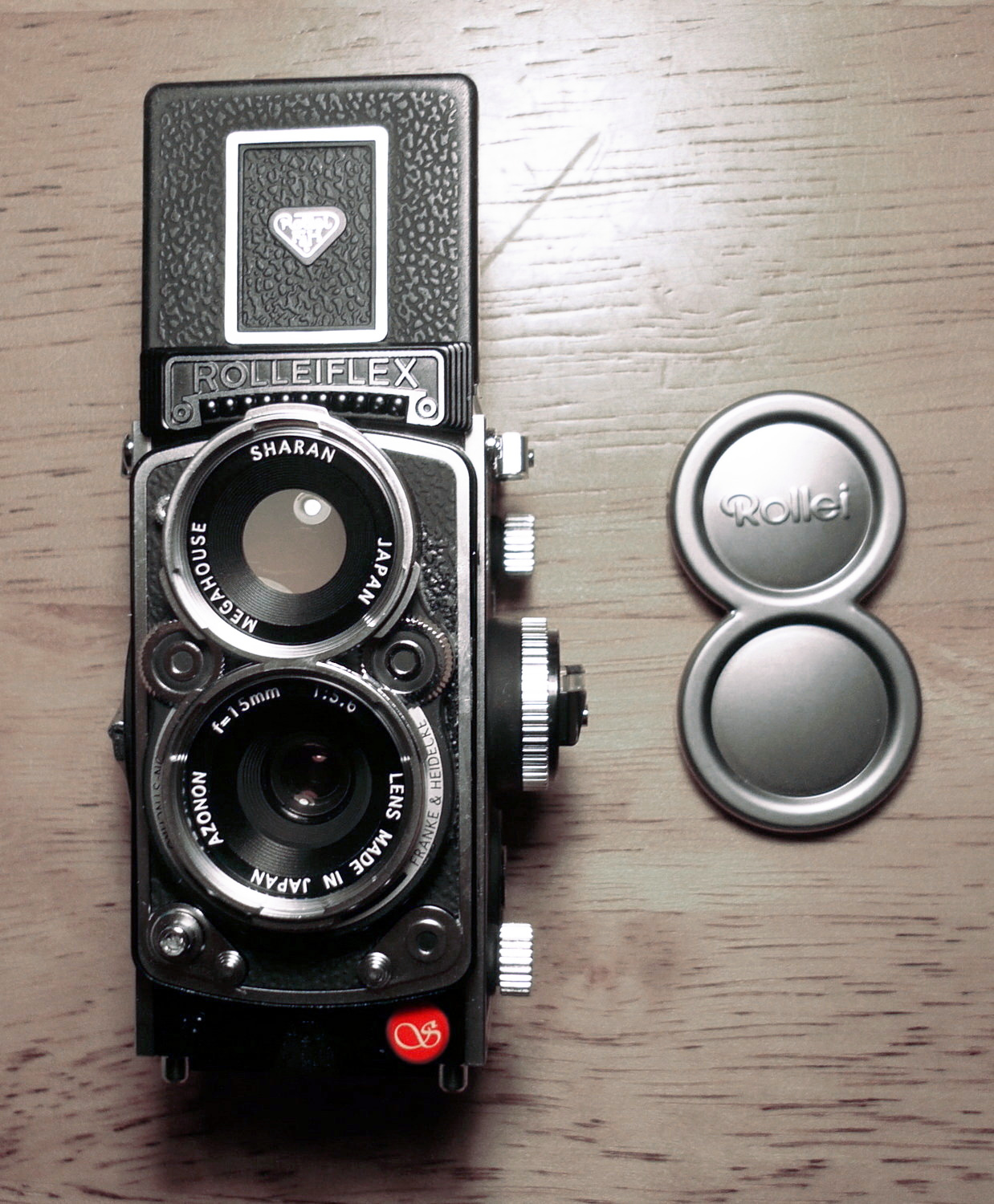
1/3 scale mini twin lens reflex using Minox film

Various formats of sub-miniature camera have come and gone over the years as newer formats have replaced older ones. Many larger format cameras, especially 35 mm, became smaller in size and weight—partly due to the consumer demand for smaller cameras—and were able to replace some subminiature formats. For example, full-frame 35 mm cameras, such as the Minox 35 and the Olympus XA, were made as small as possible. Most other subminiature cameras are still usable if film can be obtained, particularly if the photographer is prepared to do the processing.

== Subminiature camera film ==
- 16mm perforated or unperforated bulk roll film by Agfa, Kodak, Fujifilm in 100 ft to 1000 ft.
- Using film slitter to slit 35mm roll film or 120 film into Minox format film or 16mm film.
- 110 film is still manufactured by Lomography
- Disc and APS film is available but expired, the former from 1998 and latter from 2012

== Subminiature photography technique ==
Focusing

The process of focusing a subminiature camera is the same as any other camera:

- Unit focusing: the entire lens is moved back and forth relative to the film plane. Examples: Minox B, C, LX, TLX; Edixa 16, Tessina. Minox 110, Monolta 16
- Front element focusing: Rollei 16, Rollei 110.
- Fixed focus, feasible with the great depth of field of short focal length lenses: Minox EC, Minox ECX.
- Internal focusing is not used.

The small size of the camera and film require the use of a lens with short focal length, and hence great depth of field. This simplifies focusing to some extent.

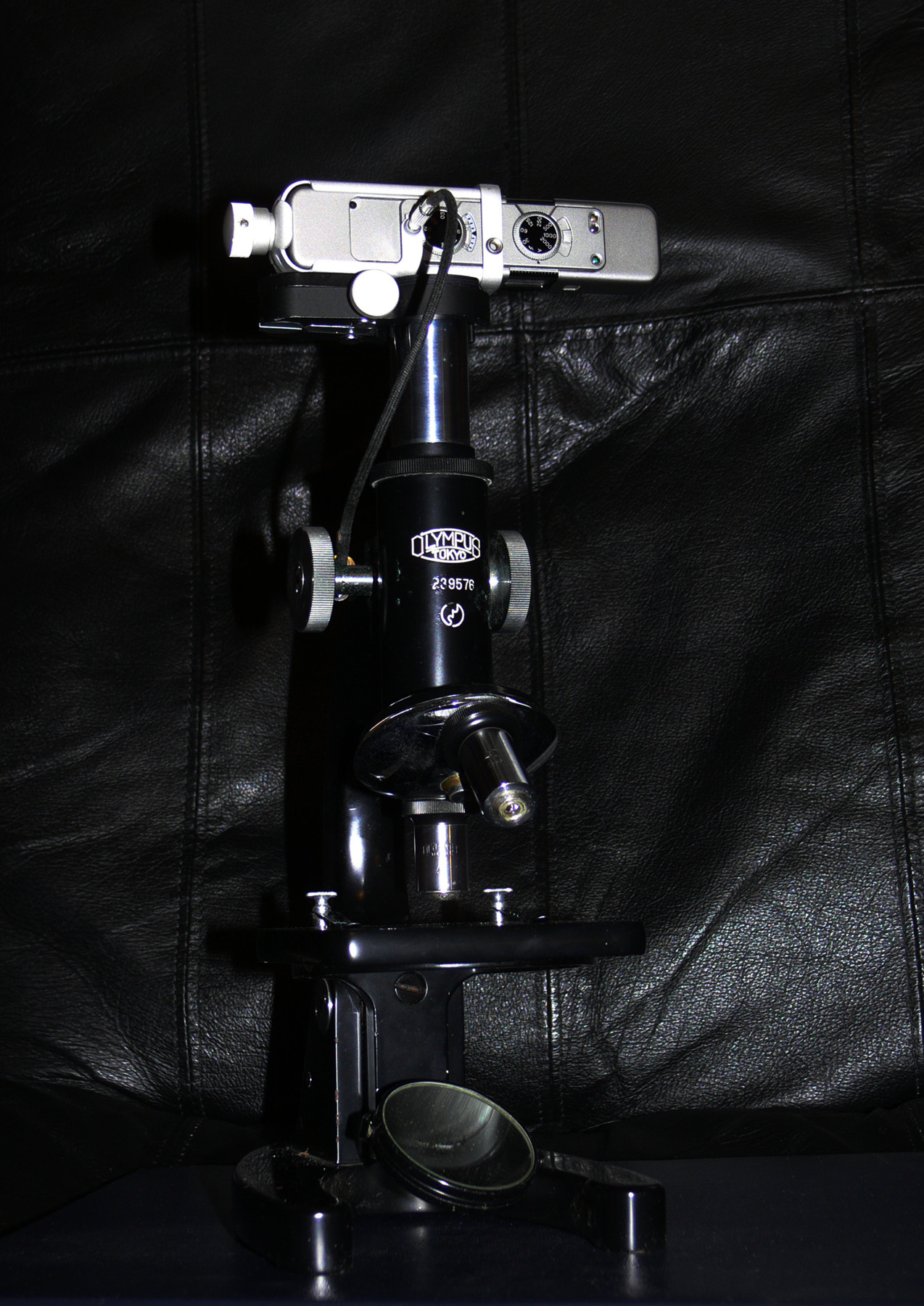
Minox TLX attached to a 400x microscope

The simplest system is to use a lens with fixed focus set at the hyperfocal distance. This will produce images that are acceptably sharp from infinity to some near plane (usually five to eight feet away). This system is used in most cheaper cameras. More complex systems allow variable focus, through a dial or slider. Many cameras with this system have distance markings on the control; it is up to the user to set the focus according to the distance to the subject. Most Minox cameras use this system.

Some subminiature cameras include a rangefinder, for example the Minox 110. These increase the size. Autofocus or through-the-lens focusing systems are not used on subminiature cameras to reduce the size requirements.

Macro photography

Subminiature cameras are less suited to macro photography than larger cameras, although the relatively large depth of field at close distances is an advantage. Where concealment is required, subminiature cameras are required; they (particularly the various Minox models) are well known as spy cameras, where they were used to photograph documents close up. Minox cameras for these purposes come with a 24-inch measuring chain attached, with markings corresponding to certain distances, to assist in focusing at these short ranges.

Telephoto

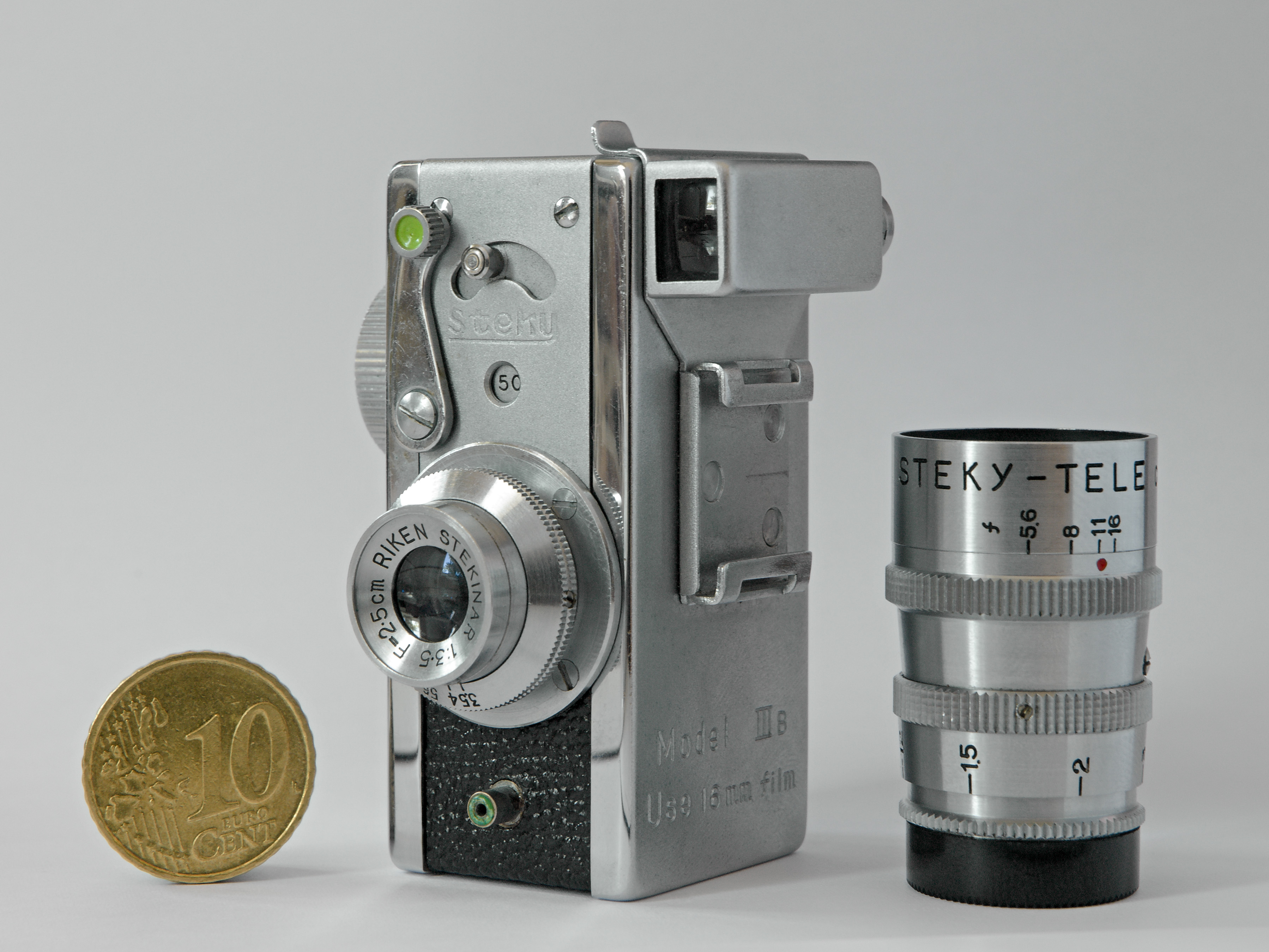
Steky III B with tele lens

Few subminiature cameras have interchangeable lenses, which reduce the advantages of a small size system. Telephoto lenses for such small formats essentially do not exist, except for Steky and Gami. There have been attachments to allow cameras (generally Minox) to attach to telescopes or binoculars, but these give results of lower quality than the camera's optics can achieve.

Developing and enlarging

- Nikor or Jobo 16mm development reel
- Nikor 9.2mm or Jobo 8x11 development reel
- Minox daylight development tank
- 10x14mm, 12x17mm, 14x21mm and 8x11mm negative carrier used with 35mm enlarger.
- Minox enlarger with 15mm Micro-Minox enlarging lens

== Gallery ==
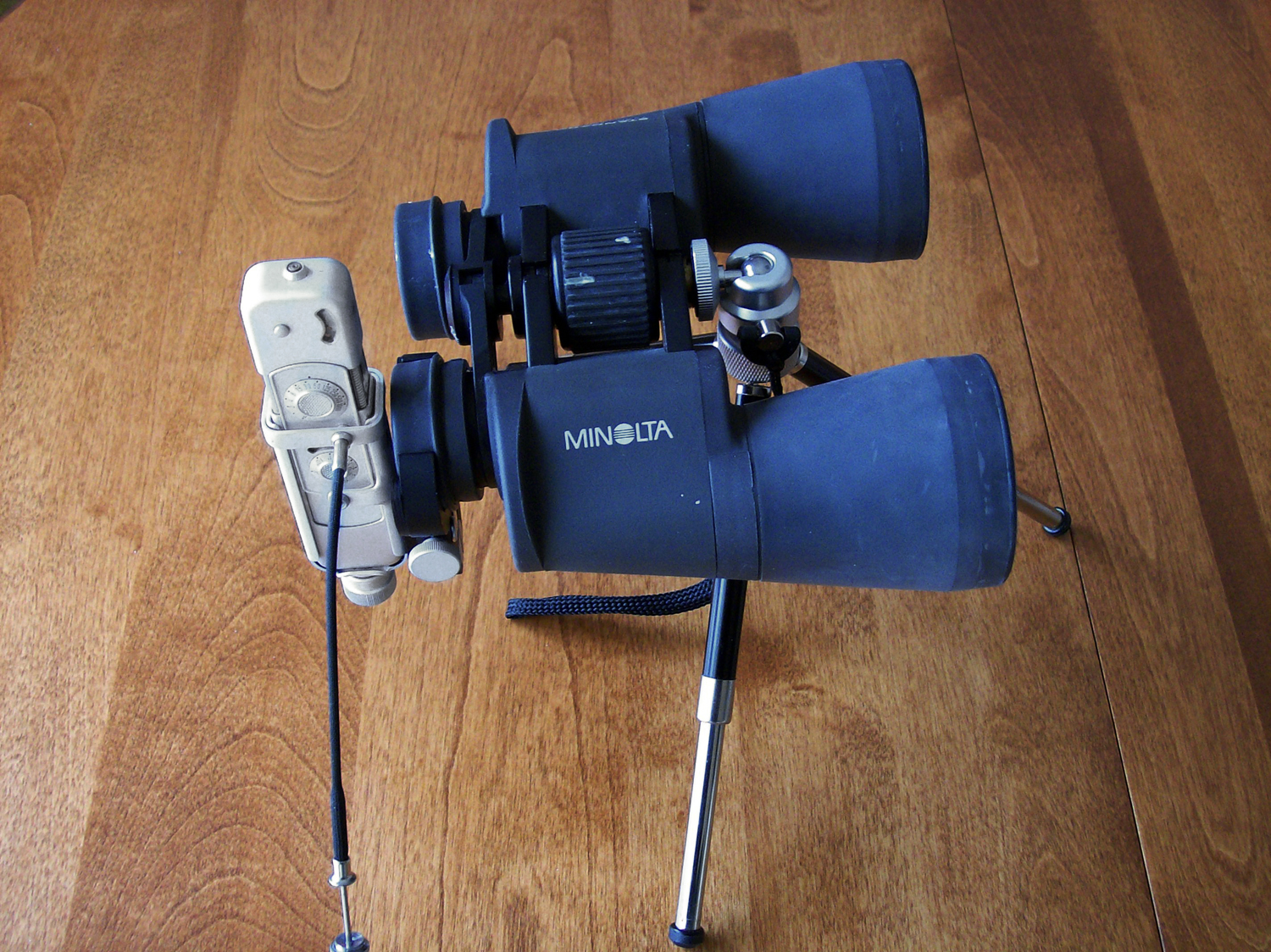
Minox BL with an 8x35 binocular for telephotography

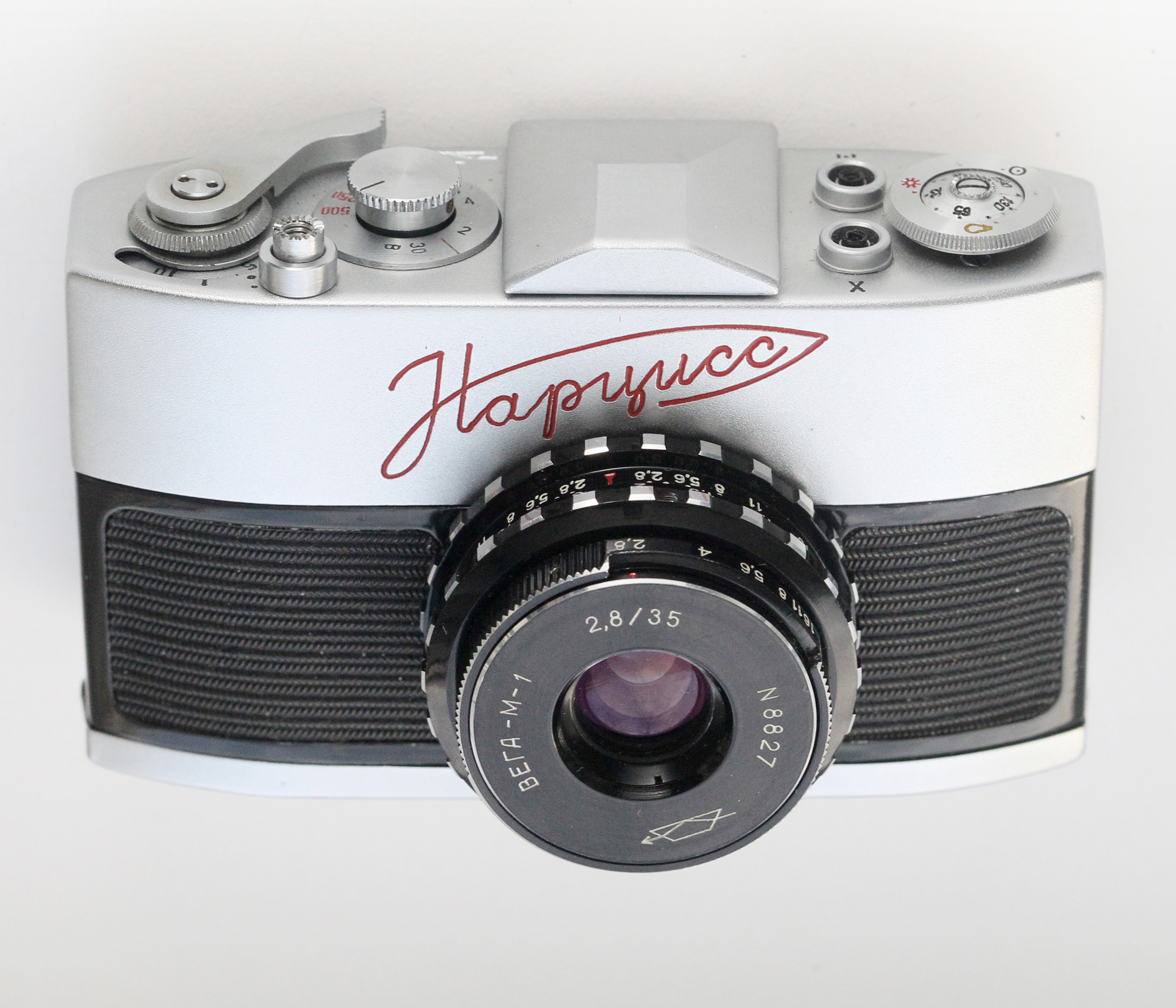
Russian KMZ Narciss 16mm SLR

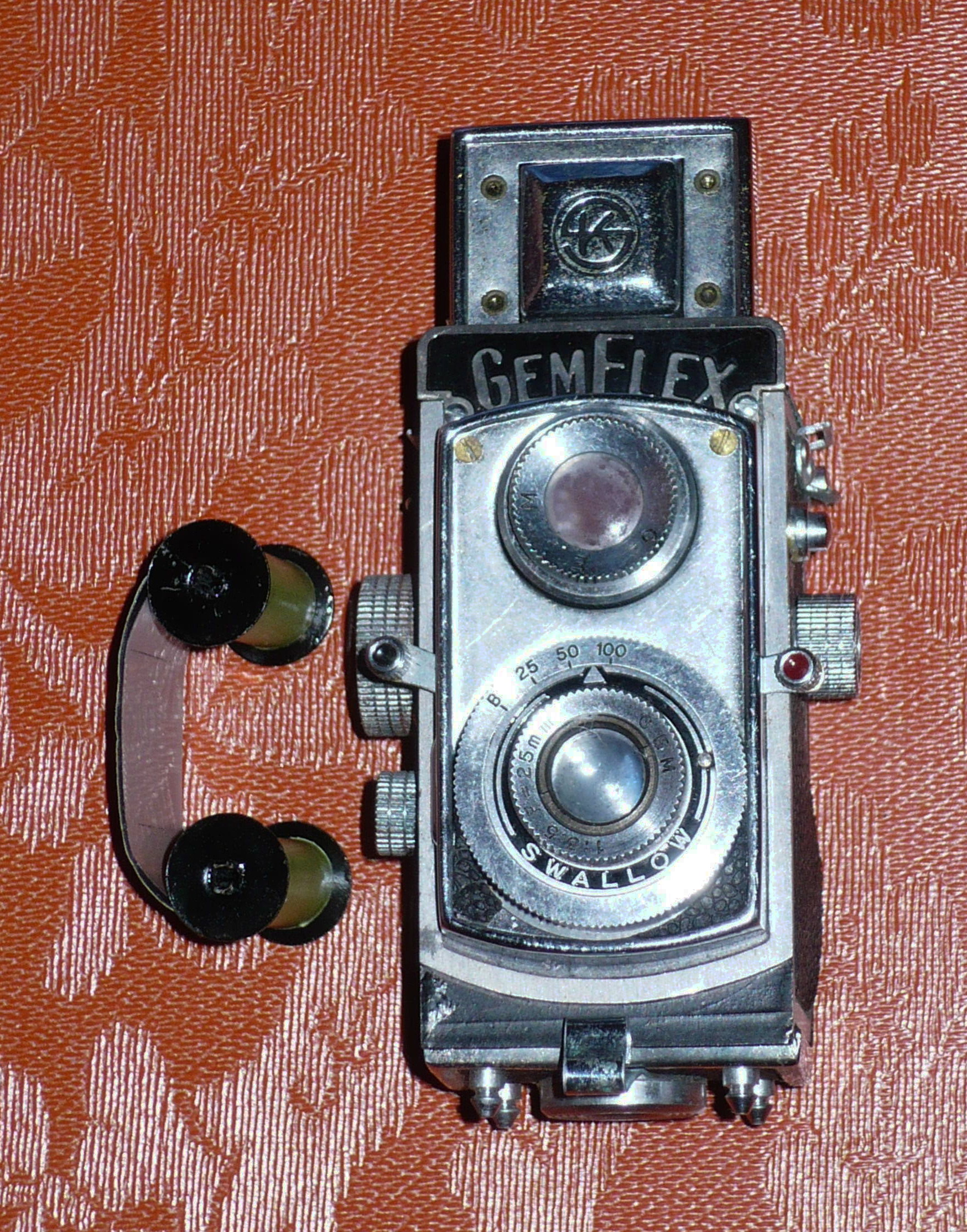
Gemflex twin lens reflex camera

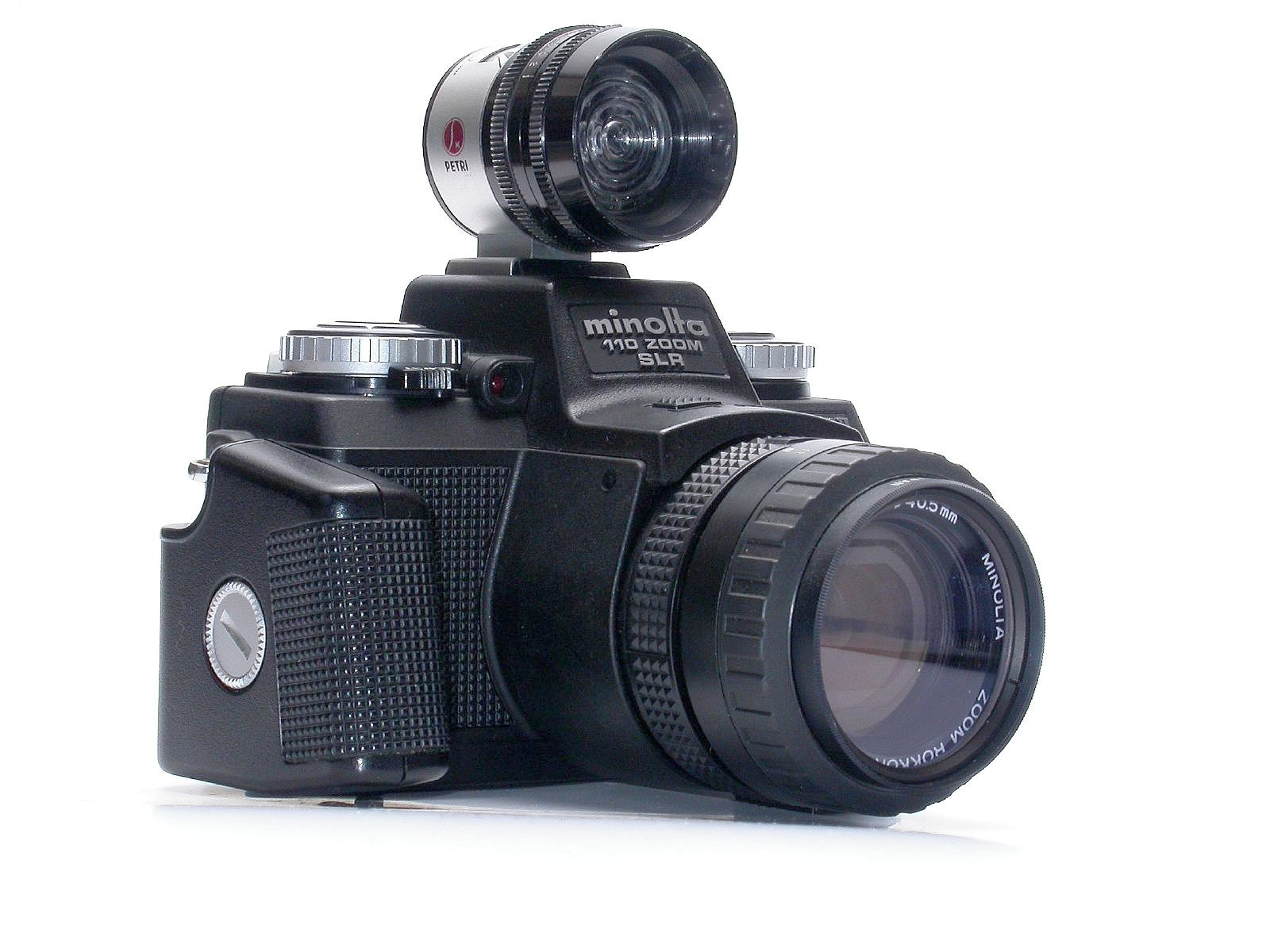
Minolta 110 Zoom SLR Mk II, manufactured 1979—1982, with a Petri light meter mounted on its hot shoe.

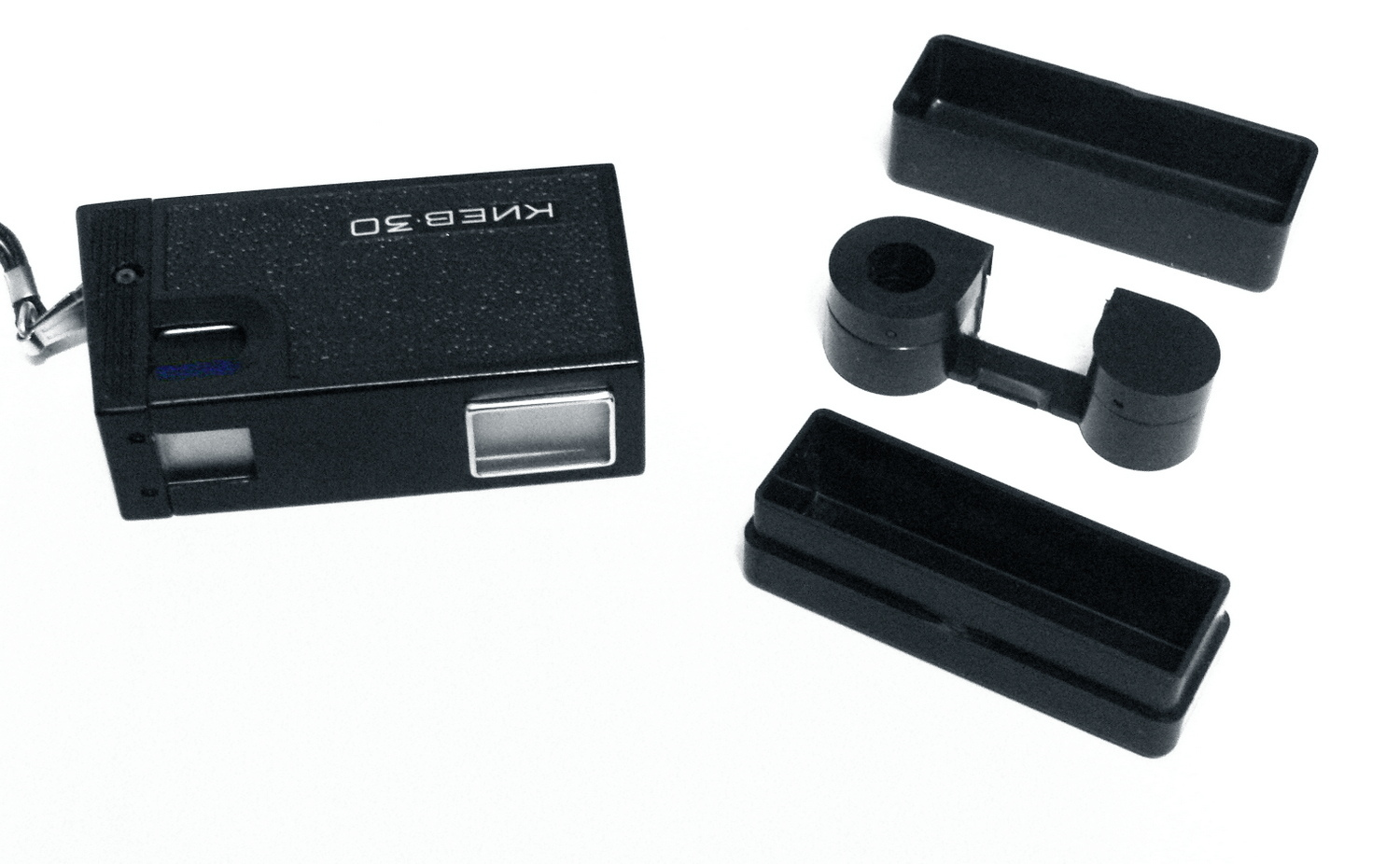
Kiev 30 16mm subminiature camera with cassette

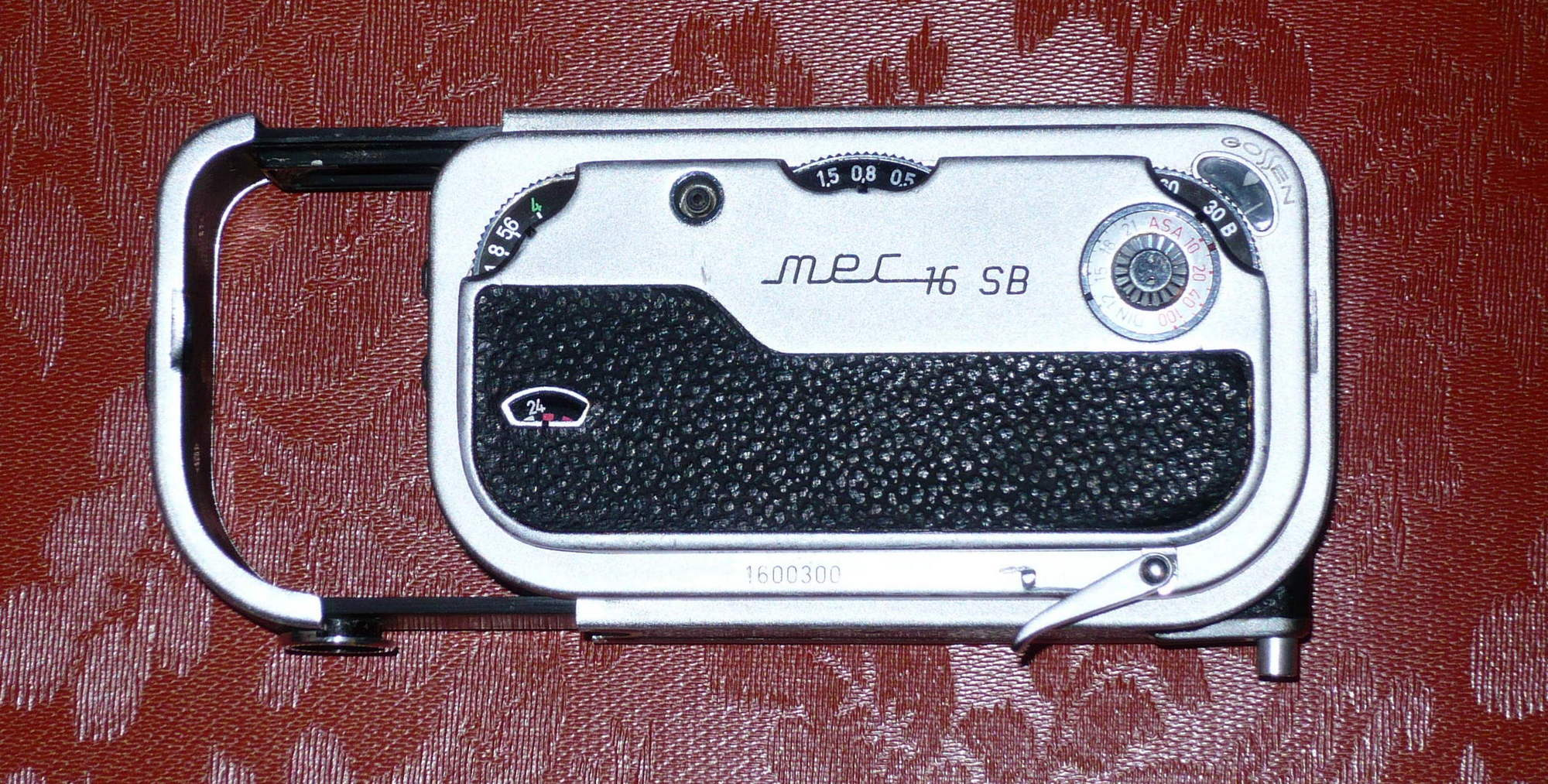
MEC-16 SB

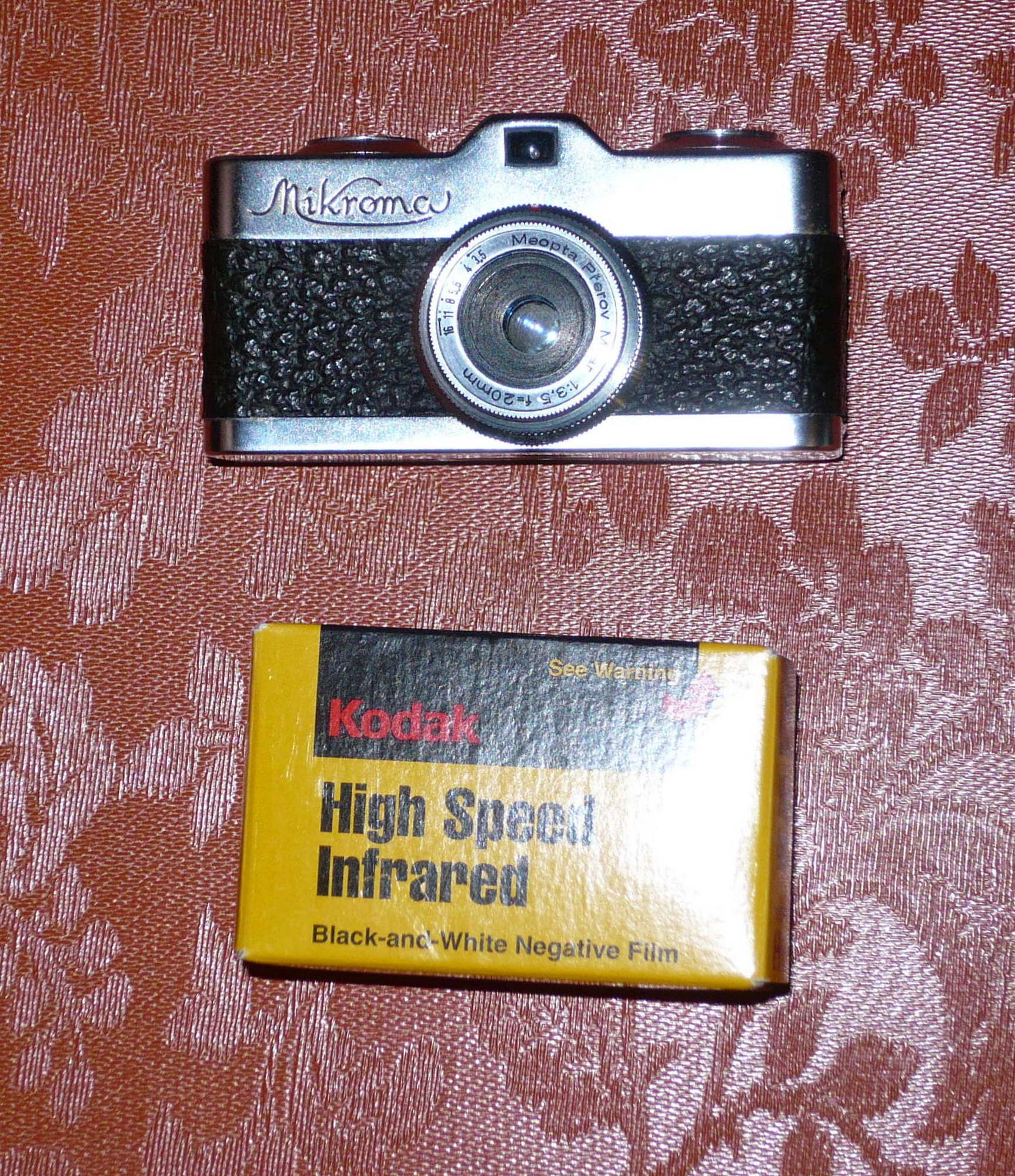
Meopta Mikroma II 16mm camera

== See also ==
- Microform
- Pigeon photography
