= Film slitter =

Photography device

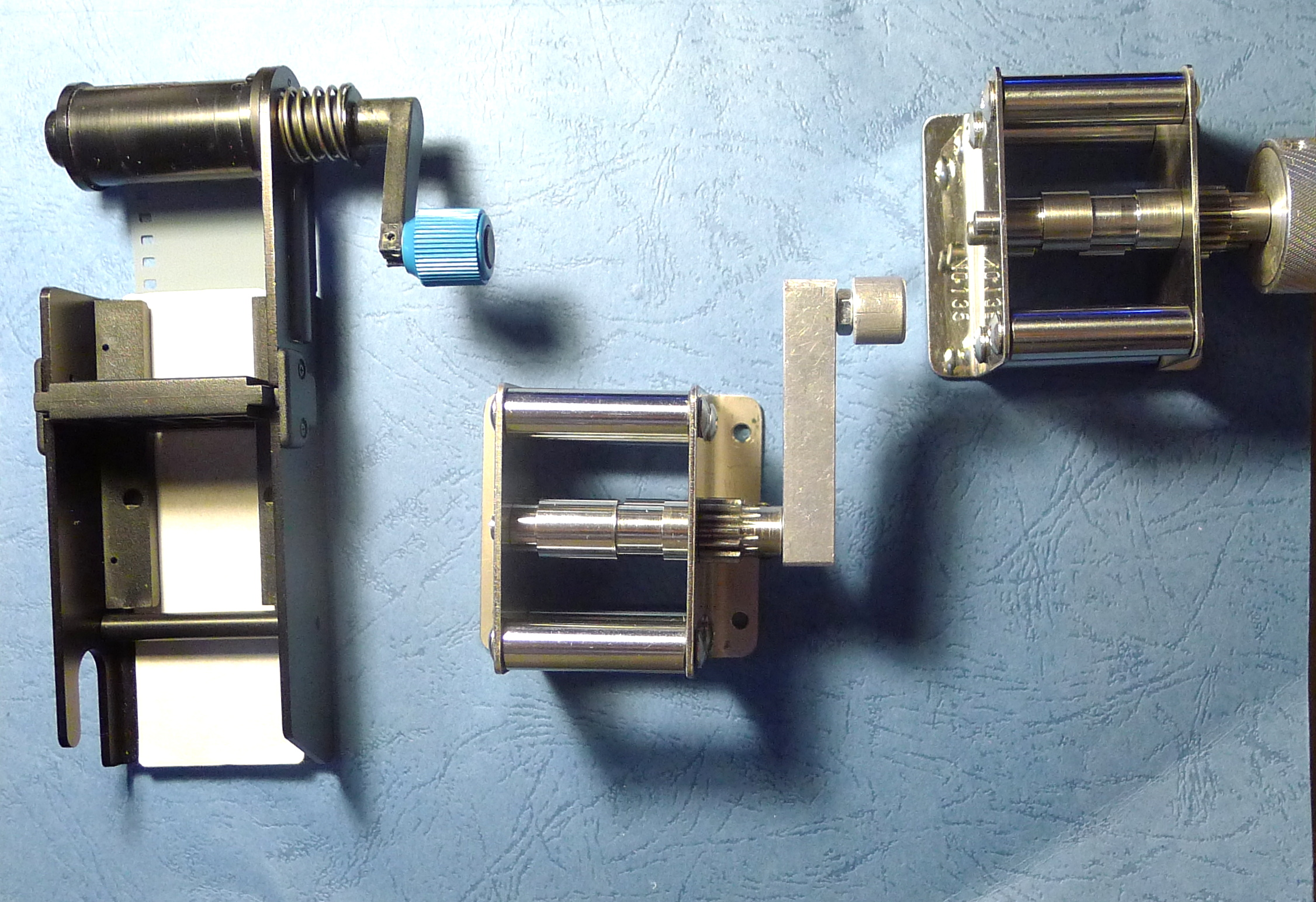
various film slitters

A film slitter, sometimes also called film splitter, is a device used in subminiature photography to slit 135 or 120 roll film into 16mm film or Minox film for use in subminiature cameras.

The earliest film slitter was made in the 1950s by Suzuki Optical Works in Japan for use with their Echo-8 subminiature camera. This film slitter consists of a roller cutter which slits a strip of double-perforated 16mm film in half, into two strips of perforated 8mm film for Echo-8 camera

== Types of film slitter ==
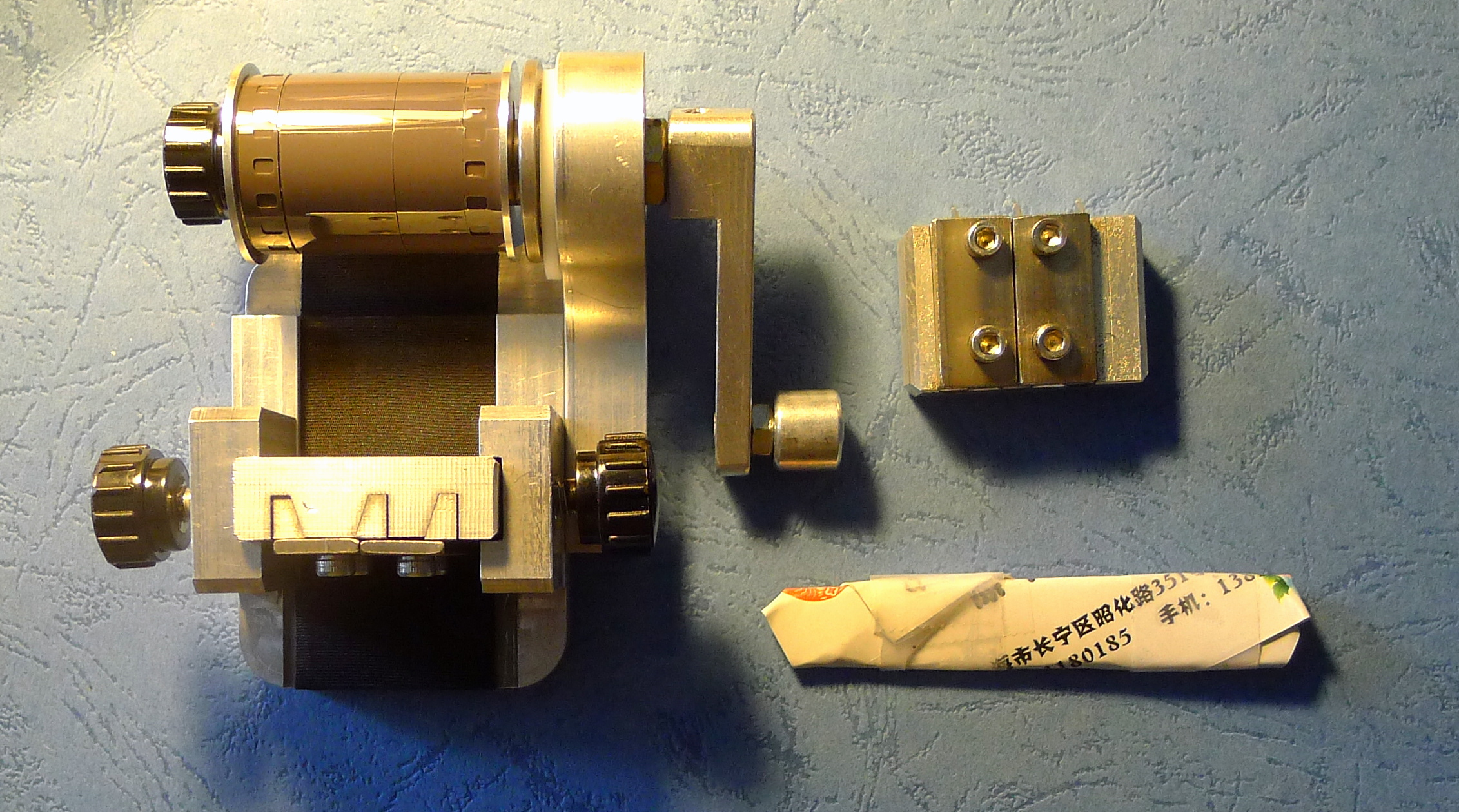
Knife block film slitter

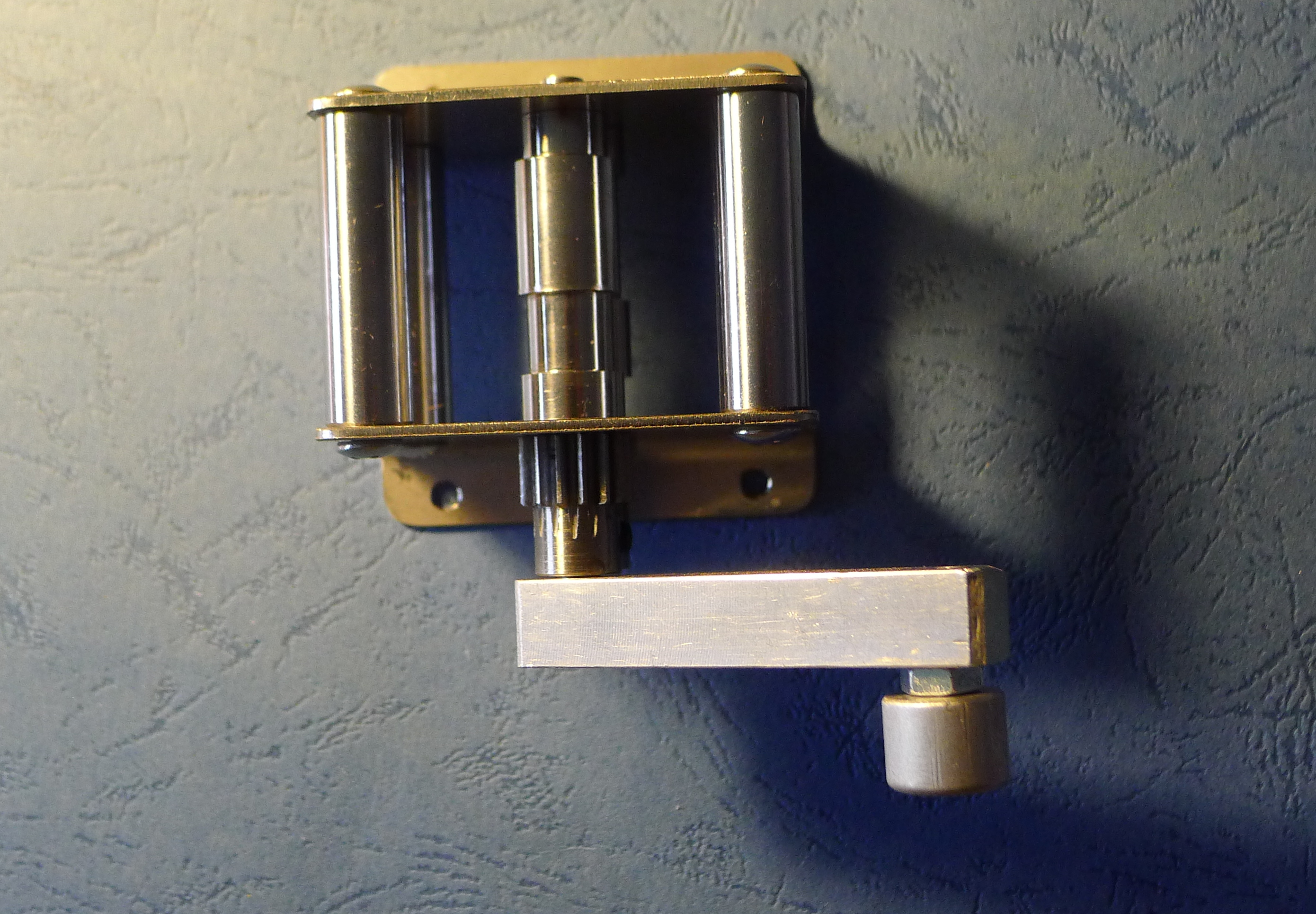
Roller film slitter

One type of film slitter uses three sharp blades in a block fixture to cut 35mm or 120 roll film into subminiature film.

Another type of slitter uses a roller cutter to cut 35mm film into two strips of Minox film or one strip of Minox film plus one strip of 16mm film
