= Petie =

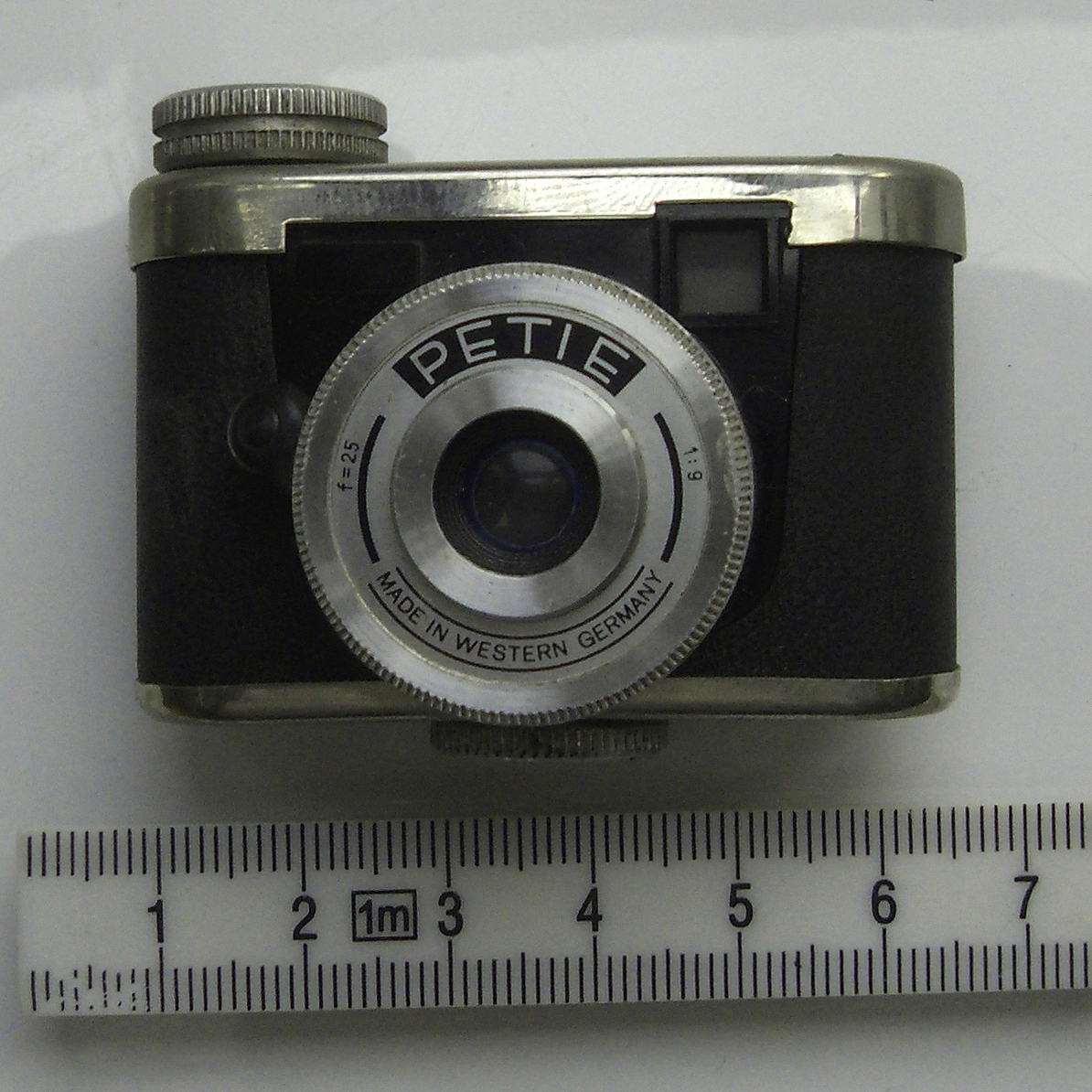
Subminiature camera PETIE

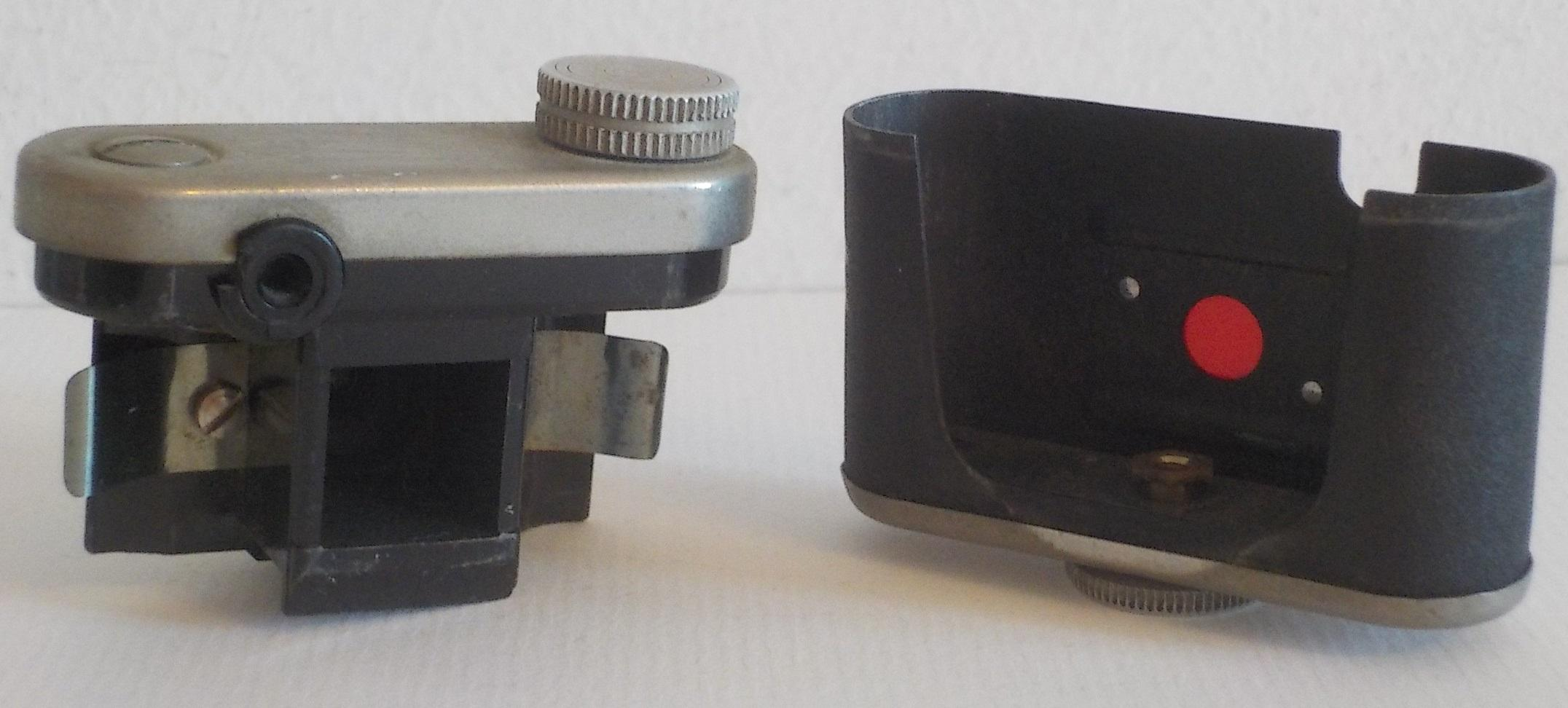
PETIE camera opened.

Petie cameras were subminiature cameras manufactured and distributed by Walter Kunik of Frankfurt am Main, West Germany, during the 1950s and 1960s.

== Description ==
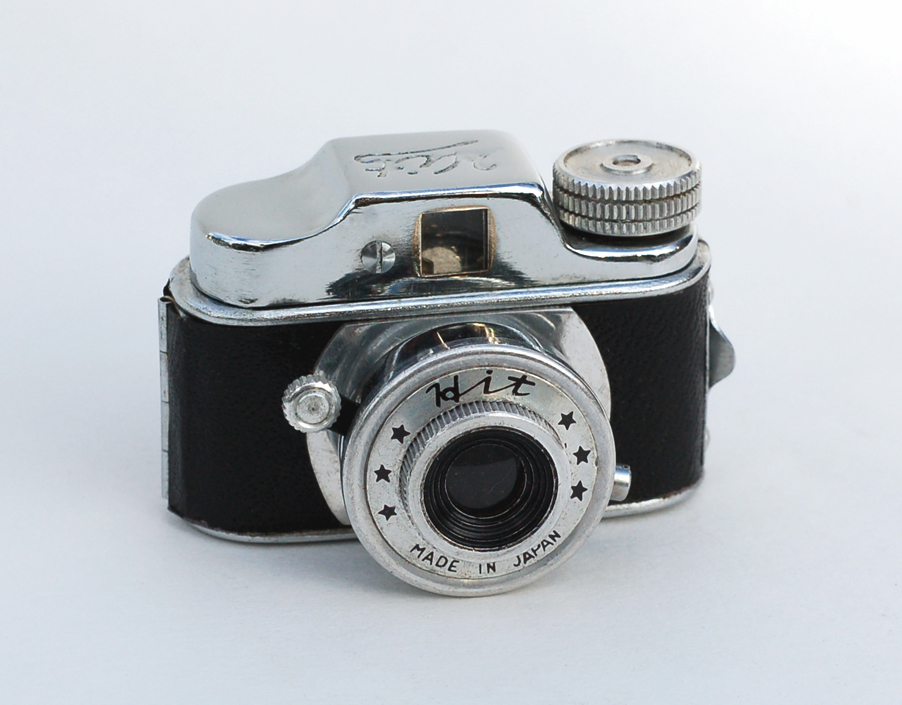
Typical Hit-type camera

At the end of World War II Japan produced simple, tiny and inexpensive Hit-type cameras designed for the war-torn and destitute home market. The Petie camera was created under similar conditions in post-war Germany. These cameras used 16mm film, against the 17.5mm film of the Japanese cameras, but both used paper-backed film and created 14mm square images. The Petie had a 20mm (f9.0) fixed-focus lens and a shutter speed set at 1/50 sec. The 1955 model came with a meniscus lens, later replaced with an achromatic lens. It came with accessories such as a closeup lens, yellow filter, lens hood, table top tripod, and case. All subsequent Kunik models were based on this one.
