= Minolta 110 Zoom SLR =

110 film format single-lens reflex camera

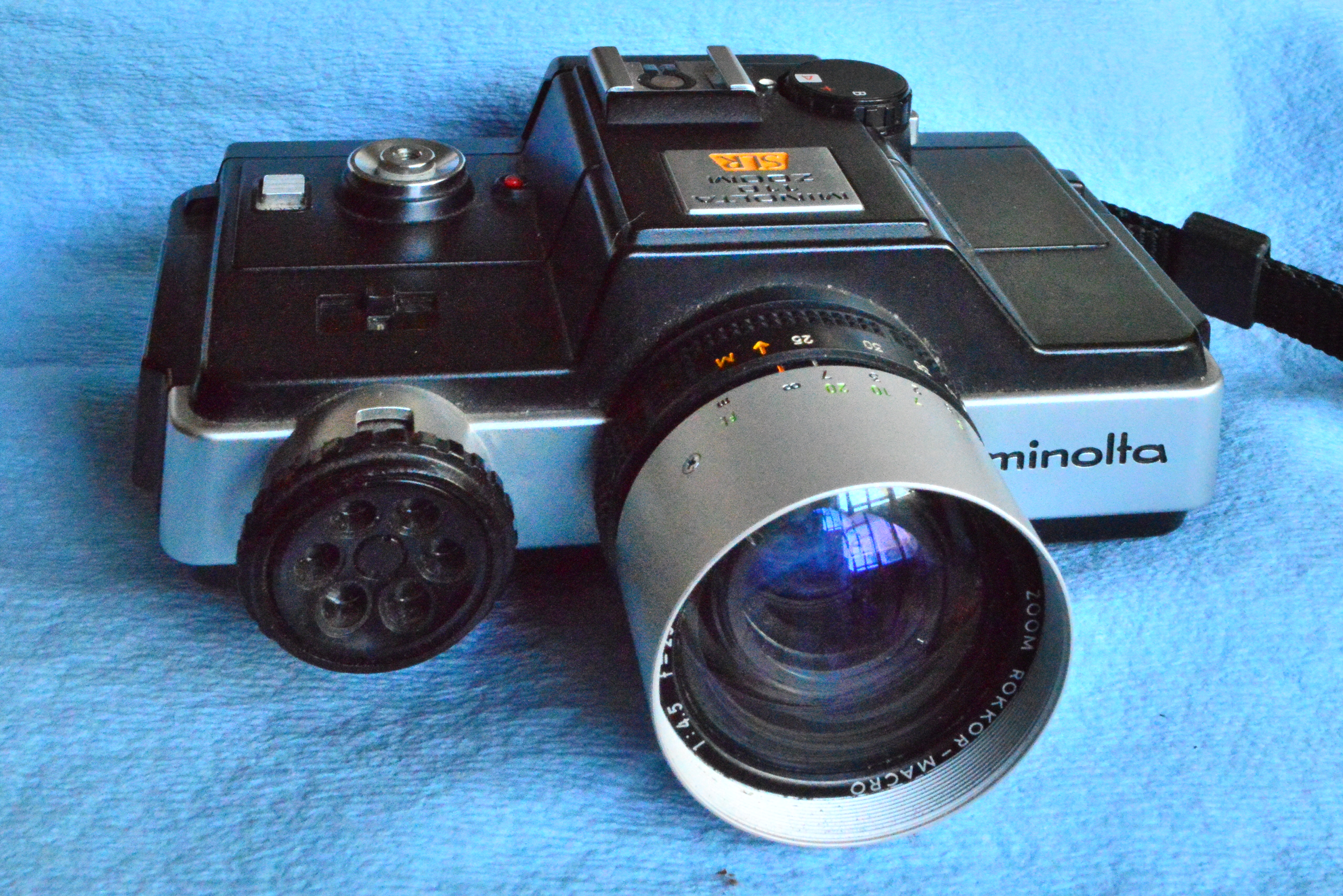

Overview
- Type: 110 submini SLR

Lens
- Lens mount: Fixed 25-50 mm zoom lens

Focusing
- Focus: Manual focus

Exposure/metering
- Exposure: Aperture priority autoexposure

Flash
- Flash: Hot shoe only

General
- Dimensions: 53.5 x 108 x 132 mm, 430 g

Minolta 110 Zoom SLR Mk II
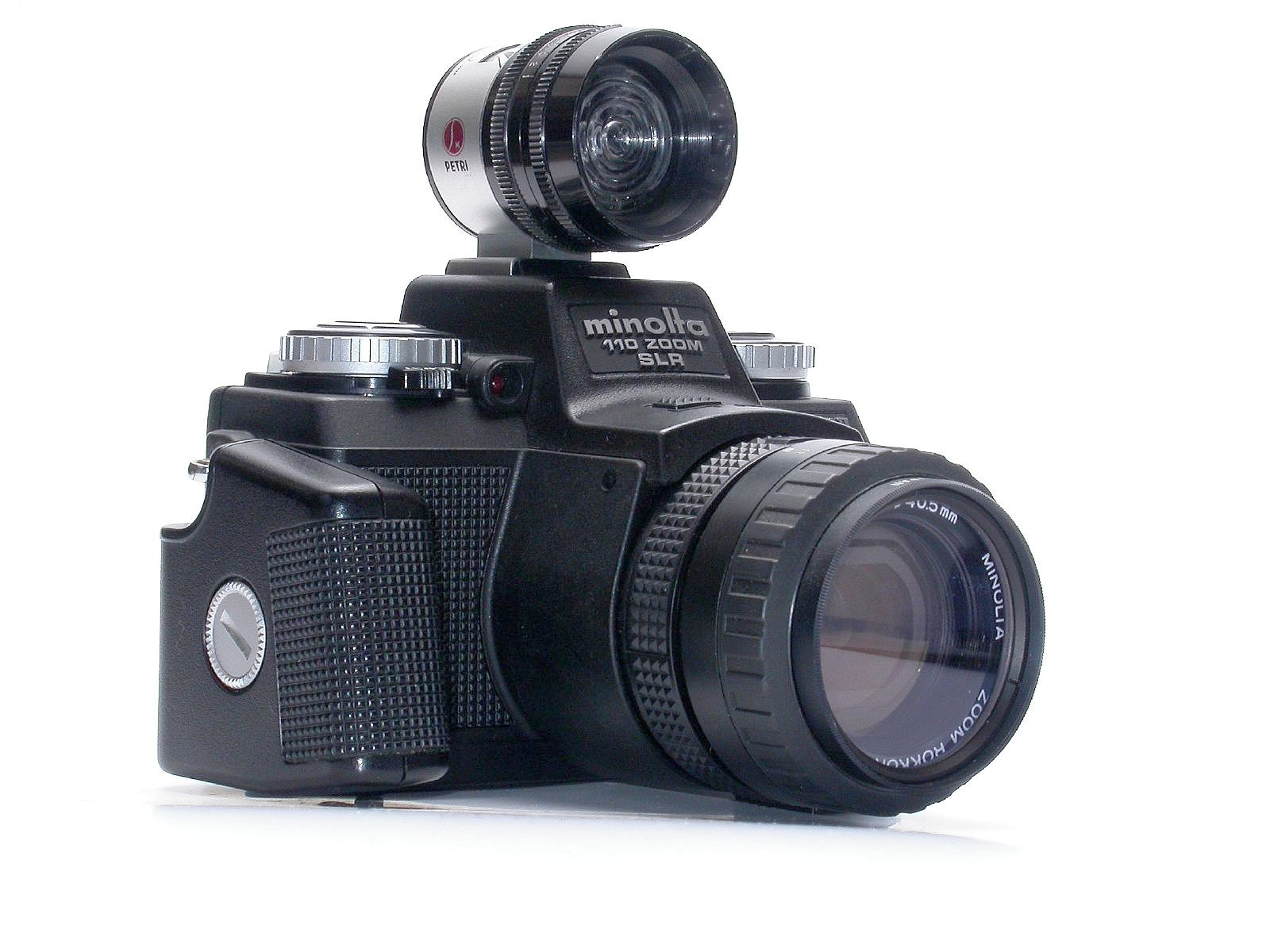
- Minolta 110 Mk II

Overview
- Type: 110 submini SLR

Lens
- Lens mount: Fixed 25-67 mm ƒ3.5 zoom lens

Focusing
- Focus: Manual focus

Exposure/metering
- Exposure: Aperture priority autoexposure

Flash
- Flash: Hot shoe only

The Minolta 110 Zoom SLR is a 110 format single-lens reflex (SLR) camera produced by Minolta of Japan between 1976 and 1979. It was the first SLR in 110 format. It has an unusual, flattened shape. Other 110 SLRs were shaped like SLRs in larger formats, but the 110 Zoom SLR took the flat format of the typical 110 pocket camera and added a larger lens and prism hump to it. 1979's replacement, the Minolta 110 Zoom SLR Mark II, has a more conventional shape.

The 110 Zoom SLR provides aperture priority autoexposure; fully manual exposure is not available. Light metering is with a CdS meter mounted on the front of the camera. An exposure compensation dial allows the photographer to compensate for unusual lighting situations; it also allows the use of film speeds other than the ISO 100 and 400 auto-selected by the cartridge tab, by applying the appropriate compensation factor.

The lens is a fixed 25–50 mm f/4.5-16 manual focus zoom with macro focusing down to 11 in (280 mm). This gives a field of view range approximately equivalent to a 50–100 mm zoom lens on a 35 mm format camera. There is a built-in, pop out lens shade. The filter thread diameter is 40.5 mm. Minolta sold UV, yellow and 1B filters.

Available shutter speeds are 1/1000 second through 10 seconds, with a 1/150 second X-sync speed and support for bulb exposure. There is no built-in flash, but a hot shoe on the top allows an external flash to be attached. A tripod socket is provided.

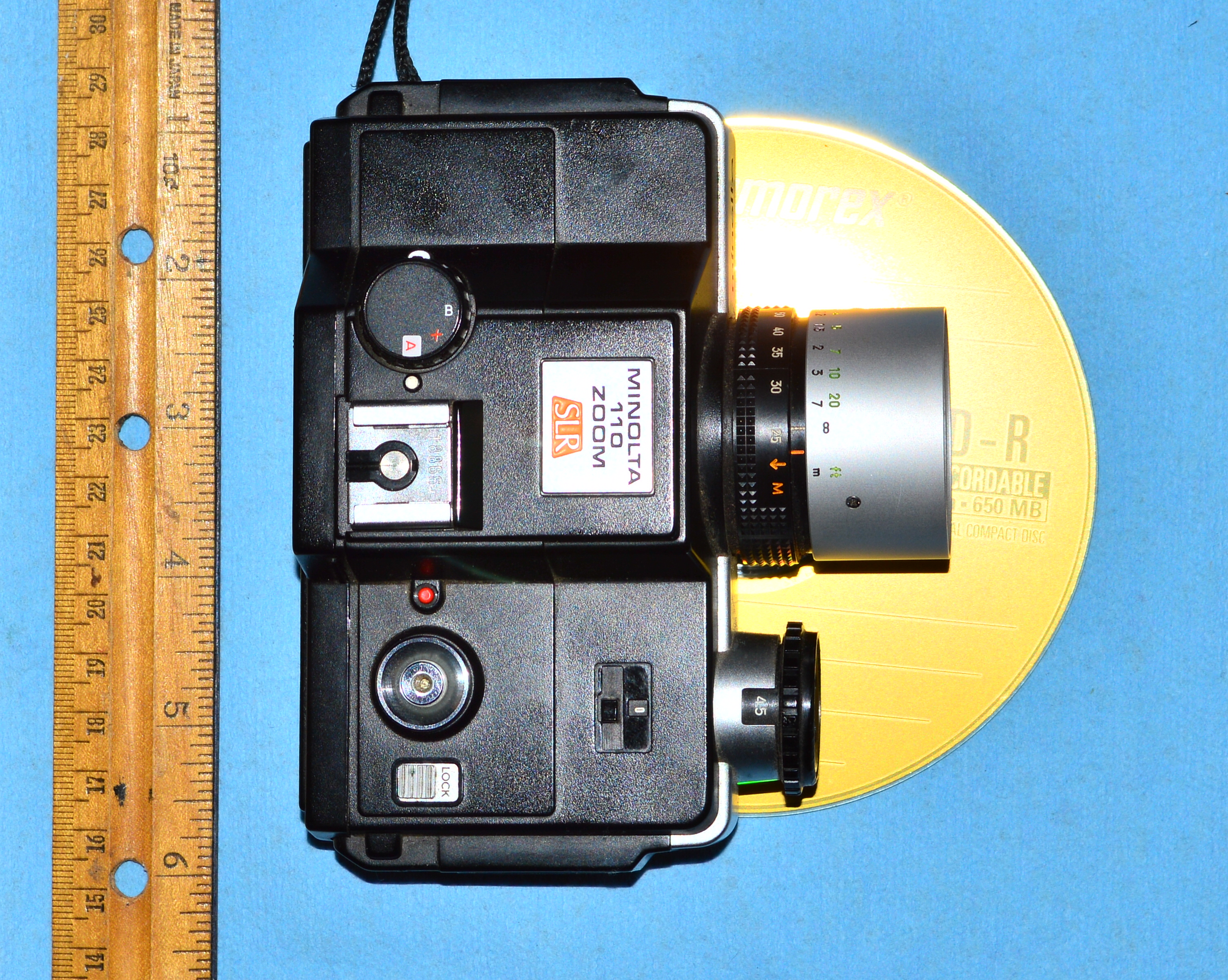
Minolta 110 Zoom SLR shown against a standard inch/centimeter ruler and a standard-sized 120 mm CD-R disk to illustrate its size.

== See also ==
- Pentax Auto 110
