= Meopta Mikroma =

Meopta Mikroma is an all metal 16mm subminiature camera made by Meopta in Czechoslovakia, after World War II.

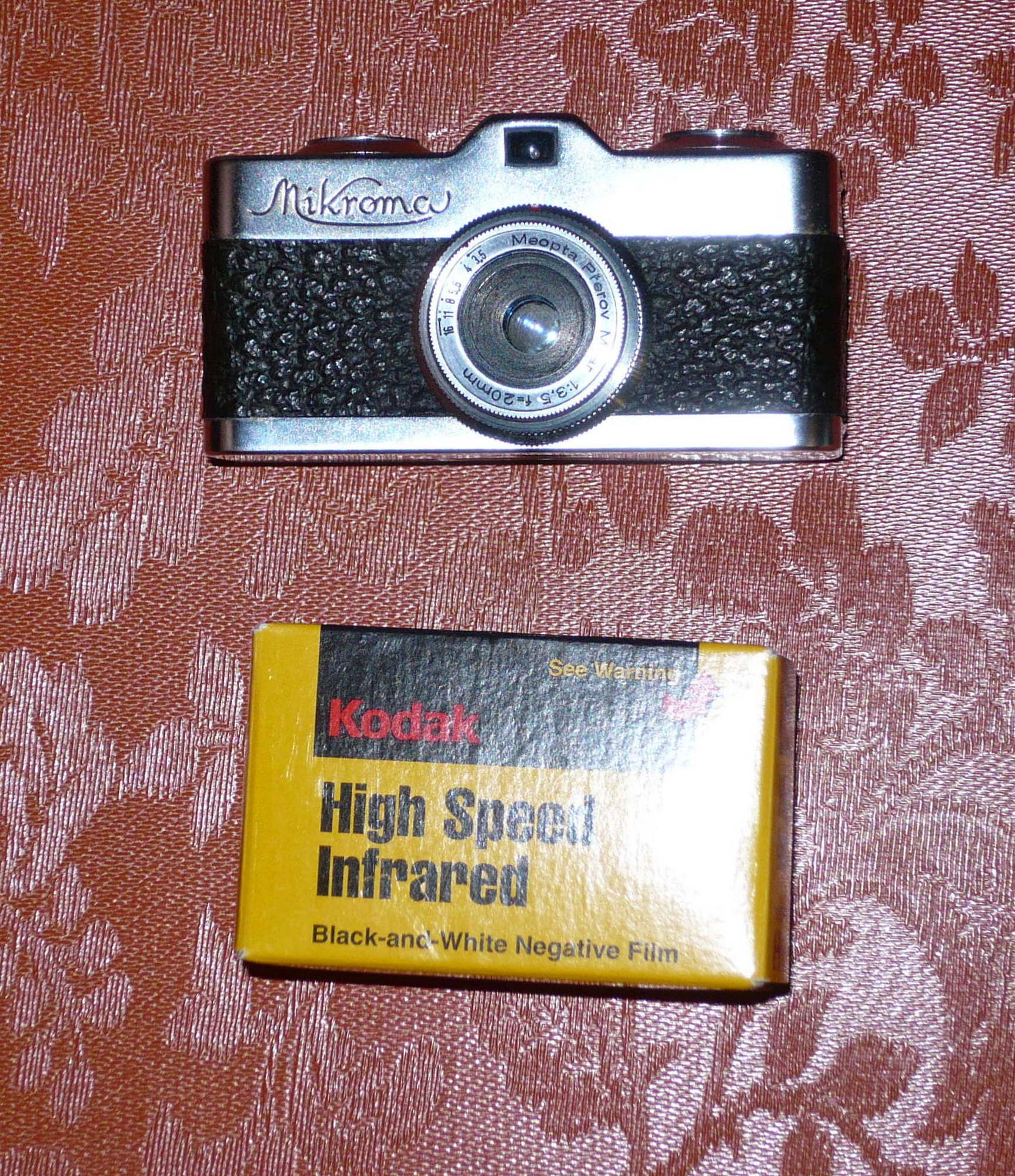
Meopta Mikroma 16mm subminiature camera

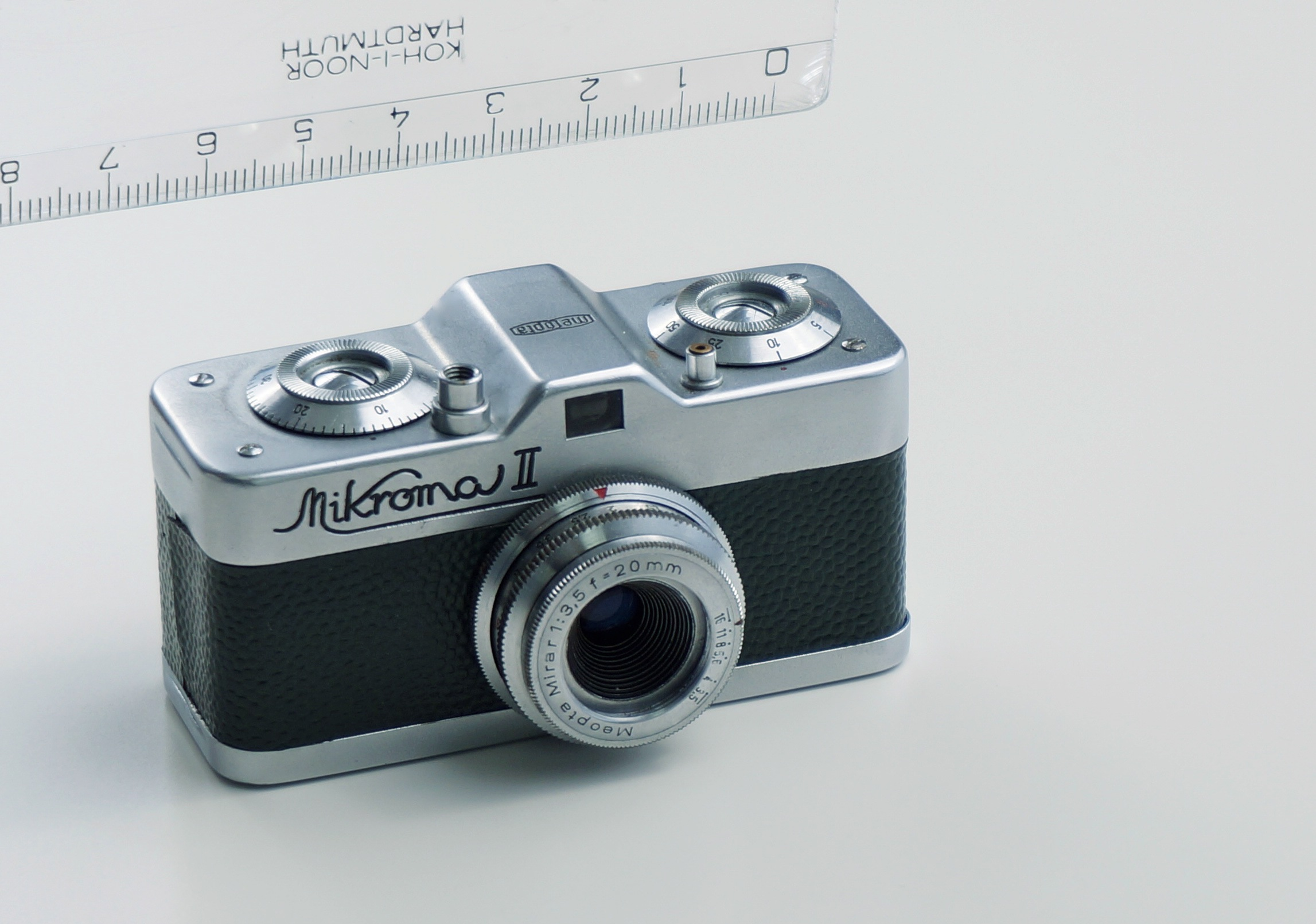
Meopta Mikroma II 16mm subminiature camera

== Features ==
- Dimension: 74mm x 35mm x 28mm
- Weight: 225g
- Lens: Meopta Mirar 20mm /3.5 triplet (Cooke style)
- Focusing dial (Meter) 0.5，0.7，1，1.2；1.3，1.5，1.7，2，2.5，3.5，50，10，infinity
- Aperture 3.5-16
- Counter: 1 to 50
- Mechanical shutter
- Mikroma B,25,50,100,200
- Mikroma II B,5,10,25,50,100,200,400
- Film: 16mm single perforated film
- Frame size 11.5 x14

== Accessories ==
- Copy stand
- Close up attachment lens 0.33-0.5m, 0.5-1m
- Filter set: ultraviolet, yellow, red, green, light green
- Supply side cassette and take up side cassette
- 16mm Meopta development tank
- Genuine leather case

== Pictures ==
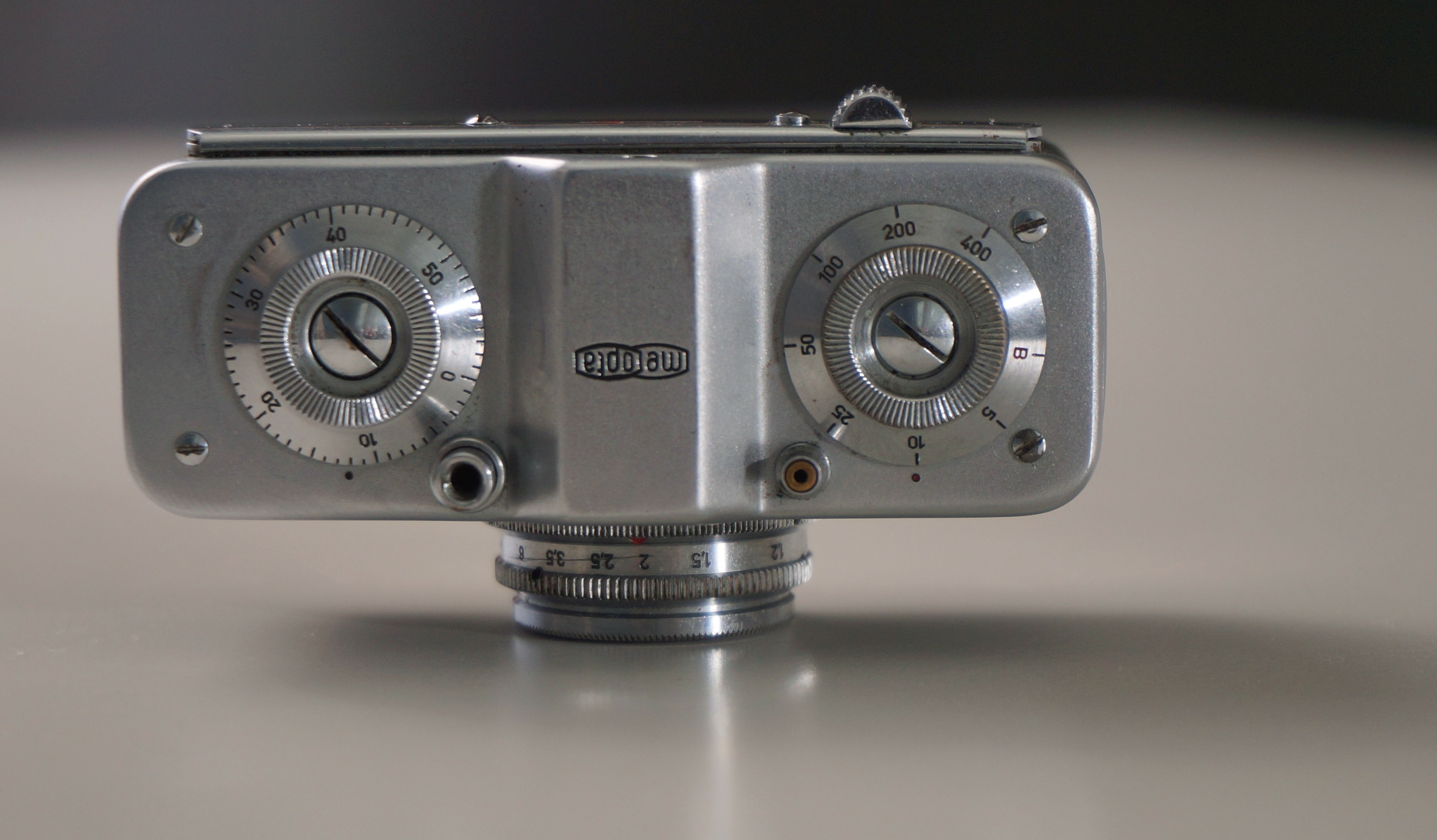
Mikroma II top view

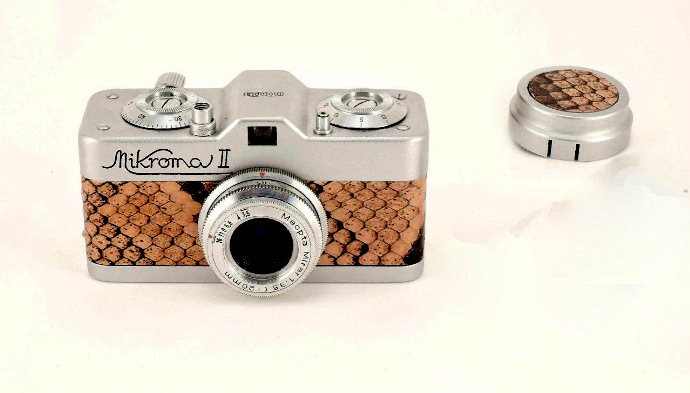
Snake skin Mikroma II

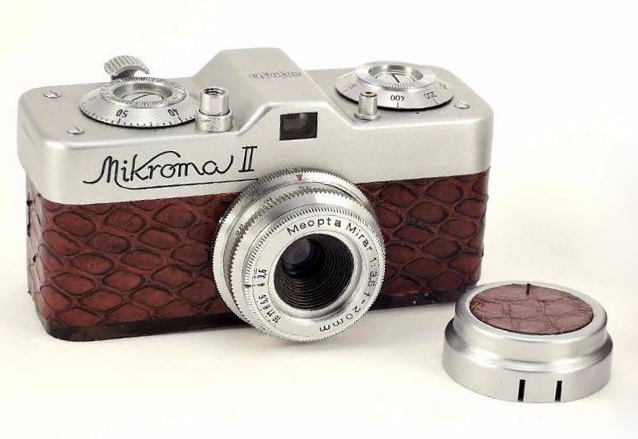
Light brown snake skin Mikroam II

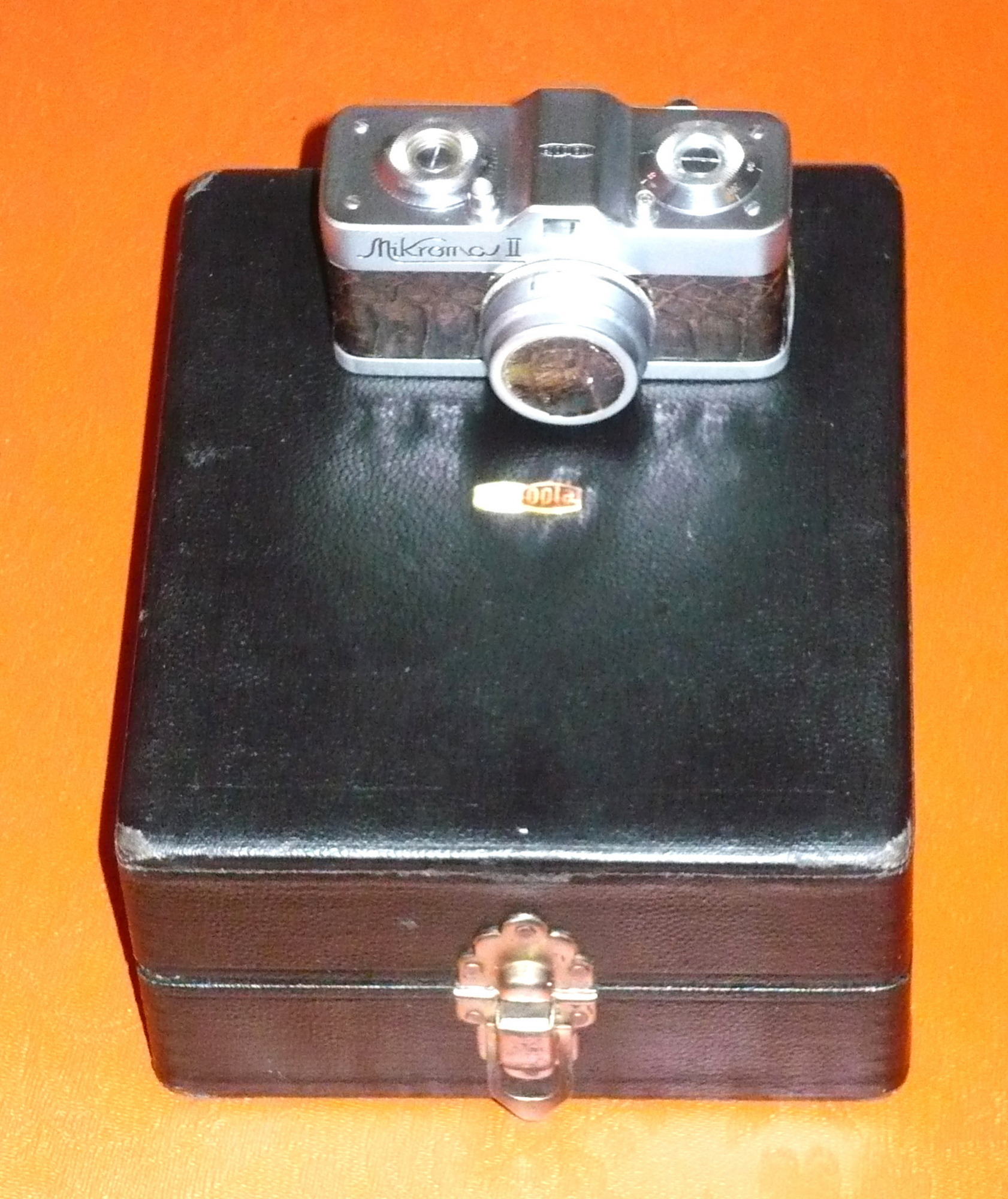
Dark brown snake skin Mikroma II deluxe wooden box

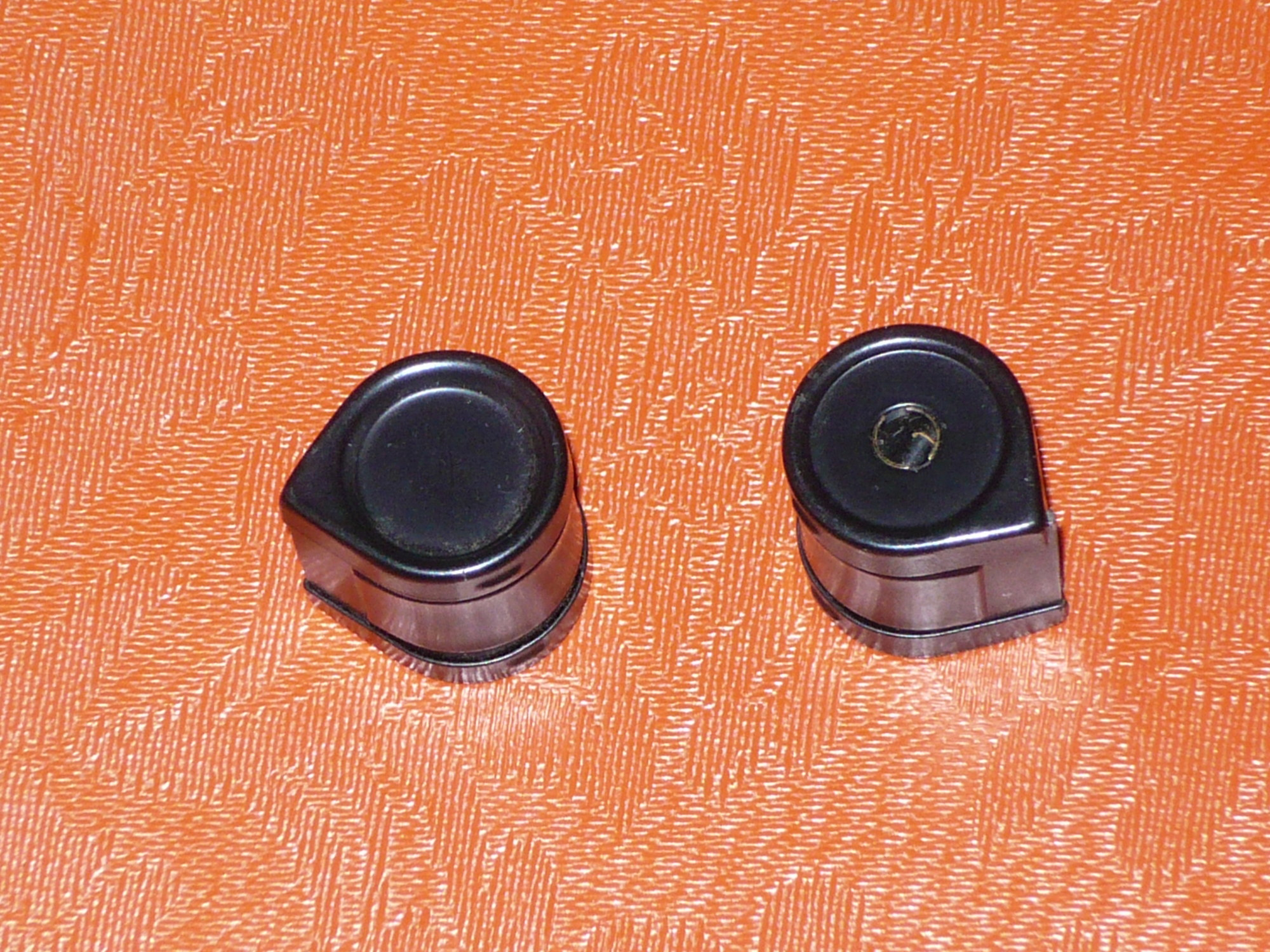
Mikroma cassette

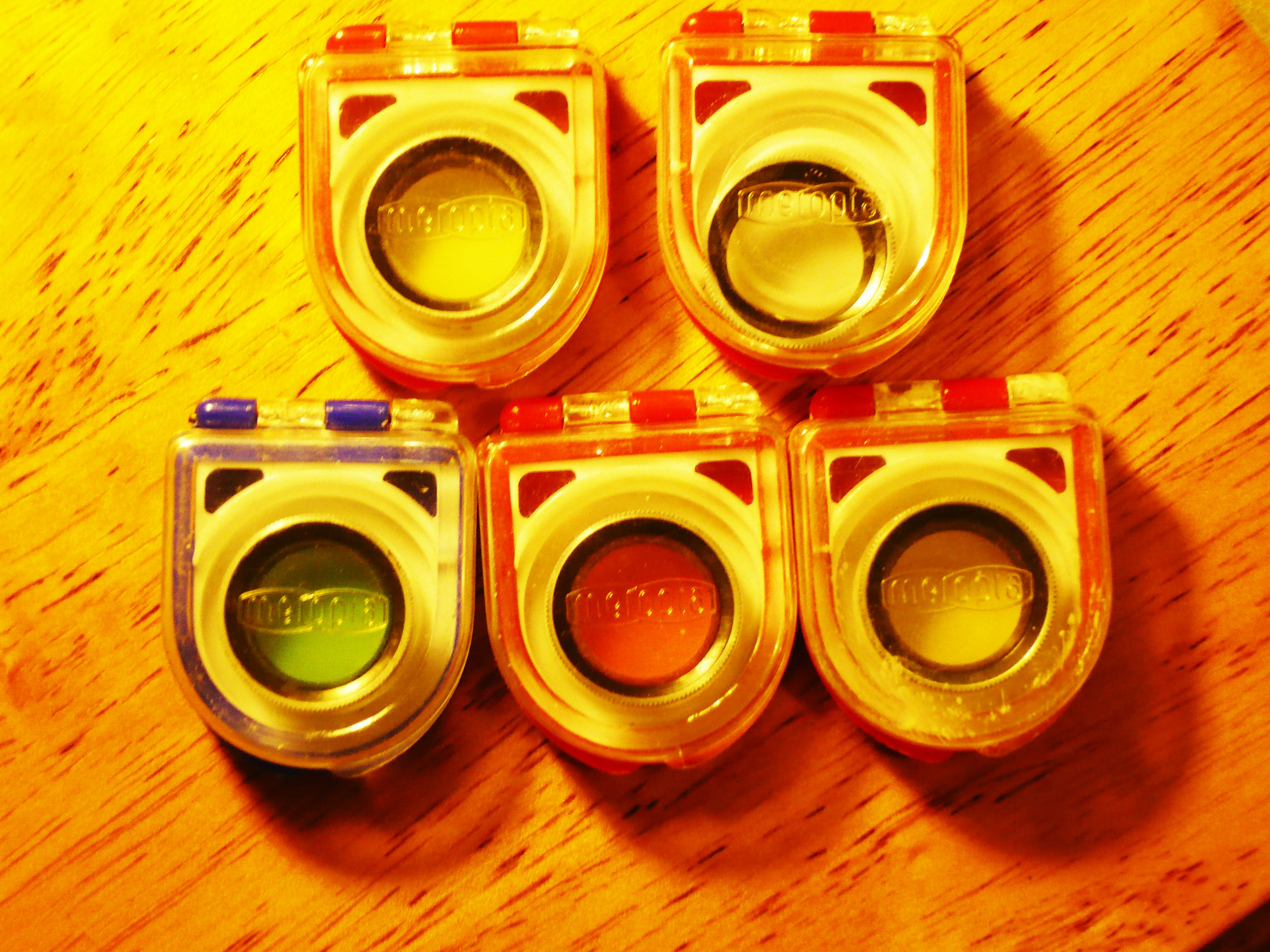
Mikroma close up lens and filters

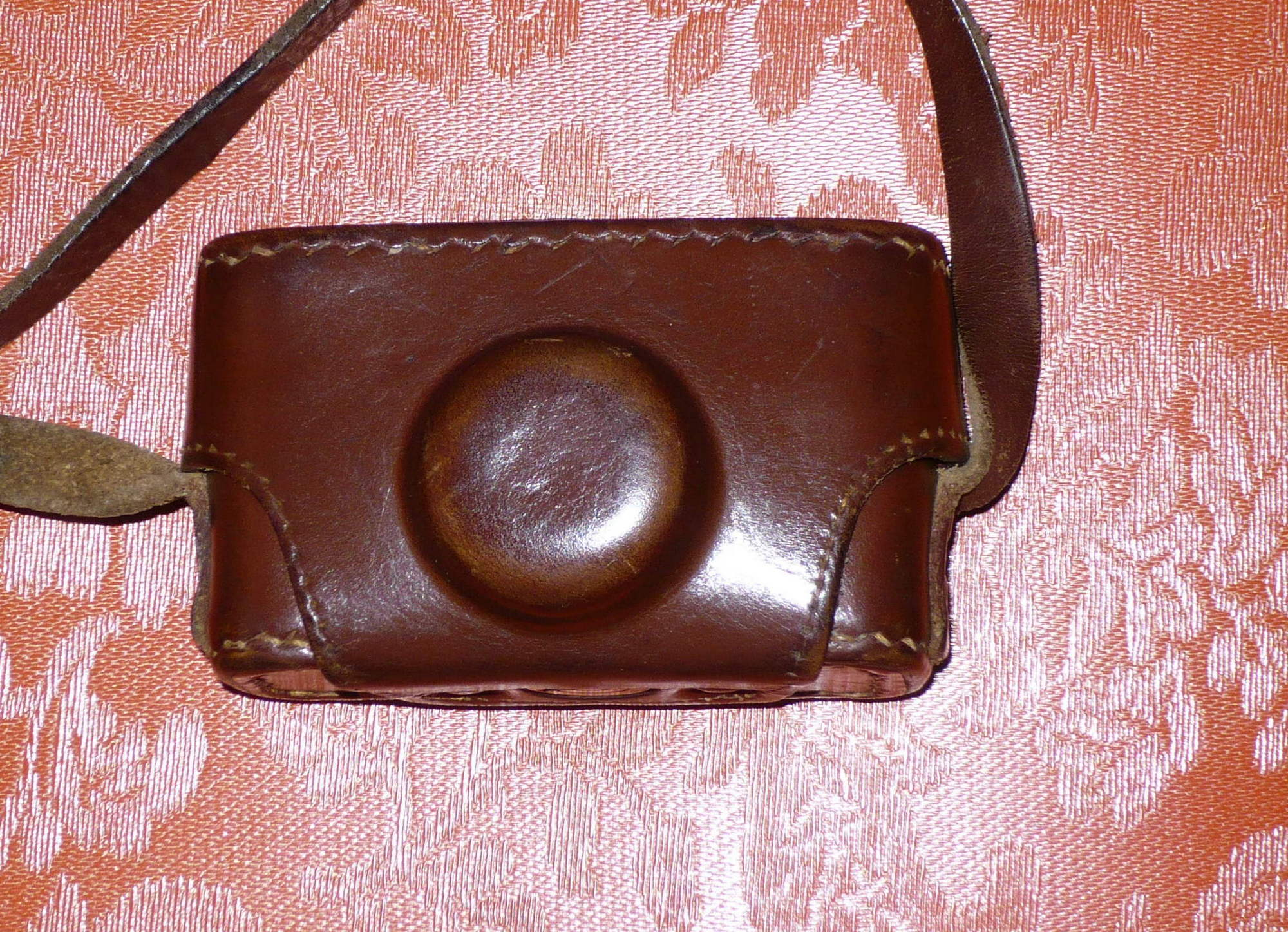
Leather case

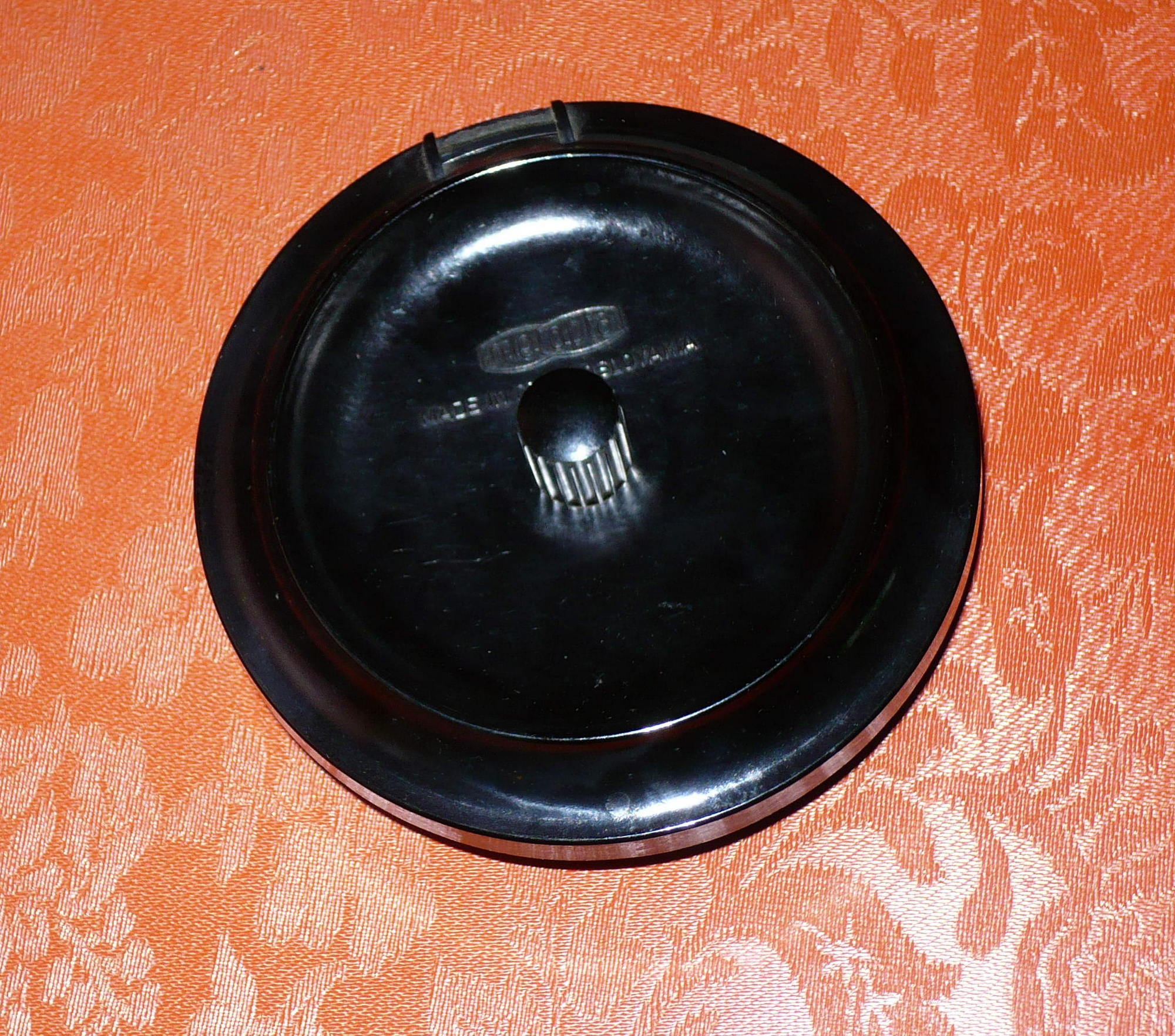
Meopta 16mm development tank
