= Gemflex =

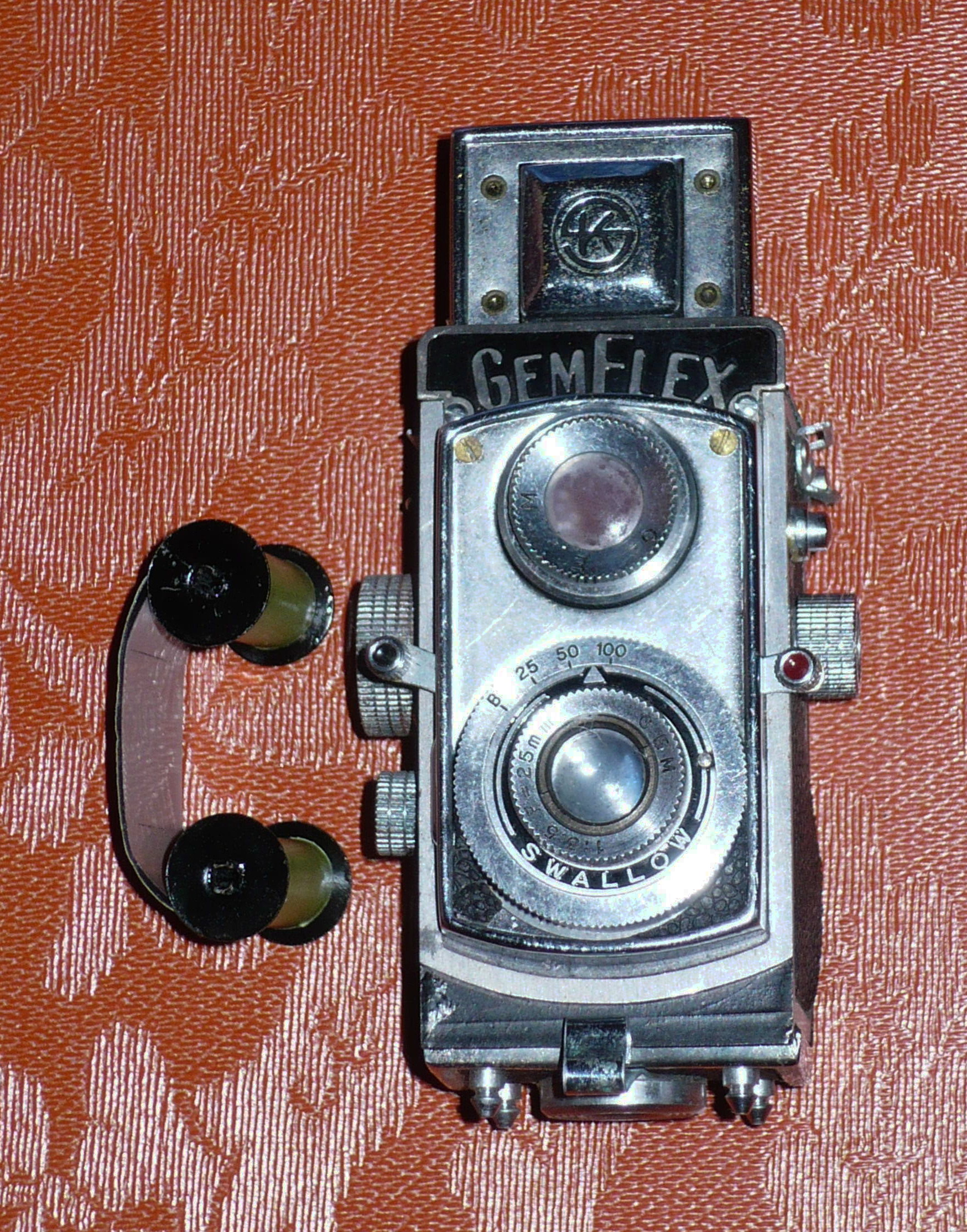
Gemflex twin lens reflex camera

Gemflex is a subminiature twin lens reflex camera made by Showa Optica Works (昭和光学精機) in occupied Japan in the 1950s.

Gemflex resembles the well known Rolleiflex 6x6cm twin lens reflex, but much smaller in size. The body of Gemflex is die-cast from shatter proof metal.

A tripod socket at bottom of the Gemflex allows attachment to tripod.

== Characteristics ==
Gemflex belongs to HIT camera class, using 17.5mm paper backed roll film (known as HIT film). Frame format is 14x14mm square image, ten frames per roll.

Dimension – 72x40x42mm.

Fixed focus GEM lens, focal length = 25mm, F3.5.

Viewfinder with pop up hood, 14x14mm ground glass screen, viewfinder lens 25mm.

Swallow mechanical shutter: B, 1/25,1/50 and 1/100.

Accessory: genuine leather case.

== Depth of Field ==
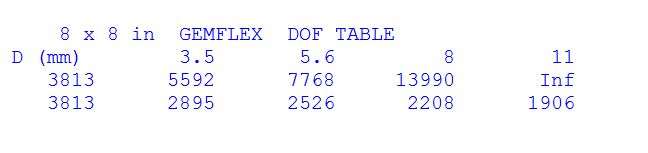

== Gallery ==
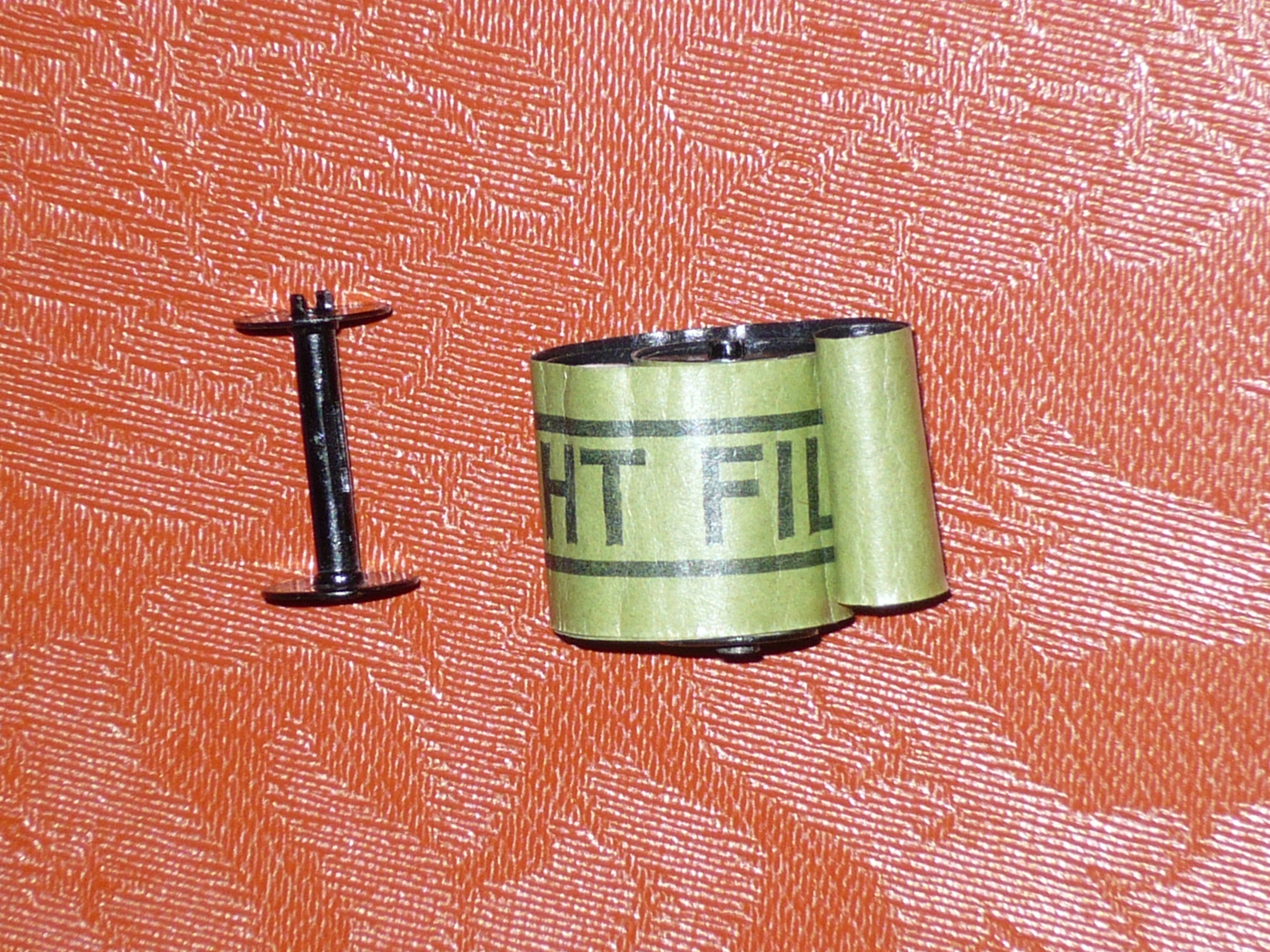
17.5mm HIT camera roll film

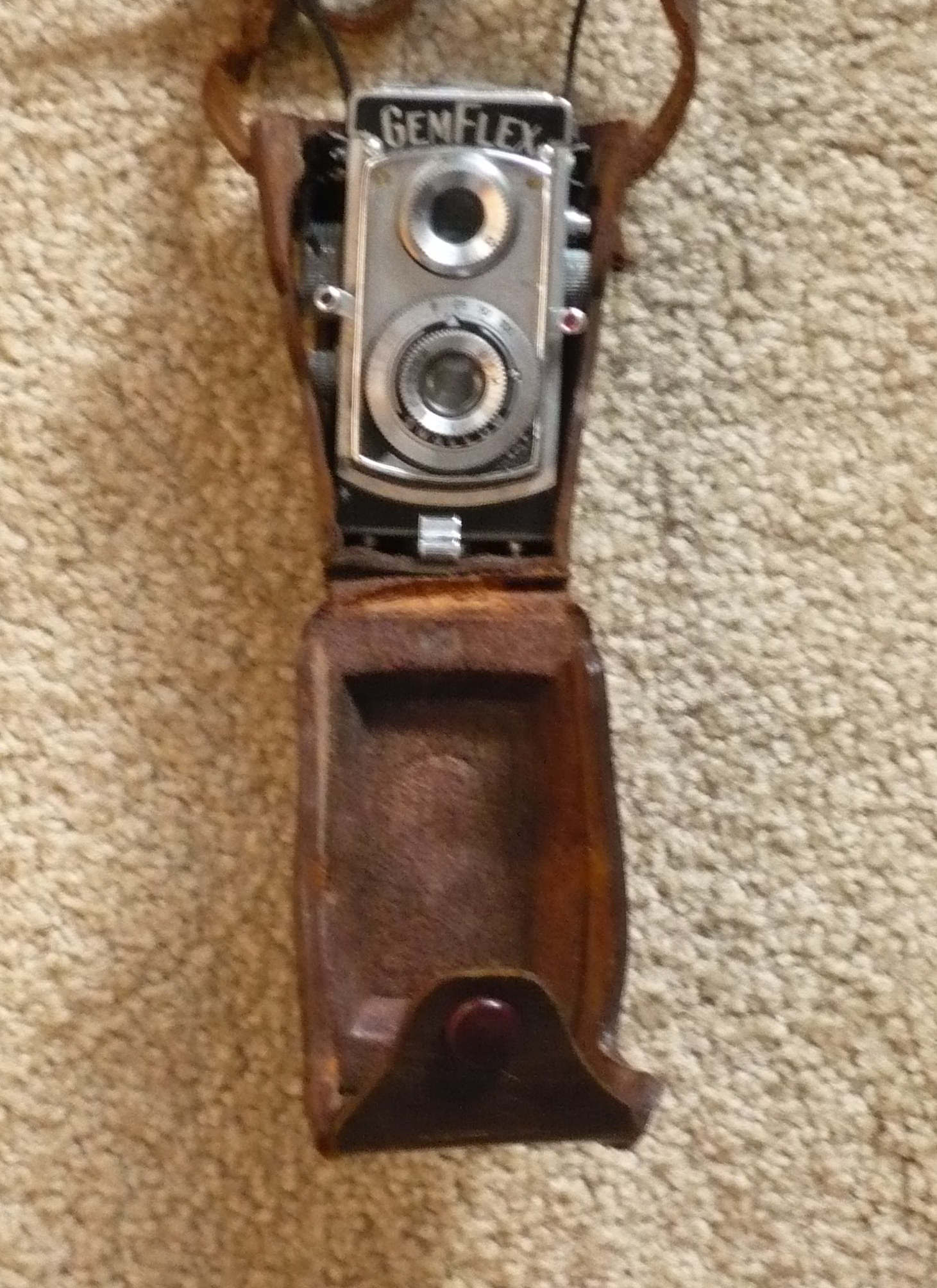
Gemflex with brown leather case

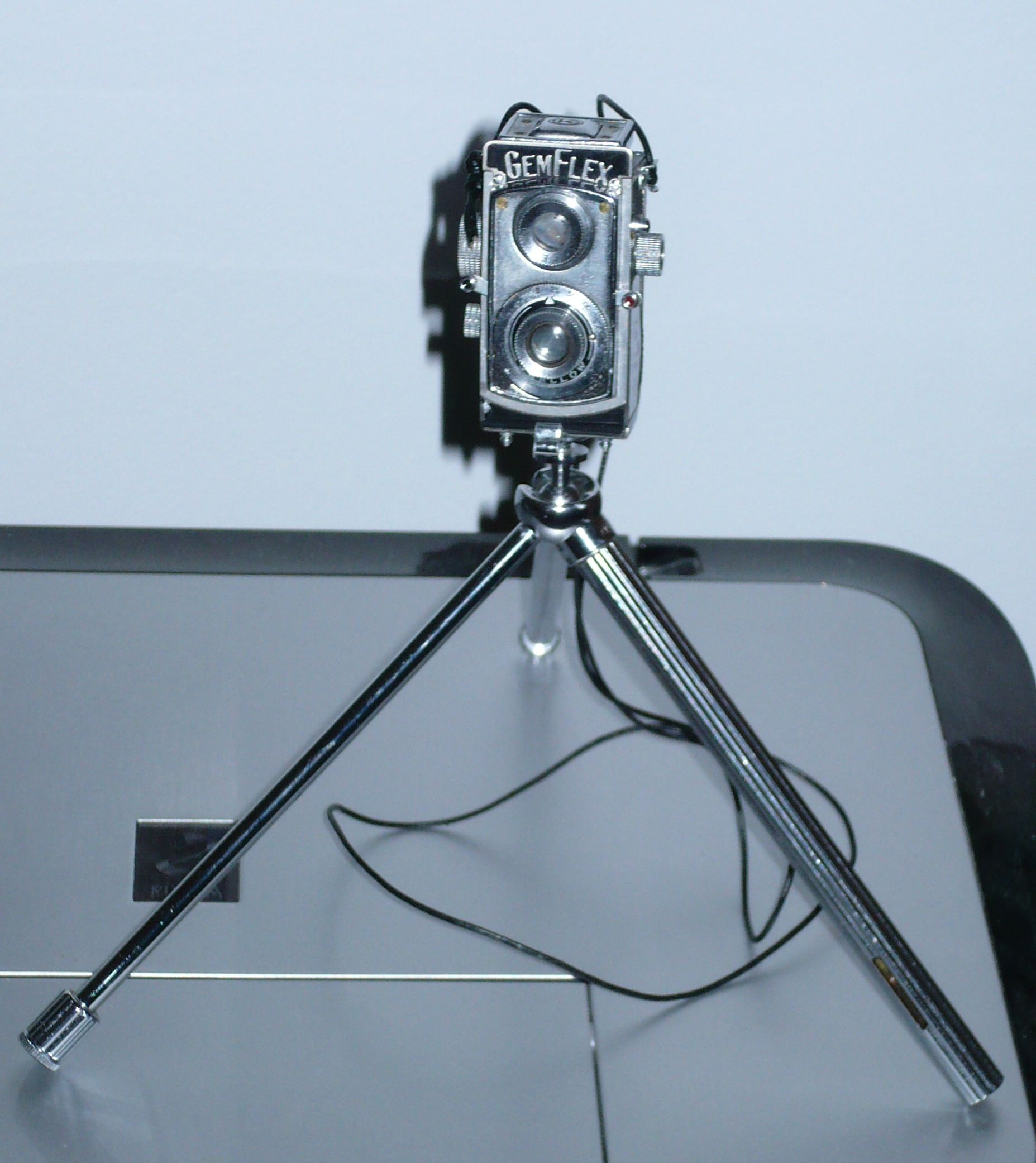
Gemflex on mini tripod
