= TONE camera =

Camera

TONE camera was a sophisticated Hit-type camera using 17.5 mm paper backed film, introduced by Toyo Kobi Optical Company in occupied Japan in 1948.

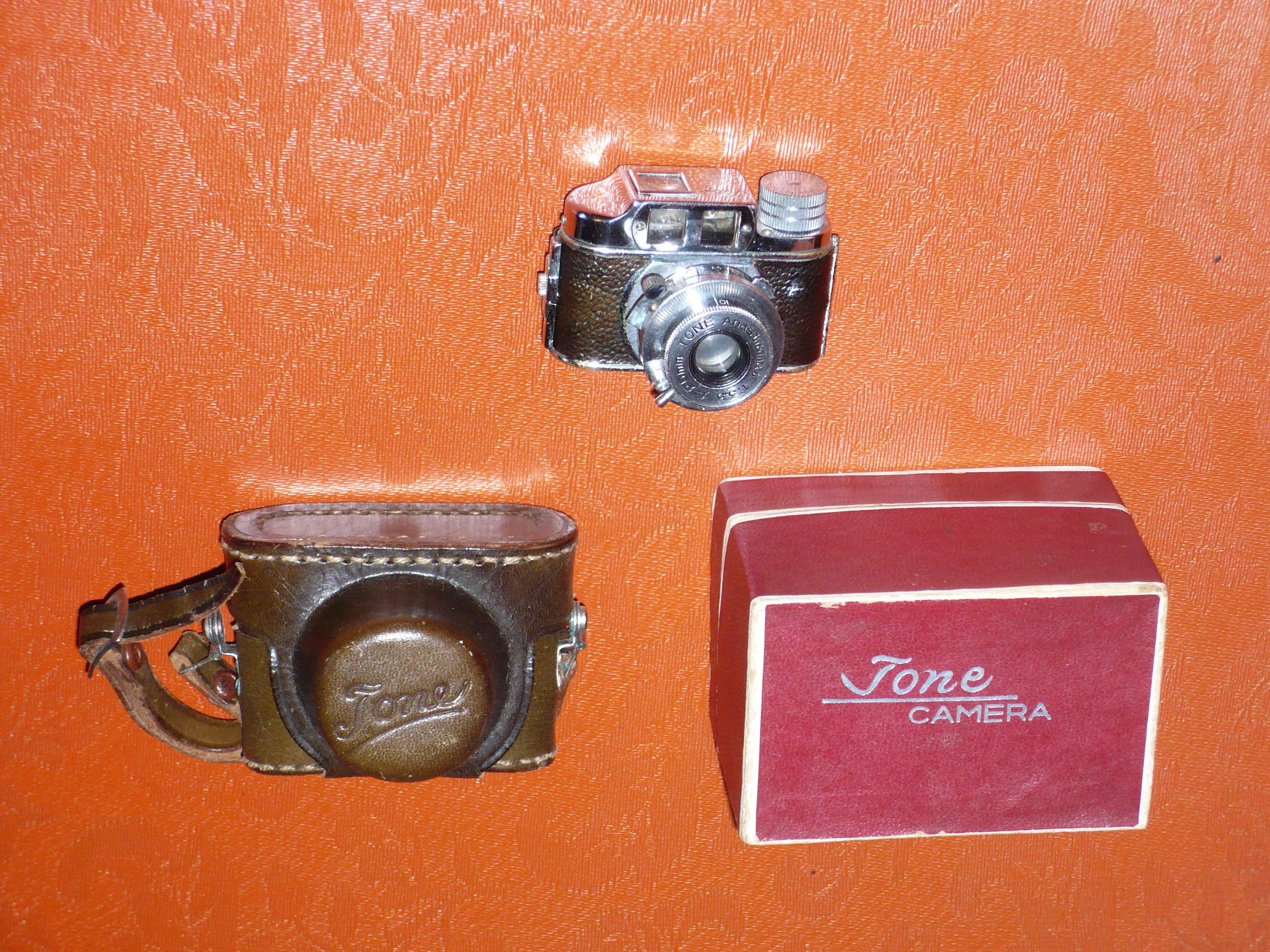
TONE camera with leather case

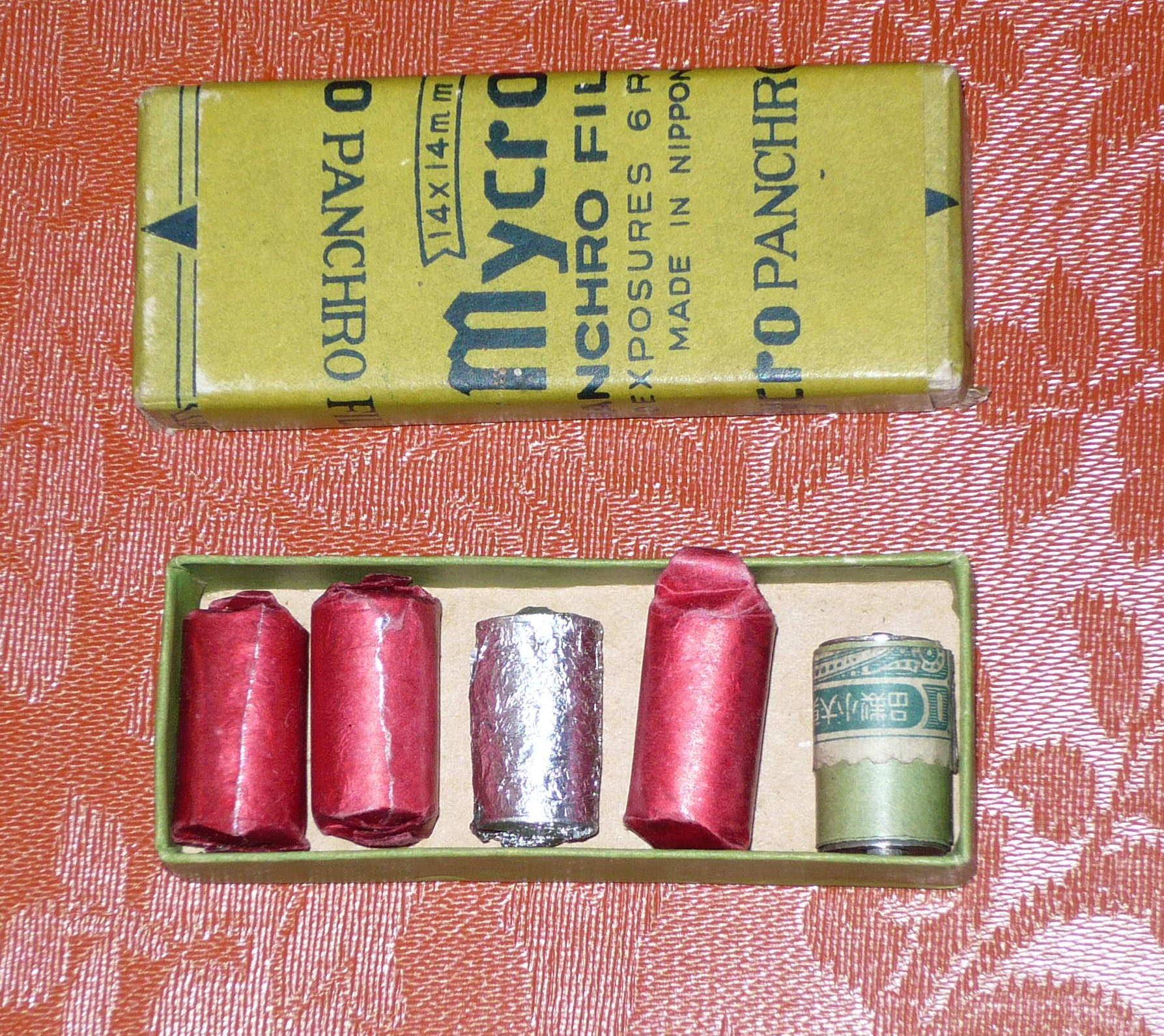
Paper backed 17.5 mm roll film

Unlike other simple Hit-type cameras with a fixed-focus lens and single shutter speed, the TONE camera is a full function subminiature camera with focusing lens, variable aperture and variable shutter speed

== Features ==
- Both an eye-level viewfinder and a waist level viewfinder,
- Lens: TONE Anastigmat 1:3.5 f=25 mm
- Focusing dial: 3 ft, 10 ft, infinity
- Close focusing: about 2 feet
- Aperture: ƒ/3.5, ƒ/4.5, ƒ/8, ƒ/11
- Shutter: 1/25 s, 1/50 s, 1/100 s, bulb

== Film ==
HIT-type 17.5 mm paper backed roll film, with a metal spool, each roll of film can be used to make 10 exposures of 14x14 mm pictures. 17.5 mm film was made from 35 mm film by cutting it in the middle. One box of HIT film contains six rolls of 17.5 mm film wrapped in thin aluminium foil.

== Depth of field table ==
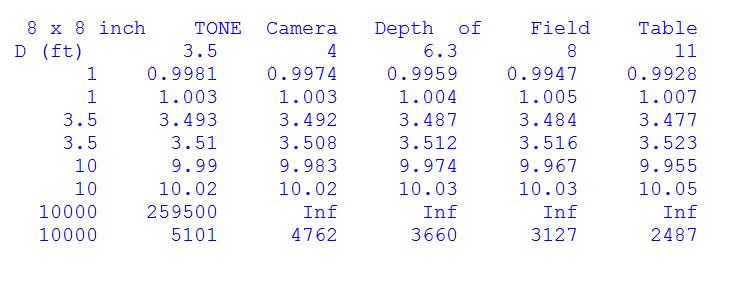
TONE camera depth of field table
