= Pentax 645 =

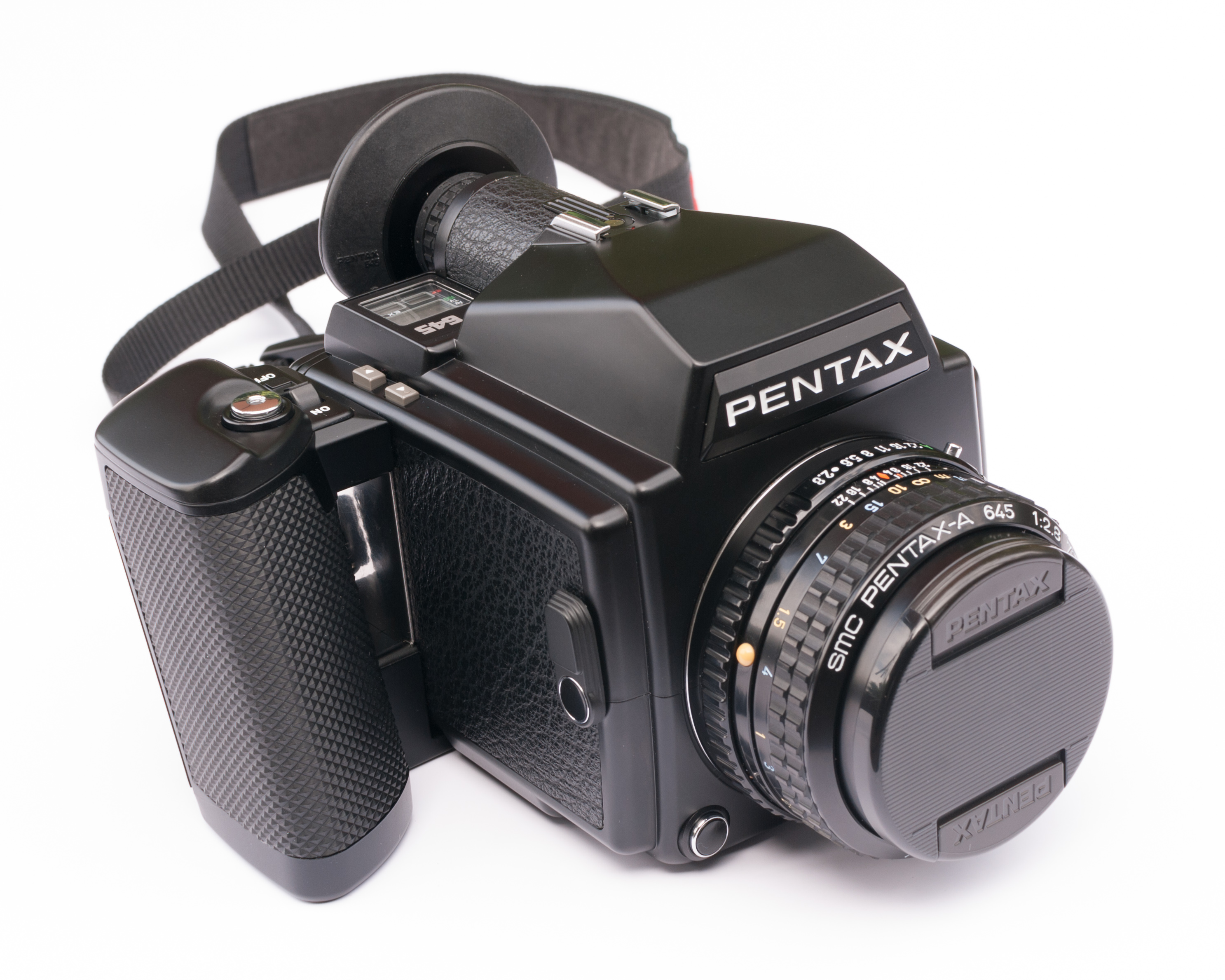
- Pentax 645 with 75 mm normal lens

Overview
- Maker: Pentax
- Type: Single-lens reflex camera

Lens
- Lens mount: Pentax 645 A mount (70.87 mm)

Sensor/medium
- Film speed: ISO 6-6400 in 1/3 stop increments
- Recording medium: medium format film

Focusing
- Focus: manual (auto on 645N)

Exposure/metering
- Exposure: automatic, manual
- Exposure metering: TTL center-weighted

Flash
- Flash: hot shoe, socket, X-sync

Shutter
- Shutter: vertical cloth focal plane
- Shutter speeds: 15 s - 1/1000 s, Bulb

Viewfinder
- Viewfinder: fixed eye-level pentaprism

General
- Battery: 6 AA
- Weight: 46.2 oz (1,310 g)
- Made in: Japan

The Pentax 645 is a medium format single-lens reflex system camera manufactured by Pentax. It was introduced in 1984, along with a complementary line of lenses. It captures images nominally 6 cm × 4.5 cm on 120, 220, and 70 mm film, though the actual size of the images is 56 mm × 41.5 mm.

== Models ==
=== 645 ===
The 645 is the original model introduced in 1984. It has a built-in 1.5 frames per second motor drive, center-weighted TTL metering, multiple automatic exposure modes, and a small LCD screen on the top plate which indicates mode, exposure compensation, and exposure count. Unlike comparable medium-format cameras, the 645 does not have an interchangeable back system. Instead, the film is loaded into holders, which are then inserted into the rear of the camera. The holders cannot be removed until an entire roll is exposed. The crop factor vs. a 35 mm camera is .62, The actual film image is 2.7 times larger than that of standard double format 35mm film.

=== 645N ===
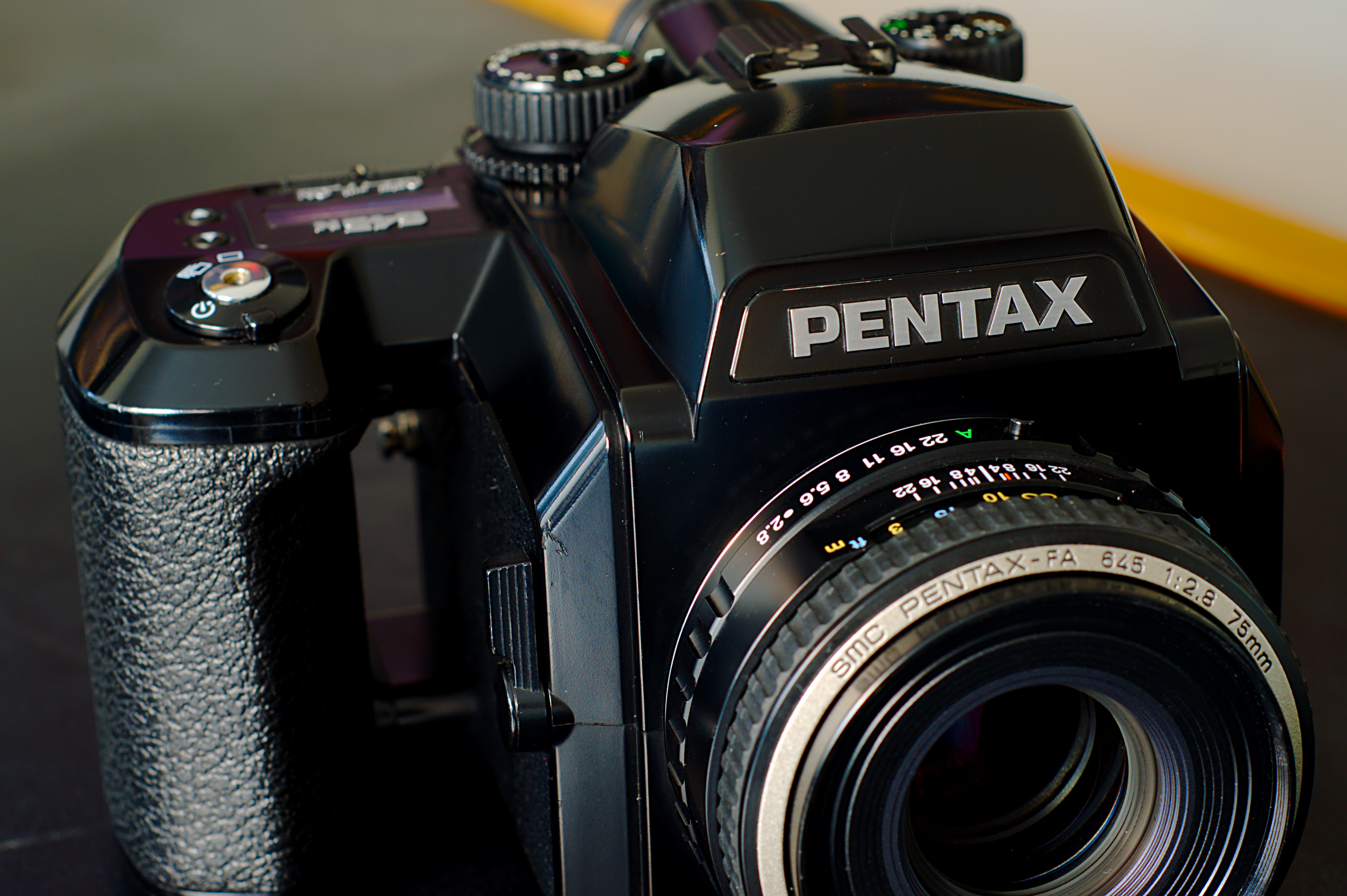
Pentax 645N with 75 mm lens

In 1997, a significantly redesigned model was introduced. The 645N incorporated an auto-focus system, and most of the 645 lenses were upgraded to match. The new model also featured matrix metering, film-edge data imprinting, and a self-timer. The imprinted data on the edge of every image includes the frame number, exposure mode, shutter speed, aperture, exposure compensation value, metering mode, and lens focal length. The controls and LCD on the top plate were significantly changed, and the motor drive was increased to 2 frames per second.

=== 645NII ===
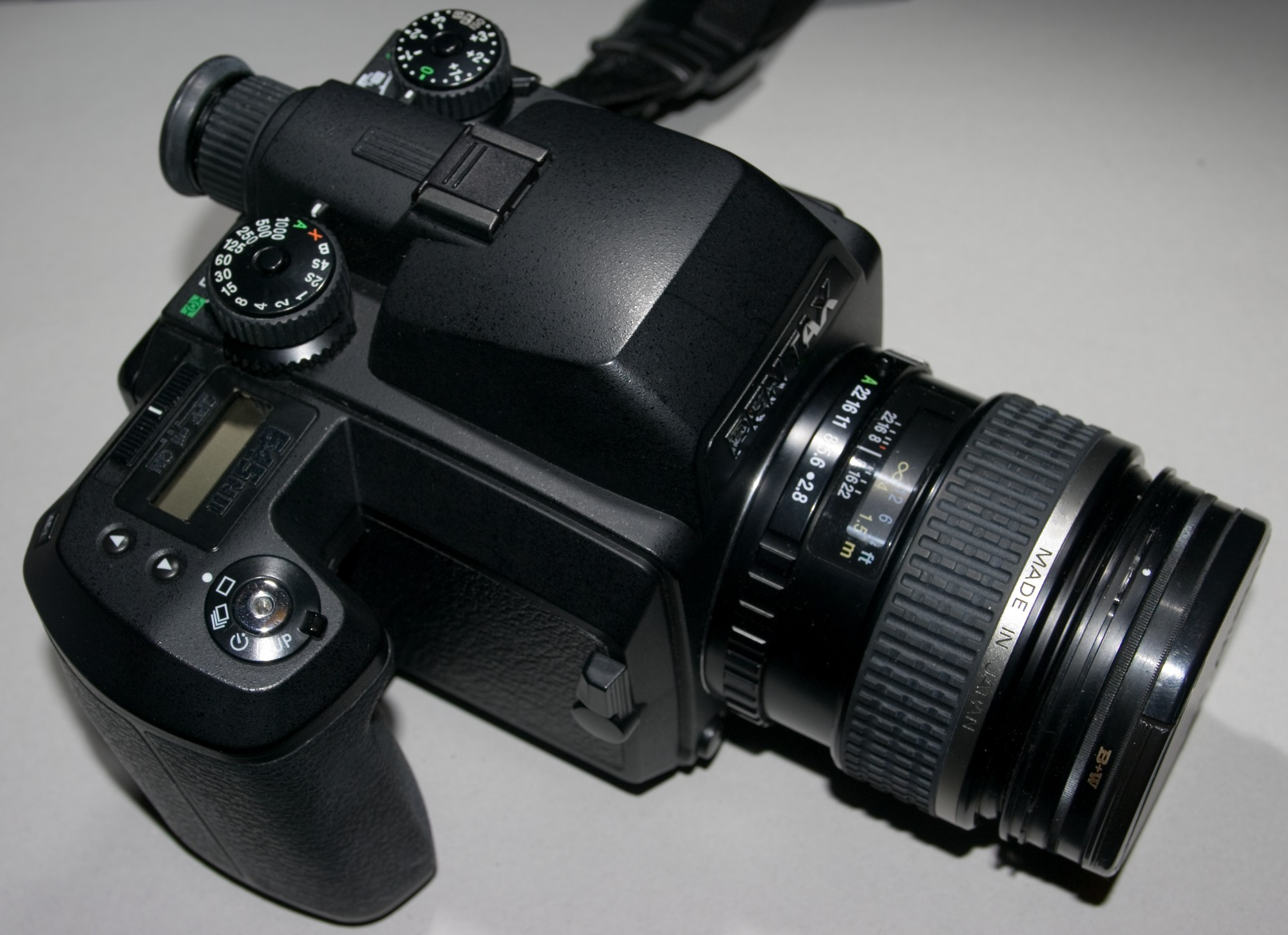
Pentax 645NII with 45 mm lens

The 645NII was introduced in 2001. The main improvement was the addition of mirror lock-up. The 645NII provides 10 Pentax Functions [PF] to set the camera according to the user's preferences. [PF 0] Imprinting the character (capital letters A - G). If the imprinting is enabled, a capital letter can be imprinted on the negative. [PF 1] Setting the shutter speed step. For use with the Shutter-Priority AE or Metered Manual Mode set, the shutter speed step can be set to either 0.5 or 1 EV step. [PF 2] Setting the metering timer. The metering will stay on for 10 seconds but can be changed to 20 or 30 seconds. [PF 3] Setting the auto-bracketing sequence. You can set the sequence of the auto-bracketing exposures. [PF 4] Setting the self-timer delay time. The self-timer delay time can be set to 12 sec. or 2 sec. [PF 5] Setting the exposure compensation step. Set the exposure compensation step 1/3EV or 1/2EV step. [PF 6] Enabling/disabling the program line for shifting. The program line of Programmed AE Mode can be shifted according to your shooting preferences. [PF 7] Setting the frame counter indication. The frame counter can be set to a count-up indication or to a count-down indication. [PF 8] Enabling/disabling the display of the number of films taken and frame counter in the viewfinder. [PF9] Changing the number of frames taken. Changes the number of recordable frames when a 120 film or 220 film is used.

pdf of Pentax 645NII manual.

=== 645D ===
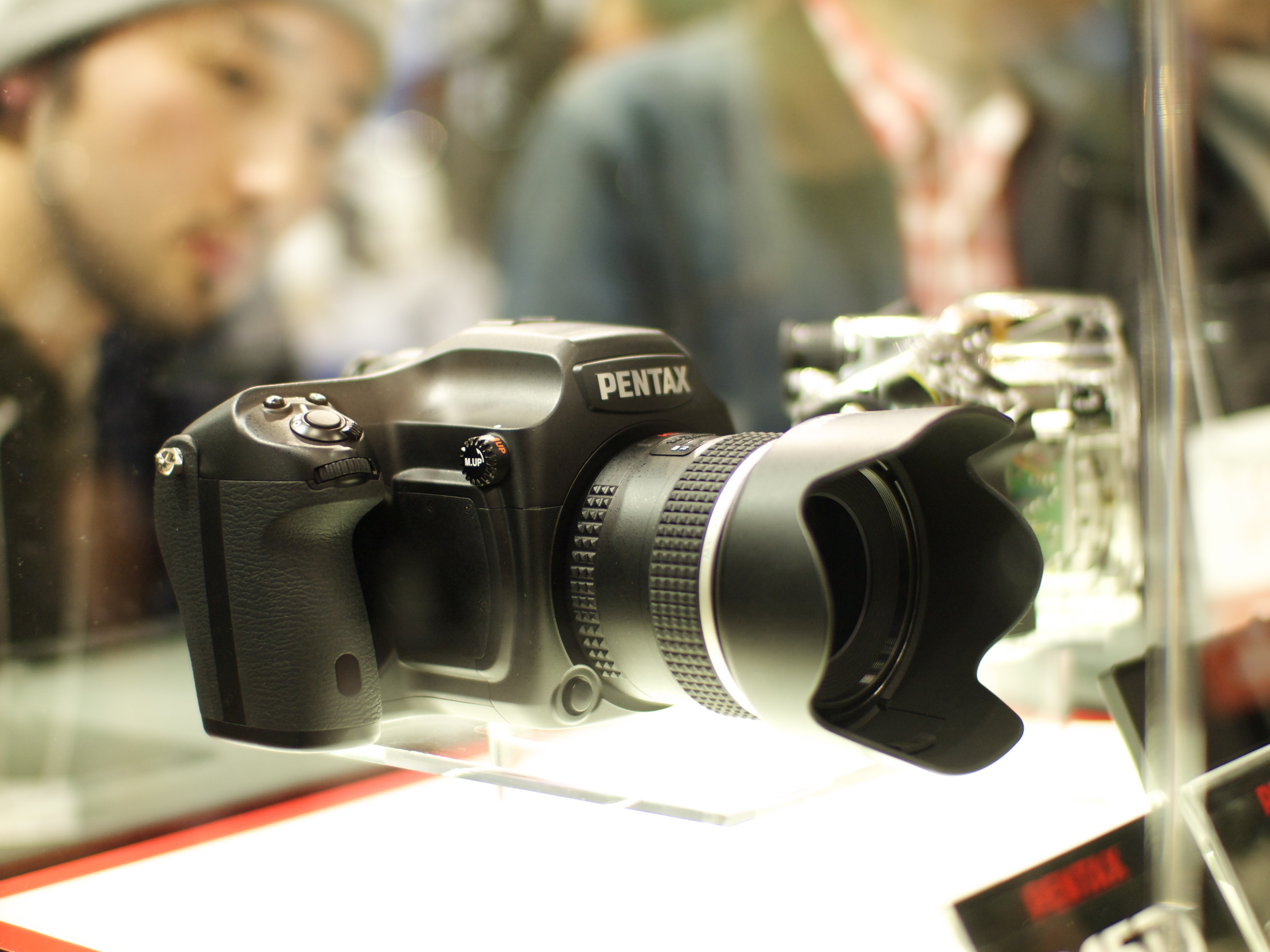
"Pentax 645D" camera with "smc PENTAX-DFA 645 55 mm F2.8 AL" lens

The Pentax 645D is a digital single-lens reflex camera introduced in 2010. It is approximately the same size and shape as the earlier film models, and the lens mount accepts older manual and auto-focus lenses. It features a 40 megapixel CCD sensor manufactured by Kodak. The 7264×5440 pixel sensor measures 44 mm × 33 mm, which is less than 63% the size of a 6×4.5 cm film image but over 168% of a full-frame DSLR. Unlike other medium-format DSLRs, which accept digital camera backs of different resolutions or even manufacturers, the 645D has a fixed-back design similar to smaller full-frame and APS-C DSLRs. The fixed back allows the 645D to be fully weather-sealed. The crop factor vs. a 35 mm camera is 0.79.

=== 645Z ===
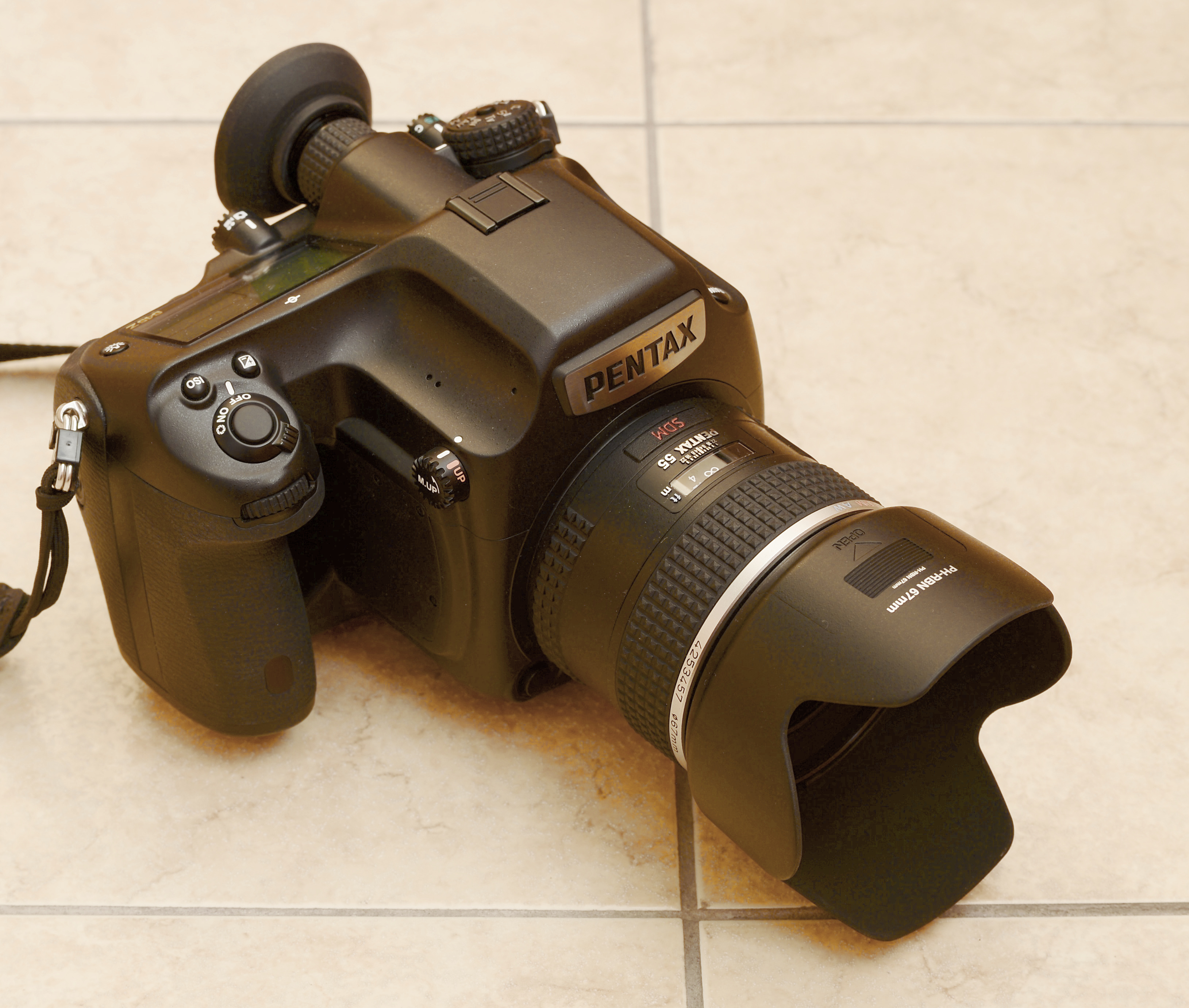
"Pentax 645Z" camera with lens

On the 5th of February 2014 Ricoh announced they would exhibit a new model Pentax medium format digital at the CP+ 2014 Camera and Photo Imaging Show, tentatively titled the "645D 2014". Features announced include a "latest, super-high-resolution CMOS image sensor" and a "tilt-type LCD monitor". The camera was expected to be reaching market in Spring 2014. In April 2014 the camera was announced as Pentax 645Z. It was sold out after launch, as demand (1500 orders as of June 2014) exceeded supply (400 cameras per month) because of its relatively low price ($10,000) compared to other medium size cameras ($30,000). The Pentax 645Z uses a 51.4 megapixel CMOS sensor and a 27-point autofocus system with two SD card slots in a weather sealed body.

== Lenses ==
The "A" series manual focus lenses were released with the original 645, followed by the auto-focusing "FA" series for the 645N, and the "DFA" series for the 645D. The acronym "smc" stands for super multi-coated, a feature long found on higher-grade Pentax lens. "IF" indicates that the lenses are of an internal focusing design. Pentax 67 lenses can be used on the 645 series with an adapter. The Pentax 645 lens mount has a flange focal distance of 70.87mm.

- smc PENTAX-D FA 645 25 mm F4.0 AL SDM AW [IF] (2011)
- smc PENTAX-DA 645 25 mm F4.0 AL SDM AW [IF] (2012-current)
- smc PENTAX-A 645 35 mm F3.5
- smc PENTAX-FA 645 35 mm F3.5 AL [IF]
- HD Pentax-D FA 645 35mm F3.5 AL (IF) (current)
- smc PENTAX-A 645 45 mm F2.8
- smc PENTAX-FA 645 45 mm F2.8 (current)
- smc PENTAX-A 645 55 mm F2.8
- smc PENTAX-D FA 645 55 mm F2.8 AL SDM AW [IF] (2010-current)
- smc PENTAX 645 LS 75 mm F2.8 - leaf shutter
- smc PENTAX-A 645 75 mm F2.8
- smc PENTAX-FA 645 75 mm F2.8 (current)
- HD PENTAX-D FA 645 Macro 90 mm F2.8 ED AW SR (current)
- smc PENTAX-A 645 Macro 120 mm F4.0
- smc PENTAX-FA 645 Macro 120 mm F4.0 (current)
- smc PENTAX 645 LS 135 mm F4.0 - leaf shutter
- smc PENTAX-A 645 150 mm F3.5
- smc PENTAX-FA 645 150 mm F2.8 [IF] (current)
- smc PENTAX-A 645 200 mm F4.0
- smc PENTAX-FA 645 200 mm F4.0 ED (current)
- smc PENTAX-A★ 645 300 mm F4.0 ED [IF] (current)
- smc PENTAX-FA 645 300 mm F5.6 ED [IF] (current)
- smc PENTAX-FA★ 645 300 mm F4.0 ED [IF] (current)
- smc PENTAX-FA 645 400 mm F5.6 ED [IF] (current)
- smc PENTAX-A★ 645 600 mm F5.6 ED [IF] (current)
- HD PENTAX-DA 645 28-45 mm F4.5 ED AW SR (current)
- smc PENTAX-FA 645 Zoom 33–55 mm F4.5 AL (current)
- smc PENTAX-A 645 Zoom 45–85 mm F4.5
- smc PENTAX-FA 645 Zoom 45–85 mm F4.5 (current)
- smc PENTAX-FA 645 Zoom 55–110 mm F5.6 (current)
- smc PENTAX-A 645 Zoom 80–160 mm F4.5
- smc PENTAX-FA 645 Zoom 80–160 mm F4.5 (current)
- smc PENTAX-FA 645 Zoom 150–300 mm F5.6 ED [IF] (current)
- Rear Converter-A 645 1.4X (current) - AF lenses become manual focus
- Rear Converter-A 645 2X (current) - AF lenses become manual focus

== See also ==
- Pentax cameras
- List of Pentax products

| Kind | Type | Focal length | Aperture | 84 | 85 | 86 | 87 | 88 | 89 | 1990 | 91 | 92 | 93 | 94 | 95 | 96 | 97 | 98 | 99 | 2000 | 01 | 02 | 03 | 04 | 05 | 06 | 07 | 08 | 09 | 2010 | 11 | 12 | 13 | 14 | 15 | 16 | 17 | 18 | 19 | 2020 | 21 | 22 | 23 | 24 |
| Prime | UWA | 25 | 4.0 | | | | | | | | | | | | | | | | | | | | | | | | | | | | D FA | DA 25mm f/4 AL SDM AW | | | | | | | | | | | | |
| Prime | Wide | 35 | 3.5 | | | | A 645 35mm f/3.5 | | | | | | | | | | | | | | | | FA 645 35mm f/3.5 AL | | | | | | | | | | | | HD D FA 35mm f/3.5 AL SDM AW | | | | | | | | | |
| Prime | normal | 45 | 2.8 | A 645 45mm f/2.8 | | | | | | | | | | | | | FA 645 45mm f/2.8 | | | | | | | | | | | | | | | | | | | | | | | | | | | |
| Prime | normal | 55 | 2.8 | A 645 55mm f/2.8 | | | | | | | | | | | | | | | | | | | | | | | | | | D FA 645 55mm f/2.8 | | | | | | | | | | | | | | |
| Prime | normal | 75 | 2.8 | A 75mm f/2.8 | | | | | | | | | | | | | FA 75mm f/2.8 | | | | | | | | | | | | | | | | | | | | | | | | | | | |
| Prime | normal | 75 | 2.8 | 645 LS 75mm f/2.8 | | | | | | | | | | | | | | | | | | | | | | | | | | | | | | | | | | | | | | | | |
| Prime | Short Tele | 90 | 2.8 | | | | | | | | | | | | | | | | | | | | | | | | | | | | | D FA 645 90mm f/2.8 Macro ED AW SR | | | | | | | | | | | | |
| Prime | Short Tele | 120 | 4.0 | | | | A 645 120mm f/4.0 Macro | | | | | | | | | | | | FA 645 120mm f/4.0 Macro | | | | | | | | | | | | | | | | | | | | | | | | | |
| Prime | Tele | 135 | 4.0 | | | | Pentax 645 LS 135mm f/4.0 | | | | | | | | | | | | | | | | | | | | | | | | | | | | | | | | | | | | | |
| Prime | Tele | 150 | 2.8 | | | | | | | | | | | | | | | | | | FA 645 150mm f/2.8 ED | | | | | | | | | | | | | | | | | | | | | | | |
| Prime | Tele | 150 | 3.5 | A 645 150mm f/3.5 | | | | | | | | | | | | | | | | | | | | | | | | | | | | | | | | | | | | | | | | |
| Prime | Tele | 200 | 4.0 | A 645 200mm f/4.0 | | | | | | | | | | | | | | | FA 645 200mm f/4.0 ED | | | | | | | | | | | | | | | | | | | | | | | | | |
| Prime | Super tele | 300 | 4.0 | A* 645 300mm f/4.0 ED | | | | | | | | | | | | | FA* 645 300mm f/4.0 ED | | | | | | | | | | | | | | | | | | | | | | | | | | | |
| Prime | Super tele | 300 | 5.6 | | | | | | | | | | | | | | | | | | | | FA 645 300mm f/5.6 ED | | | | | | | | | | | | | | | | | | | | | |
| Prime | Super tele | 400 | 5.6 | | | | | | | | | | | | | | FA 645 400mm f/5.6 ED | | | | | | | | | | | | | | | | | | | | | | | | | | | |
| Prime | Super tele | 600 | 5.6 | | | | A* 645 600mm f/5.6 ED | | | | | | | | | | | | | | | | | | | | | | | | | | | | | | | | | | | | | |
| Zoom | UWA | 28-45 | 4.5 | | | | | | | | | | | | | | | | | | | | | | | | | | | | | | | HD DA 645 28-45mm f/4.5 | | | | | | | | | | |
| Zoom | Wide | 33-55 | 4.5 | | | | | | | | | | | | | | | | | | | FA 645 33-55mm f/4.5 | | | | | | | | | | | | | | | | | | | | | | |
| Zoom | Univ. | 45-85 | 4.5 | A 645 45-85mm f/4.5 | | | | | | | | | | | | | FA 645 45-85mm f/4.5 | | | | | | | | | | | | | | | | | | | | | | | | | | | |
| Zoom | Univ. | 55-110 | 5.6 | | | | | | | | | | | | | | | | | | | FA 645 55-110mm f/5.6 | | | | | | | | | | | | | | | | | | | | | | |
| Zoom | Tele | 80-160 | 4.5 | A 645 80-160mm f/4.5 | | | | | | | | | | | | | FA 645 80-160mm f/4.5 | | | | | | | | | | | | | | | | | | | | | | | | | | | |
| Zoom | Tele | 150-300 | 4.0 | | | | | | | | | | | | | | | | | | | | FA 645 150-300mm f/5.6 | | | | | | | | | | | | | | | | | | | | | |
| Teleconverter | | | | A 645 1.4x | | | | | | | | | | | | | | | | | | | | | | | | | | | | | | | | | | | | | | | | |
| Teleconverter | | | | | | | | | | | | | | A 645 2x | | | | | | | | | | | | | | | | | | | | | | | | | | | | | | |
| Kind | Type | Focal length | Aperture | 84 | 85 | 86 | 87 | 88 | 89 | 1990 | 91 | 92 | 93 | 94 | 95 | 96 | 97 | 98 | 99 | 2000 | 01 | 02 | 03 | 04 | 05 | 06 | 07 | 08 | 09 | 2010 | 11 | 12 | 13 | 14 | 15 | 16 | 17 | 18 | 19 | 2020 | 21 | 22 | 23 | 24 |

| Type | Sensor | Class | 2003 | 2004 | 2005 | 2006 | | 2007 | 2008 | 2009 | 2010 | 2011 | 2012 | 2013 | 2014 | 2015 | 2016 | 2017 | 2018 | 2019 | 2020 | 2021 | 2022 | 2023 | 2024 | 2025 |
| DSLR | MF | Professional | | | | | | | | | | 645D | | | | 645Z | | | | | | | | | | |
| DSLR | FF | Professional | | | | | | | | | | | | | | | | K-1 | | K-1 II | | | | | | |
| DSLR | APS-C | High-end | | | | | | | | | | | | | | | K-3 II | | | | | | K-3 III | | | |
| DSLR | APS-C | High-end | | | | | | | | | | | | | K-3 | | | | | | | | | | | |
| DSLR | APS-C | Advanced | | | | | | | | | K-7 | K-5 | | K-5 II / K-5 IIs | | | | | | | | | | | | |
| DSLR | APS-C | Advanced | | *ist D | | | K10D | | K20D | | | | | | | | | KP | | | | | | | | |
| DSLR | APS-C | Midrange | | | | | K100D | 100DS | K200D | | | | | K-30 | K-50 | | | K-70 | | | | | | KF | | |
| DSLR | APS-C | Entry-level | | | *ist DS | *ist DS2 | | | | | | K-r | | | K-500 | K-S2 | | | | | | | | | | |
| DSLR | APS-C | Entry-level | | | *ist DL | DL2 | K110D | | | K-m/K2000 | K-x | | | | | K-S1 | | | | | | | | | | |
| MILC | APS-C | K-mount | | | | | | | | | | | K-01 | | | | | | | | | | | | | |
| MILC | 1/1.7" | Q-mount | | | | | | | | | | | | | Q7 | | | | | | | | | | | |
| MILC | 1/1.7" | Q-mount | | | | | | | | | | | | | | Q-S1 | | | | | | | | | | |
| MILC | 1/2.3" | Q-mount | | | | | | | | | | | Q | Q10 | | | | | | | | | | | | |
| DSLR | Prototypes | | MZ-D (2000); 645D Prototype (2006); AP 50th Anniv. (2007) | | | | | | | | | | | | | | | | | | | | | | | |
| Type | Sensor | Class | | | | | | | | | | | | | | | | | | | | | | | | |
| Type | Sensor | Class | 2003 | 2004 | 2005 | 2006 | | 2007 | 2008 | 2009 | 2010 | 2011 | 2012 | 2013 | 2014 | 2015 | 2016 | 2017 | 2018 | 2019 | 2020 | 2021 | 2022 | 2023 | 2024 | 2025 |
