= Kodak Vigilant camera =

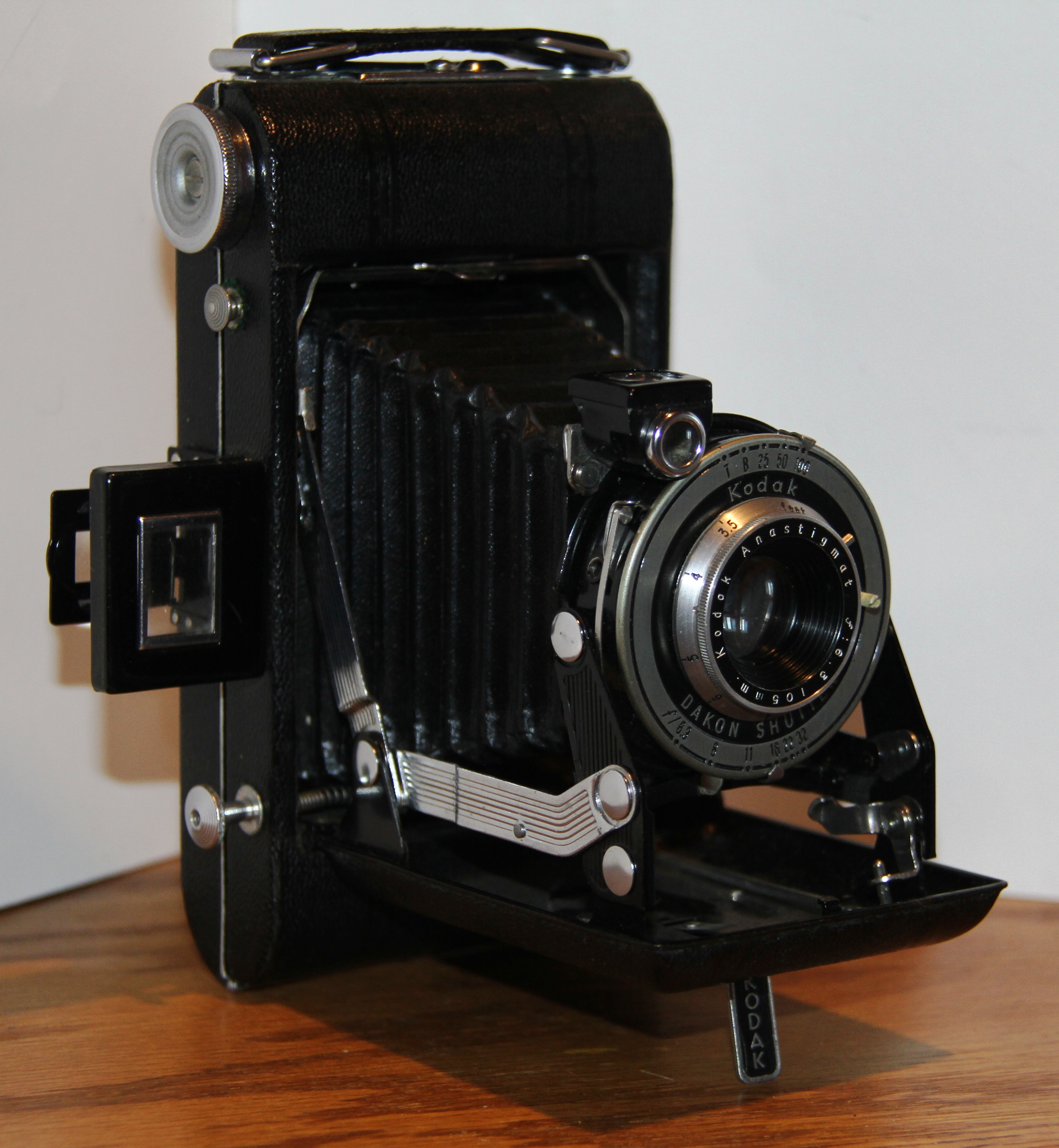
Kodak Vigilant Six-20 Camera

The Kodak Vigilant and Monitor cameras were popular folding bellows cameras made from 1939 to 1949. They featured an optical viewfinder without a rangefinder, adjustable focus lenses, and various models of shutters with speed up to 1/200 sec. Lenses available were a F/4.5 105mm, F/6.3 105mm and a F/8.8 100mm. They take 620 film, and produce a 2 1/4" x 3 1/4" inch medium format negative. The cameras can produce very sharp photos if used on a tripod and the manual distance setting on the lens is correct.
