= Fujicolor Pro =

Line of professional color negative films

Pro 160S & Pro 160NS
- Maker: Fujifilm
- Speed: 160/23°
- Type: Color print
- Balance: Daylight
- Process: C-41
- Format: 120, 220, 4×5 in, 8×10 in
- Grain: Fine (RMS 3)
- Exposure latitude: -1 to +3 EV
- Application: Portraiture, weddings, fashion
- Introduced: 2004
- Discontinued: 2021

Pro 160C
- Maker: Fujifilm
- Speed: 160/23°
- Type: Color print
- Balance: Daylight
- Process: C-41
- Format: 135, 120, 220
- Grain: Fine (RMS 3)
- Exposure latitude: -1 to +3 EV
- Application: Architecture, interiors, fashion
- Introduced: 2004
- Discontinued: 2010

Pro 400H
- Maker: Fujifilm
- Speed: 400/27°
- Type: Color print
- Balance: Daylight
- Process: C-41
- Format: 35mm, 120, 220
- Grain: Fine (RMS 4)
- Saturation: "Soft"
- Application: Portraiture, weddings, fashion
- Introduced: 2004
- Discontinued: 2021

Pro 800Z
- Maker: Fujifilm
- Speed: 800/30°
- Type: Color print
- Balance: Daylight
- Process: C-41
- Format: 35mm, 120, 220
- Grain: medium (RMS 5)
- Saturation: "Soft"
- Application: Weddings, fashion, interiors
- Introduced: 2004
- Discontinued: 2009

Fujicolor Pro was a line of professional color negative films from Japanese company Fujifilm introduced in 2004 for weddings, portraits, fashion and commercial photography. It originally comprised four emulsions: Pro 160S, Pro 160C, Pro 400H and Pro 800Z. Its main competitor was Kodak Portra.

In 2021 further production of the two remaining emulsions, Pro 160NS, distributed in Japan only, and Pro 400H, distributed globally, was ended.

== History ==
The "Pro" film line was introduced in 2004 to mark the replacement of the last of the 'NP' series films, with the new 160 ISO emulsions adjusted to be finer grained (RMS 3 rather than 4) compared to their NPS/C equivalent and have a more neutral colour balance in line with the recently updated 400 and 800 emulsions.

The preceding 'NP' series of films were:

- NPS 160 (–2004) Daylight balanced film for 'S'hort exposures. Replaced by Pro 160S.
- NPC 160 (–2004) Daylight balanced film, higher 'C'ontrast than NPS. Replaced by Pro 160C.
- NPL 160 (–2004) Tungsten balanced colour film, also for 'L'ong exposures. Not carried forward into Pro line.
- NPH 400 (2002–2004) Daylight balanced film, renamed Pro 400H.
- NPZ 800 (2002–2004) Daylight balanced film, renamed Pro 800Z.

All Pro films incorporate: sigma fine grain technology, neutral color balance for improved skin tones, a fourth cyan layer for improved color rendition under fluorescent lighting and were optimized for scanning and single channel printing. They also have 'easy end seal' peel and stick tape on roll films.

Colors are generally 'cooler' than the equivalent Kodak Portra films.

All formats of Pro 800Z were discontinued in 2009/10 due to low demand. Pro 160C was discontinued in 2010 and Pro 160S was renamed Pro 160NS. However this film was only distributed in Europe, Asia & Australia (not USA). Pro 160 NS sheet film was discontinued in 2016. Pro 160NS in 120 was discontinued in the UK in late 2017 and in the rest of Europe in late 2018. Pro 400H was discontinued in all formats and markets in January 2021 and Pro 160NS in Japan in October 2021.

== Emulsions ==
=== Pro 160C (2004–2010) ===
Pro 160C was an ISO 160 daylight-type color negative film designed for professional use, featuring a gradation design optimized for exposures requiring high-contrast results. It was discontinued in 2010.

=== Pro 160S and 160NS (2004-2021) ===
Pro 160S was an ISO 160 daylight-type color negative film designed for professional use, featuring more highly optimized skin tone reproduction, soft contrast (forgiving for portraits) and neutral gray balance, especially important for wedding and portrait photography. It was available in 135, 120, 220 (triacetate base) and sheet film; 4x5", 8x10" (polyester base).

In 2010 it was renamed Pro 160NS with no change to the emulsion, available in 120, 220 and sheet film and only distributed in Europe, Asia and Australia. 135 format was discontinued at the same time. With 220 already discontinued, sheet film was discontinued 2016. 120 format was stated as being discontinued in 2017 by retailers in the UK (no official announcement), but remained on sale from stock into early 2018. In late 2018 Pro 160NS was also stated as being discontinued by retailers in Germany with stock expiry dates of February 2019. It was announced to be discontinued in October 2021 in Japan. Predicted end of supply is March 2022.

=== Pro 400H (2004-2021) ===
Fujicolor Pro 400H was an ISO 400 fine grain natural color professional film for weddings, portraits, and fashion with a fourth color layer on triacetate base. Formats: 135, 120, 220

The 400H emulsion was originally launched as NPH400 in 2002. The bright, colorful, and fine-grained 400 speed film featured improved skin tones, much more accurate color reproduction, better shadow detail, and wider exposure latitude. It featured Fuji's new peel and stick paper backing. It was renamed in 2004 to Pro 400H and with new packaging to bring it into line with the new 160 line of films, but with no change to the emulsion.

220 format was discontinued in 2013 along with 135-24 exp and 135 multipacks. In January 2021, Fujifilm announced that 400H was to be discontinued in both 135 and 120 formats in all markets. The reason for the sudden discontinuation compared to previous films on the range, was not lack of sales, but difficulty in procuring key raw materials for new master roll production. Predicted end of supply; 135 format - immediately in N.America (March 2021 in Japan). 120 format - Dec 21 in N.America (March 2022 Japan), later brought forward to June 2021 due to demand.

=== Pro 800Z (2004–2009) ===
FujiColor Pro 800Z was an ISO 800 fine grain natural color professional film for weddings, portraits, and fashion with a fourth color layer on triacetate base. It was available in 135, 120 and 220 format. The Pro 800Z emulsion was originally launched as NPZ800 in 2002 and renamed Pro 800Z in 2004 with new packaging to bring it into line with the new 160 line of films, but with no change to the emulsion. It was discontinued in 2009/10.

== See also ==
- Kodak Portra - A similar family of films from Kodak
- List of photographic films
- List of discontinued photographic films
