= Kodak Portra =

Family of negative camera film

Portra 160
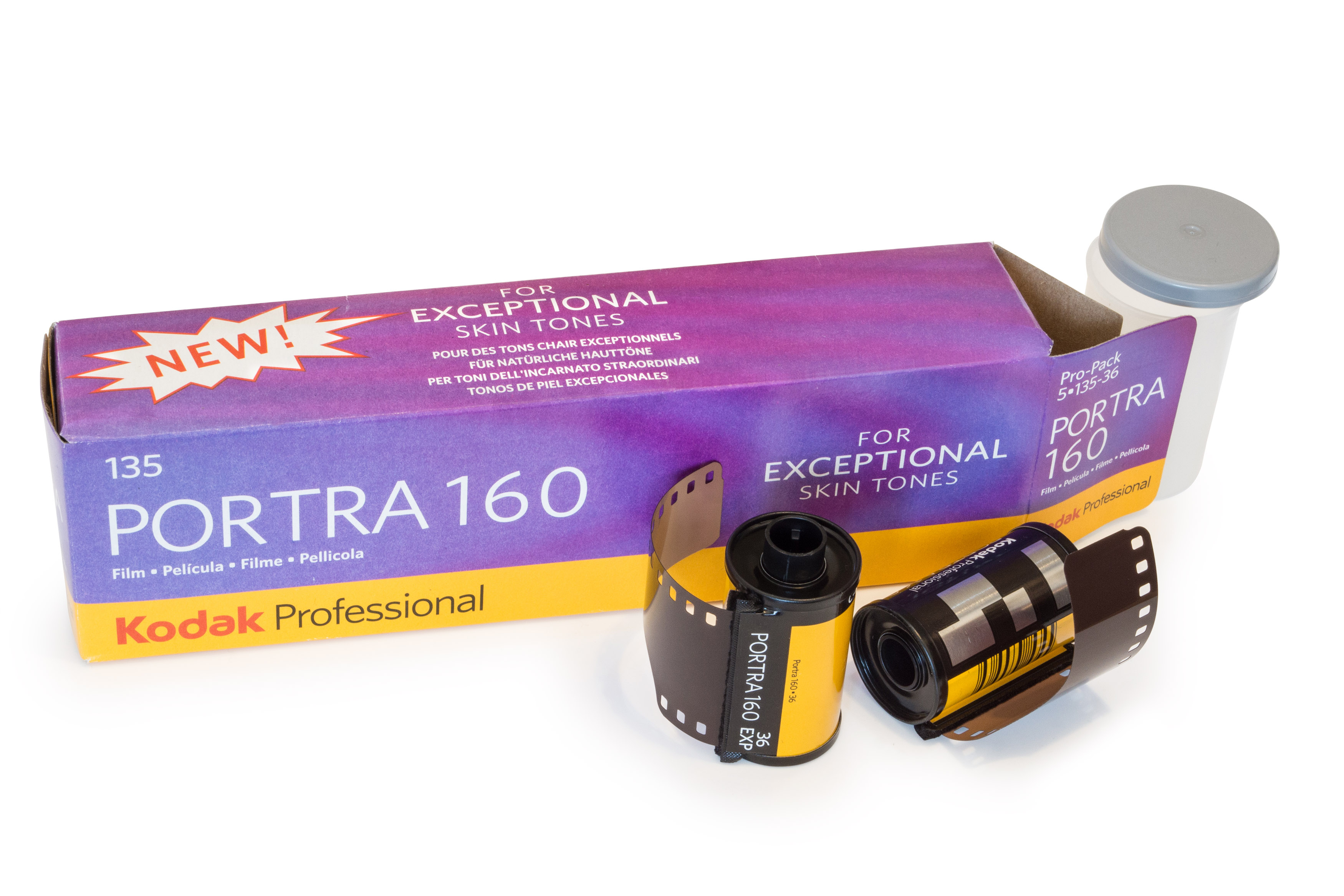
- Maker: Kodak
- Speed: 160/23°
- Type: Color print
- Balance: Daylight
- Process: C-41
- Format: 35mm, 120, 220, 4×5 in, 10x8 in
- Grain: "Extremely fine"
- Saturation: "Balanced"
- Application: Portraiture

Portra 400
- Speed: 400/27°
- Type: Color
- Format: 35mm, 120, 220, 4×5 in, 10x8 in
- Grain: "Very Fine"
- Saturation: "Balanced"
- Application: Portraiture, Travel

Portra 800
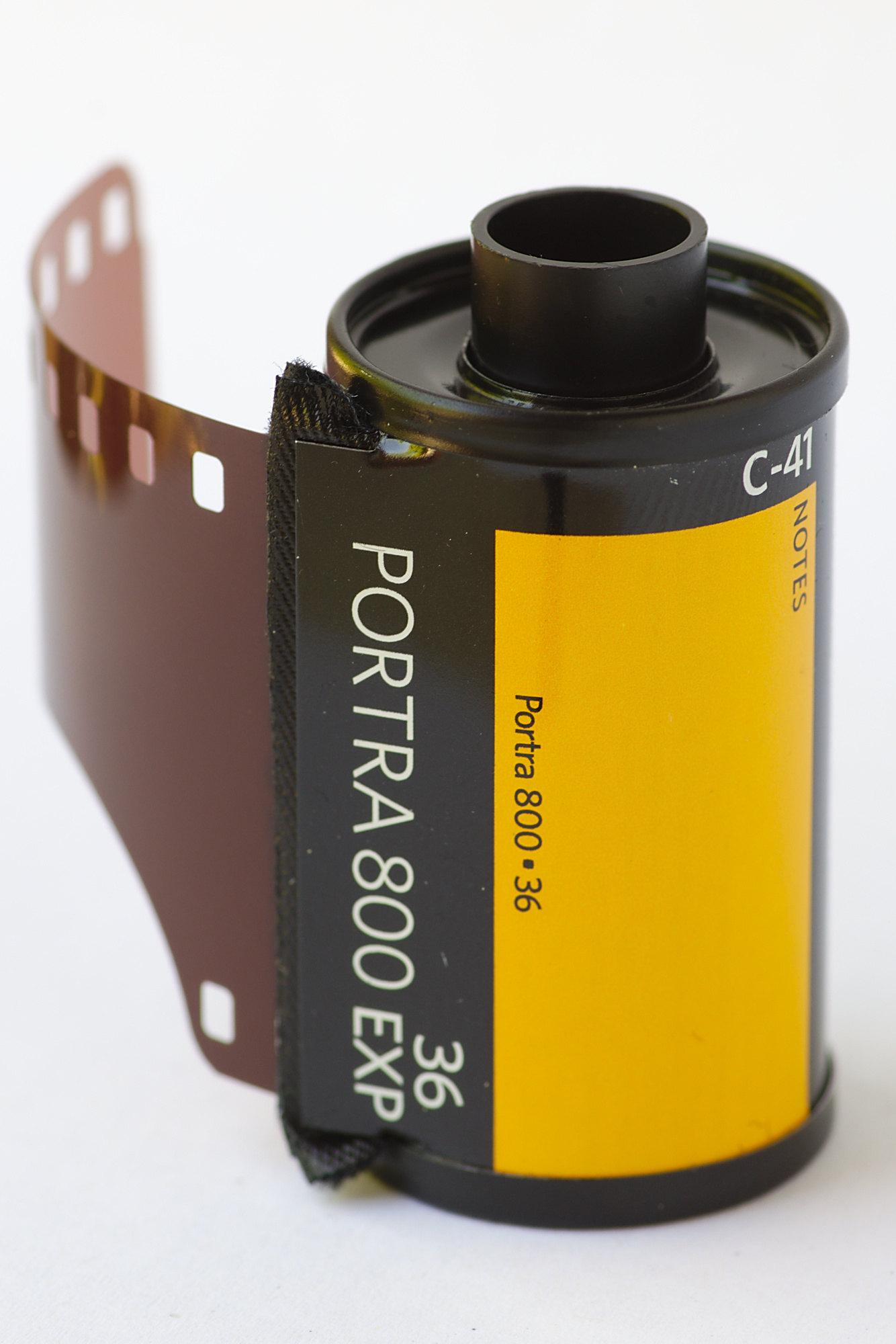
- Speed: 800/30°
- Type: Color
- Format: 35mm, 120, 220
- Grain: "Very fine"
- Saturation: "Balanced"
- Application: Portraiture

Portra is a family of daylight-balanced professional color negative films originally introduced in 1998, it was made mainly for portrait and wedding applications. They are successors of the professional Vericolor films (VPS and VPL), which succeeded Ektacolor films earlier. The films are available in three speeds — 160, 400, and 800 ISO — with the 160 and 400 speed formerly available as "natural color" (NC) and "vivid color" (VC) varieties before the 2011 update.

It is still manufactured by Eastman Kodak but distributed and marketed by Kodak Alaris, as with other products under Kodak Professional banner.

The film has been upgraded by newer versions several times in the last few years, starting in 2006, to improve grain and scanning performance.

== 2010 Portra 400 upgrade ==
Kodak introduced a new version of the Portra 400 film which replaced the NC and VC versions in late 2010. The new film incorporates a number of technological advances from the Kodak Vision line of motion pictures films. Kodak lists finer grain, improved sharpness over 400 NC and naturally rendered skin tones as some of the improvements over the existing NC and VC line.

Kodak also lists improved scanning performance as a feature. The "NC" and "VC" varieties of the film were introduced to address the need for different levels of contrast and color saturation when printing, and adjusting these image attributes tend to be more difficult with traditional color darkroom printing than with digital imaging. This has influenced a decision to merge the two varieties of the film based on the assumption that most prints are currently made from digital scans which allow for these adjustments to be carried out digitally.

== 2011 Portra 160 upgrade ==
Kodak announced in February 2011 that Portra 160 was to be similarly replaced by a single version like the 400 and incorporate the same upgrades as the new 400 speed version. This has been available since mid-2011 in 135, 120, 220 and sheet format. The new film is easy to scan, according to reviews.

== See also ==
- Fujicolor Pro - A similar family of films from Fujifilm
- List of photographic films
- List of discontinued photographic films
