= Kodak Starflash =

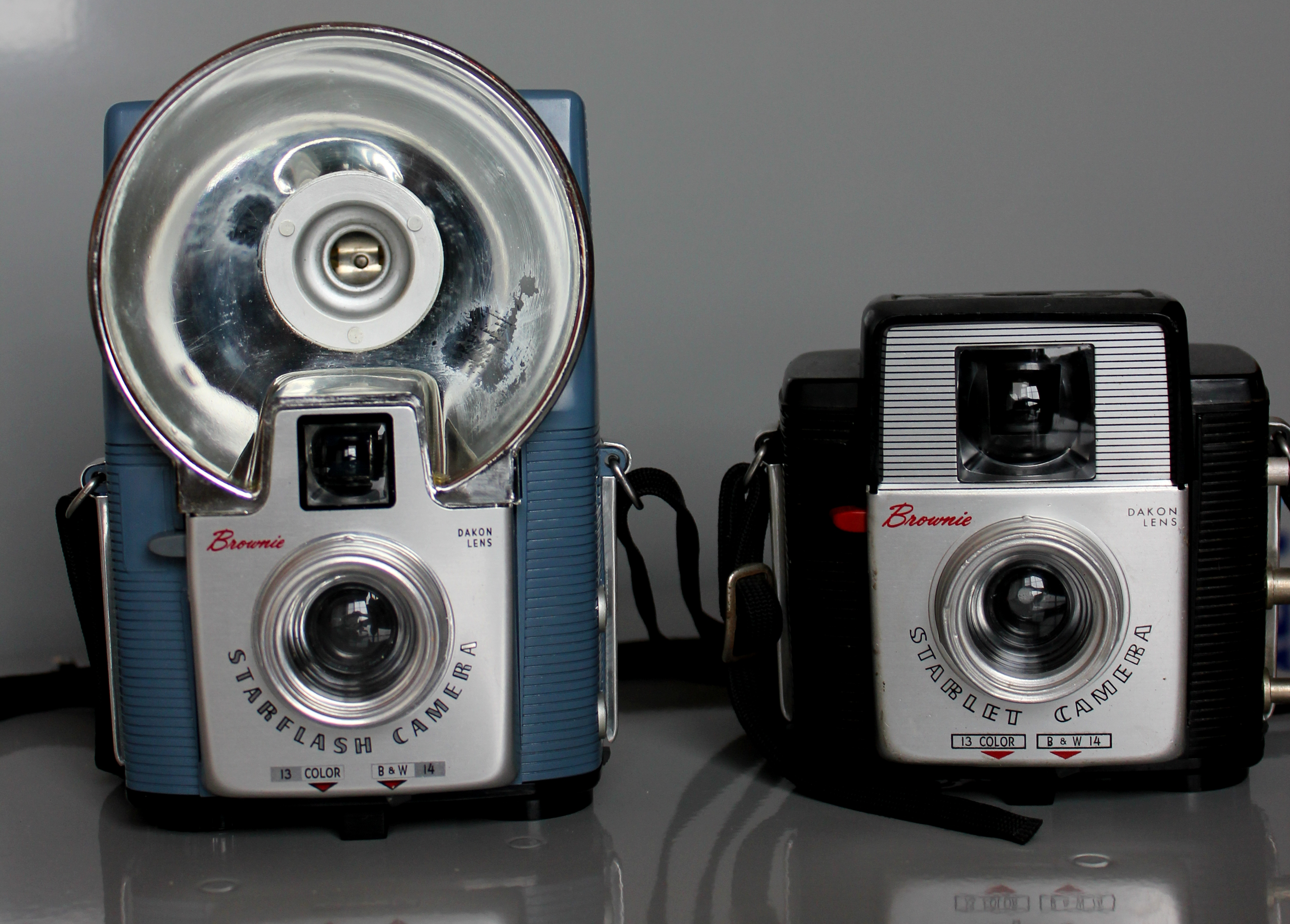
Kodak Starflash and Starlet

The Kodak Starflash belongs to the Kodak Brownie Star- lineup of cameras made by the Eastman Kodak Company in the United States, France and Australia between 1957-1965 and sold for $8.50 ($92 in 2026).

Similar to the Kodak Brownie Starlet, the Starflash features an integrated flashgun accepting M-2 style flashbulbs, as well as M-5 and M-25 bulbs for longer range photos. The viewfinder is slightly smaller to accommodate the large parabolic reflector.

Unlike other cameras in the series, the flash sync terminals are present, however covered due to the integrated flash gun.

The Starflash accepts type 127 film and slides, in both black and white and color and contains an aperture adjustment below the lens to accommodate the various film types supported. The images generated on film are 4 cm × 4 cm (1 5/8 in × 1 5/8 in).

The rear of the camera features a flashbulb eject button, the viewfinder, and a red disc to protect the film from accidental exposure while providing readout of the current film position. It also features a battery door to power the flash, requiring two 1.5 volt Penlite batteries of at least 3.5 amperes each.

The underside of the camera features a film wind knob and film eject knob which causes the interior to slide out and allows access to the film payout and take-up reels for changing the film.

The lens is a single-element plastic Dakon lens, with a fixed focal range between 2 meters (6.6 feet) and infinity.

== Release Dates ==
Color	Release date	Discontinued
Black	1957	1965
Red	1958	1960
White	1958	1962
Blue	1958	1962
Coca-Cola	1959	1961
