= ISO 732 =

ISO standard for medium format photographic film

ISO 732 is an ISO standard for medium format photographic film. The second (1982) edition of the standard specified the dimensions for 127, 120 and 620 roll film, backing paper and film spools. The third (1991) edition dropped specifications for the 127 and 620 roll films, which had become largely obsolete in the photography industry and added specifications for 220 roll film. The current (2000) edition incorporates the now withdrawn standard ISO 1048 on identification of exposed roll films.

120, 220, and 620 film are closely related formats, using film rolls of the same width, while 127 film is smaller in width. The formats and their names predate ISO standardization and were developed by Kodak.
