= Zeiss Ikon Kolibri =

Kolibri
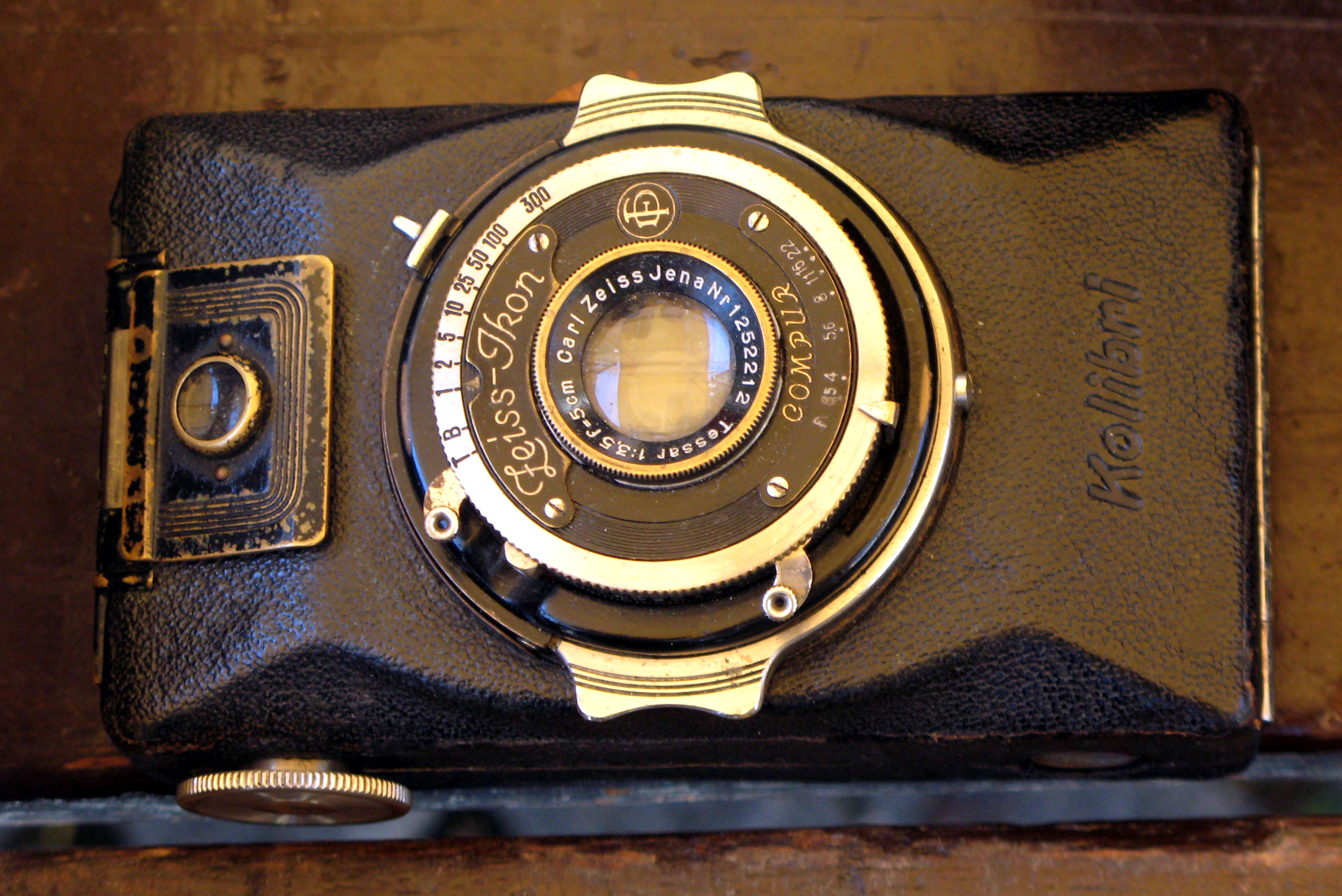

Overview
- Type: 127 film camera

Lens
- Lens mount: fixed collapsible lens

Focusing
- Focus: manual

Exposure/metering
- Exposure: manual

The Kolibri 523/18 was a camera by Zeiss Ikon, made between 1930 and 1935.

The Kolibri took sixteen 3x4cm exposures on 127 film. The camera featured a collapsible lens tube and was arranged in a vertical format, with a flip-up viewfinder on the top. On the right-hand side was the winding knob and a tripod bush; there was another tripod bush at the bottom. The lens had small "feet" on either side, so the camera would stand horizontally, and a strut could be fixed below the lens to balance the camera vertically. There were two red windows on the back, for the small image format. A supplementary close-up lens was available, called Proxar, which allowed focusing down to 30 cm.

- Lens: Carl Zeiss Tessar 5 cm/f3.5 or f4.5, Novar f6.3 or Biotar f2.
- Shutter: Compur (1-1/300s + T & B) or Telma (1/25, 1/50, 1/100 + B & T)
- Film: 127, 16 3x4cm images
