= HD Pentax-DA 645 28-45mm F4.5 ED AW SR =

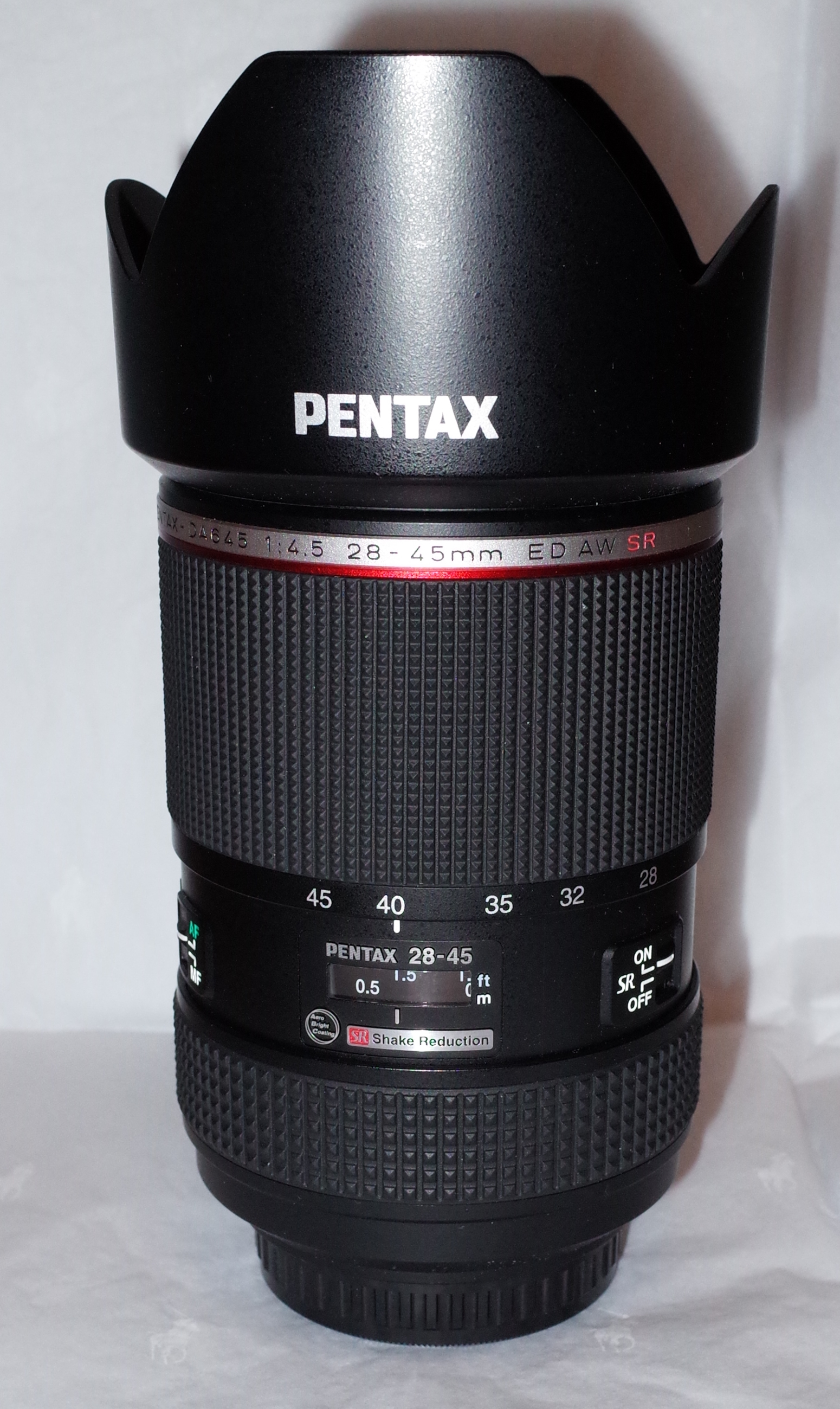
- Maker: Ricoh Imaging
- Lens mount(s): Pentax 645AF2

Technical data
- Type: Zoom
- Focus drive: In-lens DC micromotor
- Focal length: 28-45mm
- Focal length (35mm equiv.): 22-35.5mm
- Aperture (max/min): f/4.5 / f/32
- Close focus distance: 0.40 metres (1.3 ft)
- Max. magnification: 0.21
- Diaphragm blades: 9
- Construction: 17 elements in 12 groups

Features
- Manual focus override: Yes Yes
- Weather-sealing: Yes Yes
- Lens-based stabilization: Yes Yes
- Aperture ring: No No
- Application: Landscape and architectural photography

Physical
- Diameter: 99 millimetres (3.9 in)
- Weight: 1,470 grams (3.24 lb)
- Filter diameter: 82mm

Accessories
- Lens hood: PH-RBC82
- Case: S120-210

History
- Introduction: 2014

Retail info
- MSRP: $4999.95 USD

The HD Pentax-DA 645 28-45mm F4.5 ED AW SR is a wide angle zoom lens for the Pentax 645 medium format system, announced by Ricoh on August 4, 2014.

== Bibliography ==
- http://www.dpreview.com/products/pentax/lenses/pentax_hd_da_645ed_28-45_f4p5_aw_sr/specifications
