= 127 film =

Still photography film format

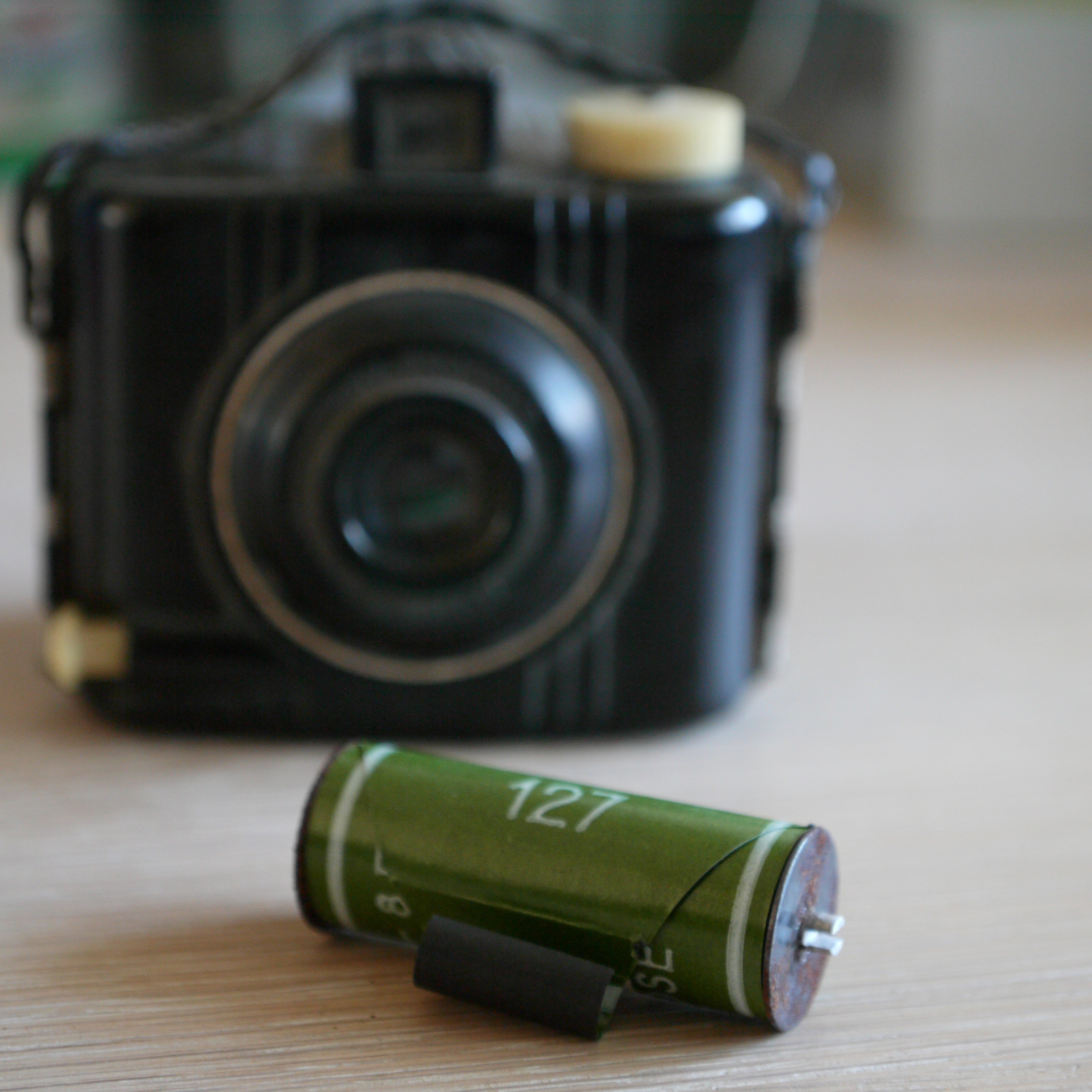
127 film roll with "Baby Brownie Special" in the background

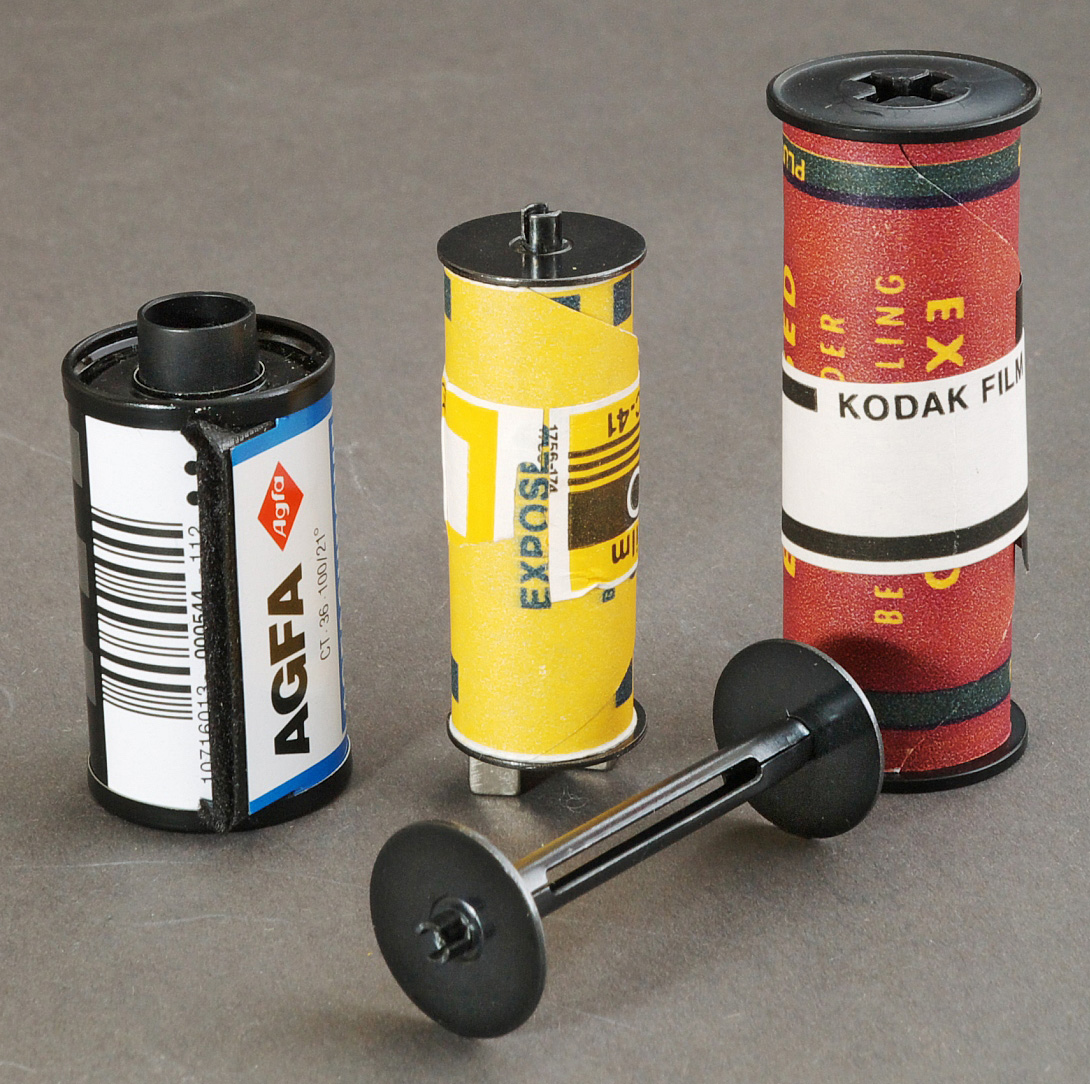
127 film (center, with spindle) sits between 35 mm (left) and 120 roll film (right) formats in terms of size.

127 is a roll film format for still photography introduced by Kodak in 1912.

The film itself is 46 mm wide, placing it between 35 mm and 120 "medium format" films in terms of size. The image format normally used is a square 4 cm × 4 cm. However, rectangular 4 cm × 3 cm and 4 cm × 6.5 cm are also standard.

127 enjoyed mainstream popularity until its usage began to decline from the 1960s onwards in the face of newer, cartridge-based films. However, as of 2026 it survives as a niche format and is still in limited production. Hobbyists have also developed devices for cutting readily available 120 film into 127 size.

== Technical details ==
127 is a roll film, 46 mm wide. Frame number markings for the 4×4 and 4×6 image formats are printed on the backing paper, while 4×3 cameras typically have two frame counter windows, exposing the left and right halves of the 4×6 frame.

Using the square format, there are 12 exposures per roll; 4×3 and 4×6 give 16 and 8, respectively.

Less commonly, other frame sizes have been used. For its "Alfax" model (circa 1940), Kimura Kōgaku had 4 cm × 4.5 cm frames, spaced by markings on the wind knob. In addition, the manufacturer C. F. Foth & Co. used an image format of 3.6 cm × 2.4 cm (the same size as is standard for 135) for initial versions of their 127-based "Derby" camera.

== History ==
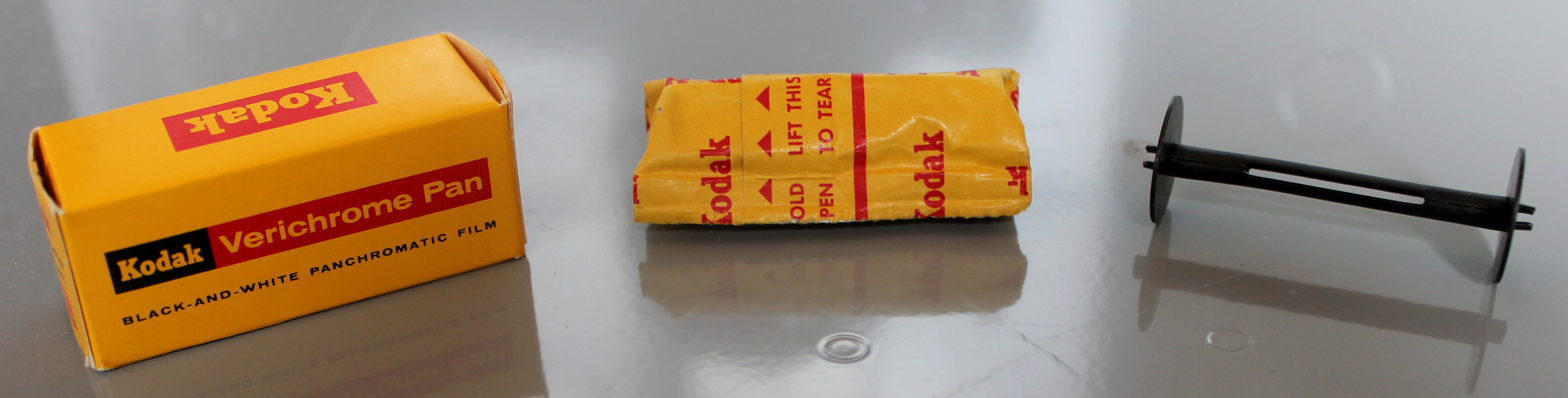
Kodak Verichrome VP127 film in various states

The format was introduced by Kodak in 1912, along with the Vest Pocket Kodak folding camera, as a compact alternative to larger portable cameras using 120 film. The folding "127s" were in fact smaller than most 35 mm cameras today. The 127 format made a comeback during the 1950s as the format of choice for small inexpensive cameras such as the Brownie and Satellite, and continued in wide use until surpassed by the 126 film and 110 film "Instamatic" cartridges (introduced in 1963 and 1972 respectively), and especially by 35 mm. 127 cameras from that era were often characterized by simple box-like construction. Slides shot on 127 slide film were often preferred over 35 mm for example for sets of slides sold at tourist gift shops, because of the larger photo area (hence the advertised name "Superslides") and completely square dimensions of a 127 slide. The format was part of the ISO 732 standard until it was dropped in the third (1991) edition of that standard.

== Variations ==
Not all 127 films were labelled as such. After 1913, many Kodak cameras included the Autographic feature, and Kodak's 127 films which had Autographic backing were identified as "A127". Other film manufacturers did not produce Autographic films, for which Kodak held a patent. Other camera manufacturers did make Vest Pocket-format cameras, however, and 127 film at the time was often labeled “Vest Pocket Film”.

== Uses ==
The format was mainly used for amateur cameras like the Brownie or the Zeiss Ikon Kolibri, with the Exakta SLR, the “Baby” Rolleiflex, the Yashica 44 TLR, the Komaflex-S SLR and the Primo jr as possible exceptions.

127 color transparencies can be mounted in standard 2” square slide mounts, and projected in an ordinary 35 mm projector. Because of their much greater area, the projected image is larger and more brilliant than a 35 mm slide, and they are popularly called "Superslides", a name once reserved for 40 × 40 mm slides cut down from 120 film.

== Production ==
Kodak stopped producing 127 film in July 1995, with all but one manufacturer following suit shortly thereafter. Fotokemika of Samobor, Croatia, continued to make 127 film, which it sold under its own Efke brand, as well as custom-packaged for other sellers, until 2012. Macophoto UP100 and Jessops 200 were made and packaged by Fotokemika. Chromazone 127 film is also sold intermittently on eBay. In September 2006, Bluefire Laboratories of Calgary, Alberta, Canada, began packaging 127 color print film, cutting Kodak or Agfa film to size from bulk rolls, and assembling the rolls of film from their own components.

In July 2009, Rollei (Maco Photo Products, Hans O. Mahn GmbH & Co. KG) introduced Rollei Retro 80S film, available in 127 format.

In August 2014, Maco announced that they will be selling black-and-white 127 film under the Rera Pan brand. This film is manufactured in Japan by EZOX Corporation, who are better known for manufacturing agricultural equipment and bicycles.

== See also ==
- Film format
- List of color film systems
- List of photographic film formats
