= Smc Pentax D FA 645 55mm F2.8 AL (IF) SDM AW =

smc Pentax D FA 645 55mm F2.8 AL (IF) SDM AW
- Maker: Pentax
- Lens mount(s): Pentax 645AF2

Technical data
- Type: Prime
- Focus drive: Ultrasonic
- Focal length: 55mm
- Aperture (max/min): f/2.8
- Close focus distance: 0.50 metres (1.6 ft)
- Max. magnification: 0.17
- Diaphragm blades: 9
- Construction: 9 elements in 7 groups

Features
- Manual focus override: Yes Yes
- Weather-sealing: Yes Yes
- Lens-based stabilization: No No
- Aperture ring: No No

Physical
- Max. length: 68 millimetres (2.7 in)
- Diameter: 81 millimetres (3.2 in)
- Weight: 416 grams (0.917 lb)
- Filter diameter: 67mm

Accessories
- Lens hood: PH-RBN 67mm

The smc Pentax D FA 645 55mm F2.8 AL (IF) SDM AW is an interchangeable camera lens by Pentax.
