= Smc Pentax-D FA 645 25mm F4 AL (IF) SDM AW =

smc Pentax-D FA 645 25mm F4 AL (IF) SDM AW
- Maker: Pentax
- Lens mount(s): Pentax 645AF2

Technical data
- Type: Prime
- Focus drive: Ultrasonic
- Focal length: 25mm
- Aperture (max/min): f/4.0
- Close focus distance: 0.40 metres (1.3 ft)
- Max. magnification: 0.11
- Diaphragm blades: 9
- Construction: 12 elements in 8 groups

Features
- Manual focus override: Yes Yes
- Weather-sealing: Yes Yes
- Lens-based stabilization: No No
- Aperture ring: No No

Physical
- Max. length: 140 millimetres (5.5 in)
- Diameter: 90 millimetres (3.5 in)
- Weight: 1,070 grams (2.36 lb)
- Filter diameter: 40.5mm

Accessories
- Lens hood: Built-in

The smc Pentax-D FA 645 25mm F4 AL (IF) SDM AW is an interchangeable camera lens for the Pentax 645 medium format system.
