= Pentax 6×7 =

SLR camera

Asahi Pentax 6×7 with grip
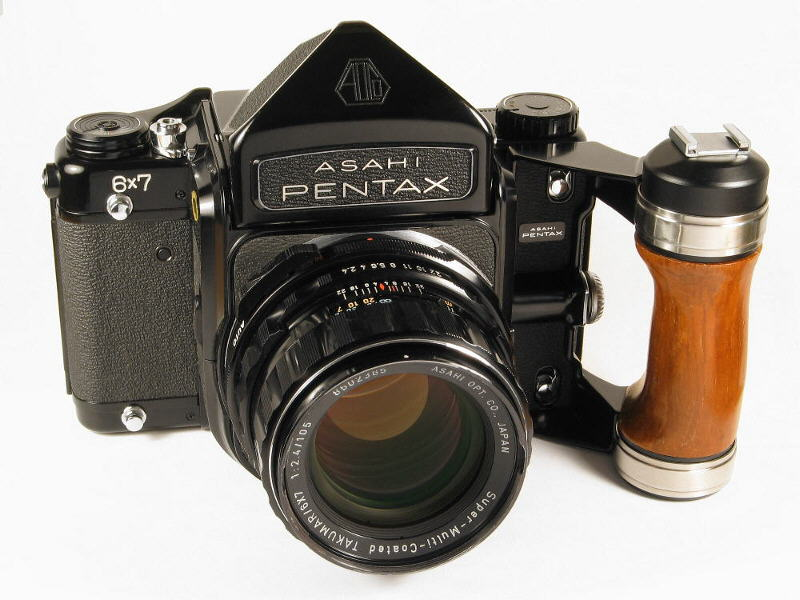

Overview
- Maker: Pentax
- Type: Medium format SLR camera for 120/220 roll film

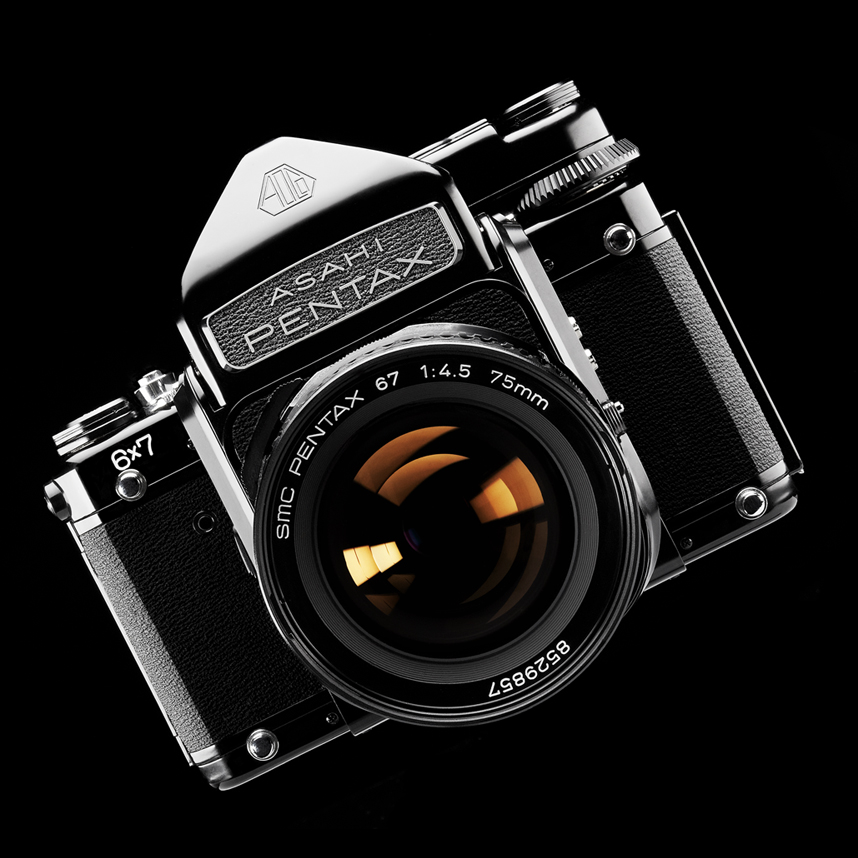
Pentax 6×7 front

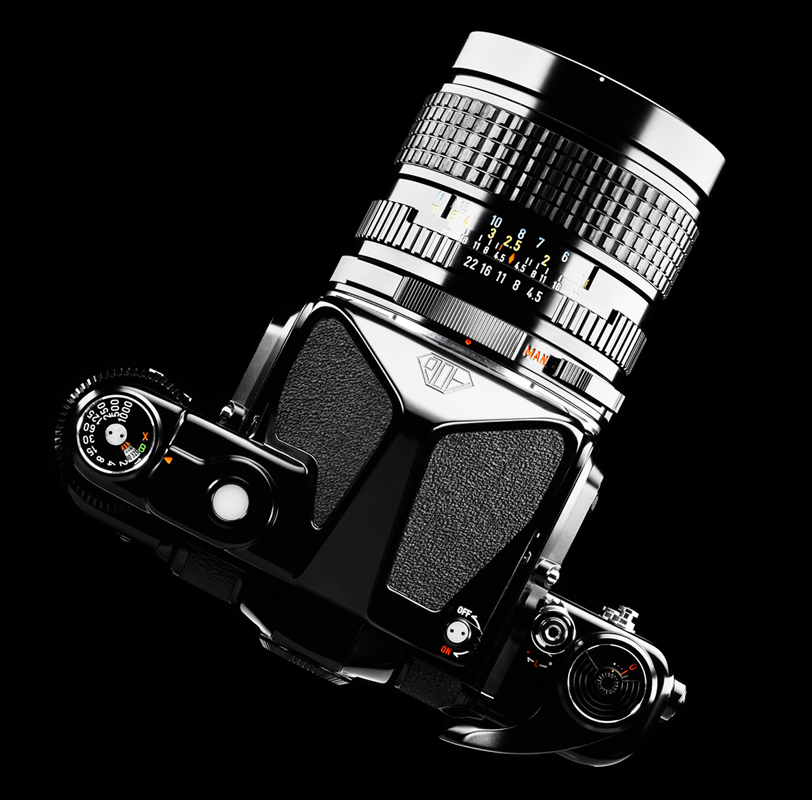
Pentax 6×7 top

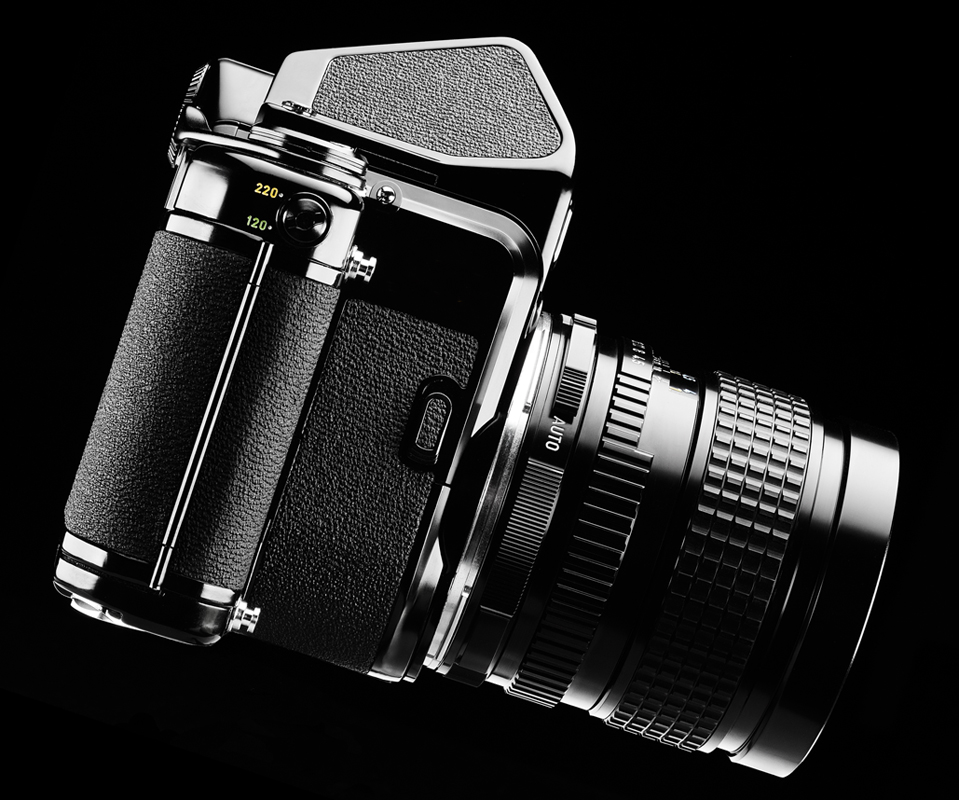
Pentax 6×7 side

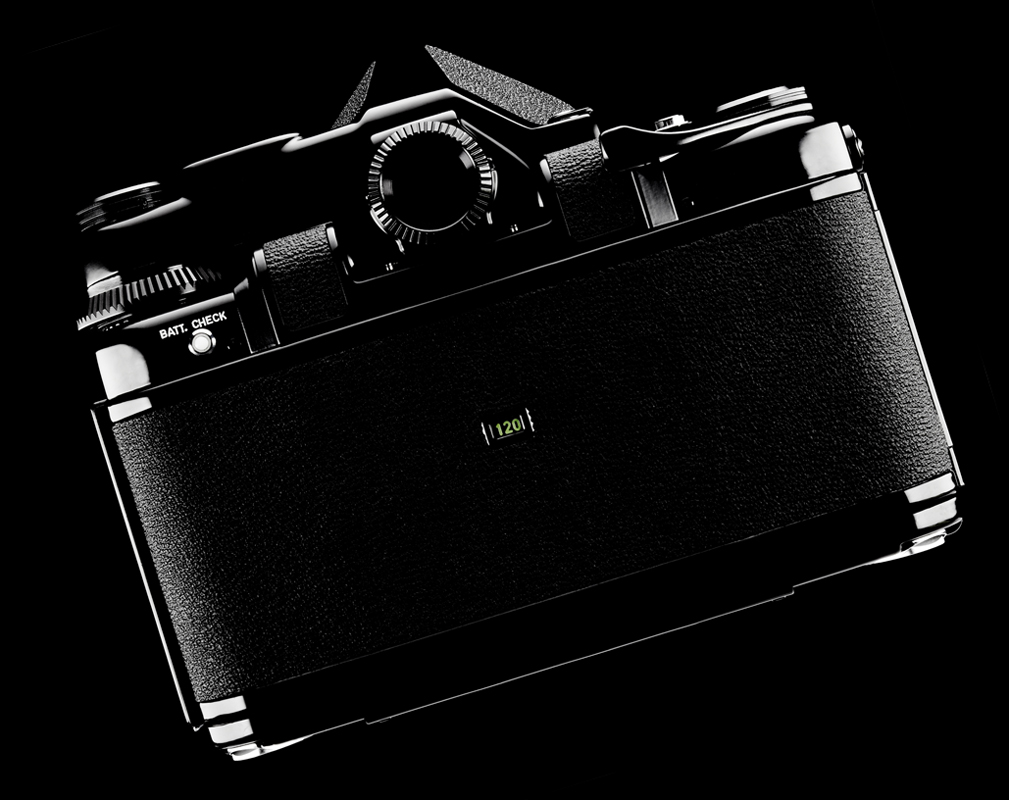
Pentax 6×7 back

The Pentax 6×7 (called "Pentax 67" after 1990) is a SLR medium format system film camera for 120 and 220 film, which produces images on the film that are nominally 6 cm by 7 cm in size (actual image on the film is 56 mm × 70 mm), made by Pentax. It originally debuted in 1965 as a prototype dubbed the Pentax 220. Since then, with improvements, it was released in 1969 as the Asahi Pentax 6×7, as well as the Honeywell Pentax 6×7 for the United States import market. In 1990, it received a number of minor engineering updates and cosmetic changes and was renamed as the Pentax 67.

The camera resembles a conventional 35 mm SLR camera, with interchangeable viewfinder and lens, but is considerably bigger and heavier, weighing 2.3 kilograms (5.1 lb) with the plain prism and standard (105 mm f/2.4) lens. It is perhaps inspired by the 1957 East German 6×6 KW Praktisix and its successor, the Pentacon Six, although the horizontal SLR concept can be traced back to the 1933 Ihagee VP Exakta.

The following models have been issued:

- Asahi Pentax 6×7 – the original model, launched in 1969 (first generation)
- Asahi Pentax 6×7 (MLU) – with a mirror lock-up mechanism, launched in 1976 (second generation)
- Pentax 67 – with minor cosmetic changes as well as some mechanical reliability changes, launched in 1989 (third generation)
- Pentax 67 II – the fourth generation model, launched in 1999

The Pentax 6×7 has a dual bayonet lens mount, and a wide range of interchangeable Takumar and later SMC Pentax 67-designated lenses exist. More than forty years after the original camera introduction a wide selection of lenses is still available, together with the latest Pentax 67 II variant.

== Description ==
The Pentax 6×7, designated product model number 400xxxx by Asahi Pentax, is similar to any traditional 35 mm SLR camera except in size. The Pentax 6×7 is an electromechanical design and shares much in concept with its smaller 135 format cousin the "Pentax Electro Spotmatic", however, is not equipped with an internal meter. Users familiar with the diminutive cousins in the 135 format would find the Pentax 6×7 an easy transition due to the layout of the camera. This hefty camera with a general dimension body of 7.25 inches × 4.5 inches × 3.75 inches (18 cm × 11 cm × 9.5 cm), and with the standard prism and 105 mm lens, would bring it to 7.5 inches × 5.75 inches × 6.5 inches (18 cm × 14.5 cm × 17 cm).

The most obvious difference with common SLRs is the location of the shutter speed knob being at the left hand top. Other small controls are easily located such as the lens release is on the left side of the mirror housing, the shutter release and film advance lever are located on the familiar right-hand side of the top. Because it uses 120 film, there is no provision for manual rewinding of film, as there would be for 35 mm film cameras.

At the front of the mirror housing is the Pentax 6×7 dual lens mount that allows for both "inner" as a familiar 3 flange proprietary arrangement and "outer" four flange symmetrical arranged bayonet. The latter (outer) was provided for use with larger and heavier telephoto lenses and allowed the body to rotate and lock in any of the four positions. Because of the rotatable mounting, an "outer" mounted lens would not have "automatic aperture" linkage rendering the use of the aperture as a stop-down method of operation.

Another versatile feature is the removable prism. By pressing in the two locking buttons on either side of the finder bay, access allows for an assortment of finders that can be fitted into the bay.

As the name implies, the 6×7 is a medium format camera and the negative produced is approximately 6 cm by 7 cm (actual format 56 mm × 70 mm, aspect ratio 5:4 = 1.25 ), and additionally the successors 67 and 67 II remain the same format. The Pentax 6×7 is able to use either the 120 or 220 film rolls, which produce ten or twenty frames, respectively (twenty-one for the 1969 version). A film roll format selector on the right-hand of the camera permits quick selection between 120 and 220 format film. Additionally, a change to the setting of the film selector must also match a change to the 120 or 220 position of the film pressure plate: The pressure plate keeps the film flat during exposure, aiding sharpness across the entire image (when the lens focal plane is also flat). Other systems use film tension alone, or against rails at the film's edge, in more compact vertical-feed magazines found in 6×6 or 6×4.5 formats.

The standard Pentax 6×7 outfit comprises the Super Takumar and later the Super Multi-Coated Takumar/6×7 105 mm f/2.4 and the pentaprism finder that allows for the through-the-lens actual image (90% of actual area) of what is being composed.

== Mechanical details ==
The camera is completely battery dependent. Power is provided by a 6 volt PX28 (originally Mercury-specified 1968, and Silver Oxide 1971), but equal substitutes PX28S/4SR44.

As with many systems of the era, the mirror and cloth curtains are mechanically-driven, the timing of the shutter being electrically governed by transistors and a magnet. The combination of resistors routed by the speed setting determine the length of time the magnet remains engaged.

The large cloth curtains as well as the size of the exposure area limits the maximum flash synchronizing speed to 1/30th of a second. Also, the operation of the shutter is not normally possible without film being loaded. However, one can test the shutter by rotating the counter dial away from the empty position while the film door is open and then by closing the film door while still holding the dial, thus facilitating the unlocking of the advance mechanism and operation of the shutter. It was also possible to check the shutter with a bypass key that was inserted in the frame counter engagement slot and allow for inspection of the shutter while the film door was open.

The frame counter is incremented only while there is film passing over the "main roller" or "counter roller" next to the take-up spool in the camera. The camera disengages the "transport system" when the counter dial (connected to the frame counting control cam) has reached the last frame, or when the counter has returned to the "empty" or start position. The automatic frame counter resets only if the shutter is released before opening the back.

Because of the electromagnetic operation of the shutter, a battery is required to power the timing as well as the holding of the curtain release mechanism when the release button is pressed. When there is a loss of adequate voltage, the camera cannot complete the operation cycle. In this state, the mechanically actuated mirror is allowed to rise, however, the curtain release mechanism would continue past the cycle and not fully disengage the curtains from the primed position. Therefore, the reset procedure will be necessary to bring the mirror back to finish the cycle. A small button located flush on the right-hand camera front, just below the shutter-release button, is provided for restarting of the mirror/shutter cycle and depressing the shutter release once more will release the cycle. In a situation where the shutter fails to fully operate, the frame is lost.

The shutter release button is standard threaded for pneumatic bulb/cable releases, an accessory timer or the use of a larger accessory ('soft touch') button.

The fingernail-operated latch to the left lower side releases the film door for loading. The film spools are secured by the pins and slot shaped opening at either end of the film spool. The camera has two twist-lock cams that turn and pull out to open, the left side for the unexposed roll and the right side, known as the "take-up" spool. Because of the arrangement differences of the 120 and 220 start length of paper, the indicated starting points are marked above the film plane for lining-up the START mark on the film.

The film advance system is a tension/friction type, the film source side being a tension brake and the take-up side torque/slip clutch.

A counting cam governs the frame count and interacts with the friction system to allow enough slip and movement to accurately space each frame from the beginning of the roll to the end. The counting cam also allows the system to regulate a lock to open and close, allowing the shutter to fire. This slip system has brought criticism of durability in early models, as it would slip more over time, causing frame spacing issues as well as disengaging the shutter. The frame counter system, tied to the counter roller, operates the automatic reset of the counter (i.e. returns it to start) whenever the back is opened, and also sets the regulating of the next frame.

== Later improvements ==
Over time the problematic advance mechanism was modified to increase reliability of the overall transport system. A phasing in of key replacements such as the replacement of the rubberized Counter Roller for a smooth metal roller, the internal Transport Control Wheel was replaced to reduce the number of frames and also requiring the Counter Control Cam to be replaced at the same time. The introduction of the improved parts also meant the ceasing of original first generation parts, inventory of stock parts would quickly become exhausted and the newly issued non-backward compatible of the parts would make remaining unmodified bodies requiring full upgrades to continue working. The improved parts would become standard replacements after the early 1974 for bodies coming in for servicing of the transport mechanism and would later be summarized and identified by the issuing of the parts catalogs in late 1974 and 1975 in the fall of 1986 for the Pentax 6×7 service bulletin as well as standard parts in the introduced 67 version launched in 1990.

Changes to the advance lever angle from a tipped out to a curled inward and the trim shroud at back of the finder bay had a matching scallop for the new lever design to rest upon, this appeared about late 1972. As well were changes to the spool release mechanism, where it was an improvement from a checkered friction operated surface to a more convenient flip handled method and the center posts that held the film spools lost their angled profile for a more controversial straighter angle that improved film feed accuracy, but caused some difficulty in speed of spool placement during film reloading and also to prompted some to seek services to custom grind the posts.

In 1976, to address the issue of induced camera vibrations caused by the 6×7's large mirror swing and suddenly stopping, a mirror release mechanism was introduced. By sliding upwards the mirror-up switch on the right hand side of the mirror housing, it allowed a bypass of the mirror release from the shutter trip cycle. This allowed the mirror to fully raise and then hold, allowing then the shutter release cycle still be separately at the ready. Unfortunately, this also activated the main power switch that was mechanically tied to the mirrors' main gear action and until the depressing of the shutter release to completes the exposure, the power to the circuits remain on and would drain the battery over time. Even with this one negative aspect to the mirror lock-up modification, it would still become a standard feature in later productions.

The introduction of the mirror lock-up (MLU) feature appeared at about the same time as other critical changes, as with the counter components and other key components in the advance mechanism. Pentax slowly phased out the parts compatible with the first released version, in favor of improved and more durable parts. The exhausting of parts also meant that later new production bodies had all the new parts installed at the factory and would later become standard in the 67-badged models officially by and after 1990.

Other changes were to the frame counting cam that shortened the 220 film frame count from 21 to 20 exposures, but the 120 mode otherwise remained the same. This reduction was necessary when the new version of the 'clutch' plate to improve durability was released. The change also tied to the switching from rubberized "counter roller" to an all-metal smooth version.

Lesser known for the later original 6×7 and 1990-era 67 cameras was a special factory modification that would allow the bypassing of part of the frame counter mechanism ("duality-prevention lever") for deliberate double exposures, though not many were made with this feature, and estimate of only a few hundred may exist. The camera could also be returned to a Pentax service facility to have the multiple exposure facility installed at owner's expense. That modification may often be found on some Polaroid/Foscher-equipped bodies.

Another modification was a non-powered bulb exposure. This was a popular request from astronomers that needed the camera to expose for times greater that the batteries could allow. The demand for this modification was reduced when the availability of a third-party adapter plate that could override the need for a battery, and mimic the cycle of the mirror release and shutter opening by a simple plate that employed two shutter release cables.

Polaroid back / Foscher-adapted bodies were a non-factory modification that was usually applied by authorized service centers, and was a popular enhancement used by studio photographers for lighting tests. There would be later versions of this modification to give users an ability to make both backs interchangeable. The special modification allowed switching in, out of the Foscher back, to a normal pressure plate for roll film without the need for a service technician to partially disassemble the hinge, as well as re-attaching the leatherette.

A minor change of color to the lens release lock from chrome to black is found on the 67 models (designated model number of 22401). Some reports of mixed-and-matched part factory release bodies also existed, as well as mix / match as a result of authorized servicing mandating the exchange of the older advance system for the newer version.

== Lenses and accessories ==
Pentax has one of the widest range of lenses available for a medium format camera. The first generation of lenses available had a standard multi-coating and were named "Super-Takumar." After the release of the improved 7 layer coating, they were labelled "Takumar Super-Multi-Coated". Later lenses would abandon the Takumar branding in favor of "SMC Pentax 67" and include modifications to optics, functional and cosmetics.

Most of the lenses are "auto-aperture" type to allow for the brightest viewing and focusing of the lens for composition of the subject. The lens also has an aperture tab that couples to the indexed sliding ring found under the mount ring of the body. In turn the ring has a chain connected and running up into the finder bay and linked to a tab under spring tension. Operation of the aperture ring would operate the ring and feed the chain back and forth to move an indexing tab. This was only utilized by the TTL meter prism, and was not needed for any other finder available.

The exceptions for "auto-aperture" or aperture linkage are: The 75 mm shift, due to the manner that the base must slide out of direct alignment to the forward elements that the linkages for the auto-aperture is not possible. The 120 mm Soft Focus lens due to its dual aperture system. The 600 mm and 800 mm due to their "rack and pinion" focus that it is not possible to have linkages to the auto-aperture. The 1000 mm being a catadioptric lens that it is not possible to have an aperture.

=== Leaf-shutter lenses ===
Two leaf-shutter lenses were made available. The 90 mm f/2.8 and 165 mm f/4 permitted flash sync at all speeds, thereby solving many mirror and shutter vibration problems, as well as allowing for fast shutter speeds for use with strobes and portable flashes while in bright shooting conditions where the 1/30 second synchronization speed is not ideal. Lenses are linked to the body by the operation of the aperture stop-down lever being tripped. The operation of the leaf shutter requires the camera's native focal plane sync speed of 1/8 second to be set in order to synchronise correctly with the lens leaf shutter. Mirror lock-up, on cameras so fitted with this function, can be used in leaf shutter mode with the 90 mm LS lens, but should not be used with the 165 mm due to mechanical differences with the risk of jamming and damage to the camera. With either leaf shutter lens set to LS mode, the TTL meter on the Pentax 67 will not operate.

=== Through-the-lens metering pentaprism viewfinder ===
The through-the-lens (TTL) metering pentaprism viewfinder included a knurled shutter dial ring with fitted case. The TTL-metered pentaprism is the same coverage as the non-metered pentaprism, a coverage of 90% of frame and has a sensitivity pattern of 60% center-weight and 30% inner field sensitivity. The TTL metering pentaprism has no internal power of its own, instead, the operating power comes from one of the three contacts found in the finder bay of the body as well as grounding to the body. Only two of the three contacts are used and depending on the two modes: Normal as AUTO mode and in an override to stop-down mode in the MAN mode as found on many equipped lenses. The TTL metered prism has a 5 stop exposure range.

In AUTO or automatic mode, the lens is fully opened and adjustments are read from the coupled index from the lens – through the index ring of the body mount – to the chain and index shuttle: The TTL meter receives the position information via a protruding tab facing the finder bay; that tab operates a linear potentiometer.

In MAN or manual mode, with so-equipped lenses, the sliding of the lens switch will move an internal lever that then presses down on the activating switch in the body. The switch is located inside the pin of the lens release pin. This inner pin is connected to an electrical toggle inside the body that switches the current from body-grounded to bay connector to activate the secondary circuit.

The physical difference of the TTL meter to the regular prism is the coupling arm that extends to the shutter speed dial. The dial covers the body shutter speed dial and is coupled via a spring loaded index pin. The included knurled ring assists with the operation of the shutter speed dial which is otherwise difficult to operate by itself with the prism in-situ.

The stop-down mode or direct metering while the aperture is allowed to operate and change the amount of light is similar to the MAN mode, but activates when a non-auto-aperture lens is mounted causing index ring to be positioned to place the meter's linear potentiometer into a bypass mode to activate the secondary circuit in the meter. The lens is allowed to stop-down and the light is directly measured, however, the shutter speed dial link operates the same in MAN mode.

As with the body receiving improvements over time, so did the TTL meter have some changes. Although the image coverage remained unchanged, the type of metering and the circuitry received some upgrades. CdS (cadmium sulfide) to GPD (gallium photo diode) photo cells, and a two part circuit to a single board improved response time and reliability. The early version is identified by the single marked 'On' switch and the meter needle starts from up to down and the later model has a On- and Off-marked switch and the meter needle starts from bottom to top. The later model would also have the sole "Pentax" badge by 1986.

=== Waist-level finders ===
Two waist-level finders are available; a collapsible model that compactly folds almost flush with the top of the body and a fixed or rigid finder often called the Chimney finder. Both finders provided a 100% view of the frame. A special viewfinder was available as well for the Pentax 6×7 Marine Housing for use in underwater applications. The camera can also be focused and used without any finder being present.

=== Focusing screen ===
Along with the standard micro-prism center focusing screen, four other focusing screens are available and could be refitted into the body (plain, grid, grid with micro-prism, split-image as well as the standard). Due to the fact that the installation of a screen required a qualified technician and the requirement to re-calibrate the new screen, it is rare to find screens other than the standard version. The micro-prism screen is adequate or usable down to f/4.5 lenses, however, the more useful split screen is capable of operating down to f5.6 before the center of the viewfinder becomes excessively dim.

=== Wood grip ===
Another separately available accessory is the distinctive left-hand wood grip with a "cold" accessory shoe. Many manufacturers offer accessory grips or "action grips" such as Kowa, Bronica, Mamiya, and Hasselblad. The Pentax grip is arguably an iconic accessory for the camera. It attaches to the two lugs / posts at the front of the camera and is secured by tightening a finger-operated bolt onto a stud found at center. The grip is removed by loosening and lifting the bolt to slide off in a downward direction to allow the lugs to clear the keyhole slots.

=== Quick-focus rings A & B ===
Quick-focus rings A and B were first listed in 1971 for use with the two most common diameter focusing barrels ranging from 35 mm to 200 mm.

=== Central-area eyepiece magnifier and right-angle viewing attachment ===
The central-area eyepiece magnifier (2× enlargement) and a right-angle (variable angle) viewing attachment attach to the TTL-metered or non-TTL metered prism by removing the standard knurled eyepiece fascia and screwing either of the attachments in place. The central-area eyepiece magnifier can be flipped up out of the way for unencumbered viewing of composition. Additionally, both attachments provide for variable dioptric correction, and with the optional addition of a rubber eyecup, both of these accessories can be used by eyeglass wearers.

=== Rigid bayonet hoods ===
Rigid bayonet hoods were available for many of the lenses from 45 mm to 200 mm.

=== Pentax bayonet filters ===
Pentax 6×7 lenses feature the ability to accept both standard threaded filters and also Pentax bayonet filters that are available in standard and SMC versions to fit all diameters found on almost all lenses (except those lenses with a filter fitment greater than 100 mm).

=== Clip-on hoods ===
Clip-on hoods were introduced at about the same time as the released of updated 6×7 lenses started to wear the 67 engraving. Some lenses would be provided with the hood while for others a hood was an optional accessory.

=== Cold-weather battery holder ===
A cold-weather battery holder was available from 1969 and minor changes were applied to the appearance. The cold-weather battery holder allowed the relocation of the battery by using a long cord with a dummy battery carrier and receptacle for the original battery holder to then be placed in a warm pocket to avoid battery failure due to cold.

=== Extension tubes and bellows system ===
Along with the availability macro lenses for close work, a selection of extension tubes and in both the standard bayonet and the outer bayonet were available as well. As well as a compact and convenient variable extension was also available. For more flexibility a bellows system was available as well as a slide copier accessory.

=== Marine housing ===
A Marine Housing was available for underwater use as well as a special finder which was single mirror viewer.

=== Fitted hard case ===
A fitted hard case could accommodate the body, finder and standard lens.

=== Camera trunk ===
Camera Trunk was a steamer trunk-style case that was marketed to carry two bodies and four lenses that were secured with a lockable bayonet platform. Existing examples are configured for a single body and up to three lenses and a center compartment with dividers for filters and accessories as well as a split lid arrangement with additional storage hook and loop tabbed lids.

== List of lenses ==
Listed below are current and earlier lenses (as indicated) for the cameras as of November 2011.

Legend
◊	Older/original version (pre-updated optical design).
※	Also existing as first release version, Takumar (non-SMC or pre-SMC).
†	Not usable with the SMC Pentax 67 165 mm f/4 leaf shutter lens.
‡	Only for 800 mm telephoto.
AL	Aspherical Lens
ED	¿ ?
IF	¿Lens-internal focusing?
M*	¿Macro focusing feature?

Wide-angle

SMC Pentax 67	45 mm	f/4
SMC Takumar 6×7	55 mm	f/3.5	◊ ※
SMC Pentax 6×7	55 mm	f/4	◊
SMC Pentax 67	55 mm	f/4
SMC Pentax 67	75 mm	f/2.8	AL
SMC Pentax 67	75 mm	f/4.5

Standard

SMC Pentax 67	90 mm	f/2.8
SMC Pentax 67	105 mm	f/2.4	※

Telephoto

SMC Takumar 6×7	150 mm	f/2.8	◊ ※
SMC Pentax 67	165 mm	f/2.8
SMC Takumar 6×7	200 mm	f/4	◊ ※
SMC Pentax 67	200 mm	f/4
SMC Pentax 67	300 mm	f/4	◊
SMC Pentax 67	300 mm	f/4	ED IF M*
SMC Takumar 6×7	400 mm	f/4	◊
SMC Pentax 67	400 mm	f/4	ED IF
SMC Pentax 67	500 mm	f/5.6
SMC Pentax 67	600 mm	f/4	※
SMC Pentax 6×7	800 mm	f/4	◊ ※
SMC Pentax 67	800 mm	f/6.7	ED IF
SMC Pentax 6×7	1000 mm	f/8	Mirror

Special purpose

SMC Pentax 67	Fish-Eye	35 mm	f/4.5
SMC Pentax 6×7	Shift	75 mm	f/4.5
SMC Pentax 6×7	LS	90 mm	f/2.8	(leaf shutter)
SMC Pentax 67	Macro	100 mm	f/4	SMC Life-Size Converter
SMC Pentax 67	Soft	120 mm	f/4
SMC Pentax 67	Macro	135 mm	f/4
SMC Pentax 67	LS	165 mm	f/4	(leaf shutter)

Extension tubes for macro photography

Pentax	Helicoid Extension Tube
Pentax	(Auto) Extension 1, 2, & 3
Pentax	Extension (outer) A, B

Zoom lenses

SMC Pentax 67	55–100 mm	f/4.5
SMC Pentax 67	90–180 mm	f/5.6

Teleconverters

Pentax 67	Rear Converter	1.4×	†
Pentax 67	Rear Converter	2×	†
Pentax 67	Rear Converter	T5 1.4	‡
