= 120 film =

Medium format roll film

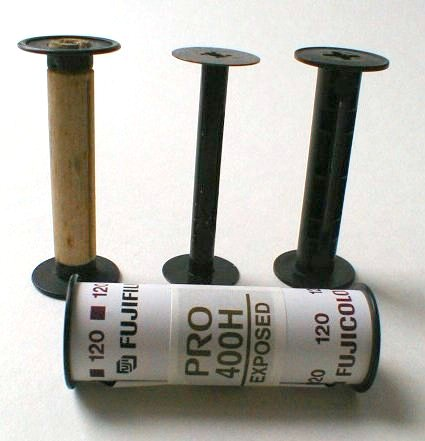
Original 120, 620 and modern 120 film spools with modern 120 exposed color film

120 is a format of photographic film. 120 is a roll film, six centimeters high and approximately 82 cm long, and is considered a "medium format". Unlike 35mm film, the size of photographs made with 120 is not universal, and is determined by which camera is used to shoot it; common sizes include 6×6, 6×4.5, 6×7 and 6×9.

120 film was introduced by Kodak for their Brownie No. 2 in 1901 and originally intended for amateur photography but was later superseded in this role by 135 film (35mm). 120 film survives to this day as the only medium format film that is readily available to both professionals and amateur enthusiasts from most major film manufacturers.

120's sister format 220, introduced in 1965, is largely the same as 120, but is twice the length. Many cameras which shoot 120 are also designed to shoot 220, although older 120 cameras that use frame number windows are unsuitable for 220, as it lacks the backing paper that 120 has.

== Characteristics ==
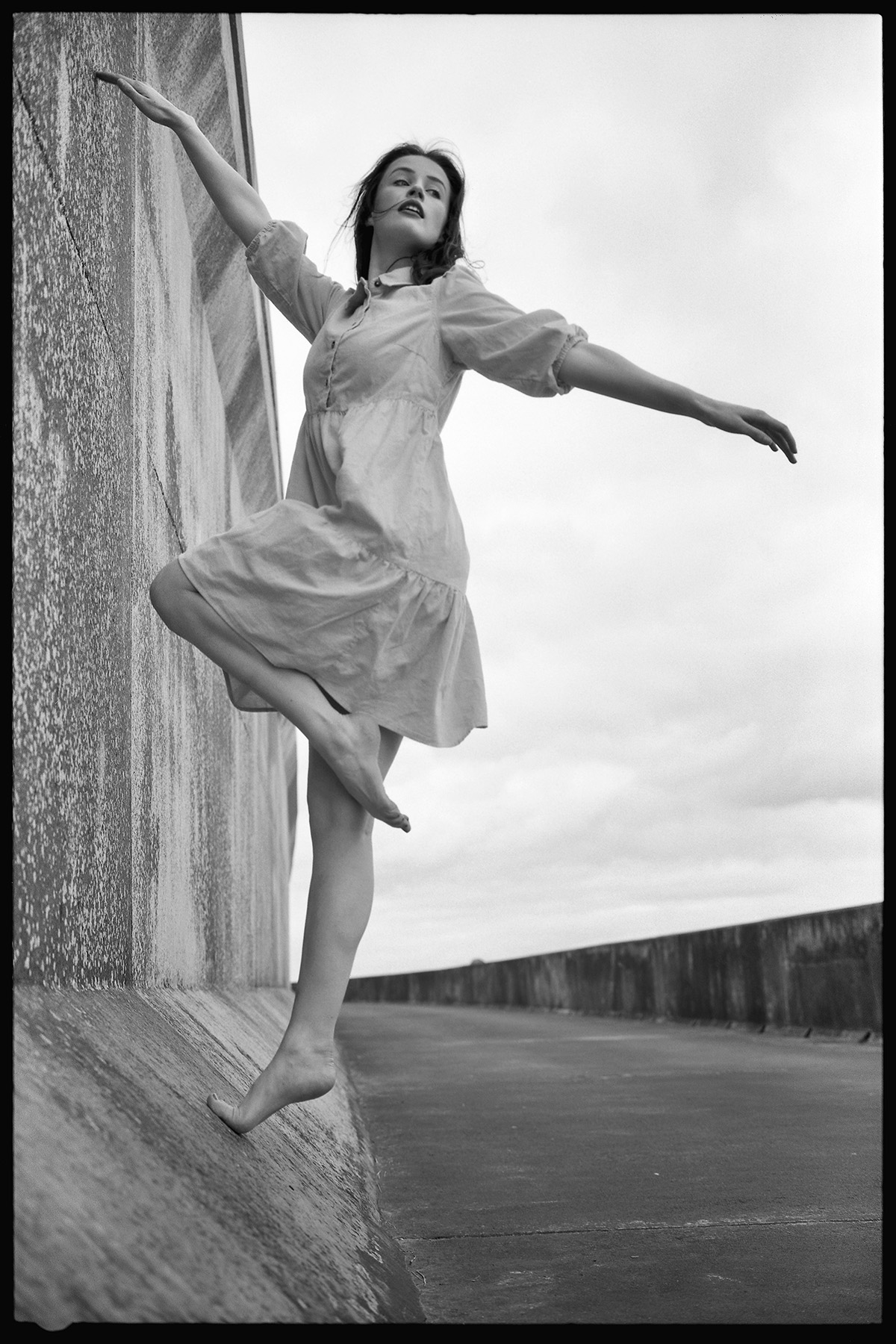
A portrait of a dancer photographed in 6X9 format on 120 film

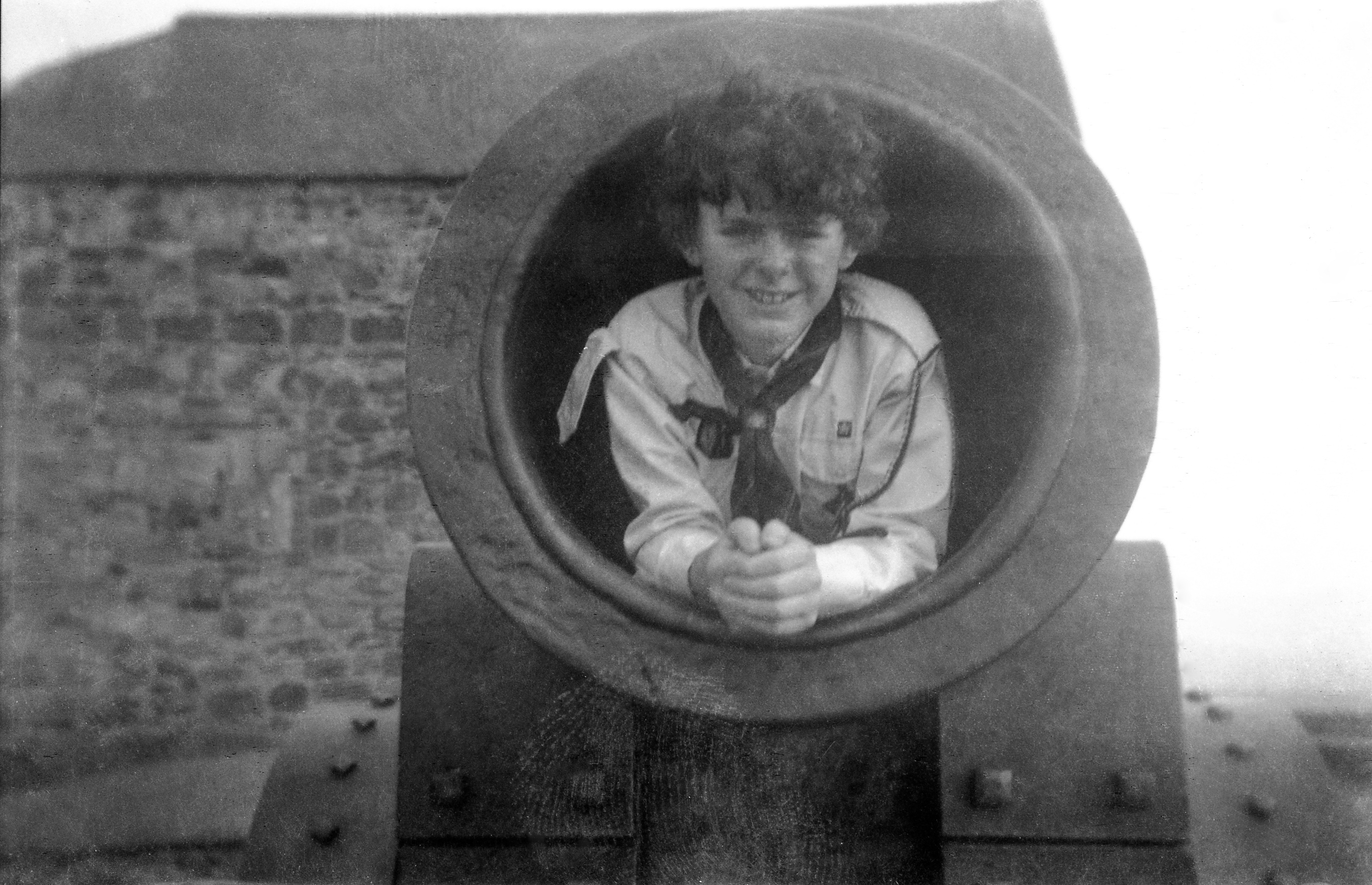
Image shot on 120 film

The 120 film format is a roll film which is nominally between 60.7 mm and 61.7 mm wide. Most modern films made today are roughly 61 mm (2.4 inches) wide. The film is held in an open spool originally made of wood with metal flanges, later with all-metal, and finally with all-plastic. The length of the film is nominally between 820 millimeters (32 in) and 850 millimeters (33 in), according to the ISO 732:2000 standard. However, some films may be as short as 760 millimeters (30 in). The film is attached to a piece of backing paper longer and slightly wider than the film. The backing paper protects the film while it is wound on the spool, with enough extra length to allow loading and unloading the roll in daylight without exposing any of the film. Frame number markings for three standard image formats (6×4.5, 6×6, and 6×9 [4:3, 1:1, and 2:3 aspect ratios]; see below) are printed on the backing paper.

The 220 format was introduced in 1965 and is the same width as 120 film, but with about double the length of film and thus twice the number of possible exposures per roll. Unlike 120 film, however, there is no backing paper behind the film itself, just a leader and a trailer. This results in a longer film on the same spool, but there are no printed frame numbers. Because of this, 220 film cannot be used in cameras that rely on reading frame numbers through a red window. Also, since the film alone is thinner than a film with a backing paper, a special pressure plate may be required to achieve optimal focus if the film is registered against its back side. Some cameras capable of using both 120 and 220 film will have a two position adjustment of the pressure plate (e.g. the Yashica-Mat 124G, Pentax 6x7, Mamiya C220 or Mamiya C330) while others will require different film backs e.g. the Pentax 645 or Kowa Six.

The specifications for 120 and 220 film are defined in the ISO 732 standard. Earlier editions of ISO 732 also provided international standards for the 127 and 620 film formats.

== Frame sizes ==
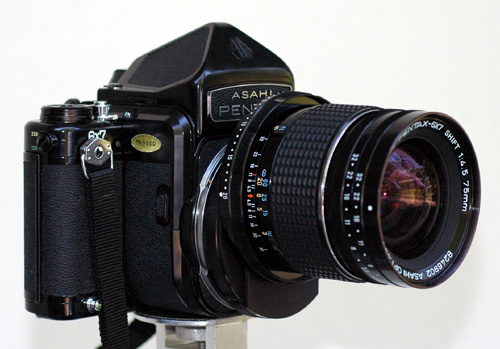
Pentax 6×7 SLR camera with perspective control lens

120 film allows several frame sizes.

120 frame sizes
Nominal size (cm)	Aspect ratio	Actual size (mm)	Exposures	
Nominal size (cm)	Aspect ratio	Actual size (mm)	120	220
6 × 4.5	1:1.35	56 × 41.5	15 or 16^{†}	30–32
6 × 6	1:1	56 × 56	12 or 13	24–27
6 × 7	1:1.25	56 × 70	10	20
6 × 8	1:1.37	56 × 77	9	19
6 × 9	1:1.50	56 × 84	8	16
6 × 12	1:2.1	56 × 118	6	12
6 × 17	1:3	56 × 168	4	9
6 × 24	1:4	56 × 224	3	6

^{†}User selectable on newer cameras, if a roll is only partially used then a "kink" may appear in the film where the roll touches rollers in a film back magazine and this may end up on a frame; this is not a problem when 15 exposures are used as the gaps between exposed frames is larger, nor if the camera is not used intermittently.

The 6×9 frame has the same aspect ratio as the standard 24×36 mm frame of 135 film. The 6×7 frame enlarges almost exactly to 8×10 inch paper, for which reason its proponents call it "ideal format". The square 6x6 format is commonly used in twin-lens reflex cameras such as the Rolleiflex. 6×4.5 is the smallest and least expensive roll-film frame size.

The wide 6×12, 6×17, and 6×24 cm frames are produced by special-purpose panoramic cameras. Most of these cameras use lenses intended for large format cameras for simplicity of construction.

Cameras using 120 film will often combine the numbers of the frame size in the name e.g. Pentax 6×7 (6×7), Fuji 617 (6×17), and many 645s (6×4.5). The number '6' in general, and the word 'six' are also commonly used in naming cameras e.g. Kiev 60 and Pentacon Six.

== Other similar 6 cm roll films ==
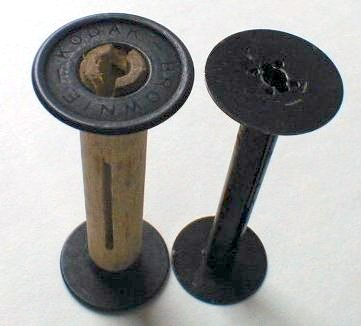
Original 120 spool (left) versus a 620 spool

The 105 format was introduced by Kodak in 1898 for their first folding camera and was the original 6×9 cm format roll film. The 117 format was introduced by Kodak in 1900 for their first Brownie camera, the No.1 Brownie, 6×6 cm format. These formats used the same width film as 120 film, but with slightly different spools. The 105 spool has a much wider flange, similar to the 116 spool, while the 117 spool's flange is slightly narrower than the 120. The 105 and 620 spools also have much thinner flanges than the 117 and 120 spools (0.635 mm (0.0250 in) vs. 1.524 mm (0.0600 in)); as a result, an unmodified 120 spool will not fit a camera designed for 105 film, such as a No. 1 Folding Pocket Kodak, as the overall length between the outside of the flanges is too long to fit the width of the film chamber.

The 620 format was introduced by Kodak in 1931 as an intended alternative to 120. Although mostly used by Kodak cameras, it became very popular. The 620 format is essentially the same film on a thinner and narrower all-metal spool (the 120 spool core was made of wood at that time):

- 105 2.509" (63.7 mm) width, 1.250" (31.8 mm) flange, 0.468" (11.9 mm) core
- 117 2.470" (62.7 mm) width, 0.875" (22.2 mm) flange, 0.468" (11.9 mm) core
- 120 2.???" width, 0.990" (25.1 mm) flange, 0.468" (11.9 mm) core
- 620 2.???" width, 0.905" (23.0 mm) flange, 0.280" (7.1 mm) core

Hence the 620 is sometimes referred to as "small hole" 6×6 or 6×9 as opposed to 120 "large hole". The 620 format was discontinued by Kodak in 1995, but it is possible to rewind 120 film onto a 620 spool in the darkroom for use in 620 cameras. According to Kodak, the narrower metal spool allowed building smaller cameras. Nonetheless the 120 format cast-metal bodied Voigtländer Perkeo remains smaller than any 620 format camera.

== See also ==
- Fujifilm 120/220 Barcode System film
- 616 film
- List of photographic film formats
- List of color film systems
- Category: Film formats
