= Battle of Charleston Harbor =

Battle of Charleston Harbor may refer to the following engagements that occurred during the American Civil War in and near Charleston Harbor near Charleston, South Carolina:

- First Battle of Charleston Harbor
- Second Battle of Charleston Harbor

== See also ==
- Battle of Charleston (disambiguation)
