= 106th Cavalry Regiment =

106th Cavalry Group
- 106th Cavalry Regiment coat of arms
- Active: 1942–1945; 2006–present
- Country: United States
- Branch: Army National Guard
- Type: Cavalry
- Role: Reconnaissance and surveillance
- Size: Regiment
- Mottos: Utcumque Ubique; Anywhere at Any Time
- Colors: yellow, red
- Equipment: Bantam jeep, M8 Greyhound, M5A1 Stuart, M24 Chaffee
- Engagements: World War II; Normandy; Rhineland; Belgium; Ardennes-Alsace; Central Europe
- Decorations: Distinguished Service Cross (1); Legion of Merit (1); Legion of Honor (1); Croix de Guerre (16); Silver Star (58); Bronze Star Medal (519)
- Battle honours: 121st CRS: Fourragère; 121st CRS: French Croix de guerre with Palm; 106th Group: French Croix de guerre with Palm

Commanders
- Notable commanders: Colonel Vennard Wilson; Colonel Paul Hastings

Insignia
- Distinctive unit insignia

The 106th Cavalry Regiment (formerly organized as a group) was a mechanized cavalry unit of the United States Army in World War II recognized for its outstanding action. The group was organized in 1921 as part of the Illinois National Guard and during the Spanish–American War and World War I was known as the 1st Regiment Illinois Volunteer Cavalry. It underwent a number of reorganizations before World War II. Like other Guard units during the inter-war years, the 106th held weekly or monthly drills and yearly training. Readiness for war in 1940 led to the mechanization of the unit and induction into federal service at Camp Livingston, Louisiana on 25 November 1940.

After the Pearl Harbor attack, the 106th trained at Camp Hood, Texas until the spring of 1944 when they deployed to Europe. Upon arriving in England, the group was reorganized into the 106th and 121st Cavalry Reconnaissance Squadrons along with a Group Headquarters. When they were moved to Europe, they were often in the lead of other units. Lightly armed, they scouted ahead to fix enemy locations. For the next year and a half, they fought through France, Belgium, Luxembourg, Germany and Austria, earning five campaign streamers and two Croix de Guerre from Charles de Gaulle, President of the Provisional French government. The regiment led the Allied advance across the Rhine and were the first unit to attack a town south of the Siegfried Line or West Wall.

In late 2006, the 33rd Brigade Combat Team of the Illinois Army National Guard was formed and the 2nd Squadron, 106th Cavalry was included in the reorganization. Through the histories of its ancestor units and a series of consolidations and reorganizations, the 106th Cavalry Regiment claims battle honors for the Spanish-American War, World War I, and campaigns in the Pacific War during World War II, in addition to service on the Western Front of World War II.

== Early history ==
The ancestor units of the present 106th Cavalry were first constituted in the Illinois National Guard in the late 1890s. Through units of the 1st Illinois Volunteer Cavalry, Troop A of the 106th Cavalry, from Pontiac, Illinois, and Troop B, from Aurora, Illinois, claim service in the Spanish-American War.

== Interwar period ==
The 106th Cavalry was constituted in the National Guard in 1921, allotted to Illinois and Michigan, and assigned to the 22nd Cavalry Division. The 1st Squadron was organized on 6 July 1922 at Detroit, Michigan, the 2nd Squadron on 20 October 1922 at Springfield, Illinois, and the regimental headquarters on 9 July 1927. The regiment was reorganized as a three-squadron regiment on 10 April 1929 by the redesignation of the 1st Squadron as the 3rd Squadron, with a new 1st Squadron organized at South Haven, Michigan and the headquarters of the 2nd Squadron relocated to Urbana, Illinois. The Illinois elements of the regiment conducted summer training at Camp Grant, while the Michigan elements trained at Camp Grayling. On 1 April 1939, the regiment was reassigned to the 23rd Cavalry Division. On 1 September 1940, the 1st and 3rd Squadrons were reorganized and redesignated the 1st Battalion, 177th Field Artillery Regiment and 2nd Battalion, 210th Coast Artillery Regiment, respectively, and relieved from the 106th. The 106th was reorganized as an entirely Illinois-based two-squadron regiment when the 23rd Reconnaissance Squadron of the 23rd Cavalry Division was redesignated and assigned as the new 1st Squadron. The regiment was relieved from the 23rd Cavalry Division on 1 October 1940 and redesignated the 106th Cavalry (Horse-Mechanized), consisting of one mounted squadron and one armored car squadron. The 106th was inducted into federal service on 25 November 1940 in Chicago. The regiment moved to Camp Livingston, Louisiana on 3 January 1941 under command of V Corps.

=== The Black Horse Troop ===
in 1929, Major General Roy D. Keehn, Adjutant General of Illinois and commander of the 33rd Division, received permission from Secretary of War Charles P. Summerall to organize the Headquarters Troop and Band, 106th Cavalry. The Headquarters Troop was federally recognized on 27 April 1929, while the Band was federally recognized on 12 June 1929. The federal government provided funds for forty-two horses, but "the troop's organizers felt that one-hundred matched black horses were required to fully equip a troop and band of this character;" businessman Samuel Insull and others raised approximately $100,000 to outfit the troop and the mounted band, and formed the "Chicago Black Horse Troop Association" to coordinate funding, organization, and operations. The troop wore a dress uniform of blue shell jackets. The troop participated in parades and ceremonies as a horse mounted unit.

== World War II ==
Along with other National Guard units, the regiment was federalized in 1940. At the beginning of World War II, most of the members of the regiment were given the opportunity to enroll in officers school. A core group of about 60 men chose to stay with the unit. The regiment was assigned to the Third Army on 12 January 1942, and to IV Corps on 1 May 1942. In spring 1942 the regiment became fully mechanized. The regiment participated in several maneuvers at Hineston, Kinisatchie, and Dry Creek, Louisiana; and in the Louisiana Maneuver Area through the beginning of November 1942.

They were assigned to XV Corps on 1 March 1943 and transferred to Burkeville, Texas, on 25 June 1943, after which it was sent to Camp Hood, Texas on 25 August 1943 under the Tank Destroyer Command. The regiment staged at Camp Shanks, New York from 20 February 1944 until 27 February when it departed the New York Port of Embarkation for England.

- Constituted: 1921.
- Activated: 25 November 1940.
- Overseas: 1943–1945.
- Campaigns: Normandy, Northern France, Rhineland, Ardennes-Alsace, Central Europe
- Days of combat: 480.
- Awards: Fourragère-1 French Croix de guerre with Palm-2, DSC-1; SS-58; BS-519.
- Commander: Colonel Vennard Wilson, (25 November 1940 – 23 October 1945).
- Casualties: KIA-194, MIA-4, Wounded-499
- Returned to U.S.: 1 October 1945.
- Inactivated: 23 October 1945.

=== Subordination ===
U.S. 1st Army, VIII Corps	27 June – 31 July 1944
U.S. 3rd Army, XV Corps	1 – 27 August 44
U.S. 3rd Army, XII Corps	28 August – 10 September 44
U.S. 7th Army, XV Corps	28 September 44 – 15 October 45

=== Campaign summary ===
The 106th served in the European campaign. The unit comprised approximately fifteen hundred men and was given various typical mechanized cavalry missions later recognized by the French nation with the award of two Croix de Guerre. The unit finished its wartime duty with the 7th Army, XV Corps.

As a forward cavalry force, the 106th provided the first American troops to enter Salzburg, Austria. The 121st Squadron of the 106th received information that the Germans were holding the King of the Belgians and his family prisoner in a chateau near Strobl, Austria. Captain Benecke, the commander of B Troop of the 121st Squadron, led some cavalrymen of his unit, including those who spoke German, on a rescue party. The group later served as Honor Guards for the King of the Belgians and his consort. The 106th secured a truce from the defending German Army on 7 May, the day before the German High Command surrendered to the Allies on 8 May 1945.

=== Organization and tactics ===
The 106th Cavalry Group's purpose was to act as the "eyes and ears" of a field army or army group, scouting ahead of slower and heavier-equipped armored and infantry formations to locate the enemy and shield friendly units from ground detection. Whenever enemy forces were found, the cavalry was designed to determine opposing size and positions using reconnaissance-by-fire tactics, and report this information to higher command. The group was too lightly armed to engage in sustained combat, and regular infantry or armor was utilized if the opposition proved beyond cavalry-group capabilities. Another routine aspect of its reconnaissance duties involved employment of the cavalry group to fill measurable gaps separating frontline Allied units. The cavalry group was also assigned missions requiring rapid movement to bypass enemy forces, if opportune weaknesses or uncovered terrain was discovered by mechanized reconnaissance methods.

=== Equipment and armament ===
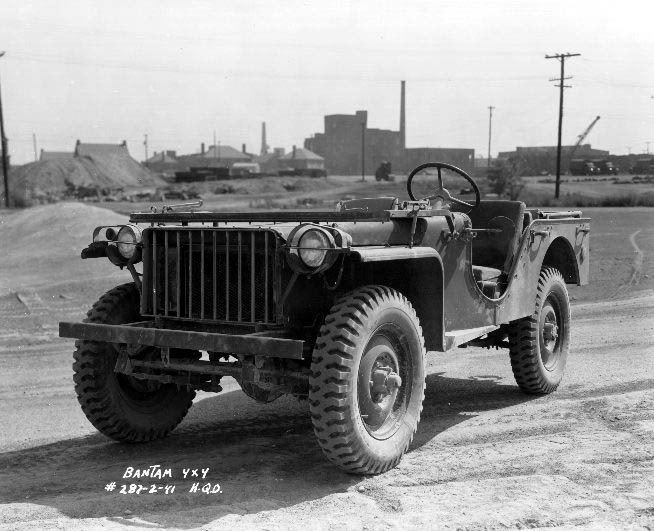
The Bantam Jeep came in many configurations. The 106th Bantam vehicles were equipped with .30 caliber machine guns or mortars.

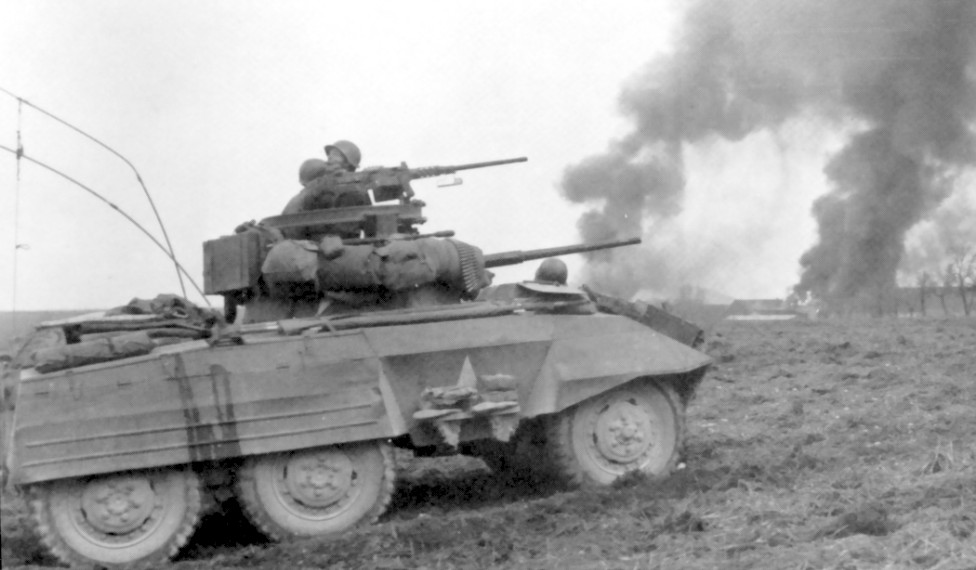
The M8 Greyhound was equipped with a 37 mm gun, three machine guns, and two powerful radios.

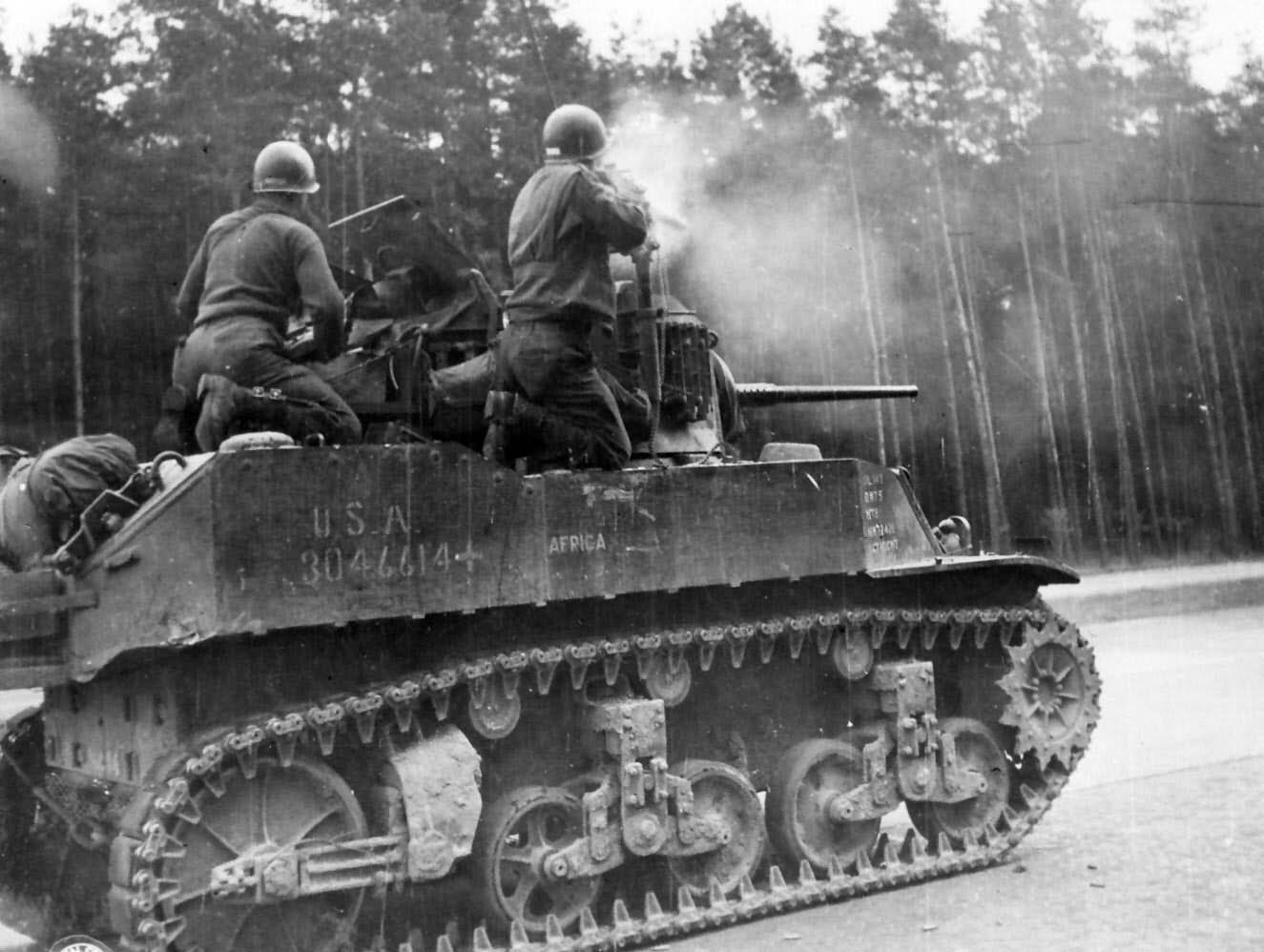
M5A1 Stuart Light Tank firing its 37 mm gun.

The 106th Cavalry was lightly equipped to allow it to move quickly and deploy rapidly. They fought mounted in mobile Bantam Jeeps and M8 armored cars. Each squadron's complement of troops and vehicles consisted of a headquarters troop that included communication, administrative, mess, maintenance, transportation, and supply support, a medical detachment, a cavalry assault gun troop, and three reconnaissance troops, lettered A, B, and C. A squadron of about 760 men was about the equivalent of a typical Army battalion in numbers, though Cavalry units were typically smaller.

The three reconnaissance troops were each equipped with Bantam jeeps with a bracket-mounted .30 caliber machine gun, manned by a soldier sitting in the front passenger seat. A second Bantam jeep was mounted with a 60mm mortar manned by two soldiers. Sometimes the Bantam was mounted with a .50 caliber machine gun. Each troop was usually equipped with a mixture of the three vehicles. To maximize speed and maneuverability on the battlefield, the Bantams were not given extra armor protection. The only modifications the 106th made was to add a wire cutter. They mounted a steel pole on the front bumper that extended above the driver's head because the Germans would sometimes stretch piano wire over roads with the intention of injuring or decapitating the driver.

The third vehicle used was the six-wheeled, lightweight M8 Greyhound armored car, mounted with a 37 mm gun in a movable turret that could swing a full 360 degrees. It also featured a .30 caliber coaxial machine gun that could move independently of the turret. The M8 was equipped with powerful FM radios to enable battlefield communications.

E Troop, the squadron's mobile artillery, was the Cavalry Assault Gun Troop and consisted of three assault gun platoons. Each platoon was equipped with assault guns, short-barreled 75 millimetres (3.0 in) howitzers in an open turret on an M8 chassis. They also utilized two halftracks to carry their headquarters unit and an ammunition section. Two gun sections used an M8 Greyhound.

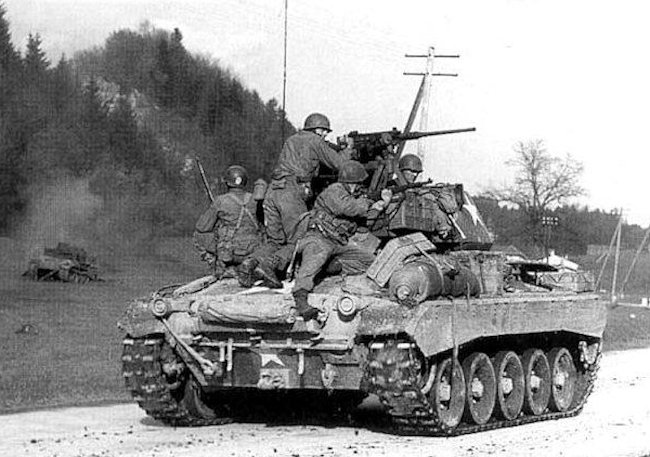
The new M24 Chaffee light tank that was issued to the 106th Cavalry in February 1945. Its 75 mm gun was vastly superior to the Stuart tank.

F Troop consisted of five light tank companies. Early in the war, each company had three light tank platoons, consisting of five 37mm M5A1 Stuart light tanks. While fast and maneuverable, the Stuart's armor plating and its cannon were soon found to be no match against the German tanks. In February 1945, they were replaced with the more heavily armed 75 mm M24 Chaffee light tank.

The M5 Stuart light tank was capable of speeds up to 36 mph (58 km/h) on the road, while the M24 Chaffee could travel at speeds up to 37 mph (60 km/h) on paved surfaces. The M8 armored car was capable of speeds of up to 50 mph (80 km/h), while the Bantams could exceed 70 miles per hour (110 km/h). The officers usually rode with their enlisted men in the Bantams, while the squadron's support troops used a variety of vehicles including the Bantams, military trucks, and armored halftracks. At times, the men would dismount from their light vehicles and take on infantry roles, digging in to create a stronger defensive line.

Patrols were undertaken both on foot or mounted as the circumstances dictated. In this capacity, the cavalrymen would go into combat with M1 rifles and carbines, hand grenades, Thompson machine guns, and newly developed bazookas. When facing heavily fortified enemy positions or, later in the war, against the heaviest German tanks, the 106th was accompanied with supporting units, usually in the form of a small number of tank destroyers. However, the mission of reconnaissance units was not to fully engage the enemy when encountered, but to summon the slower moving and better equipped infantry and armored units to take on their counterparts.

The headquarters, maintenance, mess, supply and medical units were equipped with a variety of military trucks, M8 Armored cars, halftracks, and Bantam jeeps.

== Arrival in England ==
The regiment arrived at Glasgow, Scotland on 9 March 1944, was moved to Doddington Hall camp in England, and six days later was reorganized as the HHT 106th Cavalry Group (Mechanized), comprising the 106th and 121st Cavalry Reconnaissance Squadrons along with a Group Headquarters. Half of its officers and non-commissioned soldiers formed the basis of the newly created 121st Cavalry Squadron. The 33rd Aviation Battalion of the Illinois National Guard was reorganized as Troop A. After three months of training, the 106th sailed for France on 29 June 1944. While crossing the English Channel to the Normandy beach, the squadron was transported on two Liberty ships. The U.S. James A. Ferrell, the Liberty ship carrying Troop A of the 121st Squadron, was struck by a torpedo from German U-boat 984 shortly after leaving England killing four American soldiers below deck and wounding another 45 men. Fortunately, a Red Cross LST came quickly alongside and the rest of the men were safely evacuated back to England for another 19 days before new transportation to France could be found.

== European operations ==
The cavalry group served in the European campaign and at various stages screened the advance of the US Third Army, US Seventh Army and US Sixth Army Group. The 106th as a scouting force provided the first American troops to enter Salzburg, Austria and accepted its surrender.

=== Normandy ===
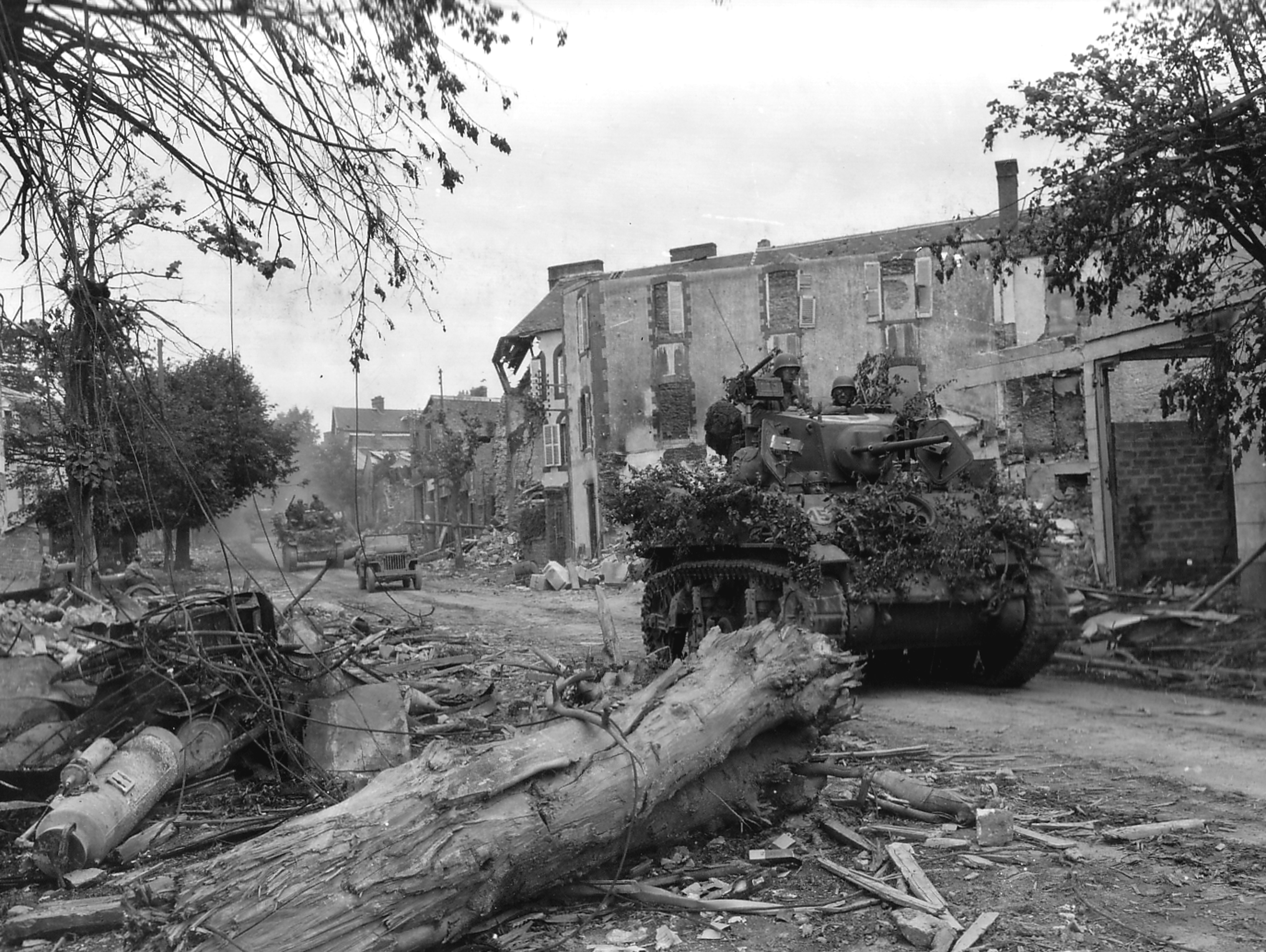
M5A1 Stuart Light Tank passes through the wrecked streets of Coutances.

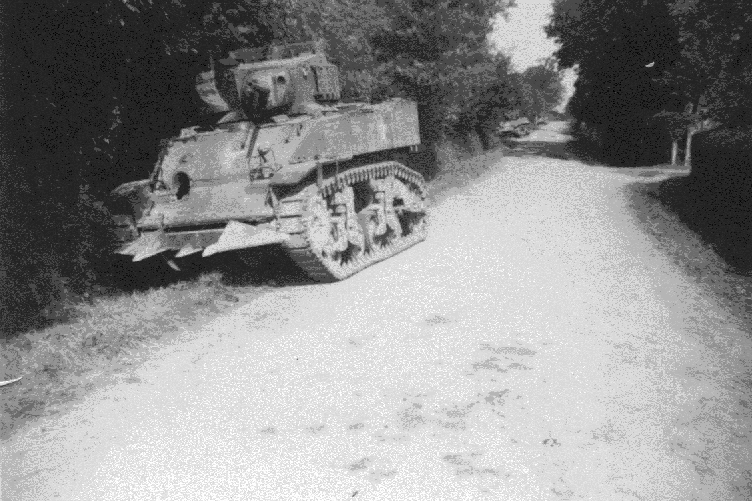
One of three tanks from the 121st Squadron of the 106th Cavalry that were put out of action by German anti-tank guns on August 6th, 1944 in Ahuille, France. One American was killed and several wounded in this action.

The 106th Cavalry Group arrived in France under the command of Colonel Vennard Wilson, a Regular Army officer. They were first committed to combat on 2 July 1944 with the VIII Corps. Its first mission was to assist in the reduction of German forces previously isolated during the VIII Corps advance in the Normandy Peninsula. The next mission was an offensive screening mission, which led from Normandy south through St. James, Isigny, La Haye-du-Puits, Manche, Basse-Normandie, Coutance, and Avranches, to Rennes. With the quick advance, gaps appeared between VIII and XV Corps, and General George S. Patton plugged the gap between Louvigne and Rennes with the 106th Cavalry Group.

When VIII Corps turned west to mop up and secure the Brittany Peninsula, the 106th Regiment was reassigned once again to XV Corps. As the XV Corps raced east towards Le Mans, the 106th provided reconnaissance and a screening force. Members of the 106th were among the first to enter Le Mans on 8 August. The German front in the Battle of Normandy had collapsed, and the XV Corps turned north to help close the Falaise Pocket and the 106th provided flank screening security.

=== Northern France ===
The XV Corps then turned north towards the Seine and Paris. With the pocket closed, the 106th reconnoitered east through Alençon, Sarthe, Nogent, and Mantes-Gassicourt. On 15 August they covered the 50-mile (80 km) to Dreux, just west of Paris, in a single day. They remained there covering the XV Corps' flank until 27 August. This mission helped protect XV Corps against German remnants attempting to escape the Falaise Pocket. The advance east from Auxerre to Gondrecourt was very fast against diminishing German resistance. Their screening mission took them along a 90-mile (140 km) front from the left to the right flank of the Third Army.

The group was then transferred under the command of and assigned to protect the right flank of XII Corps for twelve days carrying out reconnaissance as that corps advanced east. In mid-September it was reassigned to XV Corps at Joinville. This marked a two-month and 400-mile (640 km) trek across France as they moved in to protect the right flank of U.S. Third Army during their rapid advance from Joinville au Marne to Charmes au Moselle. During this advance, the 106th along with the 2nd French Armored Division assisted in eradicating the effective combat power of the German 16th Infantry Division.

The 106th's commanding officer, Colonel Vennard Wilson, later described the unit's action:

We used five of our six troops to contain those Germans, slipped around to their north, delivered our infantry on their objective at five in the afternoon after a fifty-mile advance. I wish to pay special tribute to B Troop 106th Squadron and their gallant troop commander, Captain Park, in this operation. This troop was one hundred miles in rear of us when the advance was ordered, came up during the night, arrived at the starting point after the other troops had departed, kept moving as rear troop during the day, and were sent into action late in the afternoon after I had committed the five other troops. Captain Park used one of his platoons on side blocking and reconnaissance missions, and when I arrived at Charmes we had only Captain Park, two platoons, and a platoon of tanks. It was enough to do the job.

=== Eastern France ===
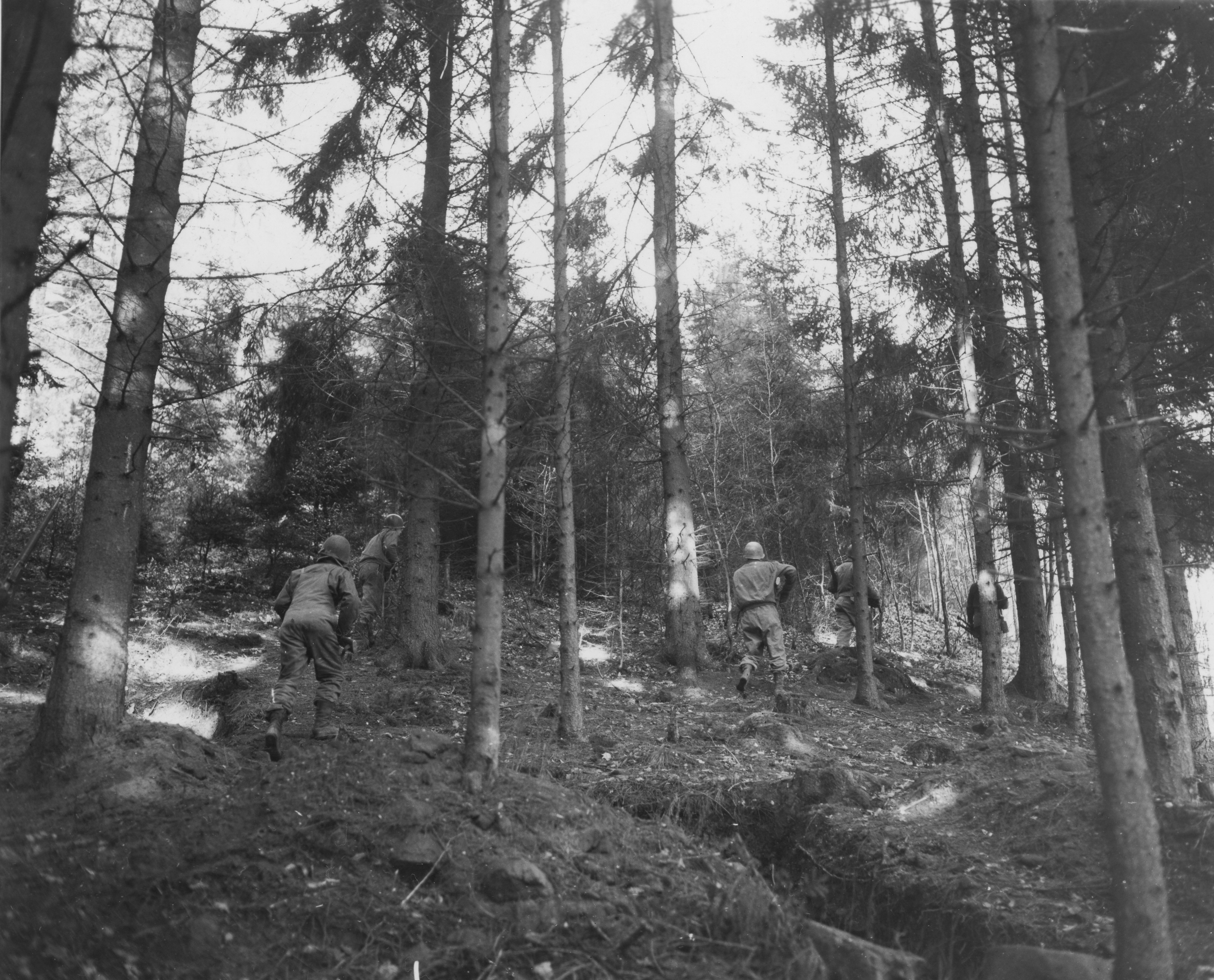
A combat patrol of 1st Platoon, B Troop, 106th Squadron in the woods near the town of Eguelshardt. 17 December, 1944.

In late September, the U.S. Army transferred the XV Corps from General Patton's Third Army, 12th Army Group to Seventh Army, 6th Army Group. Reassigned with the XV Corps, the 106th—without moving positions—switched from guarding the Third Army's right flank to guarding the Seventh Army's left flank and maintaining contact between the Third and Seventh Armies.

The 106th was then tasked with reconnaissance in front of the XV Corps. They led the XV Corps from the Moselle River to Lunéville, and supported by the 813th Tank Destroyer Battalion, attacked northeast into the Forêt de Parroy, northeast of Lunéville, France. For two months they fought as infantrymen, dismounted alongside the 79th and 44th Infantry Divisions, enduring winter weather and minefields. Major General Wade H. Haislip characterized Forêt de Parroy as being "in reality a jungle."

During what was said to be the worst winter in 30 years, the 1500 men of the 106th held up to 125-mile (201 km) of the front. Staying in contact with the XII Corps right flank to its north was difficult because its lines were so thinly spread. Maintaining relatively static lines from 20 September through 5 November, they took the opportunity to rotate the two squadrons in and out of the line as trench foot took its toll on the soldiers. On several occasions the 106th was ordered to counter German probing attacks. The 121st Cavalry Squadron was later awarded the Croix de Guerre with Palm for its combat participation during this extended period.

When the XV Corps' infantry attacked the German defensive line, the 106th, once again supported by the 813th Tank Destroyer Battalion, preceded the 2nd French Armored Division in maneuvering through the Vosges Mountains to within 1-mile (1.6 km) of the Rhine River. The 106th screened the north advance, leading the attack on Sarrebourg and then advancing 16-mile (26 km) to the east to seize the Saverne Gap. Once through the Gap, the 106th guarded the northwest flank near Sarrebourg as the rest of the Corps advanced east another 33 miles (53 km) to capture Strasbourg.

On the American's Thanksgiving Day, 23 November 1944, one of the most élite units in the entire German army, the well-rested and refitted Panzer-Lehr-Division counterattacked, trying to recapture the Saverne Gap and cut off the XV Corps from its supply lines. The 106th was forced back (militarily credited with the usual propaganda of "completing a brilliant delaying action") but the retreat gave XV Corps Commander Major General Wade H. Haislip enough time to reinforce and the counter German advance.

Two weeks later, on 16 December 1944, the Germans launched the Ardennes Offensive (Battle of the Bulge). The 106th was placed in a dismounted (infantry) patrol mode north of Sarrebourg to scout German forces.

On 23 December the Group relieved the 6th Cavalry Group of Third Army in its zone to the north. The 106th Squadron relieved the 28th Squadron near St. Avold and the 121st Squadron relieved the 6th Squadron near Freyming-Merlebach. The 106th Cavalry Group maintained position on the shoulder of the bulge, helping maintain contact with Third Army and check the German attack.

=== Operation Nordwind ===
As the Ardennes Offensive faltered, the Germans launched Operation Nordwind in the Alsace just before midnight on New Year's Eve to try to relieve pressure on its troops in the Ardennes. They once again sought to recapture the Saverne Gap and join up with the German 19th Army, enveloping seven American divisions along the Rhine River. The Germans attacked the right center of the regiment and the group temporarily withdrew. The bitterly cold winter weather made fighting more difficult, but the 106th finally forced the Germans to retreat.

When Nordwind was stopped on 28 January 1945, the Seventh Army and the French First Army resumed the offensive the following day. The 106th continued to patrol until 11 February 1945, when it was relieved by the 101st Cavalry Group. The regiment moved outside of Merlebach for rest, refitting, and equipment maintenance. They were outfitted with the new M-24 'Chaffee' light tank with its improved 75 mm gun mount, a huge improvement over the M5A1's 37 mm gun. Upon receiving the tanks in mid-February 1945, soldiers said, "The light tank companies of both squadrons turned in their 37 mm gun-toting M5A1's and drew the new M24's Armed with a 75 mm cannon and twice the size of the precursors, these tanks seemed beautiful to us. Our tankers itched to try them out. On 15 March, they got their chance. We were back in the line."

=== Rhineland ===
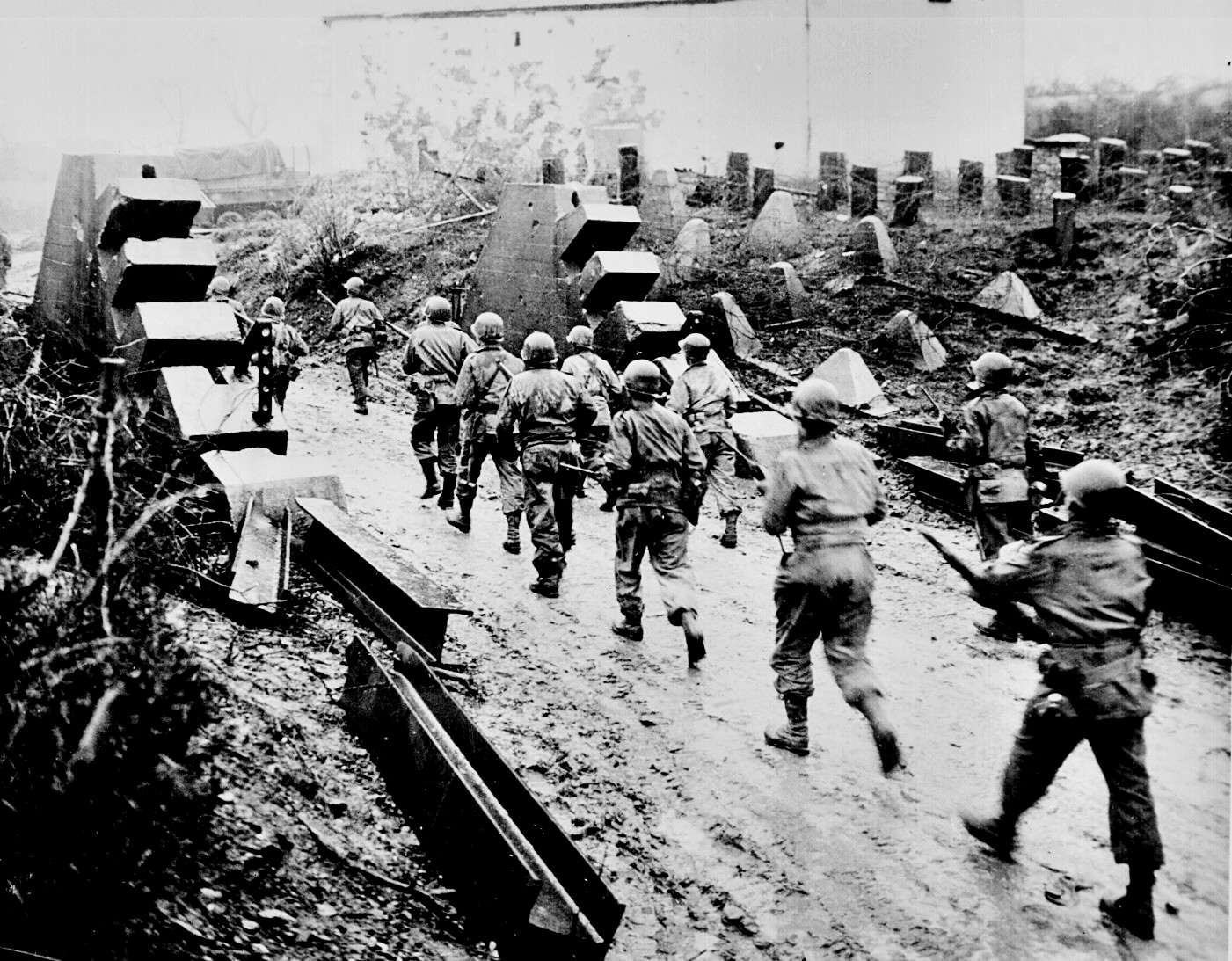
American soldiers cross the West Wall or Siegfried Line.

After just over a month's break, the 106th Cavalry Group returned to the front lines. From 15 to 26 March it led XV Corps' offensive through the Siegfried Line near Saarbrücken. Leading the advance across the Rhine were A and B Troops of the 121st Squadron, the first to attack a town south of the West Wall. Finally reaching the Rhine River, on 27 March 1945 the 106th crossed the river and cleared and secured Salzbach. The Group then covered the advance of XV Corps to Aschaffenburg am Main. The 106th secured the Corps' left flank and maintained contact with the 44th and 45th Infantry Divisions and the 2nd Cavalry Division.

From 1 to 5 April, the regiment assisted the 2nd Cavalry Group, advancing north to Bad Orb, Germany, and secured an Allied Prisoner of War camp. The regiment's 121st Squadron was then charged with reconnoitering the main road to Neustadt.

In the next eight days, the group moved northeast into Germany, rapidly cleared the towns of Alsberg, Siedensroth, Steinau, Schlüchtern and Flieden. From 5 to 13 April, the regiment cleared the enemy eastward to the Main River, a tributary of the Rhine River, covering the advance of the 45th Infantry Division into Lauda-Königshofen and then on 20 April the capture of Nuremberg.

On 21 April A Troop of the 106th Squadron was charged with leading the 2nd Battalion, 179th Infantry Regiment, 5th Infantry Division about 160-mile (260 km) south to the Danube River, and to secure and hold a crossing near Neuberg.

During the next two days, the 106th Cavalry Group fought its final major engagement. From Neuberg, the unit attacked southward towards Augsburg. Leading the 45th Infantry Division rapidly east 60 kilometres (37 mi) down the autobahn towards Munich as it tried to locate the rapidly retreating Germans, Troop C along with two light tanks from Company F, drew a concentrated attack from German forces only 5.6-mile (9.0 km) from their objective. The German self-propelled guns, tanks, and small arms fire left four dead and destroyed four armored M8 vehicles and four Bantams.

On 29 April, during the assault towards Munich, the 3rd Battalion, 157th Infantry Regiment, 45th Division liberated the Dachau Concentration Camp. The 45th Infantry Division for which the 106th had reconnoitered for several months, battled diehard Nazi troops and took Munich on 30 April 1945. After helping to capture Munich, the 106th lead the XV Corps into Austria. On 2 May, they received orders to capture Salzburg. En route, they captured the remnants of the Hungarian 9th Infantry Brigade, about 8,800 men, who were retreating eastward, fighting the advancing Soviet Marshal Rodion Malinovsky's 2nd Ukrainian Front. Salzburg surrendered on 4 May, and the local German commander offered a truce.

=== Austria ===
The group's final mission involved the release of the King of the Belgians. Held in internal exile by the Germans since his small nation had withstood a German attack for three weeks in May 1940, German-speaking members of a small recon party from B Troop, 121st Squadron of the 106th learned while searching the towns of St. Wolfgang and Strobl that King Leopold was under guard in a villa in Strobl. Travelling in a six-wheeled Mercedes previously owned by Germany's Foreign Minister Von Ribbentrop, the troopers located the villa. The SS Guards were still present, however when the Americans Arrived the German Guards Immediately dropped their weapons and surrendered without a fight and the troopers disarmed them without any resistance, freeing King Leopold. The King and his family later awarded the officers with medals of the Order of Leopold II and addressed them at an awards ceremony.

== Decorations ==
Croix de guerre 1939–1945
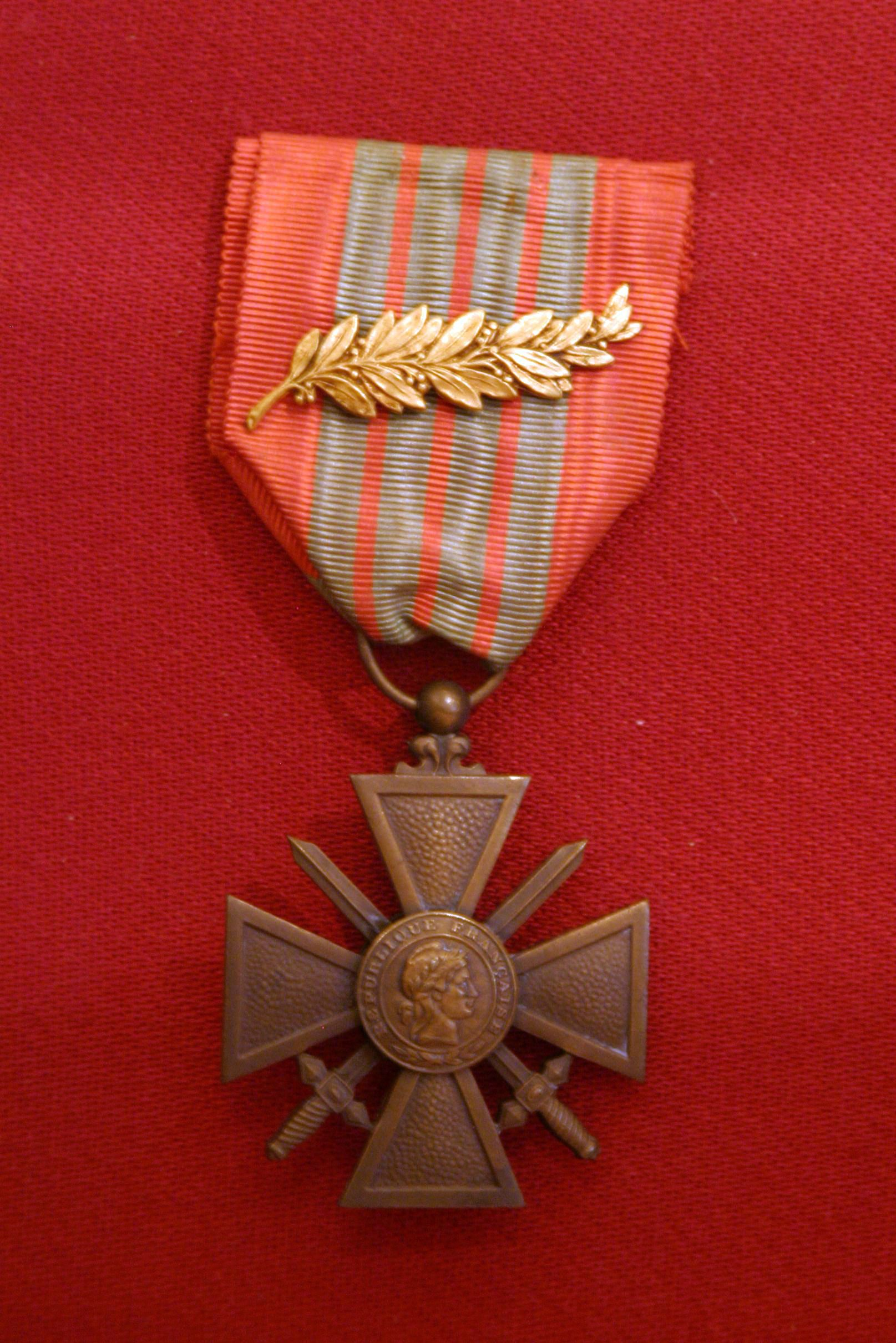
- French Croix de guerre of World War II with one gilt palm
- Type: Medal
- Awarded for: Military duty during World War II mentioned in Despatches
- Presented by: France

Colonel Vennard Wilson was awarded the Legion of Merit, Legion of Honor, and Croix de Guerre for his outstanding leadership of this unit. Lieutenant Benjamin S. Hill, C Troop, 121st Squadron, was posthumously awarded the Distinguished Service Cross.

The 121st Cavalry Squadron was awarded the Fourragère. For its action at Lunéville, the 121st Cavalry Squadron was recognized with the Croix de Guerre with Palm, and the Croix de guerre with Palm was awarded to entire 106th Cavalry Regiment for their gallantry and action at Caen-Falaise.

General Juin, Chief of the Free French General Staff, later Marshall of France, wrote the citation, awarding the Croix de Guerre, with palm (order countersigned by Charles de Gaulle) which praised the 106th Cavalry Group's action fighting alongside the 2nd French Division into the Vosges Mountains:

A magnificent Regiment, whose brilliant achievements, during the time in which it fought with and in support of the 2nd French Armored Division, from 20 August 1944 to 10 February 1945, command the highest admiration.

This Regiment conducted aggressive and extended reconnaissance form east of the Mouldre towards Crespierres as far as the Moselle at Charmes, where it established and held a bridgehead without reinforcements; then near Luneville and Baccarat engaged in protective and advanced guard missions, first at Andelot, then from the Marne to the Moselle. In the Mortagne sector, the Regiment seized the town of Mont, overran Voucourt, and reached the line Emmersviller-Geislautern-Wadgassen, where it held stubbornly in the face of the strong German counter-attacks of 31 December 1944 and of 1 January 1945.

== Kappelman photographic collection ==
T/5 Glenn Kappelman was among replacements who joined the unit on 1 February 1944, and he was able to take about 750 pictures of the unit's action during the remainder of the war. Against orders, Kapplelman had secreted a Kodak 616 camera in his gas mask during embarkation inspection in New York. Because he was a common soldier and not a professional photographer, and since cameras and film were rare among troops in combat, the photographs depict a soldier's everyday experience and are relatively unique among war photography.

Traveling in an M8 armored car, he stashed film in empty ammunition boxes, shooting nearly 100 rolls of film. On one occasion during the winter of 1945 near Lunéville, his M8 was damaged and his squadron was forced to hastily retreat. Unable to carry his boxes of film, he hid them in a nearby home under a table covered by a long tablecloth. He returned two days later to find the ammunition boxes undisturbed.

Fifty years later, he began to produce large format prints of selected images and donated copies to the United States Cavalry Museum at Ft. Riley, Kansas, and other collections. He also gave a set to the King of Belgium who had been 15 years old when he was rescued by Kappelman's unit from German captivity in 1945. Kappelman and fellow 106th veteran Art Barkis narrated a largely self-financed video documentary titled Through My Sights: A Gunner's View of WWII of the photographic collection in 1999. In 2003 he followed that with a book of the same name featuring a large number of the photos interspersed with his personal recollections 50 years later, along with excerpts from his wartime letters and diaries.

Kappelman reprinted the unit's 1945 history, "The 106th Cavalry Group in Europe 1944-1945" in 1999. He added additional information to the captions of some photographs.

== Occupation duty ==
The 106th remained in Austria as an occupation force until October 1945. Part of their responsibility was acting as an Honor Guard for King Leopold. The King was at the time a controversial figure because of his stand during the war and refusal to flee and set up a government in exile, but surrendered to the Germans. The 106th was billeted in Pension Appesbach next door to the King's chateau. They assisted with Military Police duties but otherwise relaxed, playing sports, swimming, boating, and sightseeing. Ironically, one member of B Troop, T/5 Myron Ricketts, having survived the war, died in a drowning accident during occupation duties.

In a speech to the Cavalry Group on Memorial Day, 30 May 1945, commanding officer Colonel Vennard Wilson described the Group's and specifically Troop B's accomplishments:

Our regiment, approximately fifteen hundred men, rather small as a major combat unit, has carried its full share of the action from Normandy to Austria. We landed in Normandy on 2 July 1944, learned combat in the famous hedgerow fighting there, learned to make swift advances in the initial breakthrough to Avranches. Then came our first open runs, from Avranches to the Seine. We were ready, and took up the gallop for fifty- and sixty-mile runs, leading the pack all the way. When the Third Army paused for supplies, we covered its right flank for a length of one hundred and fifteen miles.

The advance began again and we were told to lead the XV Corps from the vicinity of Neufchateau to Charmes. That, from a tactical standpoint, was one of the most interesting and successful of our accomplishments. An entire German division—the 16th Infantry Division—was in front of us. Our communications and technique were then developed to such a high standard that our infantry following us hardly lost an hour.

We used five of our six troops to contain those Germans, slipped around to their north, delivered our infantry on their objective at five in the afternoon after a fifty-mile advance. I wish to pay special tribute to B Troop 106th Squadron and their gallant troop commander, Captain Park, in this operation. This troop was one hundred miles in rear of us when the advance was ordered, came up during the night, arrived at the starting point after the other troops had departed, kept moving as rear troop during the day, and were sent into action late in the afternoon after I had committed the five other troops. Captain Park used one of his platoons on side blocking and reconnaissance missions, and when I arrived at Charmes we had only Captain Park, two platoons, and a platoon of tanks. It was enough to do the job.

== Post World War II ==
The 106th Cavalry Regiment finished the war at Wolfgang am See, Austria, as part of the Allied occupying forces. Duty was comparatively light during the spring and summer of 1945, and the 106th contributed soldiers to the multi-national military police forces that patrolled Salzburg. The remainder of the unit departed Austria for New York, United States on 1 October 1945 and was inactivated in Urbana, Illinois on 24 October 1945. In 1952 Companies A and C of the 106th Tank Battalion were headquartered at Camp Lincoln in Illinois.

== Modern era ==
The unit was reorganized on 1 February 1968 to consist of Troop E, an element of the 33d Infantry Brigade. Troop E 106 Cavalry was constituted as a scout element for the 33rd Separate Infantry Brigade, in Streator, Illinois, as a unit of the Illinois Army National Guard. The unit won several best unit citations during annual training with the 33rd Separate Infantry Brigade in the late 1980s. It served with distinction during a call up for Mississippi River floods in 1993. It was deactivated in 1995 and reconstituted as an air defense artillery unit.

In late 2006, the 33rd Brigade Combat Team of the Illinois Army National Guard was formed. A, B, and C Troops of 106th Cavalry Squadron along with its Headquarters Troop were included in the reorganization, forming the 33rd's Reconnaissance, Surveillance, and Target Acquisition squadron. Like their predecessors, they are responsible for reconnaissance, engaging the enemy with scout vehicles and anti-armor weapons, identifying and reporting enemy locations and activity, and providing enemy targeting information.

On 2 and 16 August 2008, about 100 Soldiers of the Headquarters and Headquarters Troop and Troop C, 2nd Squadron, 106th Cavalry were honored in a deployment ceremony prior to their deployment in support of Operation Enduring Freedom, to Afghanistan. As part of the 33rd Infantry Brigade Combat Team, they acted as mentor teams. They trained both the Afghan Army and Afghan National Police, conducting patrol and security missions. This deployment was a part of Combined Joint Task Force Phoenix VIII.

== Current organization ==
The squadron currently consists of a Headquarters and Headquarters Troop and three cavalry Troops and is supported by Delta Company, 634th Brigade Support Battalion:

- Headquarters and Headquarters Troop (HHT), 2nd Squadron 106th Cavalry (2-106th Cavalry): Kewanee, IL
- A Troop, 2nd Squadron 106th Cavalry (A-2-106th Cavalry): Pontiac, IL
- B Troop, 2nd Squadron 106th Cavalry (B-2-106th Cavalry): Dixon, IL
- C Troop, 2nd Squadron 106th Cavalry (C-2-106th Cavalry): Aurora, IL
- D Company, 634th Brigade Support Battalion (D-634th BSB): Galva, IL

== Notable personnel ==
- Alexander Patch
- Vennard Wilson, commanding officer, later Brigadier General and Assistant Division Commander, 25th Infantry Division
- James H. Polk, squadron commander, later regimental executive officer, and Commander in Chief, United States Army Europe from 1967 to 1971.

== Heraldry and colors ==
=== Coat of arms ===
Blazon

Shield Per fess dovetailed Or and Gules, in base four fleurs-de-lis, three and one, of the first.

Crest That for the regiments and separate battalions of the Illinois Army National Guard: On a wreath of the colors Or and Gules upon a grassy field the blockhouse of old Fort Dearborn, Proper.

Motto UTCUMQUE UBIQUE (Anywhere At Any Time).

Symbolism

Shield The shield is divided per fess dovetailed Or and Gules (yellow and red), denoting that the organization has served as Artillery as well as Cavalry. Red and yellow, being the Spanish colors, also indicate Spanish–American War service within the continental limits of the United States. The fleurs-de-lis on the red portion symbolize the combat operations of the organization in Europe during World War I and World War II.

Crest The crest is that of the Illinois Army National Guard.

Background

The coat of arms was originally approved for the 106th Cavalry Regiment, Illinois and Michigan National Guard on 17 December 1930. The description wording was modified on 30 December 1932 to show the unit's correct period of service on the Mexican Border. The unit was redesignated as the 106th Heavy Tank Battalion, Illinois and Michigan National Guard on 3 October 1949. The shield was amended to delete the crest for organizations of the Michigan National Guard on 6 October 1949. Four years later, on 19 October 1953 the unit was redesignated as the 106th Tank Battalion, Illinois National Guard. The insignia was redesignated for the 106th Armor Regiment, Illinois National Guard on 13 December 1960. It was redesignated once again as the 106th Cavalry Regiment, Illinois Army National Guard on 7 January 1965. It was amended to change the symbolism of the shield of the coat of arms on 7 October 1969.

=== Distinctive unit insignia ===
The unit device is a gold-colored metal and enamel device 1 1/32 inches (2.62 cm) in height overall consisting of a shield blazoned: Per fess dovetailed Or and Gules, in base four fleurs-de-lis, three and one, of the first.

The shield is divided per fess dovetailed Or and Gules (yellow and red), denoting that the organization has served as Artillery as well as Cavalry. Red and yellow, being the Spanish colors, also indicate Spanish–American War service within the continental limits of the United States. The fleurs-de-lis on the red portion symbolize the combat operations of the organization in Europe during World War I and World War II.

== Full lineage and honors ==
- Parent unit constituted 1 July 1897 in the Illinois National Guard as a squadron of cavalry and organized from existing units
- Expanded, reorganized, and mustered into federal service 21 May 1898 at Springfield as the 1st Illinois Volunteer Cavalry. Mustered out of federal service 11 October 1898 at Fort Sheridan, Illinois
- Reorganized in 1899 in the Illinois National Guard as a squadron of cavalry. Expanded, reorganized, and redesignated 22 June 1899 as the 1st Cavalry
- Mustered into federal service 27 June 1916 at Springfield; mustered out of Federal service 17 November 1916 at Fort Sheridan, Illinois. Chicago elements converted, reorganized, and redesignated 9 June 1917 as the 2nd Field Artillery, while the remainder of the squadron was converted, reorganized, and redesignated as the 3rd Field Artillery (hereafter separate lineage)
- 2nd Field Artillery drafted into federal service 5 August 1917. Reorganized and redesignated 21 September 1917 as the 122d Field Artillery and assigned to the 33d Division. Demobilized 7-8 June 1919 at Camp Grant, Illinois
- Reorganized 20 August 1919 in the Illinois National Guard as the 1st Field Artillery, with headquarters federally recognized 11 November 1921 at Chicago. Redesignated 13 December 1921 as the 122nd Field Artillery and assigned to the 33d Division
- Inducted into federal service 5 March 1941 at Chicago. 2nd Battalion, 122nd Field Artillery, reorganized and redesignated 12 February 1942 as the 210th Field Artillery Battalion, an element of the 33rd Infantry Division. Remainder of regiment, hereafter separate lineage. 210th Field Artillery Battalion inactivated 5 February 1946 in Japan.
- Reorganized and federally recognized 18 December 1946 in the Illinois National Guard at Chicago as the 210th Field Artillery Battalion. Converted, reorganized, and redesignated 28 February 1954 as the 248th Antiaircraft Artillery Battalion and relieved from assignment to the 33rd Infantry Division.
- Reorganized and redesignated 15 February 1958 as the 248th Missile Battalion. Consolidated 1 March 1959 with the 698th Missile Battalion (see Annex 1) and consolidated unit designated as the 202nd Artillery, a parent regiment under the Combat Arms Regimental System, to consist of the 1st and 2nd Missile Battalions.
- Consolidated 1 April 1963 with Headquarters and Headquarters Battery, 202nd Artillery Group (see Annex 1), and consolidated unit designated as the 202nd Artillery.
- Reorganized 8 October 1963 to consist of the 1st Missile Battalion. Reorganized 1 January 1966 to consist of the 1st Battalion. Redesignated 1 April 1972 as the 202nd Air Defense Artillery. Federal recognition withdrawn 30 September 1974.
- Reconstituted 26 October 1994 in the Illinois Army National Guard and consolidated with the 202nd Air Defense Artillery (see Annex 2). Consolidated unit designated as the 202nd Air Defense Artillery, to consist of the 1st Battalion, an element of the 34th Infantry Division, and the 2nd Battalion, an element of the 35th Infantry Division.
- Reorganized 1 September 1999 to consist of the 1st Battalion, an element of the 34th Infantry Division, the 2nd Battalion, an element of the 35th Infantry Division, and Batteries E, F, and G.
- Redesignated 1 October 2005 as the 202nd Air Defense Artillery Regiment. Converted, reorganized, and redesignated 1 September 2006 as the 106th Cavalry Regiment, a parent regiment under the United States Army Regimental System, to consist of the 2d Squadron, an element of the 33d Infantry Brigade Combat Team.
- Ordered into active federal service 2 October 2008 at home stations. Released from active federal service 5 November 2009 and reverted to state control.

=== Annex 1 ===
- Organized 1 October 1920 in the Illinois National Guard at Chicago as the 6th Infantry. Converted and redesignated 19 March 1921 as the 1st Artillery, Coast Artillery Corps, and organized as a provisional battalion.
- Redesignated 13 December 1921 as the Provisional Battalion, 202nd Artillery (Coast Artillery Corps). Expanded and redesignated 26 August 1924 as the 202nd Coast Artillery.
- Inducted into Federal service 16 September 1940 at Chicago. Regiment broken up 10 September 1942 and its elements reorganized and redesignated as follows:
  - Headquarters and Headquarters Battery as Headquarters and Headquarters Battery, 202nd Antiaircraft Artillery Group
  - 1st Battalion as the 768th Antiaircraft Artillery Gun Battalion
  - 2nd Battalion as the 396th Antiaircraft Artillery Automatic Weapons Battalion
  - 3rd Battalion as the 242nd Antiaircraft Artillery Searchlight Battalion
- After 10 September 1943 the above units underwent changes as follows:
  - Headquarters and Headquarters Battery, 202nd Antiaircraft Artillery Group, inactivated 17 November 1944 at Camp Howze, Texas. Reorganized and federally recognized 6 December 1946 in the Illinois National Guard at Chicago. Federal recognition withdrawn 1 August 1951. Reorganized and federally recognized 26 August 1954 in the Illinois Army National Guard at Chicago as Headquarters and Headquarters Battery, 202nd Antiaircraft Artillery Group. Reorganized and redesignated 1 May 1960 as Headquarters and Headquarters Battery, 202nd Artillery Group.
  - 768th Antiaircraft Artillery Gun Battalion (less Battery C) inactivated 3 February 1945 at Camp Earle, Alaska (Battery C redesignated 1 May 1945 as the 434th Antiaircraft Artillery Gun Battery; inactivated 10 January 1946 at Fort Lawton, Washington). Reorganized and federally recognized 13 December 1948 in the Illinois Army National Guard at Chicago as the 768th Antiaircraft Gun Battalion. Ordered into active federal service 15 May 1951 at Chicago; released from active Federal service 14 April 1953 and reverted to state control. Redesignated 1 October 1953 as the 768th Antiaircraft Artillery Battalion. Consolidated 16 March 1954 with the 121st Tank Battalion (see Annex 3) and consolidated unit designated as the 768th Antiaircraft Artillery Battalion.
  - 396th Antiaircraft Artillery Automatic Weapons Battalion inactivated 7 December 1944-9 January 1945 at Camp Livingston, Louisiana. Reorganized and Federally recognized 13 December 1946 in the Illinois National Guard at Chicago as the 693rd Antiaircraft Artillery Automatic Weapons Battalion. Redesignated 12 May 1949 as the 133d Antiaircraft Artillery Automatic Weapons Battalion. Redesignated 1 October 1953 as the 133d Antiaircraft Artillery Battalion (hereafter separate lineage)
  - 242nd Antiaircraft Artillery Searchlight Battalion inactivated 23 June 1944 at Camp Van Dorn, Mississippi. Disbanded 26 June 1944. Reconstituted 27 May 1946 in the Illinois National Guard as the 242nd Antiaircraft Artillery Searchlight Battalion. Reorganized and federally recognized 14 February 1947 at Chicago as the 698th Antiaircraft Artillery Gun Battalion. Ordered into active Federal service 1 May 1951 at Chicago; released from active federal service 31 January 1953 and reverted to state control. Redesignated 1 October 1953 as the 698th Antiaircraft Artillery Battalion (see above) and consolidated unit designated as the 698th Antiaircraft Artillery Battalion. Reorganized and redesignated 15 February 1958 as the 698th Missile Battalion. Consolidated 27 February 1958 with the 768th Antiaircraft Artillery Battalion (see above) and consolidated unit designated as the 698th Missile Battalion

=== Annex 2 ===
- Organized 14-16 November 1988 in the Illinois Army National Guard as the 202nd Air Defense Artillery, a parent regiment under the Combat Arms Regimental System, to consist of the 1st Battalion, an element of the 47th Infantry Division.
- Withdrawn 1 June 1989 from the Combat Arms Regimental System and reorganized under the United States Army Regimental System.
- Reorganized 10 February 1991 to consist of the 1st Battalion, an element of the 34th Infantry Division.

=== Annex 3 ===
- Organized 1 June 1940 in the Illinois National Guard at Chicago as the 2Nd Squadron, 106th Cavalry. Redesignated 1 September 1940 as the 1st Squadron, 106th Cavalry
- Inducted into Federal service 25 November 1940 at Chicago. Reorganized and redesignated 15 March 1944 as the 106th Cavalry Reconnaissance Squadron, Mechanized. Inactivated 24 October 1945 at Camp Shanks, New York
- Squadron subsequently broken up and its elements reorganized and Federally recognized as follows:
  - Headquarters and Headquarters Troop reorganized and Federally recognized 27 February 1947 in the Illinois National Guard at Chicago as Headquarters and Headquarters Detachment, 198th Transportation Truck Battalion.
  - Troop B reorganized and Federally recognized 27 May 1947 in the Illinois National Guard at Chicago as the 3563d Transportation Truck Company
  - Remainder of squadron reorganized as the 106th Cavalry Reconnaissance Squadron (hereafter separate lineage)
- Headquarters and Headquarters Detachment, 198th Transportation Truck Battalion, and the 3563d Transportation Truck Company converted, reorganized, and redesignated 15 February 1949 as Headquarters and Headquarters Company and Company B, 121st Heavy Tank Battalion (remaining elements of the 121st Heavy Tank Battalion concurrently organized from new and existing units). 121st Heavy Tank Battalion redesignated 1 September 1950 as the 121st Tank Battalion.
