= 1st Illinois Cavalry Regiment =

- Illinois flag
- Active: July 3, 1861, to December 27, 1862
- Country: United States
- Allegiance: Union
- Branch: Cavalry

The 1st Illinois Cavalry Regiment was a cavalry regiment that served in the Union Army during the American Civil War and Spanish–American War.

== Civil War ==
=== Service ===
Companies "A" to "G" of the 1st Illinois Volunteer Cavalry were mustered into service at Alton, Illinois, on July 3, 1861. Among their initial officers was future Washington philanthropist David P. Jenkins, who served as the regiment's first major. Companies "I," "H" and "K" were mustered at Alton at later dates and never served with the main body of the regiment. The original companies served as guards for supply trains and depots until mustered out on July 14, 1862. The remaining companies served independently. The last company was mustered out on December 27, 1862.

=== Noleman's Cavalry ===
Company H of the regiment was named "Noleman's Cavalry" after its captain, Robert D. Noleman. This company was organized at Centralia, Illinois, and mustered into service of the United States on June 14, 1861, for a period of one year. The group was first rendezvoused at Cairo, Illinois, but soon were transferred to Bird's Point, Missouri. They fought in the Battle of Belmont on November 7, 1861, and thereafter scouted through southeastern Missouri and western Kentucky during the winter of 1861–62.

On March 2, 1862, the group, joined by then-Colonel James D. Morgan, led the pursuit of Confederate Brigadier General M. Jeff Thompson in southeastern Missouri. They were unsuccessful in capturing Thompson but did capture artillery. Col. Morgan praised the group's perseverance and Gen. Thompson later recalled, "The cavalry are a perfect set of daredevils, all officers wearing feathers on their hats." From February to April 1862 the company joined Brigadier General John Pope in the Union effort to take New Madrid, or Kentucky Bend, on the Mississippi River. Their engagements included the Battle of Island Number Ten and the Confederate surrender after that battle at Tiptonville, Tennessee.

After the fall of New Madrid the group proceeded down the Mississippi River, and in June 1862 their company were the first U.S. troops to enter the city of Memphis. In July 1862 they were ordered to St. Louis to be mustered out of service. During their year of service Company H captured 167 prisoners, 209 horses and mules, and numerous guns and ammunition.

=== Total strength and casualties ===
The regiment suffered 17 enlisted men who were killed in action or who died of their wounds and 26 enlisted men who died of disease, for a total of 43 fatalities.

=== Commanders ===
- Colonel Thomas A. Marshall – mustered out July 14, 1862, with the main body of the regiment.

== Spanish–American War ==
Constituted 1 July 1897 in the Illinois National Guard as a squadron of cavalry and organized from existing troops. Expanded and mustered into Federal service 21 May 1898 at Springfield as the 1st Illinois Volunteer Cavalry; mustered out of Federal service 11 October 1898 at Fort Sheridan, Illinois. Reorganized in 1899 in the Illinois National Guard as a squadron of cavalry; expanded, reorganized and re-designated 22 June 1899 as the 1st Cavalry.

== Later reorganizations ==
Mustered into Federal service 27 June 1916; mustered out of Federal service 17 November 1916 at Fort Sheridan, Illinois. Non-Chicago elements of the regiment converted and re-designated 24 June 1917 as the 3d Field Artillery (Chicago elements converted and re-designated 9 June 1917 as the 2nd Field Artillery). Drafted into Federal service 5 August 1917. Reorganized and re-designated on 21 September 1917 as the 124th Field Artillery and assigned to the 33rd Division. Demobilized 8 June 1919 at Camp Grant, Illinois.

Reorganized 20 October 1922 in the Illinois National Guard as the 2nd Squadron, 106th Cavalry, an element of the 22nd Cavalry Division (remainder of regiment allotted to the Michigan National Guard). Reorganized 1 September 1940 wholly in the Illinois National Guard as the 106th Cavalry and relieved from assignment to the 22d Cavalry Division (2d Squadron) concurrently re-designated as the 1st Squadron of the 23d Cavalry Reconnaissance Squadron [constituted 1 January 1940 and organized in part by transfer of personnel from Troop F and Machine Gun Troop, 106th Cavalry, re-designated as the 2d Squadron. Inducted into Federal service 25 November 1940 at home stations. Regiment broken up 15 March 1944 and its elements reorganized and re-designated.

== See also ==
- List of Illinois Civil War Units
- Illinois in the American Civil War
- 106th Cavalry Regiment (United States)
