= David P. Jenkins =

American lawyer

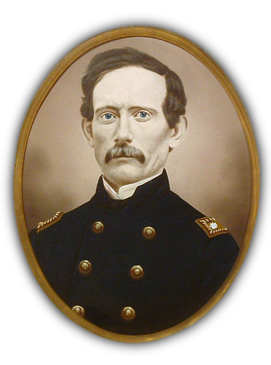
- Born: August 25, 1823; Mount Pleasant, Ohio
- Died: March 30, 1915 (aged 91); Spokane, Washington
- Military career
- Allegiance: (United States) United States; Union
- Branch: United States Army; Union Army
- Service years: 1861 to 1865
- Rank: Major; Colonel
- Commands: 1st Illinois Cavalry Regiment; 14th Illinois Cavalry Regiment
- Conflicts: American Civil War

David P. Jenkins (August 25, 1823 – March 30, 1915), was an American attorney, soldier, businessman and philanthropist who homesteaded Spokane, Washington.

== Biography ==
Jenkins was born on a farm near Mount Pleasant, Ohio, to orthodox Quaker parents. He was educated at the local Quaker seminary and in the high school in Mount Pleasant. He studied law in Cincinnati, Ohio, and passed his bar exam. He moved to LaSalle, Illinois, where he established a prosperous legal practice. He was an acquaintance of Abraham Lincoln (both men were lawyers for the Illinois Circuit Courts).

During the American Civil War, Jenkins served in the Union Army under Generals Grant, Pope, Sherman and Burnside in the Western Theater. Initially, he was the major of the 1st Illinois Cavalry. Jenkins saw his first combat action in two engagements near Lexington, Missouri, and helped negotiate the surrender of Federal forces in that vicinity to the Confederates in September 1861, becoming a prisoner of war.

He was exchanged that November and returned to the ranks, commanding two companies of the cavalry at Bird's Point, Missouri, from December until the spring of 1862, when he was assigned command of a battalion of the 1st Illinois Cavalry in southern Missouri, where his men protected supply lines to the army of General Samuel Curtis operating in Arkansas. In mid-1863, Jenkins became the lieutenant colonel and later the colonel of the 14th Illinois Cavalry, a regiment which he helped recruit and train.

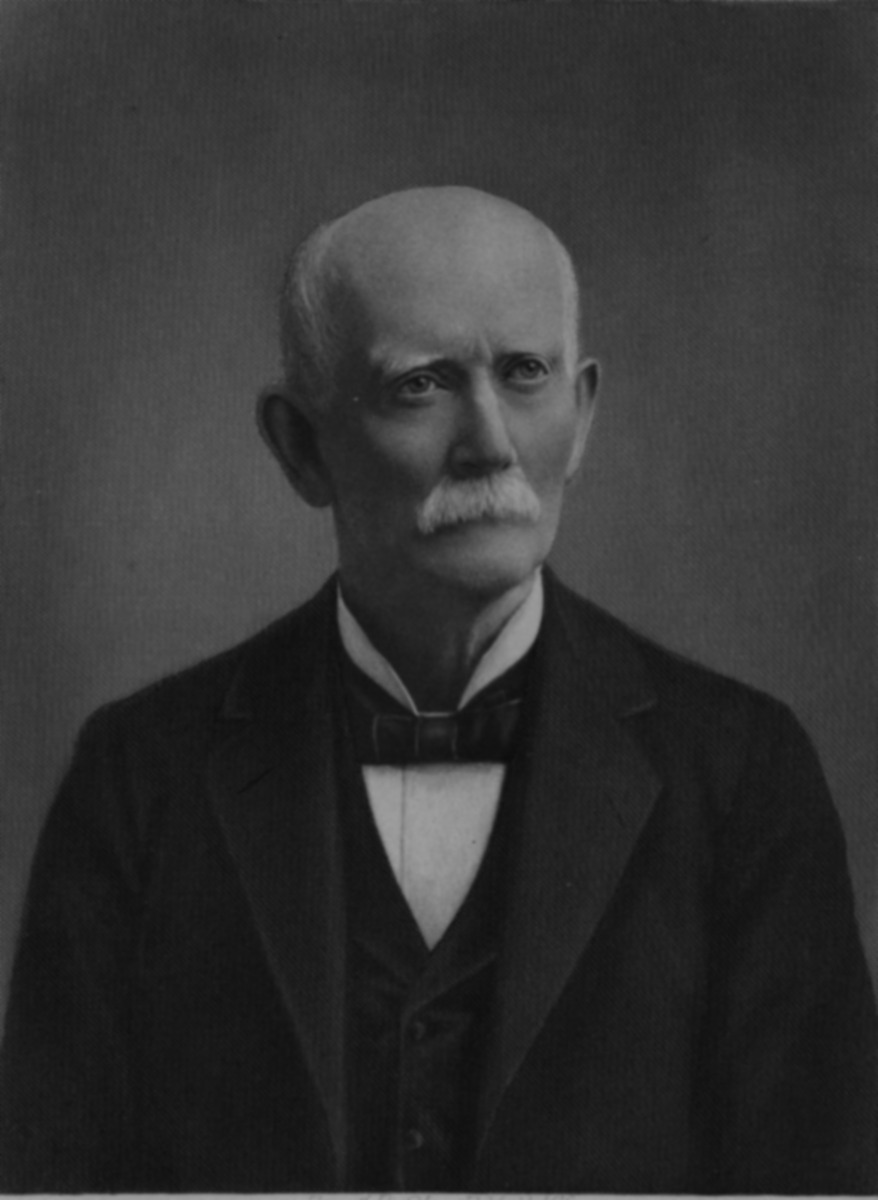
Jenkins in 1890

Following the war he moved to the Washington Territory, establishing a law firm in Seattle in 1874 and serving as Seattle's city attorney in 1876. In 1879 he settled in Spokane, where he became a friend to Chief Spokane Garry and Chief Joseph the Younger, whom he admired for their honesty and integrity. Jenkins kept a photograph of Chief Joseph on his mantle.

Jenkins donated part of his homestead and $5,000 for land and capital to build the Spokane County Courthouse. His daughter, Emma Rue, donated the eastern edge of their homestead to the city for the Coliseum (now the Spokane Veterans Memorial Arena).

Jenkins, a strong supporter of education, attempted twice to fund the first university in Spokane, which ultimately failed due to the economic Panic of 1893. The colonel was also concerned about young men who had to forego higher education to work to support themselves and their families, so he created a trust of $50,000 to fund Spokane's first vocational school for adults, located in and directed by the YMCA. The Institute prospered, reaching its peak of popularity about the time World War I broke out.

He retired to Chewelah, Washington. He is best known in Chewelah for donating the land and capital to build Jenkins High School in 1910. Jenkins loved animals; he bought land in Chewelah partly to house his many pets, including domesticated deer. He donated land in Spokane to establish a Humane Society (on which it stands today).

He died at his daughter's home in Spokane on March 30, 1915.
