= Battle of Charleston =

The Battle of Charleston or Siege of Charleston can refer to several battles:

- Lefebvre's Charles Town expedition (4 September – 11 September 1706) during the War of the Spanish Succession
- The Siege of Charleston (29 March – 12 May 1780) during the American Revolutionary War
- The Battle of Charleston (1861) (19 August 1861), a battle in Missouri during the American Civil War also known as the Battle of Bird's Point
- The Battle of Charleston (1862) (13 September 1862), a battle in Virginia (now West Virginia) during the American Civil War
- The First Battle of Charleston Harbor (7 April 1863) in South Carolina during the American Civil War
- The Second Battle of Charleston Harbor (18 July – 7 September 1863) in South Carolina during the American Civil War

== See also ==
- Charleston in the American Civil War
- Charleston (disambiguation)
