= Battle of Charleston (1861) =

Battle of the American Civil War

- Part of the Trans-Mississippi Theater of the American Civil War
Date	August 19–20, 1861
Location	Mississippi County, Missouri 36.921389°N 89.346389°W
Result	Union victory

Belligerents
(United States) Union Army	Missouri State Guard

Commanders and leaders
Col. Henry Dougherty	Col. J. H. Hunter

Strength
11th & 22nd Illinois Infantry (250 men)	Missouri State Guard Cavalry (500 men)

Casualties and losses
1 killed 7 wounded	13 killed unknown wounded
- Location within Missouri

The Battle of Charleston, also known as the Battle of Bird's Point, was a minor clash in Charleston, Missouri, United States during the American Civil War. On August 19, 1861, Union forces led by Col. Henry Dougherty were able to destroy a Confederate camp. There had been a number of clashes in the Charleston and Bird's Point area for the previous week between pro-Union forces and secession groups.

== Battle ==
Colonel Dougherty, commanding the 22nd Illinois Infantry and Lieutenant Colonel Ransom of the 11th Illinois, which was stationed at Bird's Point, took 250 men and went by train to Charleston, where a force of Confederate infantry and cavalry belonging to the Missouri state troops was stationed. When near the city the troops were divided into two parties, one commanded by Dougherty and the other by Lieutenant Colonel Hart. About 100 yards from the public square the cavalry, numbering about 200, was drawn up to halt the progress of the Federals. One volley drove them into a cornfield. Dougherty then ordered the men forward at the double-quick to the public square, where the main body of the infantry was encountered. The enemy took shelter behind the houses and poured a heavy fire on the Union troops. In the meantime the cavalry had been rallied and attacked Hart, who faced his men both ways and succeeded in dispersing them. Col. J. H. Hunter, commanding the Confederates, then retreated and was afterward placed under arrest.

=== Capture of Fish Lake Camp ===
Captain R. D. Noleman along with 50 men of the Centralia Cavalry advanced upon Charleston; passed through the streets without any resistance and captured two rebels, who informed the Captain that the forces under Colonel Dougherty had preceded them and had engaged the enemy. They also informed the Captain that there was an encampment of mounted rebels at a point near or upon what is called Fish Lake, 5 miles east of Charleston, and about 2 1/2 miles north of the railroad. Taking one of the captured men for a guide, Noleman took up the line of march in the direction indicated. Noleman came upon the enemy's camp, which was situated in a dense wood which surrounded an open space of some eight acres. Day was just breaking and Noleman's men fired some forty shots and the enemy replied. The rebels then laid down their arms and surrendered. Noleman's men took 33 men prisoners, captured 38 horses, and took possession of about the same number of rifles and shotguns, together with accouterments and ammunition.

== Arrest of Colonel Hunter ==
Colonel Hunter was placed under arrest by Brigadier General M. Jeff Thompson, Commanding Missouri State Guard. Thompson, in his report stated "If Colonel Hunter had advanced only far enough to march back to his camp after driving in their pickets, the object and order would have been accomplished; but he reached Charleston at 10 a.m., remained there all day and night, within a few hours' march of an overwhelming force."
