= Bird's Point, Missouri =

Unincorporated community in Missouri, United States

Coordinates: 36.966°N 89.157°W

Bird's Point (or Birds Point) is an unincorporated community in Mississippi County, Missouri, United States. It lies on an island or former island in the Mississippi River, near the confluence of the Ohio and Mississippi Rivers and is situated directly across from Cairo, Illinois. This is the point where the U.S. Route 60 bridge connects with Cairo.

== History ==
Bird's Point was named for Abraham Bird Sr, who was a prominent planter and businessman in Shenandoah County, Virginia. He brought his family briefly to Bourbon, Kentucky and then, in 1796, to what later became Cairo, Illinois, and later, to this location (Bird's Point). It is said that they were the first white people to live in this area. Lewis and Clark encountered the Bird's Point settlement, during their famed expedition, in 1803.

Bird's Point was a strategic site during the Civil War. The Battle of Charleston was fought in the vicinity on August 19, 1861. Union cavalry under David P. Jenkins guarded the region for the early part of the war, deterring Confederate attempts to regain control of the supply routes. Once secured, Bird's Point was transformed into an important supply and repair site, as well as a training camp and military post, for the Union army and navy. Following the war, many of the military buildings were converted to civilian usage, including the boat yard.

In the 1880s, the area was an important railroad and river terminus for cotton distribution, and a series of ferries facilitated movement of cargo and passengers from the island to the Illinois riverbank. The narrow-gauge Texas and St. Louis Railway built into Bird's Point in 1882. When the remainder of the railroad was completed, it stretched from Bird's Point to Gatesville, Texas. An incline was used to transfer railcars onto car floats for the cross-Mississippi trip from Bird's Point to Cairo, Illinois. The Texas and St. Louis went bankrupt and the new company was the St. Louis, Arkansas and Texas Railway. That railroad rebuilt the line to standard gauge so the railroads shippers would not have to break bulk by transferring to a different gauge railroad. When the St. Louis, Arkansas and Texas Railway went bankrupt it was taken over by the St. Louis Southwestern Railway, nicknamed the Cotton Belt. The railroad ran from Bird's Point through Pine Bluff, Arkansas, Texarkana, Texas and to Gatesville, Texas, offering planters a convenient route to transfer their cotton bales to the Mississippi for water transport to markets in the Midwest. The Cotton Belt moved most of its car ferry operations to a new incline and car float at Gray's Point, Missouri in 1898. In September 1908, the river bank caved in and essentially destroyed the boat yard and surrounding facilities. The railroad incline was destroyed in a flood in April 1909. The Cotton Belt continued to serve Birds Point with rail service for a number of years. The Cotton Belt 5.3 mile rail line between Birds Point and Wyatt was abandoned by ICC order on October 9, 1938. In late 1941, an oil pipeline was laid on the old Cotton Belt right of way between Wyatt and Birds Point to facilitate the transportation of crude oil by barge. A small tank farm was built just south of Birds Point for oil storage. Cotton Belt handled railroad tank cars from Texas and Louisiana to Wyatt for shipment of the oil to Birds Point and trans loading onto barges.

The Cairo Mississippi River Bridge carrying U.S. Routes 60 and 62 over the river between Bird's Point and Cairo was completed in 1929.

The Missouri Pacific Railroad had a rail line into Birds Point from Charleston, Missouri. A rail car ferry to Cairo, Illinois was operated by the Missouri Pacific. The Missouri Pacific rail line to Birds Point was abandoned on March 31, 1942, and the rail line cut back to Alfalfa Center, Missouri.

Bird's Point today is marked by several large grain elevators and storage facilities.

== The Birds Point-New Madrid Floodway ==
The area is part of the New Madrid Floodway Project. Prompted by the Great Flood of 1927 the US Army Corps of Engineers installed an earthen levee to protect the rich farmland of Mississippi County. The section of the Levee at Birds Point was engineered so that when the water reached 61 feet (19 m) on the nearby Cairo flood gauge, the river would over-top the levee and erode it away. This would allow the river to fill the 133,000 acres (54,000 ha) floodway and relieve pressure on the flood control systems in place at nearby Cairo, Illinois and Hickman, Kentucky. This whole area has been engineered to allow for intentional flooding but has only been used twice: in 1937 and 2011.

Two other floodways were built on the Mississippi River downstream: the Bonnet Carré Spillway and the Morganza Spillway, both of which have gates that can be opened for flood control.

== Notable person ==
Jazz pianist Jess Stacy was born in Bird's Point in 1904.
