= Parroy =

- Commune
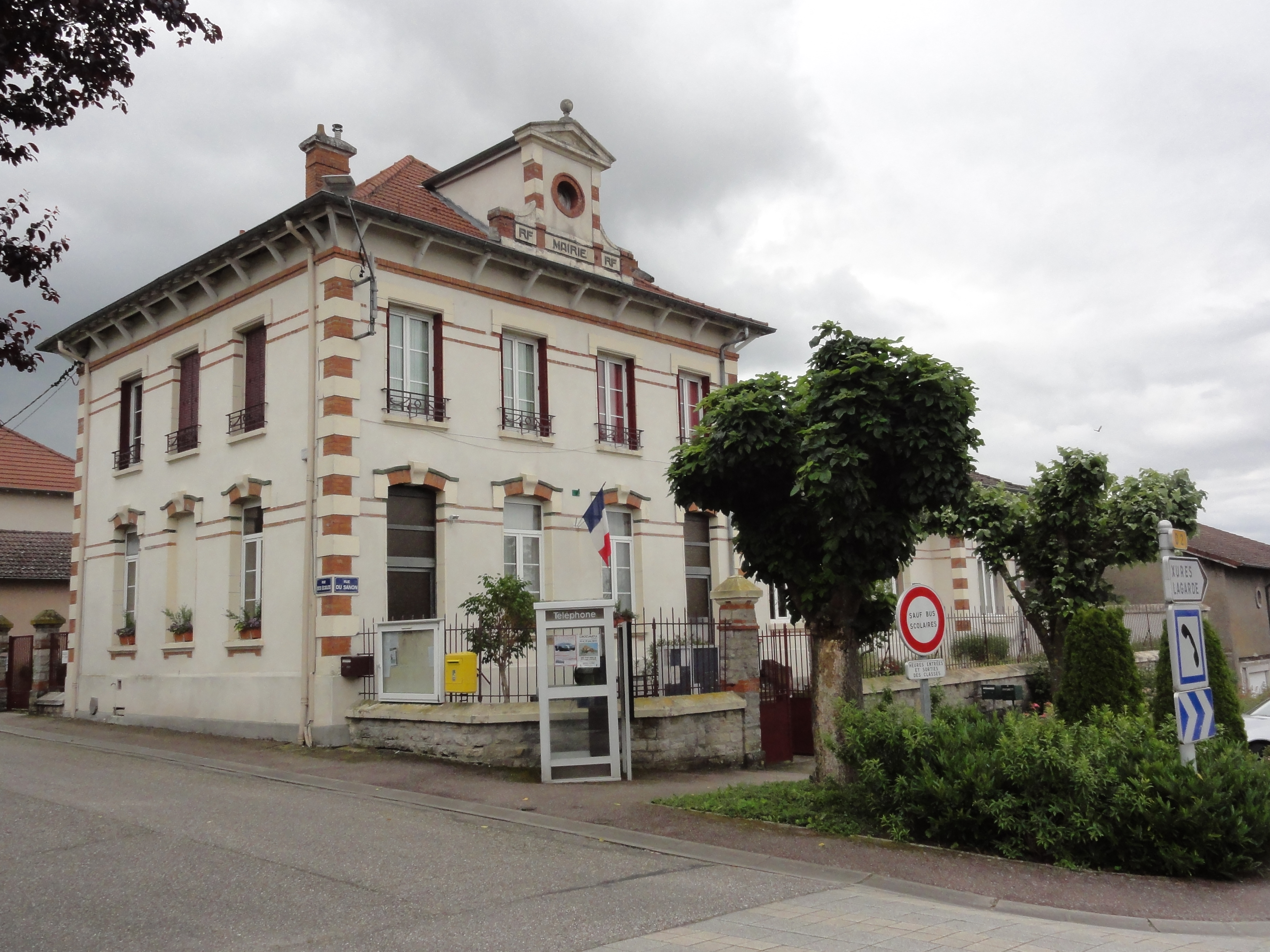
- The town hall in Parroy

- Coat of arms
- Location of Parroy
- Location within France Location within Grand Est
- Coordinates: 48°41′00″N 6°36′06″E
- Country: France
- Region: Grand Est
- Department: Meurthe-et-Moselle
- Arrondissement: Lunéville
- Canton: Baccarat
- Intercommunality: Pays du Sânon

Government
  - Mayor (2020–2026): Roland Wagner
- Area^{1}: 17.65 km^{2} (6.81 sq mi)
- Elevation: 250 m (820 ft)
- Highest elevation: 303 m (994 ft)
- Lowest elevation: 222 m (728 ft)
- Population (2023): 183
  - Density: 10.4/km^{2} (26.9/sq mi)
- Time zone: UTC+01:00 (CET)
  - Summer (DST): UTC+02:00 (CEST)
- INSEE/Postal code: 54418 /54370
- ^{1} French Land Register data, which excludes lakes, ponds, glaciers > 1 km^{2} (0.386 sq mi or 247 acres) and river estuaries.

Parroy (French pronunciation: [paʁwa]) is a commune in the Meurthe-et-Moselle department in north-eastern France.

== See also ==
- Communes of the Meurthe-et-Moselle department
