= Vest Pocket Kodak =

American folding cameras (1912–1934)

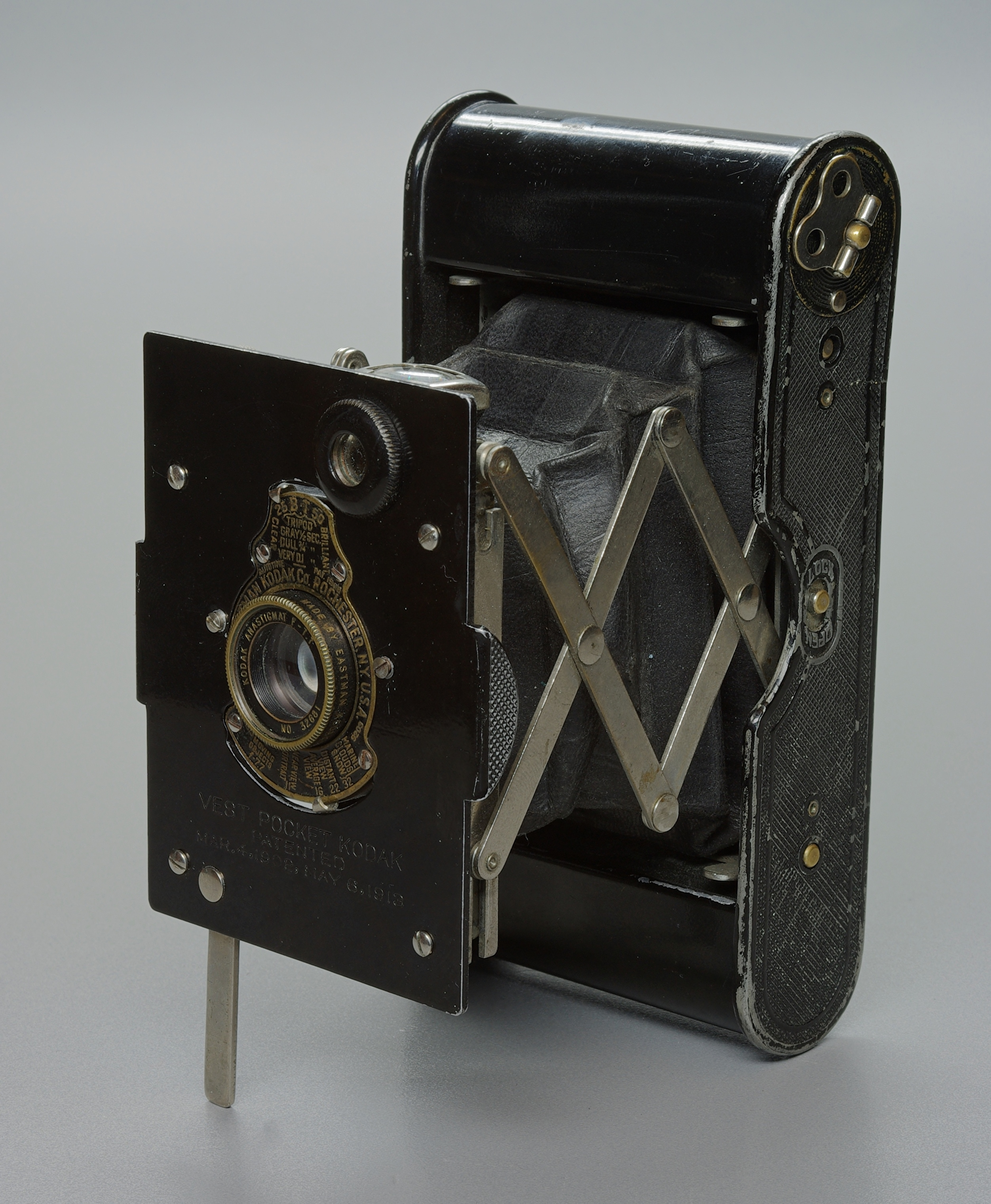
Vest Pocket Kodak with f/7.7 Anastigmat lens, opened and front support deployed

The Vest Pocket Kodak (VPK), also known as the Soldier's Kodak, is a line of compact folding cameras introduced by Eastman Kodak in April 1912 and produced until 1934, when it was succeeded by the Kodak Bantam. Because the VPK uses 127 film, it is more compact than contemporary folding cameras using 120 film and larger sheet film formats offered by Kodak; measuring approximately 12×6.3×2.7 cm (4.7×2.5×1.1 in) when stowed, it could be carried in a vest pocket, as the name suggests.

== Design ==
The basic design of the Vest Pocket Kodak has a lens on a flat platform which extends manually from the body, sealed by a light-tight bellows. Several different lenses were offered, with cameras fitted with upgraded lenses named "Vest Pocket Kodak Special", and numerous cosmetic variations exist. Popular competitive cameras at the time were the Houghton Ensignettes, which used films of similar but not identical size, designated 128 and 129. The Vest Pocket Kodak outcompeted the Ensignettes, and Houghton introduced a new 127-film model, almost identical to its predecessors, called the Vest Pocket Ensign.

=== First generation ===
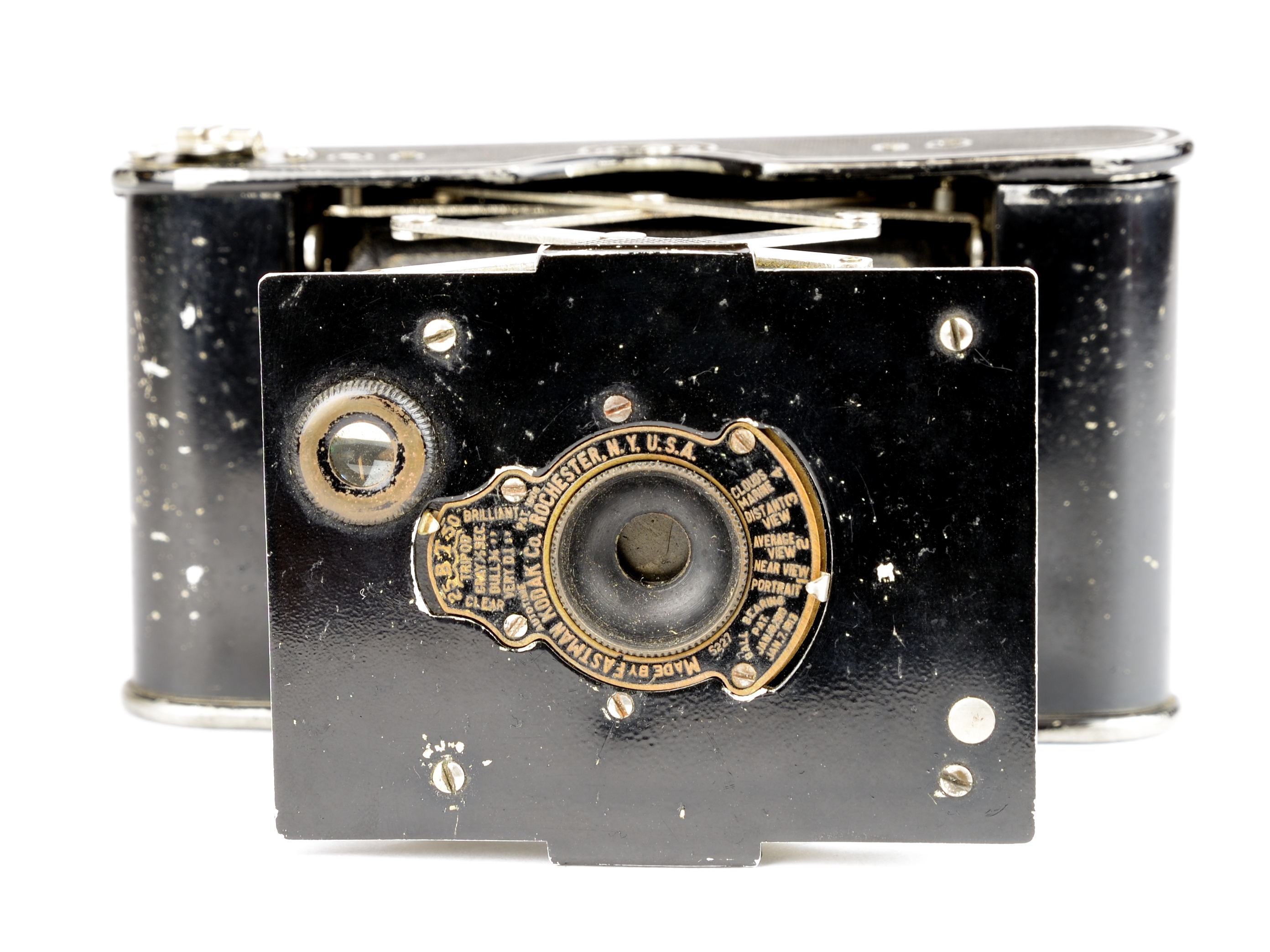
VPK with meniscus achromat lens, view of the front lens standard, extended. The viewfinder is in the round hole at left, towards the top of the standard. An ornate lens nameplate surrounds the dish-shaped lens hood; the shutter speed is set at the top and the aperture is set at the bottom.

The original version used a rectangular front lens standard extending on a pantograph mechanism and is a fixed-focus camera. When closed, the camera measures (H×W×D) 12×6.3×2.7 cm (4.7×2.5×1.1 in); open, depth expands to 9.6 cm (3.8 in). The camera weighed approximately 300 g (11 oz). The image captured on the film measures 2 1/2×1 5/8 in (6.4×4.1 cm). It succeeded the No. 0 Folding Pocket Kodak (1902–06), which captures images of the same size on 121 film; the No. 0 is bulkier with a wooden body compared to the metal-bodied VPK.

The camera offered shutter speeds of 1/25, 1/50 sec and "T"imer and "B"ulb settings, using Kodak's ball bearing shutter. Instead of conventional aperture f-stop settings, numbered values were given instead to control depth of field for the fixed-focus meniscus lens, with #4 being the most closed and #1 being the most open:

1. near view / portrait
2. average view
3. distant view
4. clouds / marine

Contemporary advertisements focused on the cameras' compact dimensions, noting "the [VPK] may always be carried where a larger camera would sometimes be an inconvenience ... You don't know it's there till you want it and think of the picture possibilities you have missed because you didn't have a camera with you." and "If [picture opportunities] happen when you have your large Kodak with you, well and good, but they can never catch you off your guard if you carry a V. P. K."

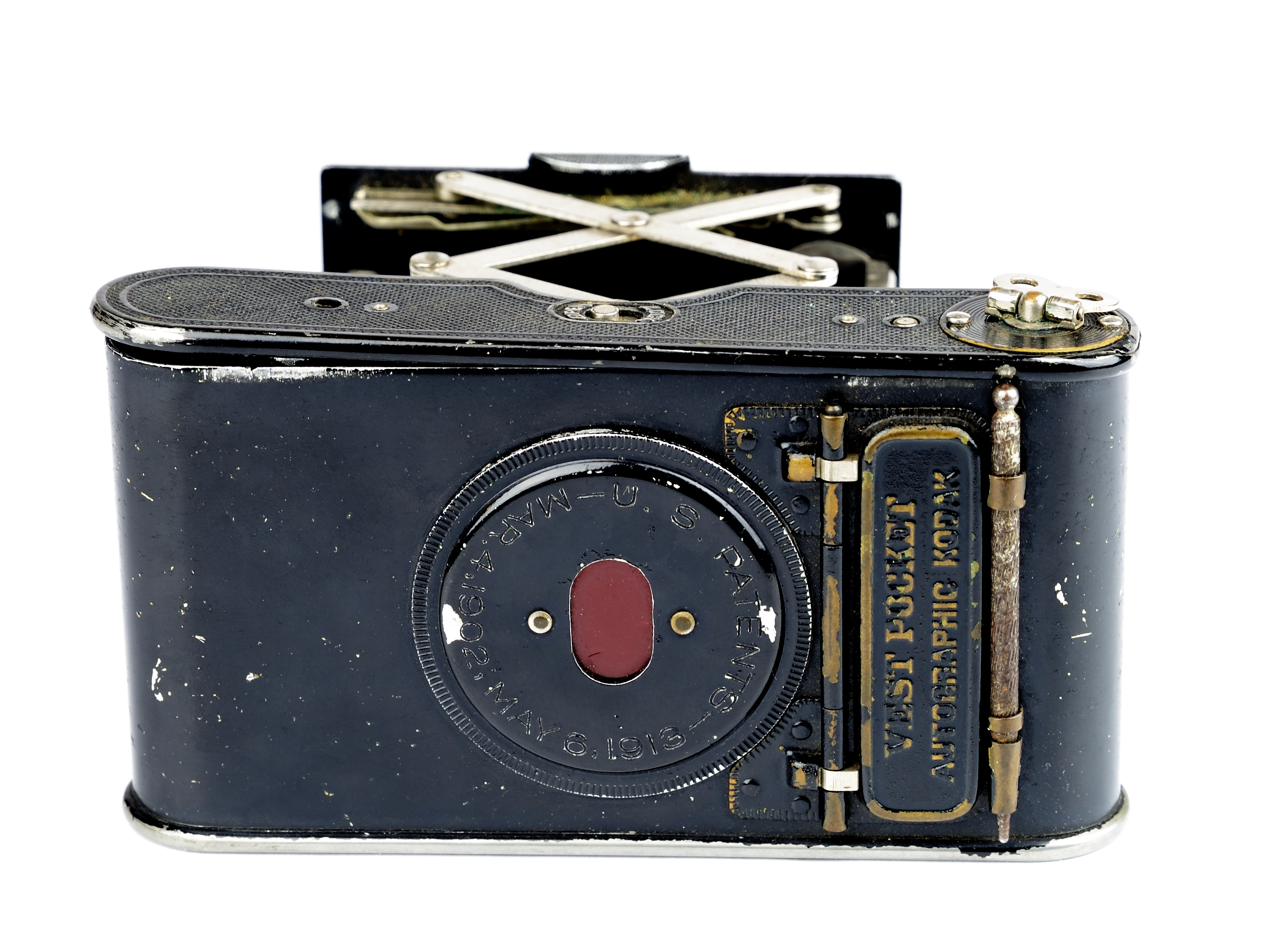
Rear of Autographic VPK, showing flap and stylus holder

In 1914, Kodak introduced Autographic film after acquiring the rights to the invention from Henry Jacques Gaisman; this film included thin carbon paper sheets which allowed the photographer to jot short notes directly on the film using a metal stylus. Autographic versions of the VPK were released in 1915 and soon became the default version; they were sold until 1926. The VPK was billed as "The Soldier's Kodak" and contemporary Kodak marketing materials recommended highlighting its rugged features and direct marketing to deploying soldiers. Approximately two million VPK and VPK Autographic cameras were sold before the original line was discontinued in 1926, making it the most popular camera of its time.

=== Second generation (Model B and Series III) ===
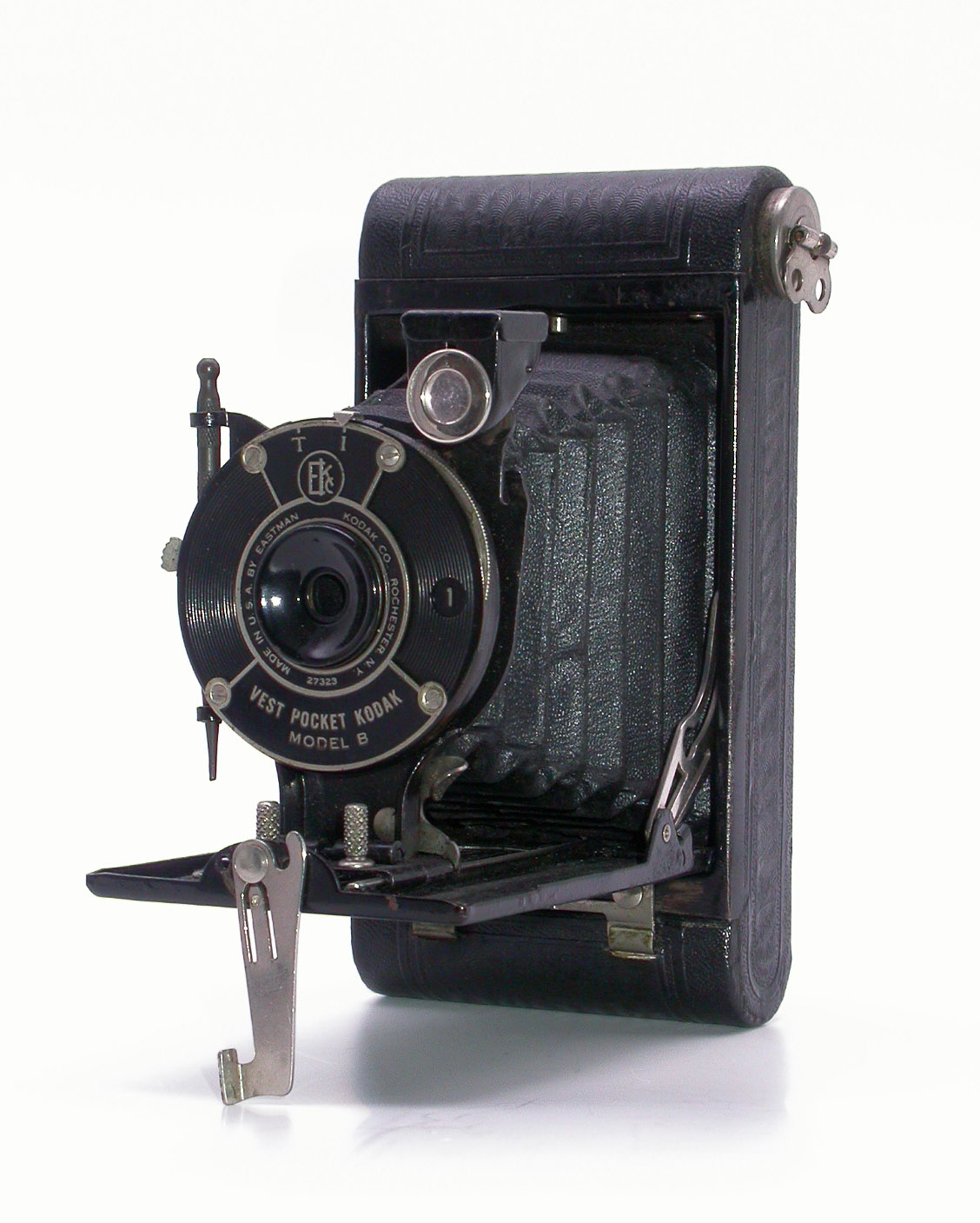
VPK Model B

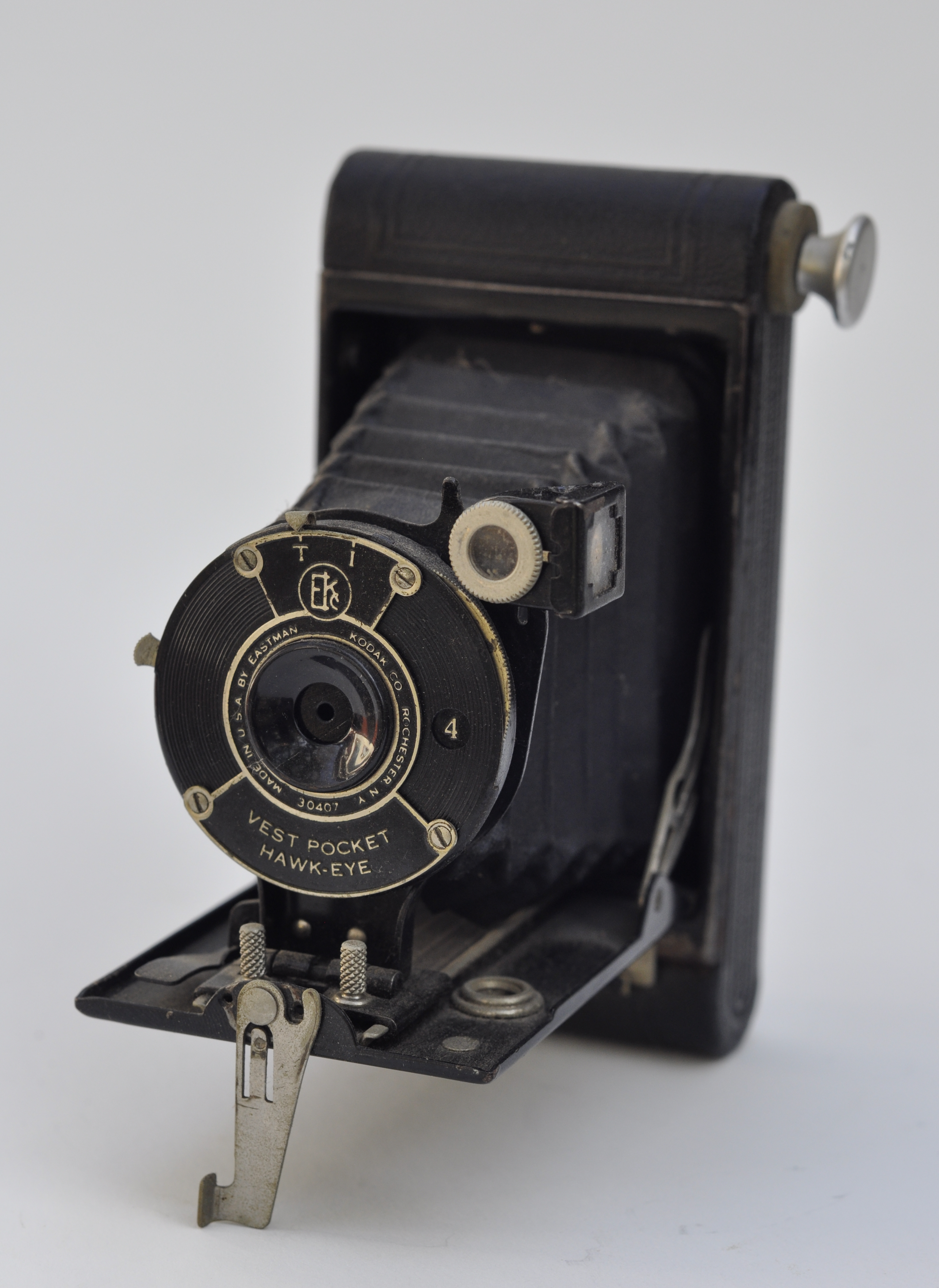
Vest Pocket Hawk-Eye

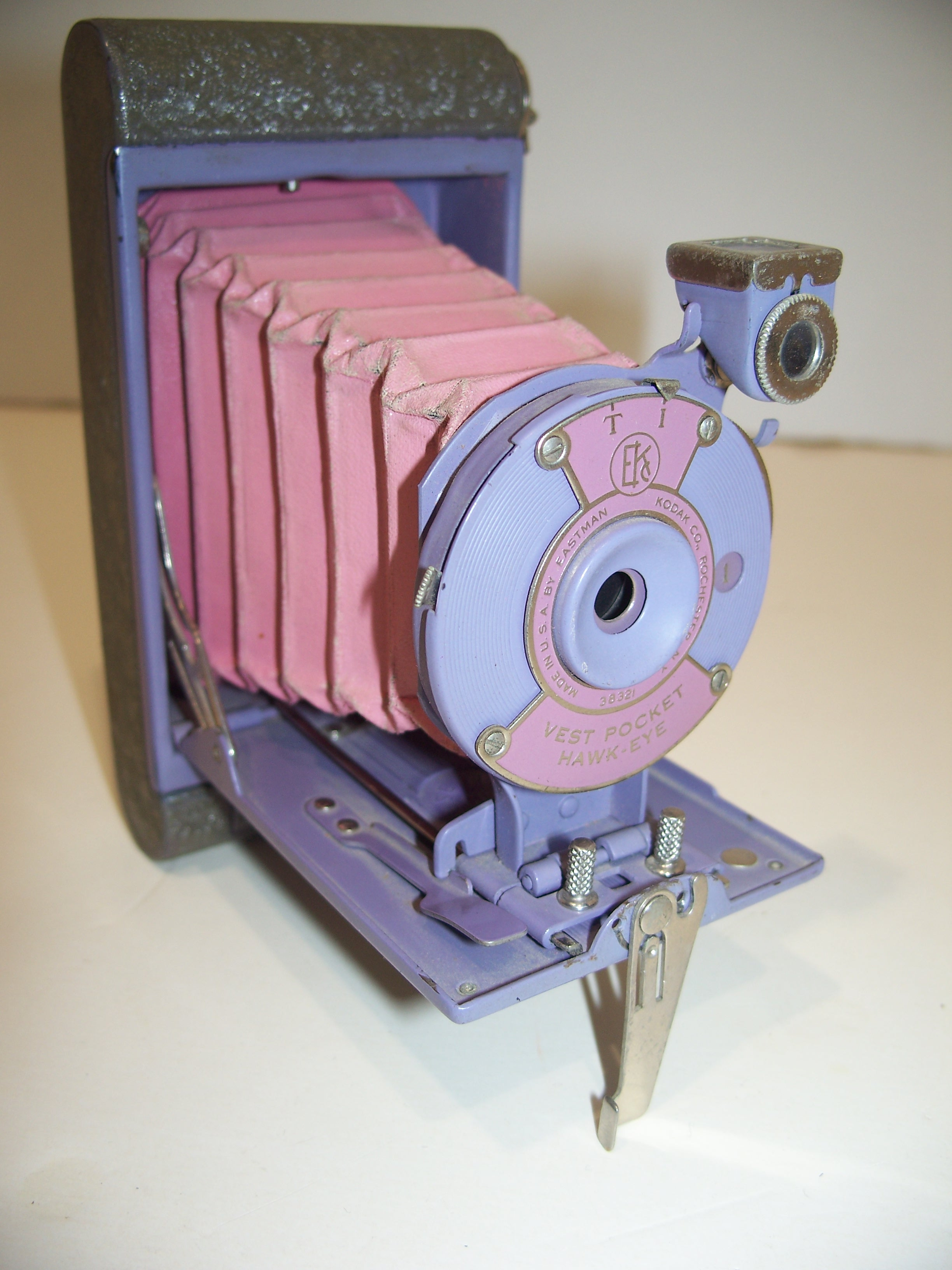
Vest Pocket Hawk-Eye

The VPK Model B was introduced in 1925 and sold until 1934, bringing several notable updates, as the basic design switched to a folding-bed camera. Cosmetically, the front lens standard is circular; focus adjustment is possible with a focusing rail built into the drop-down bed. Instead of removing a side plate and sliding the film into the body, the Model B bellows and front standard are removed from the rest of the camera to load the film.

The Model B was sold in several special versions with different colors for the Boy Scouts, Boy Scouts of America, Camp Fire Girls, Girl Guides, and Girl Scouts of the USA; the Model B also was the basis for the Kodak Petite (1929–33), Vest Pocket Hawk-Eye, and Rainbow Hawk-Eye.

The VPK Series III was introduced one year after the Model B and also discontinued in 1934. VPK Series III cameras may be distinguished by the prominent "KODAK" branding on the lens support stand. Colored versions of the Series III were sold as the Vanity Kodak.

=== Lenses ===
The entry-level models of the VPK commonly were fitted with the achromat lens, a cemented doublet meniscus lens with a focal length of 75 mm, giving it a diagonal angle-of-view of 54° on the 2 1/2×1 5/8 in (64×41 mm) 127 film format. The VPK also was available with faster lenses with focal lengths ranging from 75 to 85 mm, including:

- Kodak Achromat f/11
- Kodak Anastigmat f/8
- Kodak Kodar f/7.9
- Kodak Anastigmat f/7.7
- Rapid Rectilinear
- Zeiss Kodak Anastigmat f/6.9
- Kodak Anastigmat f/6.8
- TT&H Cooke f/6.5
- Kodak Anastigmat f/6.3
- Kodak Anastigmat f/5.6
- Kodak Anastigmat f/4.5

The meniscus achromat may be modified for soft focus photography by removing the dish-shaped lens hood, taking advantage of its uncorrected spherical aberration at wide apertures; in Japan, this lens is nicknamed Vestan (ベス単). (Note: Alternatively, vesutan (-ha). The etymology of besutan (-ha) or vesutan (-ha) (ベス単派 or ヴェス単派): besu/vesu from besuto/vesuto (Japanese for "vest"); tan from tantai, tanjun, etc (Japanese for "simple" or "simplex"); ha meaning "group" or "tendency". Material in English about the Vest Pocket Kodak in Japan uses a variety of spellings, including vestan.) Initially, this modification was performed to improve lens speed, but the notable soft focus effect was appreciated and the lens enjoyed another wave of popularity in the 1970s as several photographers published images using the vestan as a short telephoto remounted for 135 film cameras, including Shōji Ueda. Interchangeable soft focus lenses for modern cameras inspired by the simple doublet Vestan lens design have been released several times since the 1970s, including the Kiyohara Kogaku (KOPTIC) VK70R and VK50R (1986), Nikon Fuwatto Soft (1995) and the Yasuhara MOMO 100 (2016).

== Notable users ==
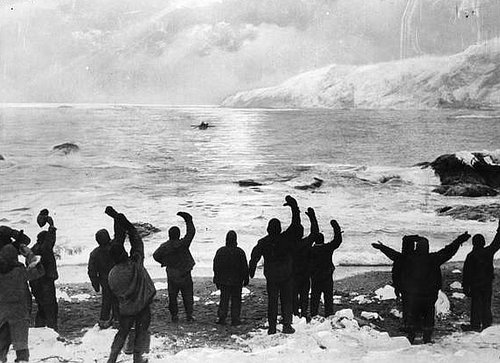
The departure of the James Caird photographed by Hurley on his VPK

Frank Hurley, official photographer of Sir Ernest Shackleton's 1914 Imperial Trans-Antarctic Expedition, salvaged a VPK and three rolls of film from the sinking of the expedition ship Endurance with the loss of most of his photographic equipment. He used it to shoot 38 images of the successful return of the party to civilisation.

A VPK was carried during the 1924 British Mount Everest expedition and may offer proof that climbers George Mallory and Andrew Irvine reached the summit, but it has never been found.
