= Nikon Amusing Lenses =

Toy lenses for Nikon SLR cameras

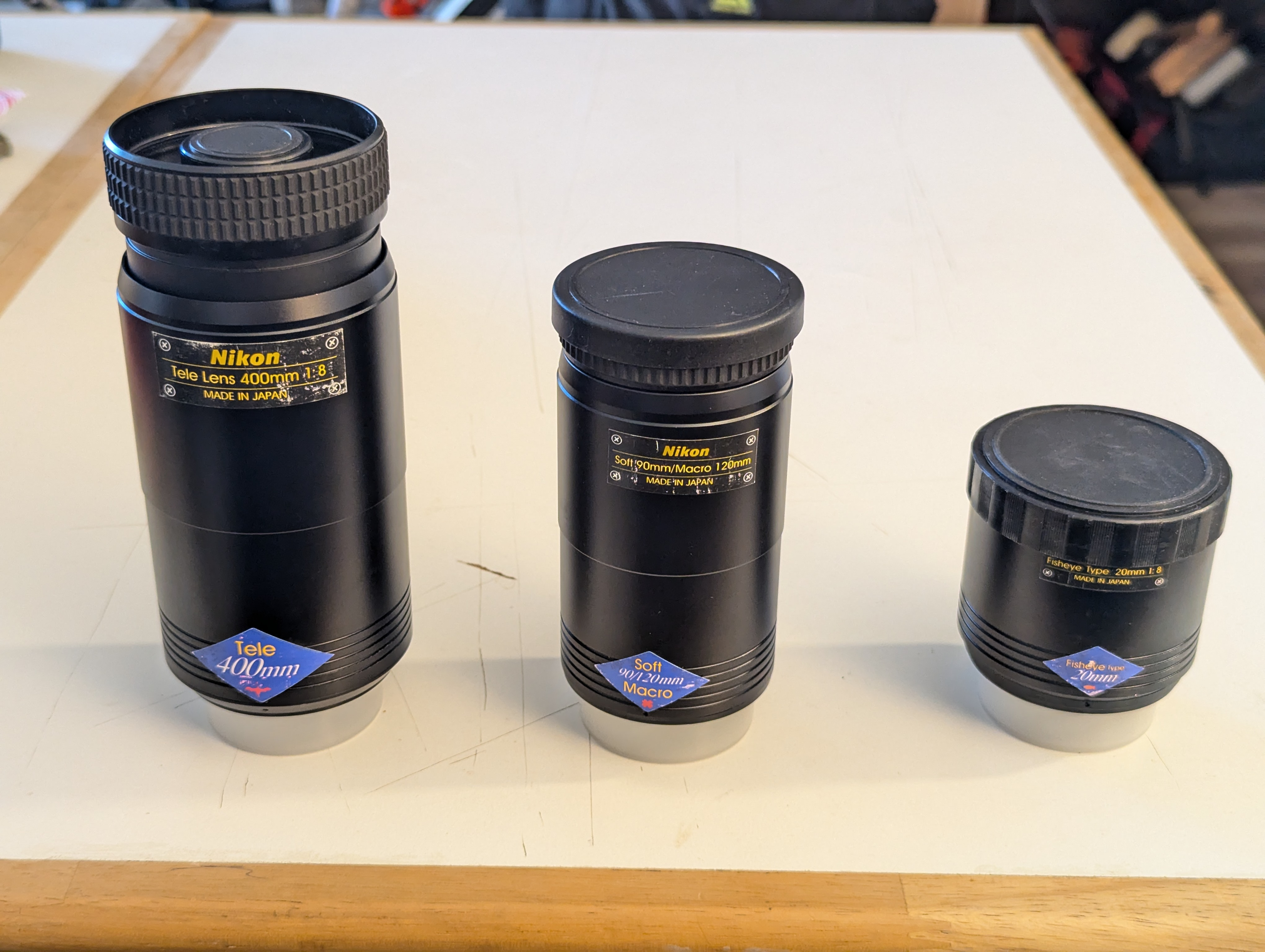
Nikon Amusing Lenses; L–R: Dodotto 400 (stowed), Gugutto Macro / Fuwatto Soft, Gyogyotto 20. Each lens has two stickers applied to the lens body.

The Nikon Amusing Lenses (ニコン おもしろレンズ工房) are a limited production set of four toy lenses for the Nikon F mount sold exclusively in Japan. The Amusing Lenses were designed by Kouichi Ohshita and introduced in 1995, then discontinued in 1996; they were re-released in 2000 as the Fun Fun LensSet, which was discontinued again in 2003. The lenses included are:

- Gyogyotto 20 (ぎょぎょっと20), a f=20 mm f/8 fisheye lens
- Gugutto Macro (ぐぐっとマクロ), a f=120 mm f/4.5 macro lens
- Fuwatto Soft (ふわっとソフト), a f=90 mm f/4.8 soft focus lens
- Dodotto 400 (どどっと400), a f=400 mm f/8 telephoto lens

== Design and history ==
The concept for the lens set started from a meeting in 1994 led by Masaaki Tsukamoto, who had developed the Nikonos RS and was seeking ideas for new lenses. One of the participants suggested a soft focus lens, as the Vestan (ベス単) cemented doublet meniscus lens from the Vest Pocket Kodak had influenced photography in Japan; the soft focus suggestion was warmly received for its potential to teach photographers about basic lens construction. After discussions with management, Tsukamoto was given permission to proceed with the project, after the scope had been expanded to include a set of four basic lens types (fisheye, soft focus, macro, and telephoto) with a retail price target of ¥5,000 and sufficient optical performance to support prints at up to 2L size, 127×178 mm (5×7 in).

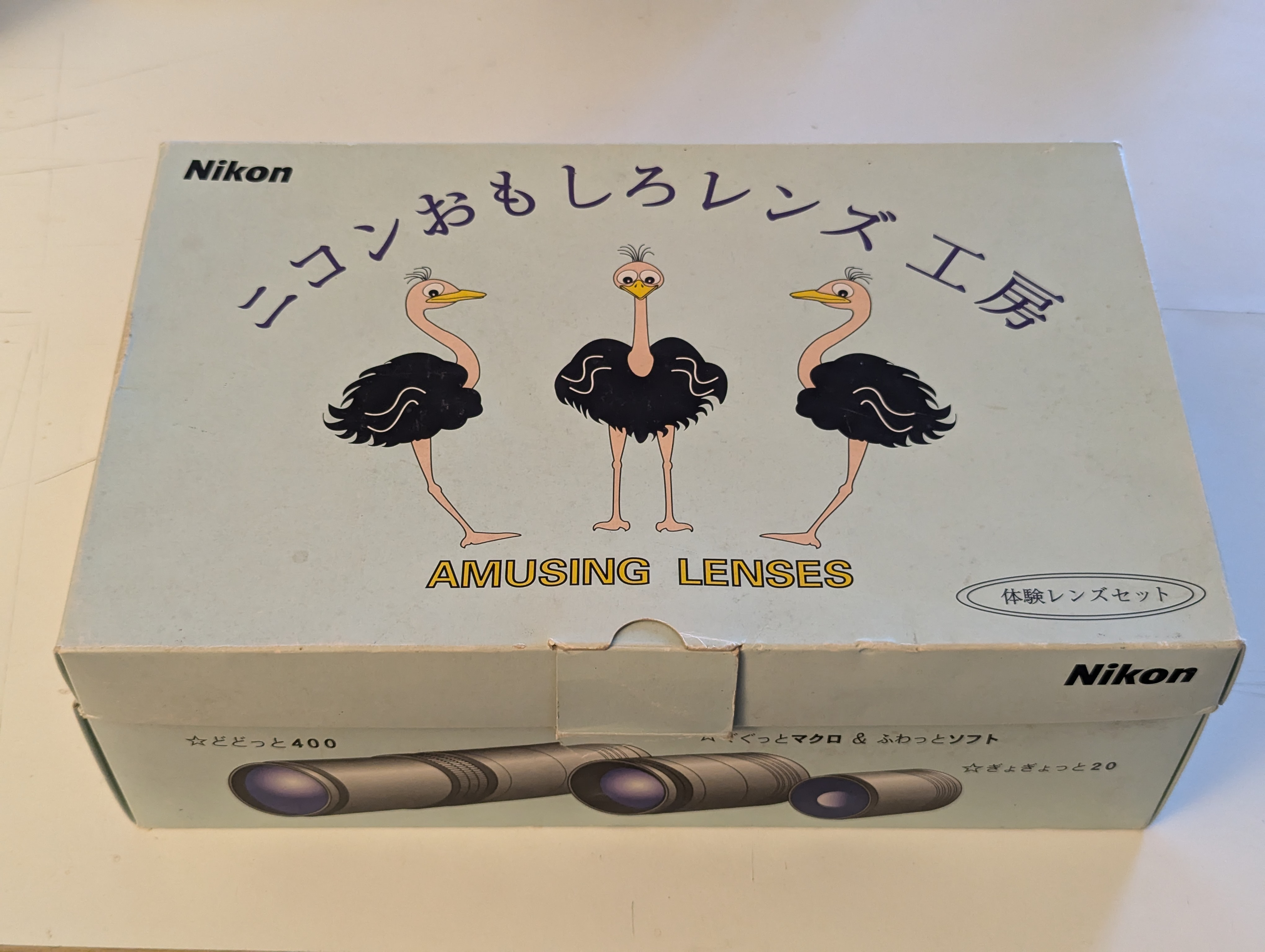
1995 box

Kouichi Ohshita, the lead optical designer, recalled his design goals gradually changed to lenses "that press and advanced amateur photographers can use in emergencies!" When the set was released, it retailed for ¥18,000; production of the first version was limited to 5,000 sets. When they were re-released in 2000, some cosmetic changes were made. Rather than marketing the lenses strictly by focal length and aperture, they were given "endearing" nicknames, such as "Fish" (Gyogyotto 20), "Fluffy and Soft" (Fuwatto Soft), and "Dodo" (Dodotto 400), and a sticker set was included to allow the owner to decorate the metal lens barrels; the packaging featured an illustration of a cartoon ostrich.

For each lens the aperture is not adjustable, although the instruction manual states that to control the degree of soft focus with the Fuwatto Soft, a Waterhouse stop could be cut out of stiff paper and applied to the front of the lens; the lens's designer, Kouichi Ohshita, suggested an opening of 15 mm (0.59 in) in diameter, equivalent to f/6.

Nikon Amusing Lenses
Lens Spec		Gyogyotto 20 (ぎょぎょっと20)	Gugutto Macro (ぐぐっとマクロ)	Fuwatto Soft (ふわっとソフト)	Dodotto 400 (どどっと400)
Focal length (mm)		20	120	90	400
Aperture		f/8	f/4.5	f/4.8	f/8
Construction	Diagram				
Construction	Elements	3	3	2	4
Construction	Groups	2	2	1	2
Min. focus		1 m (39 in), fixed at 1.6 m (63 in)	0.64 m (25 in)	0.4 m (16 in)	4.5 m (180 in)
Dimensions	Φ×L	65×68 mm (2.6×2.7 in)	60×112 mm (2.4×4.4 in)		68×265 mm (2.7×10.4 in), L=151 mm (5.9 in) when stowed
Dimensions	Weight	235 g (8.3 oz)	300 g (11 oz)		500 g (18 oz)
Dimensions	Filter (mm)	—	52		52

=== Gyogyotto 20 (ぎょぎょっと20) ===
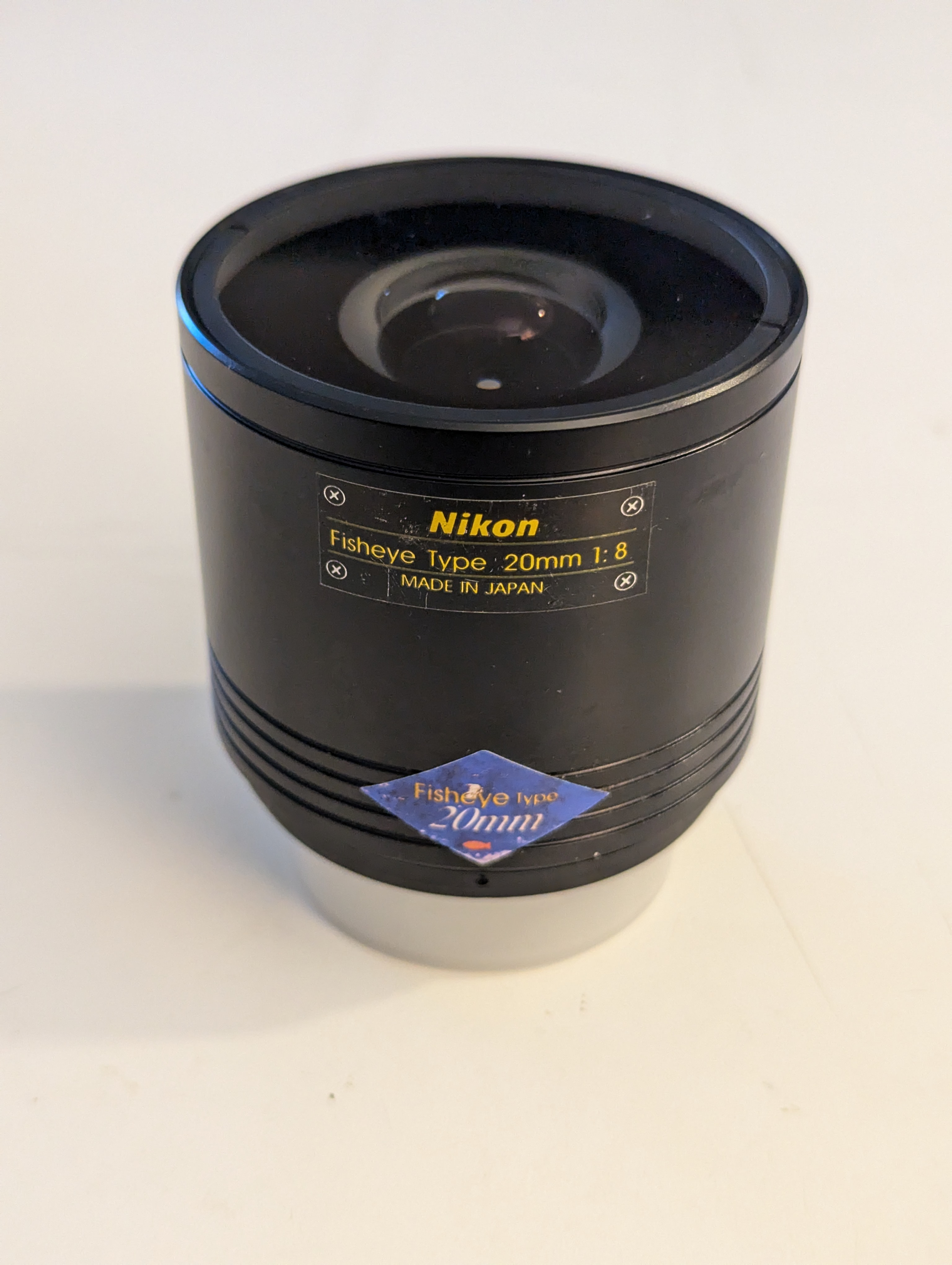
Gyogyotto 20

The Gyogyotto 20 is a full-frame "fisheye type" lens which has an angle of view of 153° across the diagonal. The lens was designed by Kouichi Ohshita and Atsushi Shibayama with input from Haruto Sato. The front (object-facing) lens element is a plano-concave lens, followed by a cemented group consisting of a thick meniscus element and convex element.

A reviewer for Watch Impress, using the lens on a Nikon D100 in 2005, was disappointed with the closest focusing distance; a later review from 2023 suggested this shortcoming could be remedied by using the lens on a mirrorless camera with mount adapter featuring a focusing helicoid.

=== Gugutto Macro / Fuwatto Soft (ぐぐっとマクロ / ふわっとソフト) ===
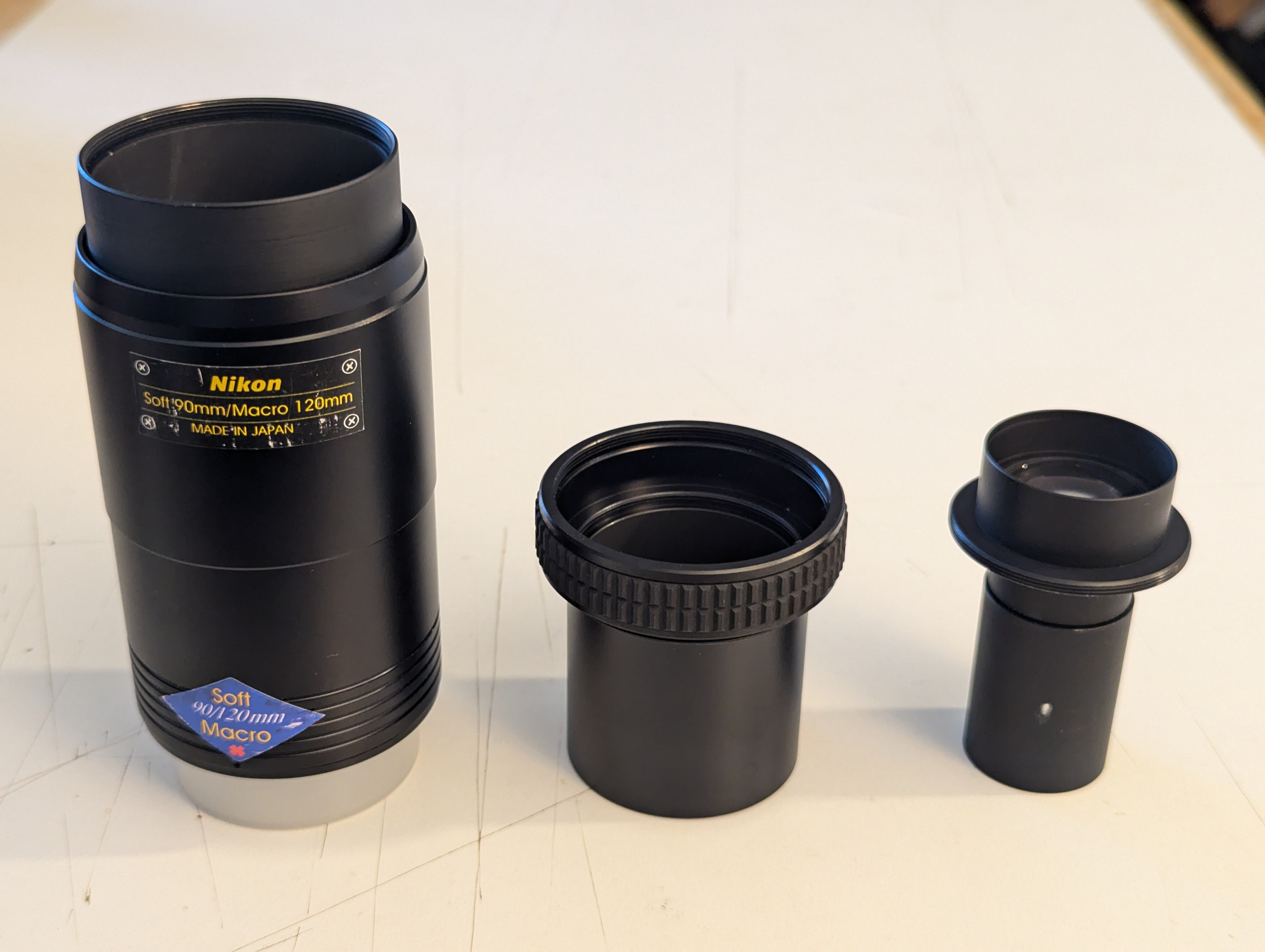
Gugutto Macro / Fuwatto Soft, disassembled; L–R: lens body, focusing barrel, optical assembly

The Gugutto Macro and Fuwatto Soft were designed by Kouichi Ohshita. Both use the same lens body and cemented lens doublet; for the macro lens, the convex side faces the object, while for the soft focus lens, the doublet is reversed so the concave side faces the object.

The Gugutto Macro is designed as a classic two-group telephoto, with a positive (converging) lens arranged ahead of a negative (diverging) lens to shorten the overall length. The standard configuration has the meniscus lens threaded onto the cemented doublet group, then the combined optical assembly, which has three elements in two groups (3e/2g), is threaded into the rear of the focusing barrel. Maximum reproduction ratio of up to 1/3× is possible. By threading the same 3e/2g assembly into the front of the barrel, the maximum reproduction ratio is extended to 1/1.4×, which Nikon called the "even closer" configuration, or Sarani Gugutto Macro (さらにぐぐっとマクロ). In this way, the focusing barrel serves essentially as an extension tube, and the lens in this configuration is no longer able to be focused to infinity. Reversing the optical assembly is possible so the meniscus element is in front, facing the object, threaded either in the front or rear of the focusing barrel, but this configuration is not documented in the user's manual.

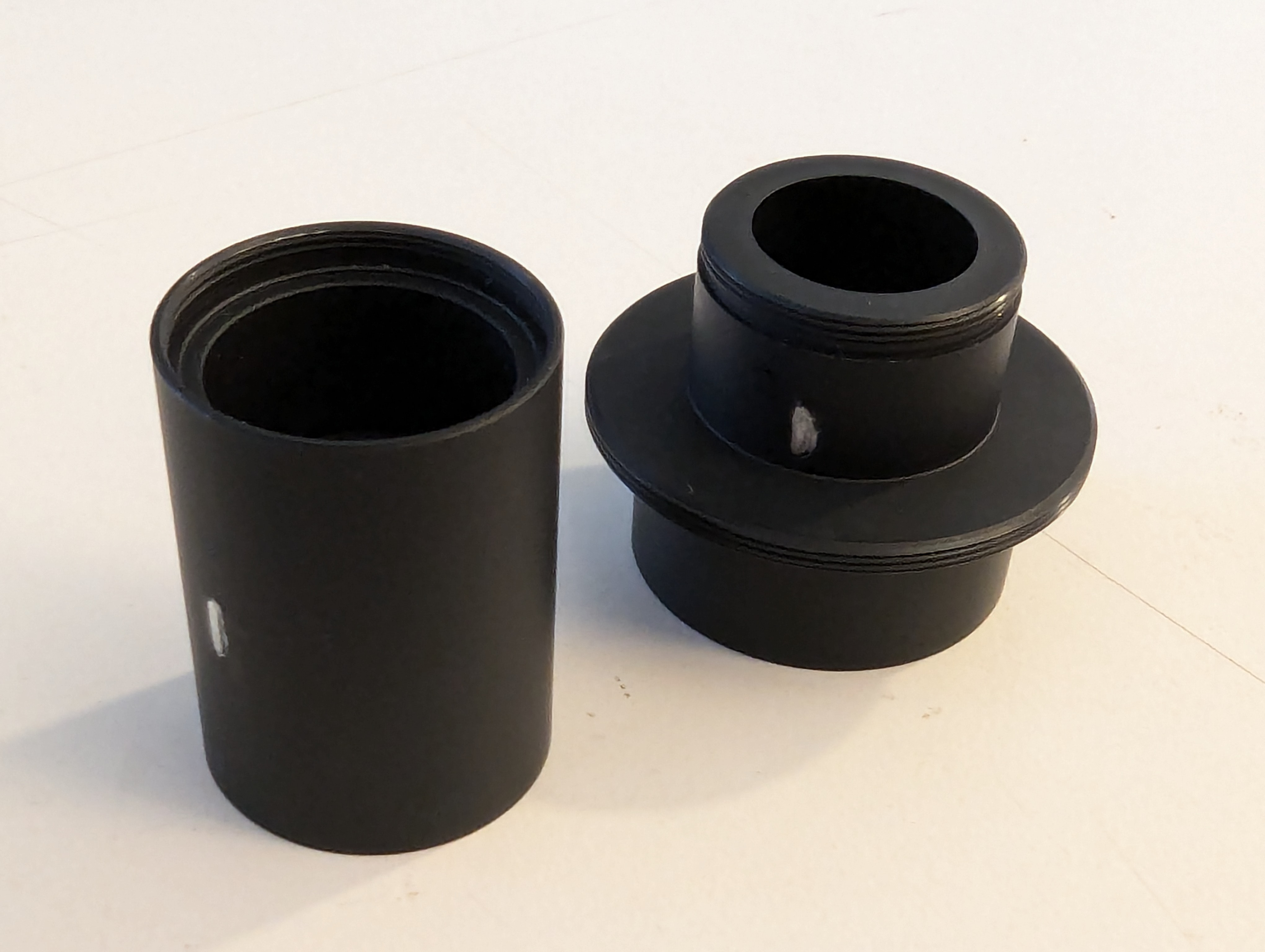
Optical components, disassembled: rear meniscus lens (left) and cemented doublet (right), both with concave side facing up

In the Fuwatto Soft configuration, the rear meniscus lens is removed from the combined 3e/2g optical assembly used in the Gugutto Macro, and the leftover 2e/1g cemented doublet is reversed and threaded into the rear of the focusing barrel; the housing for the single rear meniscus element is sized to be stored inside a standard 135 film cartridge container. The cemented doublet (2e/1g) meniscus lens used in the Fuwatto Soft configuration with the concave side facing the object is similar to the configuration of an unhooded Vestan lens, which achieves its soft focus effect through uncontrolled spherical aberration. The patent suggests two potential soft focus configurations can be achieved with the 2e/1g doublet, with either the convex or concave side facing the object. It is possible to thread the cemented doublet, with its concave side facing the object, into the front of the focusing barrel but again, this is not a documented configuration.

=== Dodotto 400 (どどっと400) ===
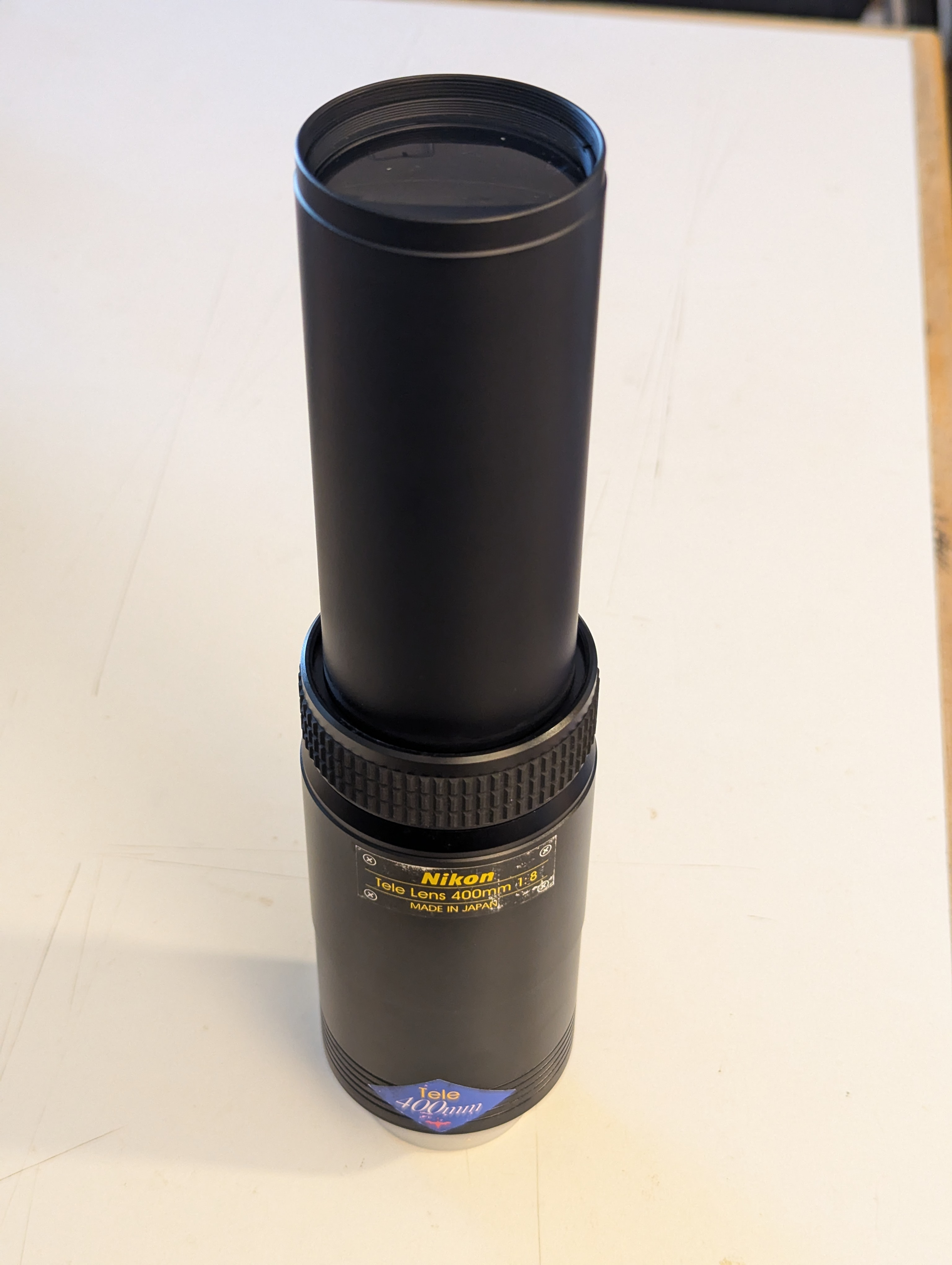
Dodotto 400, assembled

The Dodotto 400 was designed by Kouichi Ohshita using two cemented doublets in a telephoto arrangement, with the front group (facing the object) acting as a converging lens and the rear group diverging. Early prototypes of the Dodotto 400 included a complicated, two-stage mechanical lens barrel, which was dropped in favorable of a manually telescoping barrel; this made the optical design a little more complex, and it was the last lens design of the set to be finalized. The focusing ring serves to secure the lens in its collapsed state; facing the front of the collapsed lens, by turning the focusing ring clockwise, the inner barrel can be unlocked and pulled out and locked into shooting position. The Dodotto 400 has an illumination circle adequate to cover the 645 frame size for 120 film.
