= Autographic film =

System for roll film launched by Kodak in 1914

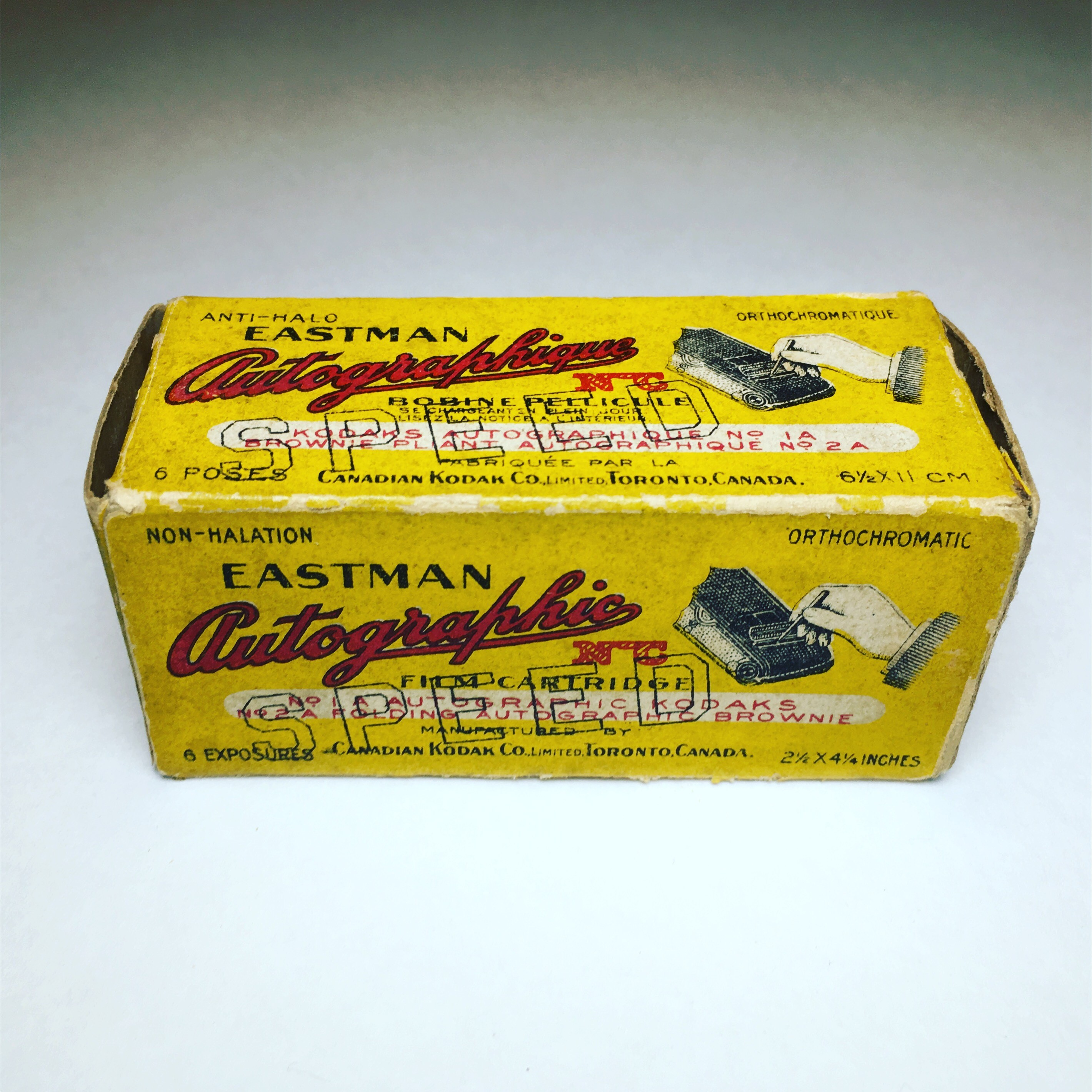
Eastman Autographic Orthochromatic Speed Non-Curling Non-Halation Film (Expired: March 1st 1920)

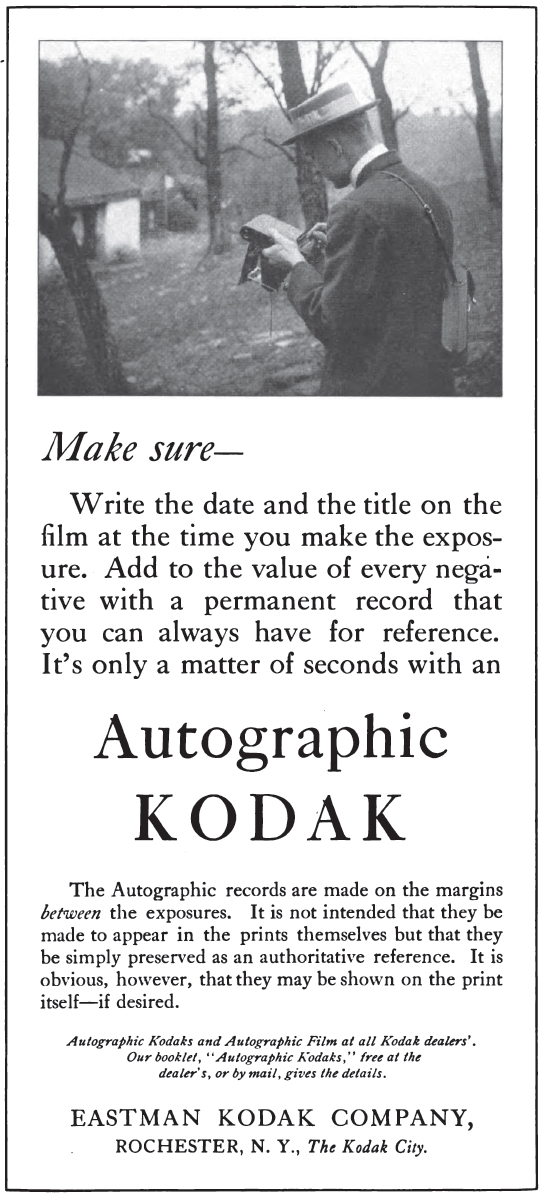
1915 magazine ad

The autographic system for roll film was launched by Kodak in 1914, and allowed the photographer to add written information on the film at the time of exposure.

The system was patented by Henry Jacques Gaisman, inventor and safety razor manufacturer. George Eastman purchased the rights for US$300,000. It consisted of a tissue-like carbon paper sandwiched between the film and the paper backing. Text was entered using a metal stylus, and would appear in the margin of the processed print. The system was common on early consumer cameras but became unpopular in the 1920s, and was discontinued in 1932.

Kodak's autographic films had "A" prepended to the film size designation. Thus, standard 122 film would be labeled "122" and autographic 122 would be "A122". Autographic roll film sizes were A116, A118, A120, A122, A123, A126, A127, and A130. The autographic feature was marketed as having no extra charge. In 1915, Kodak also sold upgrade autographic backs for their existing cameras.

== Some cameras using the autographic system ==
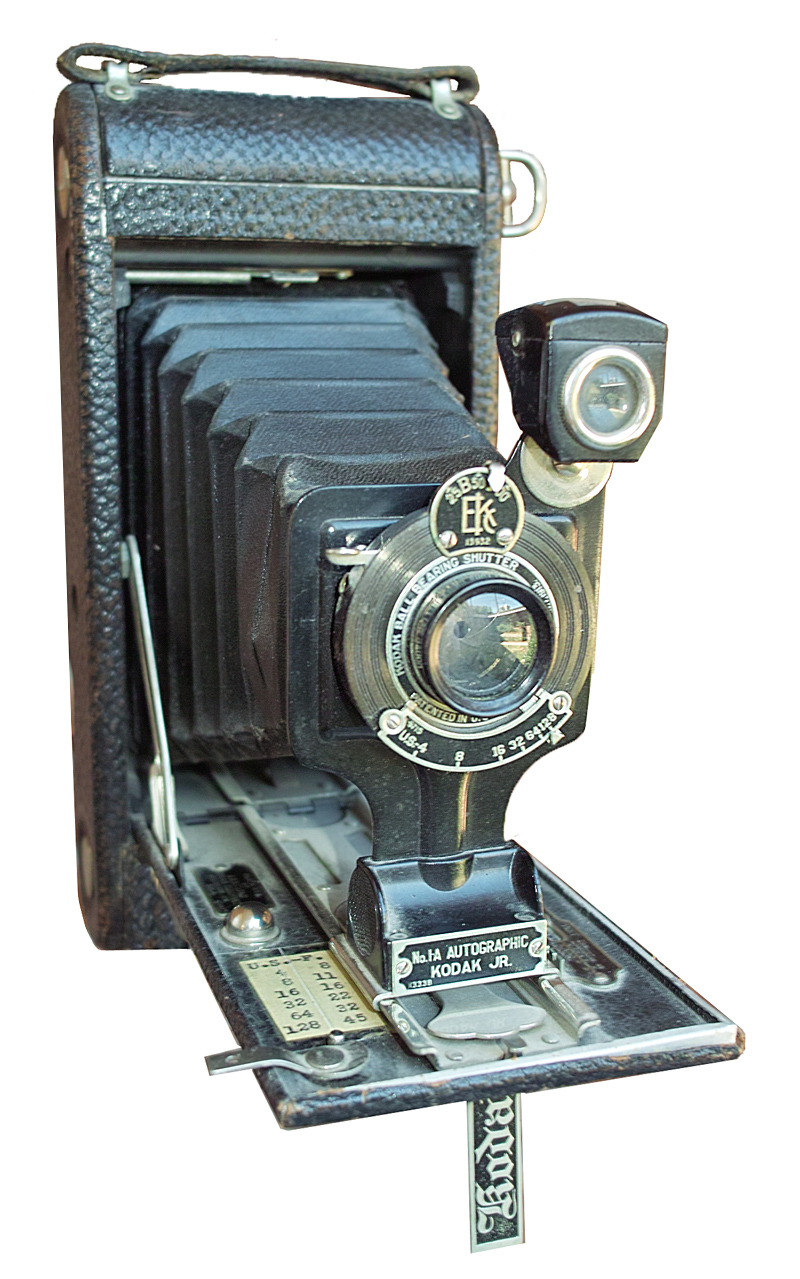
No.1-A Autographic Kodak Jr. camera, made 1914–1927, uses size 116 (or A116) film.

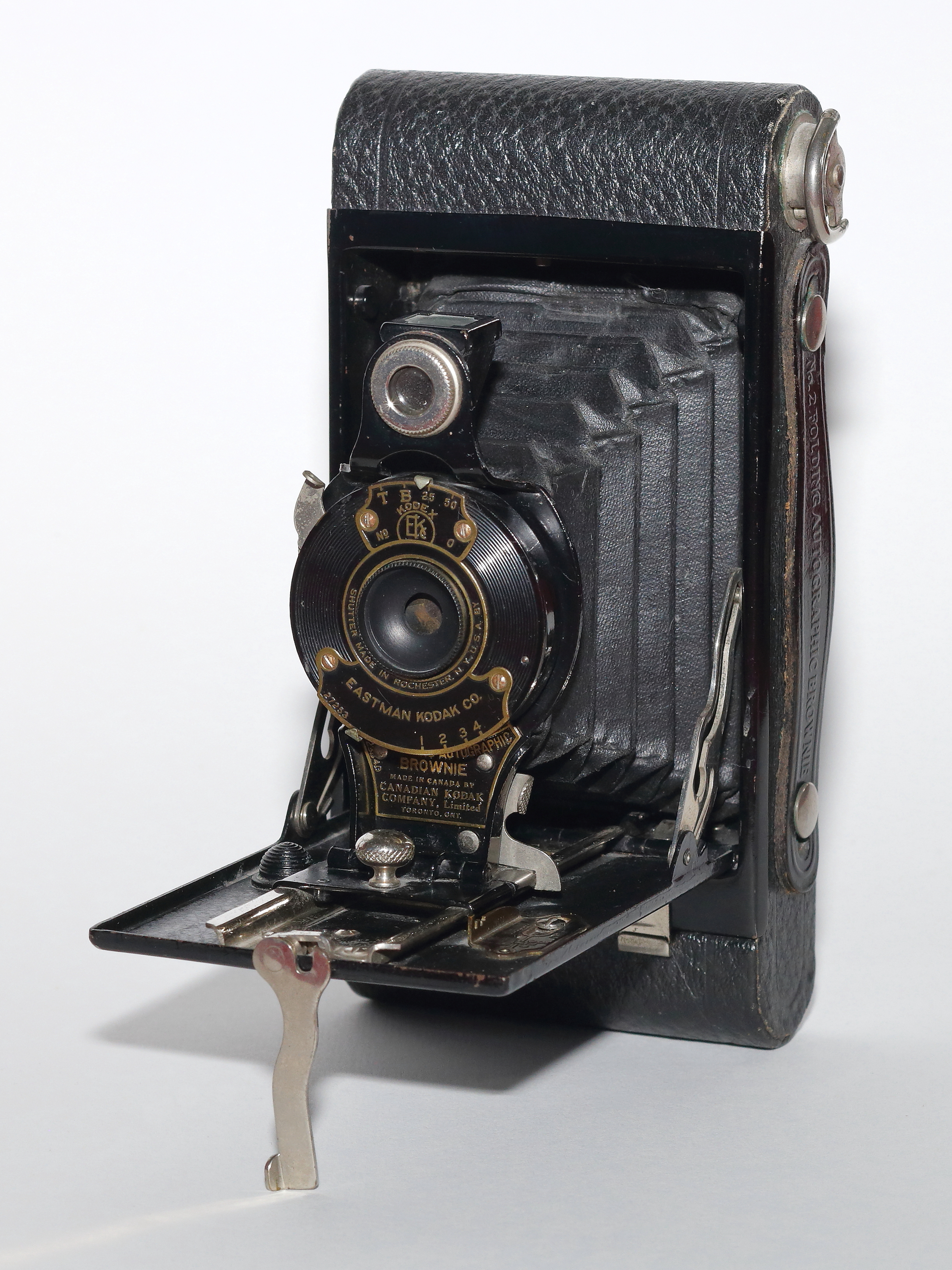
No. 2 Folding Autographic Brownie is a folding camera for type 120 autographic film. More than half a million were sold between 1915 and 1926.

The lid and the stylus are visible on the back of Charles Lindbergh's Eastman Kodak Vest Pocket Autographic Camera

== See also ==
- Film format
