= Henry Jacques Gaisman =

American philanthropist and inventor

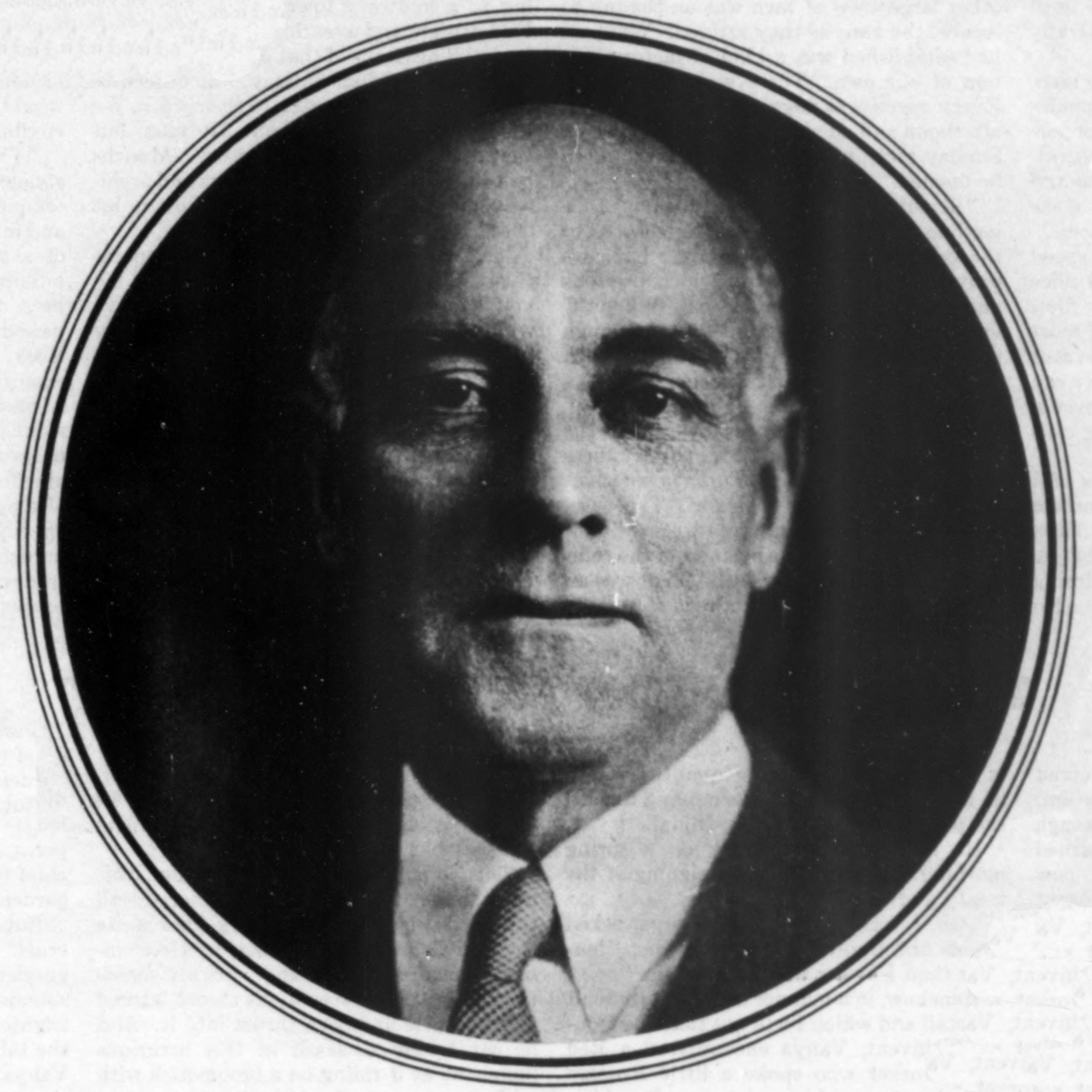
- Born: December 5, 1869; Memphis, Tennessee, U.S.
- Died: August 6, 1974 (aged 104); White Plains, New York, U.S.
- Occupations: Inventor; Businessman
- Spouse: Catherine Vance (m. 1952)

Henry Jacques ("Jack") Gaisman (December 5, 1869 – August 6, 1974) was an American inventor and philanthropist, who patented a lucrative form of safety razor, the autographic camera, and over one thousand other ideas which benefited common items such as swivel chairs, men's belts and carburetors.

== Early days ==
Henry J. Gaisman was born in 1869 in Memphis, Tennessee, the youngest of four children. His father, Jacques Gaisman (né Geissmann), was an immigrant originally from Dornach, a French village in the Alsace region bordering Germany near Mulhouse, who fled worsening political pressures and immigrated to New Orleans in 1852. Jacques married Sarah in Memphis, Tennessee in 1864, and died in there during a Yellow Fever epidemic in 1872. Sarah then moved the family to Cincinnati, Ohio, where Henry spent some of his early childhood helping support his family by working as a newsboy.

== Career ==
Already at age 9 Henry had invented a medium for street car advertising. Unable to afford the lengthy schooling required to study mechanical engineering and chemistry (his first interests), he left school at 13 to work various odd jobs. At 16 he invented the glass-enclosed bulletin boards commonly used in hotel lobbies. He then worked briefly as a leather worker, then a leather dealer, and in 1894 moved to New York City, where he sold his first financially successful invention, a belt that wouldn't slip. Later, he invented the safety razor, an invention which propelled him to wealth.

His safety razor was patented in May and July 1904, and was initially sold by the Auto Strop Safety Razor Company, a competitor to razor and blade manufacturer Gillette Safety Razor Company, founded by Mr. King C. Gillette. When Gillette appropriated Gaisman's technology Auto Strop sued the Gillette Razor Corporation for patent infringement, which Gillette resolved by merging the two companies. When Mr. Gaisman came on board at the Gillette corporation, he found financial reporting errors which shook investor confidence and briefly caused the Gillette stock to drop. When Mr. Gillette eventually died at age 77, Mr. Gaisman went on to become the leader of the Gillette Razor Corporation.

In 1914, he also developed the autographic camera, a process where photographers could write small notes on the edge of their negatives. The rights to this process were purchased by George Eastman (of Eastman Kodak) in 1914 for the sum of $300,000.

After his razorblade patent ran out in 1921, Gaisman continued to develop newer razorblade technologies. On November 21, 1922, he applied for a new patent on a double-edged safety blade, which would not fit in Gillette handles. On June 28, 1927, he was granted the patent for this newer "Probak" razor, and in 1928 he founded the Probak Razor Corporation.

== Personal life ==
=== As bachelor ===
In 1932, at age 63 and still a bachelor, he moved from his Park Avenue apartment home to Hartsdale, New York, after purchasing 106 acres (0.43 km^{2}) of land from George Christiancy, a stockbroker and former U.S. Minister to Peru. Shortly thereafter, he purchased 16 acres (65,000 m^{2}) of adjacent undeveloped land from the Healy estate, the neighboring A.P. Theobald estate, and a tract from the Kuzmier estate, giving him a total of 136 acres (0.55 km^{2}) along Ridge Road in Hartsdale.

The Business Week magazine of 26 November 1930 described Mr. Gaisman as "... of medium height, of benign mien. He lives in a Park Avenue apartment in a state of contented batchelorhood [sic] ... He has voiced doubts as to whether any woman could live with him. The doubt applies to unconventional working habits and not to personal disposition. If he gets an idea in the middle of the night there is no more sleep for him. Like Gillette, Gaisman is an incurable inventor. Also like Gillette, Gaisman possesses a quality notoriously lacking in most inventors – shrewd executive ability." He retired from the Gilette Safety Razor Corporation in 1938, at which time he was reputed to be worth more than 25 million dollars.

=== Latter days and marriage ===
In 1948, while in Mount Sinai Hospital in New York City for routine medical care, he met Catherine ("Kitty") Vance (1919 - May 1, 2010), then a 29-year-old nursing supervisor and native of New Rochelle. Four years later, on 18 April 1952, at age 82, he married Catherine, then aged 33. Initially, the couple considered selling their land to Westchester County to build a new site for the Westchester Community College. However, the couple changed their plans before the deal could be completed, and despite County threats to take the land through condemnation, he and his wife Catherine passed the title for their land to the New York Archdiocese in 1957 for $600,000, with the provision the Gaismans could live on the estate as long as they wished. (The Westchester Community College was eventually built on the 364-acre (1.47 km^{2}) John Augustine Hartford estate on Grasslands Road in Valhalla.)

The estate in Hartsdale was used as a home for retired Catholic nuns, and has since been purchased by the town of Greenburgh, where it has been turned into a nature preserve. Retired nuns continue to live on the estate today.

In 1971, at age 101, Mr. Gaisman was quoted in Who Said what (and When, and Where, and How) as saying, "I don't think that what anyone does is worth too much attention. I like to know what's going on. I want to be alive."

=== Death ===
Mr. Gaisman died in White Plains, New York, in 1974, at age 104, and was buried at the Gates of Heaven cemetery in Hawthorne. His wife continued to live on the estate until 1995, when she moved to Connecticut to live near family. On May 1, 2010 she died at Mount Sinai Hospital at the age of 91. She was buried beside her husband.
