= Diana (camera) =

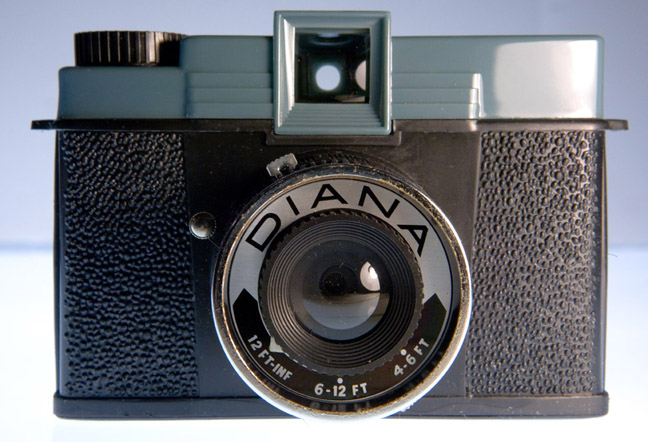
- Diana camera

Overview
- Maker: Great Wall Plastic Factory, Lomographische AG
- Type: Toy camera

Lens
- F-numbers: f/11, f/13, f/19

Sensor/medium
- Sensor type: Film
- Sensor size: Originally 42 mm × 42 mm
- Recording medium: 120 film, 35mm, Fuji Instax Square

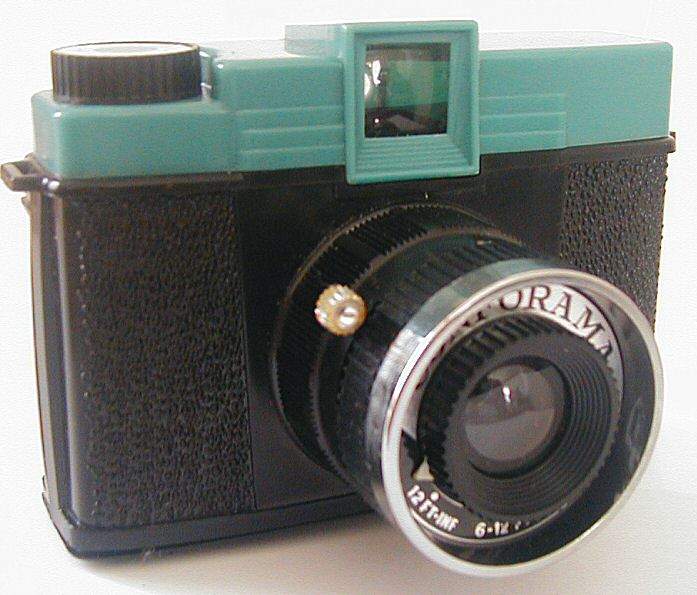
Diana camera branded with Conforama

The Diana camera is a plastic-bodied camera that originally used 120 roll film. Contemporary variants use 35mm film or 110 format, and digital versions are also available. The camera has a simple plastic meniscus lens. In recent years, the Diana has been revived and marketed by Lomography as a tool for producing soft-focus, impressionistic photographs reminiscent of early 20th-century Pictorialist art photography.

Like other low-cost cameras, the Diana faces limitations such as light leaks and film advance issues. Some of these characteristics are used for artistic effect, often to produce a slightly blurred composition that can provide a 'dreamlike' or impressionistic quality.

== History ==
The Great Wall Plastic Factory of Kowloon, Hong Kong, began manufacturing the Diana in the early 1960s, with the majority of production exported to the United States and the United Kingdom. In the United States, the Diana was imported by the Power Sales Company of Willow Grove, Pennsylvania. During the 1960s, the Power Sales Company sold cases of 144 Diana cameras at about 50 cents U.S. per unit to retailers and promotional merchandisers.

Most Diana cameras were given away or sold for nominal sums as novelties or prizes at fairs, carnivals, product promotions, raffles, or other events. For a time, it was also advertised for sale by mail order in various periodicals.

Demand for the Diana fell with the development of higher quality, inexpensive consumer cameras such as the Kodak Instamatic, which coincided with the decline in popularity of roll film.

Production of the original Diana ceased at some point in the 1970s. Manufacturers in Hong Kong, Taiwan, and China continued to produce structurally similar 35mm box cameras for promotional markets through the 1980s and beyond.

The Diana is currently being sold by Lomography (company) as the "Diana F+" in the original 120 format, as well as "Diana Mini" in 35mm format, and the "Diana Baby 110". The current iteration of the medium-format Diana F+ is a system camera with interchangeable lenses, flashes, and film backs. Lomography makes Diana lens adapters for several major DSLR systems, including the Canon EOS, Nikon F-mount, and Micro Four Thirds.

== Characteristics ==
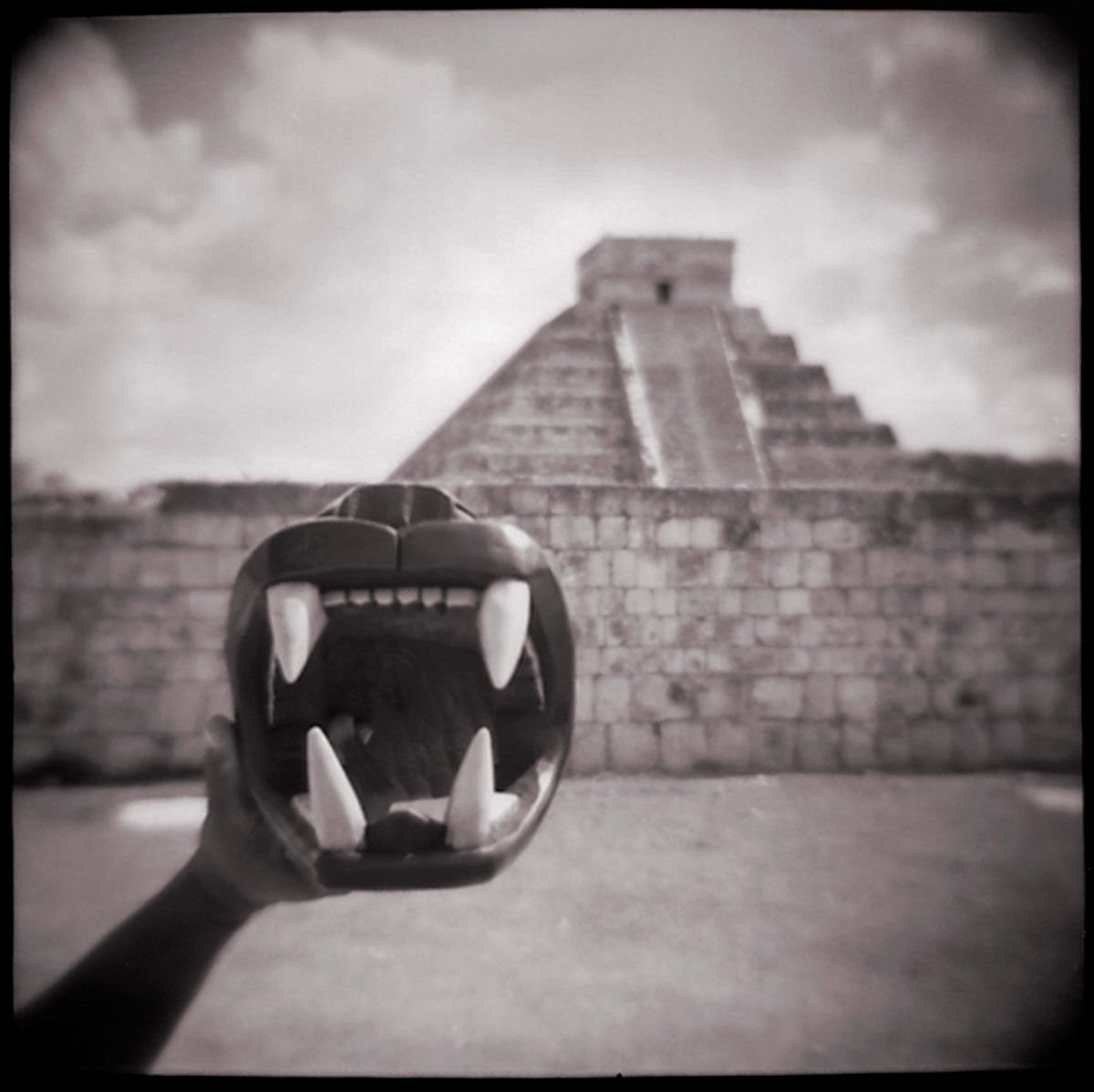
A photograph (Chichen Itza, Yucatan, Mexico) taken with a Diana camera. Seen here are the typical vignetting and blurring effects that are characteristics of a Diana image.

The Diana is a box camera of simple construction that includes a mechanical film advance, a spring-loaded shutter, and a plastic viewfinder. It is constructed primarily of phenolic plastics of the type commonly found in toys imported from Asia in the 1960s.

The Diana's lens produces an image circle which only marginally covers the diagonal of a film frame. This often produces images with pronounced vignetting.

Because of wide variations in production quality, combined with slight gaps in the camera body latching mechanism, Diana cameras are prone to leaks onto the exposed film. This can be prevented by sealing the seams of the camera with light-proof tape after loading the film.

The Diana's plastic meniscus can cause a low contrast resolution, atypical colour rendition, chromatic aberration, and blurred images. The film spool can become loose or out of place when winding the film to the next frame. The rudimentary film advance and shutter mechanisms may also result in images that are not properly centred or exposed. The shutter speed is often variable because of manufacturing defects and can range from 1/200 to 1/30 of a second. Because the Diana has no shutter lock, multiple exposures can be made by releasing the shutter repeatedly without advancing the film.

== Variants ==
In addition to the 'Diana' labeled cameras, there are over 50 similar variants of the basic design, some of which may have been produced by other factories or manufacturers. The camera was sold under a variety of model names, often relabeling an existing product. In other cases, slight modifications were added. Some variations use slightly different materials, while other models include a 'bulb' setting for time exposures. Other variants incorporate a 6×6cm negative size (like the Diana Deluxe), have provisions for different controls, or separate flash illumination. The 3-aperture version of the classic Diana and Diana clones has apertures of f/11, f/13, and f/19, and it takes 32mm clip-on filters. The Diana Deluxe variant offers f/9, f/16, and f/22 and takes a 46mm–49mm step-up ring, which is unusual for a low-end camera.

In 2007 Lomography introduced the Diana+, a reproduction made by dismantling an original 1960s Diana and reconstructing it piece by piece. It has 'N' (normal) and 'B' (bulb) shutter settings and takes either 12 frames of 5.2 × 5.2 cm or 16 frames of 4.2 × 4.2 cm, the classic Diana format, on 120 film; it also allows multiple and partial exposures and has a pinhole function and an 'endless panorama' mode. The Diana F+ followed as a later version. The Diana F+ can be used with the Diana Instant Back+, the Diana 35mm Back+, as well as the splitzer to produce images with strong vignetting and distinctive low-fidelity effects typical of toy cameras.

A digital version of the camera was produced in 2014 by Greg Dash of Cyclops Cameras. The project was funded through the crowdfunding platform Indiegogo, allowing Dash to produce a limited run of 1000 digital Diana cameras (called the 'Rhianna').

== Photographers and art schools ==
Although several attributes of the Diana are generally thought undesirable in a camera, various photographers and art photography schools have intentionally utilised these characteristics to produce photographs with interesting or artistic effects. The San Francisco Art Institute incorporated the Diana into its photography curriculum beginning in 1967–1968, emphasising artistic vision over technical camera capabilities. Later, other schools picked up the idea, including Ohio University in Athens County, Ohio. The use of the Diana in this role achieved a new level of fame when the camera was utilised by American photographer and former Ohio University photography student Nancy Rexroth in an influential 1976 photographic exhibit and book entitled 'IOWA'.

== See also ==
- Kodak Brownie
- Holga
- Amy Blakemore
