= Leica Vario-Elmarit-SL 24-90mm F2.8-4 ASPH =

- Maker: Leica
- Lens mount(s): Leica SL

Technical data
- Type: Zoom
- Focus drive: Stepper motor
- Focal length: 24-90mm
- Aperture (max/min): f/2.8 - f/4.0
- Close focus distance: 0.30 metres (0.98 ft)
- Max. magnification: 0.14
- Construction: 18 elements in 15 groups

Features
- Manual focus override: No No
- Weather-sealing: Yes Yes
- Lens-based stabilization: Yes Yes
- Aperture ring: No No

Physical
- Diameter: 88 millimetres (3.5 in)
- Weight: 1,140 grams (2.51 lb)
- Filter diameter: 82mm

History
- Introduction: 2015

The Leica Vario-Elmarit-SL 24-90mm F2.8-4 ASPH is an interchangeable standard zoom lens for Leica L mount, announced by Leica on October 20, 2015.

A review in PCMag UK praised the lens for its sharpness, low distortion and weatherproof, optically stabilised design, while also drawing attention to its vignetting of up to 5.5 stops at 24mm.
