= Michelle Bates =

American photographer, teacher and author

Michelle Bates is an American photographer, teacher and author who specializes in images taken with toy cameras. She has been exhibiting her work, teaching classes and workshops, and writing about photography since 1991 .

Bates learned about Holga cameras at the Maine Photographic Workshops in 1991, and she has used them for almost all of her fine art photographs since that time. Because of her extensive use of toy cameras and her knowledge of other photographers who also use them, Bates has been called a "well-respected evangelist" for Holgas … the "Holga Queen", "The High Priestess of Holganess" and "The Fairy Godmother of the Holga."

One of the hallmarks of her work is her use of the inherent qualities of cameras with inexpensive plastic lens while conveying a clear artistic style. She says she prefers "quirky subjects, like carnivals and animals" but also likes "to push the boundaries and try new subjects". Bates prints all of her own work in a darkroom using a hand-cut negative carrier that she made nearly 20 years ago.

Bates has given lectures on plastic and toy cameras to groups all over the world, including the Society for Photographic Education, San Francisco Camerawork, the Center for Creative Photography, the Photographic Center Northwest and at TEDxRainier in 2011. She has also taught classes at the International Center of Photography, the Newspace Center for Photography and the Maine Media Workshops. Her book Plastic Cameras: Toying with Creativity (ISBN 0240814215) is now in its second edition.

== See also ==
- Holga
- Toy camera
