= Middle East Materials Project =

Founded in 1987, the Middle East Materials Project (MEMP) works to provide digital and microform copies of rare, hard-to-obtain, and expensive research materials related to Middle Eastern Studies. The main goal is to obtain delicate and deteriorating documents in order to digitally record and preserve them, so that researchers may find materials not common to other research libraries. MEMP is coordinated through the Center for Research Libraries in cooperation with the Middle East Librarians Association (MELA). Members participate in cooperative cataloging of materials that require specialized linguistic and cultural knowledge. MEMP's coverage includes Arab countries, Israel, Turkey, Iran, as well as other areas with related materials that do not have a functioning materials project.

MEMP's collection includes over 100 newspaper titles in Arabic, Turkish, and English, a large number of Sudanese and Turkish papers, microfilms of documents about the Middle East from the Library of Congress, and microfilms from the Cosro Chaqeri Collection of Iranian Left-wing Materials. MEMP has also worked with Fawzy W. Khoury and Michelle Bates to compile the "Middle East in Microform: a Union List of Middle Eastern Microforms in North American Libraries" (University of Washington Libraries, 1992), a revised and expanded version of "National Union Catalog of Middle Eastern Microforms" (University of Washington Libraries, 1989).
