= Jonathan Green (photographer) =

American photographer and historian (born 1939)

Jonathan Green (born September 26, 1939) is an American writer, historian of photography, curator, teacher, museum administrator, photographer, filmmaker and the founding Project Director of the Wexner Center for the Arts. A recognized authority on the history of American photography, Green's books Camera Work: A Critical Anthology (1973) and American Photography: A Critical History 1945–1980 (1984) are two notable commentaries and frequently referenced and republished accounts in the field of photography. At the same time Green's acquisitions, exhibitions and publications consistently drew from the edges of established photographic practice rather than from its traditional center. He supported acquisitions by socially activist artists like Adrian Piper and graffiti artist Furtura 2000, and hosted exhibitions on Rape, AIDS, new feminist art, and the work of photographer, choreographer and dancer Arnie Zane, the Diana camera images of Nancy Rexroth, the Polaroids and imitation biplanes of folk artist Leslie Payne, and the digital photographic work of Mexican photographer Pedro Meyer. This alternative focus help prime Green and the competition jury to choose an unconventional, deconstructive architect, Peter Eisenman, previously known primarily as a teacher and theorist, as the architect for the Wexner Center for the Arts. Green has held professorial and directorial positions at Massachusetts Institute of Technology, Ohio State University, and University of California, Riverside.

== Early life ==
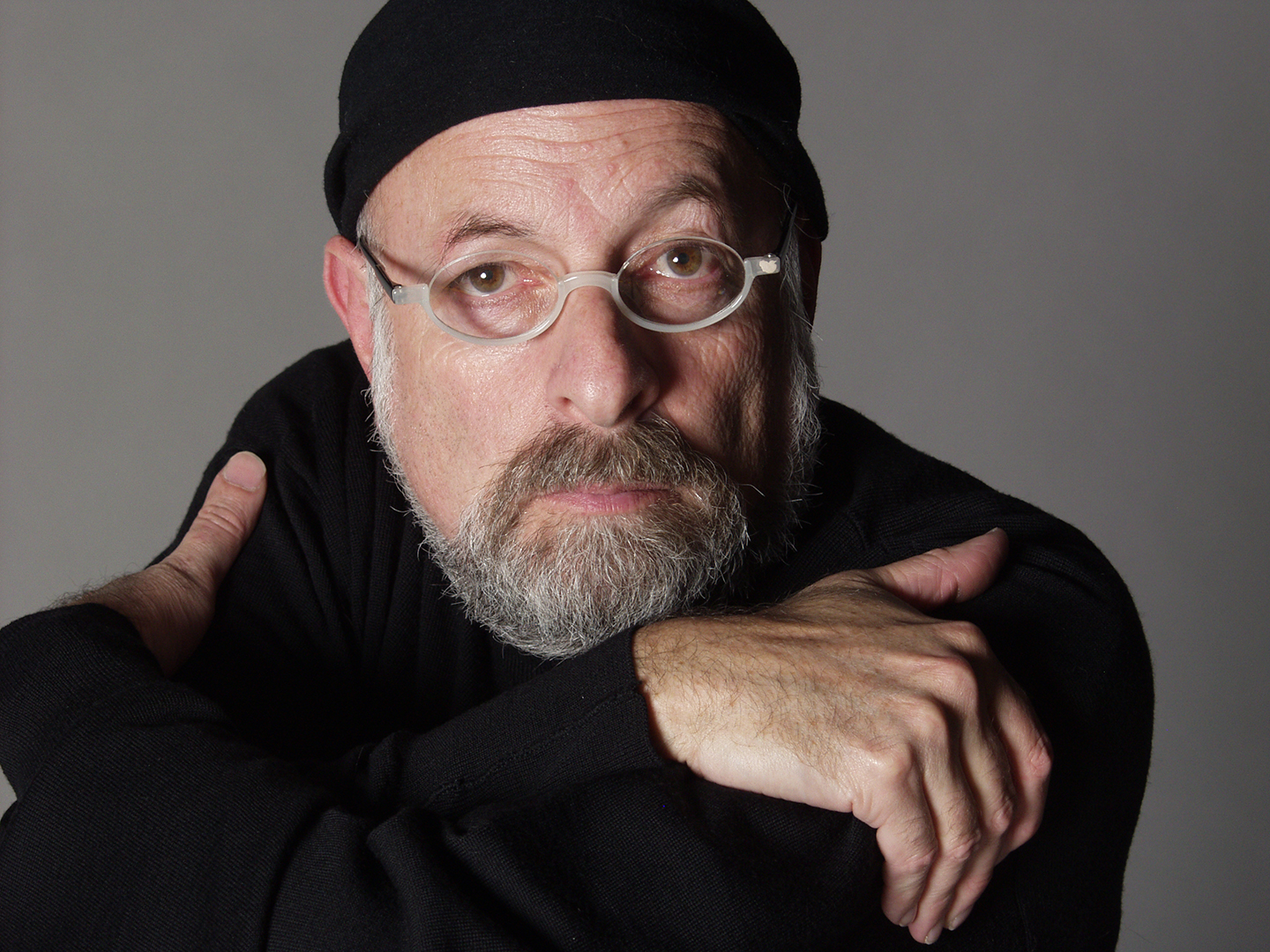

Jonathan Green was born to Jewish parents in Troy, New York, where his father held his first rabbinical pulpit. His father, Rabbi Alan. S. Green was a prominent reform rabbi active in the reform leadership organization known for his contributions to the reform movement's liturgy, and for his popularization of rabbinical thought in such books as Sex, God, and the Sabbath, The Mystery of Jewish Marriage. Green's mother, Frances, was a social worker who while in Palestine in the mid 1930s worked with Henrietta Szold in Youth Aliya.

== Education and university affiliation ==
Green grew up in Shaker Heights, Ohio, and attended Shaker Heights public schools. He studied at the Massachusetts Institute of Technology 1958–1960; Hebrew University, Jerusalem, 1960–61; Brandeis University, Near Eastern and Judaic Studies and English Literature, BA, Phi Beta Kappa, Magna Cum Laude 1963; Harvard University, English Literature, as a Danforth Fellow, AM, 1967. He taught with photographer Minor White at MIT from 1968–1976, becoming acting director of the MIT Creative Photography Laboratory and Gallery at White's retirement; then Professor of Photography and Cinema and Founding Project Director Wexner Center for the Arts, Ohio State University, 1976–1990; followed by Professor of the History of Art and Photography, and director of the California Museum of Photography and executive director, UCR ARTSblock, University of California, Riverside, 1990–2015.

== Early writings ==
As a freshman at MIT in May 1960, Green was awarded third place in the MIT-wide Boit Essay Prize competition for a study of three poems by Dylan Thomas. In Spring 1964 his translation from the Hebrew of Fahrenheim by Shmuel Yosef Agnon was published in the Harvard-Radcliffe literary magazine Mosaic. After taking a workshop with Minor White he began to write for Aperture Quarterly, publishing commentaries on the Daybooks of Edward Weston, 1967; Harry Callahan's El Mochuelo and MOMA monographs, 1968; and Bruce Davidson's East 100th Street, 1971.

== Architectural photography ==
=== Boston MBTA Subway Murals 1965 ===
In 1965 based on a series of high contrast photographs Green had made in Israel and Europe, Peter Chermayeff and Lou Bakanowsky of the architectural firm Cambridge Seven Associates commissioned Green along with photographer Len Gittleman to take photographs to be installed as large-scale silkscreen, porcelain enamel, black and white murals for Cambridge Seven Associates' newly renovated 1967 Boston MBTA stations at Copley, Arlington, and Park. These murals showed iconic buildings and landscapes surrounding each station such as the Arlington Street Church and the Boston Public Gardens. They were on view for over 20 years.

=== Ezra Stoller 1967–1968 ===
In 1967 Green moved to Mamaroneck, New York, to work with architectural photographer Ezra Stoller. During his time with Stoller and then later on-his-own in Boston, Green photographed projects for a range of noteworthy architects and firms including Acorn Structures; Benjamin Thompson; Cambridge 7 Associates; Donlyn Lyndon; Edward Larrabee Barnes; Haines, Lundberg & Waehler; Hugh Stubbins; J. Timothy Anderson; Paul Rudolf; Richard Meier; and The Architects Collaborative. Green was also commissioned in the early 70s by the Philadelphia Museum of Art to document installations of their photography exhibitions, including exhibitions by Paul Strand, Minor White, and Jerry Uelsmann.

Green's architectural photographs were published in many books and journals including 25 Years of Record Houses, Progressive Architecture, A Field Guide to Modern American Architecture, Architectural Record, Architecture and Urbanism (Japan), Baumeister (Germany), Bay State Architect, Better Homes and Gardens, House Beautiful, New England Architect, Record Houses of the Year. Green's photographs were used as covers for issues of Progressive Architecture and Architectural Record.

== MIT 1968–1976 ==
=== Minor White and Aperture ===
When Green was at Harvard a classmate introduced him to Minor White who had recently been invited by MIT to start a new photography program. While working for Ezra Stoller in Mamaroneck, Green began to submit articles for White's Quarterly journal of photography, Aperture. In 1968 White learned that he could add another teacher to the Creative Photo Laboratory, which was a division of MIT's School of Architecture on the condition that the new instructor could teach architectural photography. White invited Green to apply and in fall 1968 Green was hired at MIT.

=== Camera Work ===
White and Aperture managing editor and publisher Michael Hoffman encouraged Green to consider a larger project than the short articles he had previously submitted. Aperture had begun to publish books as well as the Quarterly, and they suggested Green prepare a careful study of Stieglitz's magazine, Camera Work, 1903–1917. Green spent many hours in the Boston Public Library reviewing original issues of Camera Work and conceived of a sumptuous book that would translate the spirt of the original format into contemporary terms. He goal was to reveal how Stieglitz's periodical "helped transformed he artistic sensibility of the nineteenth century into the artistic awareness of the present day." Green and Hoffman worked with designer Stephen Korbet and typographer Herb Lubalin to achieve the final look. The publication was supported by a grant from the National Endowment for the Arts and the Florence V. Burden Foundation.

Camera Work: A Critical Anthology was awarded the Art Librarians Society of North America's Publishing Award for Best Art Book of 1973. They called it, "A perfect book... based on quality of binding, typography and paper, excellence of bibliographical apparatus such as indices and bibliography, and the quality and placement of illustrations." Hilton Kramer in the New York Times Book Review wrote, "The volume which Jonathan Green has now assembled is exemplary in every respect. His introductory essay and his lengthy notes, together with his painstaking indexes and other editorial apparatus, are a model of what a book of this sort should be—a prefect guide not only to a crucial publication but to a career and a period." And Peter Bunnell, in the Print Collector's Newsletter wrote, "Green clarifies the vision behind the publication and the virtues and failings of the movement it documented. His period breakdown of the magazine's contents is insightful...The format is superb...With the publication of Green's book, one major area of study in the field is in book form."

=== The Snapshot ===
Having dealt with a historical photographic classic, Green next turned to contemporary photographers with the intent of expanding Aperture's traditional audience. Green asked White to allow him to generate an issue for the Quarterly based not on renowned photographers but on the snapshot. White was certainly equivocal about supporting forms of photography that were not abstract, meditative, or spiritually expressive. White had written, for example, that William Klein "did not photograph a city: he matched with cheap sensational photography the vulgarity of life in all its ugliness." Nonetheless, in 1961, when few other American publishers would touch Robert Frank's The Americans, White agreed to publish three photographs from The Americans in an issue of Aperture that also published 13 earlier Frank photographs. In 1973 White gave Green his blessings and The Snapshot, was released in 1974 both as a Quarterly issue and in book form. It contained portfolios and commentary by photographers never before seen in Aperture such as Garry Winogrand and Lee Friedlander, as well as Robert Frank, who showed his Polaroid 'snapshots.' The book also included commentary on the snapshot by Paul Strand and Lisette Model, plastic Diana camera photos by Nancy Rexroth, and family photographs by Wendy Snyder MacNeil and Emmet Gowin, to name just a few. The first line of Green's introduction states: "The word snapshot is the most ambiguous, controversial word in photography since the word art." In Newsweek, Douglas Davis wrote, "The Snapshot exhaustively documents the symbiotic link between the work of our finest photographers and their first experience of photography—through the family album snapshot." Margaret Weiss in the Saturday Review wrote, "A provocative anthology...Be it ever so humble, the home snapshot has come a long way, baby!" In the journal Exposure Dru Shipman wrote, "What is at issue in this book—and it is a debate carried on politely by the word but with undiplomatic plainness in the pictures—is the transformation of something into a graven image." The Snapshot also became the impetus behind Janet Malcolm's collection of essays Diana & Nikon: Essays on the Aesthetic of Photography, 1980. In Malcolm's essay "On Real and Fake Snapshots," written as a memoir late in her life, Malcolm teases Green: "In his introduction, the editor, Jonathan Green, felt impelled to inform the reader that the photographers represented in the book were 'not snapshooters but sophisticated photographers.' The most sophisticated among them, perhaps, was Rexroth, who used a $1.50 toy camera called the Diana (thus my title) that also came in a model that squirted water when you pressed the shutter."

Yet the reception to The Snapshot was not universally positive. Martha Rosler, whose art and criticism focuses upon issues of politics, class, and gender, wrote, "This collection, mostly of photographers' work with short accompanying remarks, has almost nothing to do with snapshots and represents another step in the attempt by Minor White and others to assimilate all photographs to their particular techno-mystified version of photographic history." And while White was totally behind the project through publication, once it appeared, he drew back. In March, 1975, he wrote to a member of Aperture's board of directors, "I am in rather close contact with a couple of score of...photographers and they have expressed a deep concern over the Snapshot issue....They appreciated the fact that Aperture was attempting to expand and at the same time, felt a loss of contact with their source of inspiration. I am committed to...expanding our audience...but always with our central core related to the esoteric firmly fixed."

=== Visible Language Workshop ===
In the early 1970s MIT Creative Photograph Laboratory instructor Ron MacNeil began to experiment with the printing press as an extension of the darkroom. Because White was convinced that photo chemicals and printing ink did not mix, Green urged MacNeil to find a venue across the street from the Photo Lab in the Department of Architecture's allotted space. Here MacNeil was able to set up a full-size printing press and with newly gained knowledge of computer programming tie the press to digital devices and high-resolution screens. In the process of giving workshops at his new facility MacNeil invited acclaimed MIT Press graphic designer Muriel Cooper to review student work. Cooper was fascinated by MacNeil's project and wanted to stay. She had always pursued an examination of graphic production in multiple media. She thought MacNeil's workshop should be her new home. Green also knew Cooper from having worked with her on the logo for the Photo Lab. Together, as co-founders of a new project, Cooper, MacNeil, and Green, at Cooper's suggestion, designated the new enterprise the "Visible Language Workshop." The VLW is now recognized as a pioneering institution that helped changed the landscape of electronic communication. Green became the administrative director of the group and helped seek funding and support. Green also joined with Patricia Cumming of the Creative Writing Section of the Department of Humanities to host a new course out of VLW, "Words and Images." In 1985 the Visible Language Workshop, the MIT Architecture Machine Group, and the Center for Advanced Visual Studies (CAVS) were combined to form the now renowned MIT Media Lab.

=== Acting Director MIT Creative Photography Lab ===
At MIT Green collaborated with White on White's biannual themes shows, Celebrations, Being Without Clothes, and the controversial Octave of Prayer. At this time Green was also appointed to the position of Associate Editor of Aperture. In 1974 White retired from teaching at MIT and Green was chosen acting director of the Creative Photography Lab. To continue to broaden the sensibility of the Lab's staff, Green invited photographers Tod Papageorge, whom he had met while working on the Snapshot, and Melissa Shook, who recently had been shown at New York's Museum of Modern Art and Metropolitan Museum of Art to join the teaching team which now also included Peter Laytin.

== Ohio State University 1976–1990 ==
=== American Photography: A Critical History ===
Green joined the Photography and Cinema faculty at The Ohio State University in 1976, teaching and directing the department's small Silver Image Gallery. Before he left MIT, Green was approached by James Raimes of Oxford University Press and encouraged to write a book about American photography. Green visualized the book as a series of essays that would begin by establishing a pantheon of American masters (O'Sullivan, Stieglitz, Strand, Evans, Weston, Adams, Steichen) who would define a series of archetypal relationships between photography and the American imagination. The book would identify the dominant forces and the leading figures within each decade and place these photographers—and artists who used photographs, including among others Robert Rauschenberg and Andy Warhol—within the context of America's constantly changing social, political, media, and artistic landscape. The illustrative images in the book would not be presented in traditional portfolio form but rather—in a provocative move—would act as a running commentary across the middle of each page of the book. Green collaborated with photographer James Friedman to produce these juxtapositions of photographs. The publication of the book was supported by a grant from the Polaroid Corporation.

When American Photography: A Critical History 1945–1980 was published in 1984 it was widely reviewed in periodicals including Newsweek, Los Angeles Times, Artweek, The New Criterion and the photographic journals Afterimage, Photo-Eye, and Exposure. It was awarded the American Photographic Historical Society's 1986 Benjamin Citation for achievement in photographic history and was chosen as the 1984 Nikon Book of the Year. Chapters were reprinted in Afterimage, American Images (England), and the 1985 Photography Annual. Excerpts were presented as essays on the website Masters of Photography. As recently as 2021, 37 years after its publication, professor of the history of photography and theory, Mary Warner Marien wrote in Photography: A Cultural History that American Photography is "still influential for its taxonomy of postwar photography."

When the book was published, the art critic Joan Murray, wrote in Artweek, "This book has been waiting to be written. This history of American photography from 1945 to the present has not been dealt with substantially before this provocative and interesting survey by Jonathan Green....There is such a volume of material that even organizing it into chapter headings deserves a merit award. What Green gives us is a vantage point from which to view the era. His research and knowledge contribute to his ability to challenge the reader to see the complexities in somewhat simplified form. American Photography is very readable and certainly needed. It is a valuable addition to photographic literature." Jed Perl wrote in The New Criterion, "In American Photography, Jonathan Green has set out to describe what has happened in the last half-century among photographers and the publications and institutions with which they are involved....Green has, I think, gotten the emphasis right: if the photographers he talks about seem at times overshadowed by all the other things — the magazines, museums, and ideas this is probably a fair picture of a period during which photography has been accepted, generally, as creative art." The language, prose style and verbal accessibility of American Photography was widely lauded. Art critic Lauren Smith wrote, "The text is polished...Green is eloquent and unabashedly straightforward in his assessment...Green's commentary often flows with wonderful grace." Critic, novelist and theorist James Hugunin, who frequently disagreed with Green's assessments, nonetheless writes in Exposure, "Green's discussion is highly intelligent and often insightful. I enjoyed his style of writing, and the discussion never becomes boring, never lapses into mere jargon." Therese Heyman, Senior Curator Oakland Museum, commented to Green, "In the swollen tide of literature in photography your 1984 American Photography stands out to me as the book I most enjoyed reading, finally wishing I had written a chapter of it myself."

=== Wexner Center for the Arts ===
In 1981 Green was appointed director of Ohio State University Gallery following Betty Collings, under whose leadership the gallery received broad visibility for its collection of major contemporary artists. Green greatly respected Collings, but as, Daniel Marcus, Wexner Curator writes in the 2022 Wexner catalog To Begin, Again: A Prehistory of the Wex, 1968–89:

Green proved to be a stalwart champion of progressive causes. Under Green's leadership, the gallery shifted its energies...[and] took an outwardly political stance in both acquisitions and exhibitions, adding works of "political conscience" by Nancy Spero, Adrian Piper, and Rudolf Baranik, among others. In a departure from Collings' program, Green advocated a more populist approach to exhibitions, taking aim at long-running hierarchies and prejudices in the art world. Green's democratic instinct sanctioned an open-ended experiment in distributed authority, offering the institutional apparatus to artists, curators, and cultural workers on the front lines of social struggle. In 1983, the gallery launched what became a sequence of exhibitions channeling the politics of 1980s feminism, anti-imperialism, and queer activism, starting with All's Fair: Love and War in New Feminist Art.

In 1982, Green and Dean of the College of the Arts, Andrew Broekema, received permission from OSU's President, Edward Jennings, to plan for a new arts center. Green laid out concepts for the center in a document titled "OSU/Art." Green worked closely with faculty committees and with Richard Miller, Professor of Architecture, who developed options for a national architectural competition and whose students explored campus locations and potential design strategies. As Marcus noted in the panel discussion for To Begin, Again, "Green played a leading role in the ...buildup to the Wex. [He] was preparing the way for this new expansive paradigm breaking architectural project. But at the same time, he led an exhibition program...that really bears his thumbprint." Green and the university issued a national request for architectural submissions. Five finalists were chosen in October 1982. By then Green's "OSU/Art" had expanded into a full program of requirements that called for a bold building to house an ambitious multidisciplinary contemporary arts center. The program read in part:

The building will be an inviting aesthetic statement: A focal point for the university and the community. The architecture's flexibility will allow its activities always to be contemporary, to adapt to the shape of visual arts activity now and in the 21st century. The building will both accommodate today's needs and anticipate the directions of the future.... The center will be dedicated to experimentation and vanguard artistic activity. It will include activity in the visual arts not only in studio art but in the disciplines of architecture ... computer graphics, electronic music and art, photography, cinema, landscape architecture, music, dance, and theater.

In his essay "Housing a Program: Architecture as Logic, Architecture as Symbol," included in the Rizzoli book, A Center for the Visual Arts: The Ohio State University Competition, Green further expands his vision of the new Center:

The goal of the center is not only to offer the most rigorous support for scholarship in the traditional visual arts, but also to vigorously support the new families of emerging media in which collaboration between technologies and the instrumentalities is the hallmark.

Critic and artist Douglas Davis, who was also a member of the nine-person competition jury, writes in this Rizzoli book, "As a determined user of American museums devoted to 'contemporary' art—as well as a visitor and a commentator—I can attest that it is the first of its kind. It is the first facility to take explicit account in its planning of the incredible transformation—at once social and technological— occurring before our very eyes.

In his essay "What is a Laboratory?" in To Begin Again on the precedents for the Wexner Center, historian and editor Julian Myers-Szupinska points out Green's relationship to the laboratory model: "Jonathan W. Green, the second director of Ohio State's University Gallery of Fine Art and a driving force behind the Wexner Center's statement of purpose, had published an anthology of Stieglitz's journal, Camera Work, in 1973; he was intimately aware of 291's laboratory model and was likely recalling it deliberately in the statement."

Once Eisenman's design was selected, Green worked closely with the architect during the design development phase including traveling to Germany with Eisenman to carefully evaluate several highly lauded new museums: Richard Meier's Frankfurt Museum of Applied Arts (1985) and Abteiberg Museum in Mönchengladbach by Hans Hollein (1982). In 1987 Dean Brokema wrote, "For the past several years Jonathan has maintained a vital gallery program that has achieved recognition for its adventurous planning and for its imaginative combination of both arts and sociological commentary. Further Jonathan has been superb during the time of design development, following a beautifully developed design competition. He has given countless hours to the process of monitoring the evolution of the final plans for the building." In recognition of his input, Green was invited to share the stage with Peter Eisenman and Richard Trott when the Wexner Center received the 32nd Annual Progressive Architecture Design Award in 1985.

In 2022 Harvard Magazine featured a photograph of the Wexner Center and commentary by architectural critic, Joseph Giovannini who wrote, "As culture changed, architecture changed. In or about 1983, a half dozen unusual projects embodied and expressed the cultural shifts.... A university art gallery in Columbus, Ohio...broke through the surface, semaphores of change."

==== Heraldic Projects ====
Before the Wexner Center opened in November 1989 Green devised a sequence of heraldic Wexner Center Preview events, including a pyrotechnic display by artist Dennis Oppenheim, a collaborative installation by sculptor Richard Serra and composer Philip Glass entitled Pink Noise, which accompanied the Philip Glass Ensemble performance of Glass's 5 hour long Music in Twelve Parts, and a performance event, 12 and ¼ degrees, in which Elise Bernhardt, artistic director of New York's Dancing in the Streets, was invited to Columbus to produce a performance that would introduce the community to this new unconventional structure. Here local dancers joined nationally known choreographers Ellen Cornfield, John Giffin, Elizabeth Streb, Stephan Koplowitz, and Susan Hadley with musical performances by accordionist Guy Klucevsek, William Larkin, and Thomas Wells. And iron workers who climbed the building during the day became dancers at the event, emphasizing the idea of the construction site and the new building as laboratory and theater. These preview events were supported by a grant from the Skidmore Owings & Merrill Foundation; The Ohio Arts Council's New Works Program; and the Celia and Mark Tuttle Exhibition Fund of the University Gallery of Fine Art.

==== Pink Noise ====
The Philip Glass/Richard Serra installation curated by Green consisted of a set of high frequency tones originating from different locations in the gallery and reflected around the room by Serra's soft-wall sculpture to form different harmonic combinations. The installation and collaboration are celebrated in the book Green edited and co-designed with Wendy Brown, Pink Noise: Three Conversations Concerning a Collaborative Acoustic Installation which the artist-books distributor Printed Matter deemed "Instant Classic." The book documents hours of conversation. This is the way the conversation begins:

Richard Serra: One of the reasons why I want to do this installation is that I'm more curious about doing things I don't know anything about than things I know about.

Philip Glass: I agree. Because it builds in a lot of other things...But it's possible that we would go in another direction with this thing. We would do something that was less about music and more about hearing as if you were doing something that was less about sculpture and more about space.

Richard Serra: I think what I'm going to do is not primarily construct something that is particularly about the nature of looking and walking but more about the nature of being, walking and listening. Which is something that I haven't done before.

The catalog has been prominently displayed at Centre Pompidou, Paris, at IRCAM, the French institute dedicated to the research of music and sound. Pink Noise could be considered the first formal publication of the Wexner Center.

=== Leslie Payne ===
As Green approached the opening of the Wexner Center, he considered an inaugural exhibition that would resonate with the architecture and dynamism of the new building. Green conceived of an exhibition around of the theme of Flight and began to seek out both art and experiments at the intersection of science and art. He spoke to the Belgium artist Panamarenko about his aeroplanes and visited MIT to see the student team producing the Daedalus, a human powered airplane. Green considered as well using a work already in the OSU collection, Dennis Oppenheim's 1979 Saturn Updraft. Green was also introduced at this time by curator Patricia Brincefield to the work of Leslie Payne, a Black self-taught artist and sculptor who had constructed on his tidewater land in Virginia an 'imitation' airfield with full-size 'imitations' of World War I era biplanes. Payne conceived of his planes not as static models but as a performance piece: he would not only drive the planes around his airfield (they were equipped with engines but they never lifted off the ground) but would also take Polaroid snapshots of the young women who came to take imaginary journeys in the planes. These Polaroids would be combined with texts of the journeys written by the young women and then placed into Payne's Airplane Machine Shop Log Book.

With a team from the OSU Gallery, Green rediscovered, recovered and restored one of the remaining biplanes and other airfield paraphernalia which at Payne's death in 1980 had been left to disintegrate in the sun, rain, and salt-water spray of Chesapeake Bay. The Log Books were found in several art collections. The team then spent several years restoring the artifacts. Though Flight was not the opening Wexner Center exhibition, Green's hope for a Payne exhibition at the Wexner ultimately came to pass in 1991 with the exhibition Leslie Payne: Visions of Flight, an exhibition Green first curated at the California Museum of Photography. 5 Celebrations of Leslie J. Payne, an exhibition catalogue with text by Green was published by the Wexner. The restored plane and related artifacts were also shown at the California Science Center, Los Angeles in 2001 and at the Visionary Art Museum, Baltimore. In 1994, Green assisted the Anacostia Museum at the Smithsonian Institution in permanently acquiring Payne's work. At the Smithsonian Leslie Payne's constructions remain as a part of the museum's holdings and a powerful statement on imagination, race, and identity in America. Green wrote in the Wexner exhibition Catalog:

Through imitation and homemade construction, Leslie Payne, a poor black fisherman, reinvented himself as Airplane Payne, proprietor, manager, and pilot of the Airplane Machine Shop Company. Leslie Payne never intended to present himself as an artist. He seems to have had little conception of that self-conscious activity which we associate with high art. His task was much richer and more complex: the invention of himself as a person. In defiance of anonymity and illiteracy and in resolute indifference to his distance from the centers of power, Payne used his prodigious visual imagination and mechanical talents to conscientiously become the architect, engineer, and pilot that society had disallowed. He understood that he possessed the power in his hands and mind to realize a unified world of being, self-expression and self-discovery. It is in this completeness that the work takes on religious integrity: the genuineness of personal wholeness, the remarkable pleasure of abiding in one's own self-generated paradise.

In the May 2007 Smithsonian Magazine, editor Owen Edwards wrote, "This unique trove of American folk art might have been lost had it not been for a lucky coincidence and the curiosity of an art historian. 'Payne's family probably thought of him as an eccentric, not an artist, so his work was neglected,' says Smithsonian curator Portia James. 'The hero of this story is Jonathan Green.'" In 2021 Green produced a 30 minute film: The Idea of a Plane: Leslie J. Payne's Vision of Flight.

== University of California, Riverside 1990–2015 ==
=== Arnie Zane: Continuous Replay ===
In 1990 Green became Professor of Art and Art History and the Director of the California Museum of Photography at the University of California, Riverside. At UCR choreographer, dance scholar, and chair of the UCR Riverside dance department Susan Leigh Foster introduced Green to choreographer and dancer Bill T. Jones. Jones and Arnie Zane were partners in life and were the co-artistic directors of the Bill T. Jones/Arnie Zane Dance Company. Zane was a photographer before he became a dancer and choreographer and he explored in his photographs what would become the preoccupation of his dance work as well: the human body, its gestures, postures and movement. Zane died of AIDS-related lymphoma in 1988 at the age of 39. Before his death Jones promised Zane that he would find a way to publish and exhibit Zane's photographs. Green met with Jones, reviewed Zane's photographs and was honored to undertake a book and exhibition of Zane's work.

In his introduction to the book Continuous Replay: The Photographs of Arnie Zane, titled after one of Zane's dances, Green explains the project:

This project is an attempt to make Arnie Zane's photographic work widely available for the first time, to position Arnie's work in the larger arena of late twentieth-century creative practice in the visual arts and dance, and to associate it with current issues in critical aesthetics, queer theory, and socio-political polemics, all of which focus on the body as the locus of identity. The book is a performative gesture itself, a choreography of the many elements of Arnie's life interpreted through commentary and personal recollection. The book's layout derives from the strategy of Arnie's most emblematic dancework, Continuous Replay, which is built up from the repetition and accumulation of 44 gestural positions closely related to the tight framing, symmetries, interrelationships, and crisp poses of his photographs...As such, the book's layout is a major component of its critical strategy...The layout evolved from the substance of Arnie's photographs and the boldness of the dances he danced and choreographed.

Continuous Replay and its related exhibition grew out of an extended collaboration between six people who admired Zane's dance and photography: Bill T. Jones, Bill Bissell, Phil Sykas Christine Pichini, Susan Foster, and Green. They were aided by conversations with Lois Welk, Arnie and Bill's early colleague at the American Dance Asylum, and artist Robert Longo who was often Bill and Arnie's collaborator in the 1980s. The book was co-designed by Green and Wendy Brown.

In The New York Times, dance critic Ann Daly wrote, "The show and catalogue, organized and edited by the museum's director, Jonathan Green, comprise an extraordinary recovery project that fundamentally changes the way we understand 'the other half' of the Jones-Zane collaboration. Mr. Zane was a dancer neither by nature nor formal education, but he contributed more to the company's esthetic than may have been previously apparent." This project has been made possible by the support of the Andy Warhol Foundation, the MIT Press, the Pittsburg Dance Council, the Dance Critics Association, the Three Rivers Arts Festival, Tony Culver, and UCR which provided two residencies for Bill T. Jones at the university in 1995 and 1996. Continuous Replay: The Photographs of Arnie Zane was the Winner of the American Museum Association Second Place Museum Catalog of the Year, 1999, and was listed in The New York Times as one of the best photography books of 1999.

=== One Ground: 4 Palestinian & 4 Israeli Filmmakers ===
In 2003 Green invited his graduate student Mitra Abbaspour to become the associate curator at the California Museum of Photography. Responding to their own family backgrounds (Green's parents were actively Zionist, Abbaspour's father was a devout Persian Muslim) they conceived of an interventionist exhibition that would differentiate itself from other exhibitions and endless dialogue-and-reconciliation meetings regarding the Middle East. They wished to allow instead the strength of artists' work to suggest in visceral terms tangible human solutions that seemed unavailable in the political sphere. One Ground: 4 Palestinian & 4 Israeli Filmmakers shifted focus from documentary footage that depicts the literal events of political conflict to the presentation of metaphorical works that address the more conceptual and universal issues of exile, loss, belonging, identity, and home. One Ground included work of Avi Mograbi, B.Z. Goldberg, Elia Suleiman, Emily Jacir, Michal Rovner, Mona Hatoum, Ori Gersht, and the American premiere of Rashid Masharawi's film Waiting. Critical to the conceptualization of this exhibition was a specifically designed architectural installation environment. Green chose a team of multinational architects who had personal ties to the region to design the installation. The team headed by Egyptian architect Mohamed Sharif and his Israeli partner Joel Blank were also finalists in a collaborative proposal for the Yitzak Rabin Peace Forum Memorial in Tel Aviv.

During planning for the exhibition, a unique and important email dialogue emerged among the artists, architects, and curators. The first step of the emails was to determine if and under what terms each filmmaker would even agree to be shown side-by-side with the other filmmakers in such an exhibition: as this dialogue developed it changed not only the title of the exhibition but also the way One Ground was presented. The emails that circulated among the group became the foundation for the exhibition. As a tangible artifact, the emails, enlarged at the show's entrance, were included in full as a component of the exhibition itself. The Amsterdam theoretical research collective Public Space with A Roof (PSWAR) excerpted this email dialogue in their 2005 Reader, Relocated Identities, a publication dedicated to issues of identity and migration. Here the emails were reprinted as correlative and equal to excepts from Judith Butler's Excitable Speech: A Politics of the Performative; Susan Sontag's Regarding the Pain of Others; and Vilem Flusser's The Freedom of the Migrant. In the PSWAR publication the emails can be seen as moving beyond what Judith Butler called "violent" and "excitable injurious speech," illustrating rather Butler's notion of an "unexpected and enabling response." The exhibition's architectural installation was featured in the Architectural Journal 306090 of the Princeton Architectural Press, 2003, together with extended commentary and photographic documentation. The exhibition was supported by Hitachi America Ltd. And it was selected by ArtsNet as one of the 25 significant American exhibitions of Summer 2003.

=== Pedro Meyer: Truths & Fictions / Verdades y Ficciones ===
When Green first came to California in 1990 he met the Mexican photographer Pedro Meyer who was living part of each year in Los Angeles. Meyer by 1990 had begun to create a new genre of photography that used Photoshop and other digital programs to synthesize in a single documentary photograph an apparently single moment in time, a moment which was actually highly manipulated, seamed together and derived from many images. Green was fascinated with Meyer's reinterpretation of Cartier-Bresson's Decisive Moment into Meyer's Digital Moment and offered to curate a major exhibition of Meyer's work. Green wrote:

Though digital copies of photographs had been around for the past 20 years, "photographic reality" was defined as an unmanipulated straight photograph. And "photographic reality" was an expression that defined the notion of visual truth for the past 150 years. Indeed, for well over a century, there had been an unspoken covenant between photographer and audience: an agreement to embrace the myth of photographic truth. But Meyer's digital photographs called into question this long-lived concept. His wry images challenged the essential truths and myths surrounding the documentary aesthetic. They showed that photographic images can be edited and transformed with the same ease with which sentences can be moved and altered on a word processor. Meyer's pictures highlighted the transition of the photographic medium from its photochemical origins to its new electronic foundation. Meyer's constructed photographs called to mind the biting political commentary of photomontage. Yet photomontage made its point by unexpected juxtapositions and discontinuous images. Meyer jolted our consciousness by presenting a continuous, almost believable world.

In 1993 Meyer's exhibition Truths & Fictions / Verdades y Ficciones: A Journey from Documentary to Digital Photography opened at California Museum of Photography. It then traveled through 1997 to Museum of Contemporary Photography, Chicago, Illinois; Museo de Artes Visuales Alejandro Otero, Caracas, Venezuela; Impressions Gallery, York, England; Rencontres Internationales de Photographie, Arles, France; The Mexican Museum, San Francisco, California; Center of the Image, Mexico City; Corcoran Gallery of Art, Washington, D.C.; Museum of South Texas, Corpus Christi; and Houston Center for Photography, Texas. Green provided audio commentary on the Voyager CD-ROM that accompanied the exhibition. Truths & Fictions was supported by grants from the National Endowment for the Arts and the US-Mexico fund for Culture.

In 2006 Green, provided written commentary on the occasion of the republication of Meyer's first CD-ROM, I Photograph to Remember. This earlier CD-ROM is a deeply moving narration that uses straight photographs to document "the complicity of tenderness" forged between Pedro and his parents, Liesel and Ernesto Meyer as Liesel and Ernesto face each other's death. In Green's essay, "The Art of Storytelling," he writes:

I Photograph to Remember is not a digital production but rather a digital utterance. It utilizes none of the devices we have come to associate with new media, strategies that Pedro himself uses in his other digital work: digital compositing, sampling, remixing, interactivity. And while it now plays on the ubiquitous devices that define our digital age, it always surprises us that such complex instruments can achieve such directness and simplicity. When we plug in our video iPod, we are astonished not by hyper, remixed reality but by poetic grace.

=== Trisha Ziff: Korda's Portrait of Che Guevara ===
Curator and scholar Trisha Ziff and Green had a long history of working together on exhibitions for the California Museum of Photography. So when Ziff came to Green with an idea to gather different versions of images based on Korda's photograph of Che Guevara, he said, according to Ziff, "Go for it. It's a great idea. So, we spent over a year gathering photographs, objects and posters from all over the world — including a lot of original posters from Cuba from the '60s — and slowly this collection began to materialize." The show opened in 2005 and was instantly in demand. The exhibition was shown at eleven venues in the US and abroad. As it moved from place to place the title of the exhibition changed to reflect changes in language and culture. When the show appeared at ICP in New York, The Washington Post noted, "Cherry Guevara and other examples of what could be called Che abuse are now on display in an exhibition titled ¡Che! Revolution and Commerce. It's the story of a single photograph and its fluky journey from contact sheet to international ubiquity and then into the farcical maw of commercial kitsch. Shot by a onetime fashion photographer named Alberto Korda, it might be, according to the show's curators, the most reproduced image in the history of photography."

Green, interviewed at the opening of the Che exhibition at the Victoria and Albert Museum, London, speculates "that Korda's image has worked its way into languages around the world. It has become an alpha-numeric character, a hieroglyph, an instant symbol. It mysteriously reappears wherever and whenever there's a conflict."

Included in the exhibition is a six-channel video installation by Green that examines the different portrayals of Che in six films using synchronized excerpts and coordinated sound:

Che! 1969, with Omar Sharif as Che

El Che: Investigating a Legend, 1997, with Che seen on archive footage

Fidel! 2002, with Gael Garcia Bernal as Che

The Motorcycle Diaries, 2004, with Gael Garcia Bernal as Ernesto 'Che' Guevara

Che, 1997, with Julio Quesada as Che

KordaVision: A Cuban Revelation, 2004, with footage of photographer Alberto Korda.

The exhibition was supported in part by the Anglo Mexican Foundation; Center for the Study of Political Graphics, Los Angeles; and Zonezero, Mexico City. The New York International Center for Photography's presentation was made possible with support from The Smart Family Foundation, the Mexican Cultural Institute of New York, and Mexicana Airlines.

=== Culver Center of the Arts & Keystone Mast Collection ===
The UCR California Museum of Photography is housed in a 1930 Kress Dime store, remodeled and repurposed by architect Stanley Saitowitz in 1990. Ten years later Green and the dean of UCR College of Arts and Humanities, Patricia O'Brien, initiated a historic renovation and reuse project in the adjacent 1895 Rouse Department Store, whose original architect J. Stanley Wilson was one of the architects of Riverside's historic Mission Inn. The Rouse Department Store, which had been sitting vacant for many years, contained a period façade, freestanding display cases in the glass entry arcade and a magnificent two-story, skylit atrium. Its architectural presence and extensive square footage provided the freedom to expand the photography museum and provide additional facilities for arts programming. The building also provided space to rehouse the museum's Keystone-Mast stereo plate collection. Green, working with a faculty committee, developed the program of requirements for the renovation and reuse of the building. This new facility, known as the Culver Center of the Arts, was positioned in Green's words "to provide a cultural presence, educational resource, community center, and intellectual meeting ground for the university and the community." As he had done with Peter Eisenman at the Wexner Center, Green worked closely with the architect, Annie Chu of Chu-Gooding, both during design development as well as during the actual construction of the new space. The project was awarded the City of Riverside Beautification Award, 2011, and the AIA Inland Empire Citation Award, 2011.

Green received a $500,000 grant from the federal Save America's Treasures program for rehousing and seismically isolating the world-treasure Keystone-Mast Collection of over 350,000 glass stereoscopic plates, photographs and negatives in a new archive located in the Culver Center. The Keystone Collection depicts the world between the late-nineteenth and mid-twentieth centuries. During Green's tenure at the museum, Keystone was utilized as the source of two 3-D IMAX films. And to further broaden UCR/CMP's accessibility, Green initiated a public website for CMP's programs and an internet gateway to its collections. Keystone material was also integrated into the digital Online Archive of California (OAC).

== Films 2015–2022 ==
Shortly before retiring from UCR, Green began making short, meditative films. He has now posted over 40 on Vimeo. Film marker Patryk Kizny has called Green's film "Proof," "An extraordinary project, a meditation on human existence." He asked Green to describe the main aspects of the project. Green replied,

"Proof" is a meditation on human and natural continuity: change, aging, death, and regeneration. It is an intimate portrait for me as I concentrate on myself and my own sons and granddaughters, but I hope it has more universal resonance. The germ of the film began in a series of short 3-minute videos of dense material from nature. I was fascinated by the complexity and density of thickets, brush, bramble, and briars. I eventually placed myself in front of the camera rather than just shooting out into the natural world and suddenly understood one potential linkage. By presenting my family and the thickets, one-by-one without altering tone or expression I hoped they would be perceived as indisputable occurrences, as events, as facts: a Proof.

== Photographs in public collections ==
- Center for Creative Photography, Tucson
- Cleveland Museum of Art
- Massachusetts Institute of Technology
- Minneapolis Institute of Arts
- Moderna Museet, Stockholm
- Museum of Fine Art, Houston
- Museum of Fine Arts, Boston
- Princeton University Art Museum
- Seattle Art Museum

== Publications, audio narratives, photographs and films ==
1973 Jonathan Green, Camera Work: A Critical Anthology, Aperture, Millerton, N.Y.1973. Plates 102, pp. 376. With Biographies, Bibliography, Indices. Art Librarians Society of North America Publishing Award: Best Art Book of 1973. ISBN 0912334738

1974 Jonathan Green, The Snapshot, Edited with an Introduction, Aperture, Millerton NY, also Aperture, Vol 19, Number 1. 1974. 128 pp. Additional essays by Lisette Model, Tod Papageorge, Steven Halpern, Walker Evans, John A. Kouwenhoven, Judith Wechsler, Paul Strand. Portfolios by Bill Zulpo-Dane, Emmet Gowin, Garry Winogrand, Gus Kayafas, Henry Wessel, Jr, Joel Meyerowitz, Lee Friedlander, Nancy Rexroth, Richard Albertine, Robert Frank, Tod Papageorge, and Wendy Snyder MacNeil. Chosen by the New York Type Directors Club for Awards Exhibition at the American Institute of Graphic Arts. ISBN 0912334576

1974 Celebrations: An Exhibition of Original Photographs, Selection and texts by Minor White and Jonathan Green, preface by Gyorgy Kepes, Hayden Gallery, Massachusetts Institute of Technology, Cambridge. An Aperture Book, New York, 1974. p. 96. ISBN 0912334576

1979 Renato Danese, Editor, American Images: New Work by Twenty Contemporary Photographers, McGraw-Hill, New York, 1979. ISBN 0070152950. Robert Adams, Lewis Baltz, Harry Callahan, William Clift, Linda Connor, Bevan Davies, Roy DeCarava, William Eggleston, Elliott Erwin, Larry Fink, Frank Gohlke, John Gossage, Jonathan Green, Jan Groover, Mary Ellen Mark, Joel Meyerowitz, Richard Misrach, Nicholas Nixon, Tod Papageorge, Stephen Shore. Includes a statement by each photographer.

1979 "Introduction to Camera Work" in The Camera Viewed/Writings on Twentieth-Century Photography, Volume 1: Photography Before World War II, Edited by Peninah Petruck, E.P. Dutton, 1979. Reprinted from Camera Work: A Critical Anthology. ISBN 0525475354

1981 Jonathan Green, "Minor White at MIT," Positive, Creative Photography Laboratory, MIT.

1983 Jonathan Green, "James Friedman: Rephotographing the History of The World," in James Friedman: Color Photographs 1979–1982, The Ohio State University Gallery of Fine Art.

1984 Jonathan Green, "Housing a Program: Architecture as Logic, Architecture as Symbol," in A Center for the Visual Arts: The Ohio State University Competition, Edited by Peter Arnell and Ted Bickford, Rizzoli, 1984. ISBN 084780528X. With additional essays by Kurt Forster, Alan Colquhoun, Richard Miller, Edward W. Wolner, and Patricia J. Wuichet.

1984 Jonathan Green, American Photography: A Critical History 1945–1980. Harry N. Abrams, 1984. Pictures selected and sequenced by Jonathan Green and James Friedman. 332 illustrations, 242 pages. Nikon Book of the Year, 1984. Recipient of the Benjamin Citation, 1986, from the American Photographic Historical Society in recognition of achievement in photographic history. ISBN 978-0810918146

1985 Jonathan Green, "Straight Shooting in America" in 1985 Photography Annual, Ziff-Davis Publishing, New York. Reprint of Chapter 7, American Photography: A Critical History 1945–1980.

1985 Jonathan Green, "American Photography in the 1950s: 'Anybody Doesn't Like These Pitchers Don't Like Potry, See?'" in American Images: Photography 1945–1980, Barbican Art Gallery, Penguin Books, Middlesex, England, 1985. Edited by Peter Turner. Text amalgamated from Chapters 4 and 5 from American Photography: A Critical History 1945–1980. ISBN 978-0140079883

1987 Jonathan Green, Edited with an Introduction. Rudolf Baranik, Elegies: Sleep Napalm Night Sky. The Ohio State University Gallery of Fine Art and St. Martin's Press, New York, 1987. With an essay by Donald Kuspit and a memoir by the artist.

1987 Pink Noise: Three Conversations Concerning an Acoustic Installation: Philip Glass, Richard Serra, Kurt Munacsi. Jonathan Green, editor. The Ohio State University Gallery of Fine Art, 1987. Designed by Jonathan Green and Wendy Brown. A Wexner Center for the Arts Preview Event.

1989 Jonathan Green, "Algorithms for Discovery," in Wexner Center for the Visual Arts, The Ohio State University, Rizzoli, 1989. With critical essays by Rafael Moneo and Anthony Vidler. And essays by Robert Stearns, Director of the Wexner Center for the Visual Arts and Jonathan Green, Founding Project Director, Wexner Center for the Visual Arts. Includes a portfolio of photographs of the construction of the Wexner Center by James Friedman. ISBN 0847811158

1989 Jonathan Green, "The Photo Constructions of Jean Ruiter," in Jean Ruiter: PhotoWorks, Haarlem, The Netherlands. Another version published in Jean Ruiter Archive, Amsterdam.

1991 Jonathan Green, "California Photography," Voice over narration for New California Photography, Amsterdam Cultural Television, Amsterdam, Holland, 1991.

1991 Jonathan Green, "Instinct, Reason, and Experience: Evidence of Reality," Photoworks by Ten American Artists. Introduction to exhibition catalog. Leusden, Netherlands: Uitgeverij Foto 1991.

1991 Jonathan Green, "5 Celebrations of Leslie J. Payne," in Leslie Payne: Visions of Flight. Exhibition catalog. Wexner Center for the Arts, January 1991.

1991 Jonathan Green, "Leslie Payne: Visions of Flight - A Reconstruction," Folk Art Messenger, vol. 4, no. 3, Spring 1991.

1993 Jonathan Green, "Las verdades y ficciones en la obra de Pedro Meyer," El National, Mexico City, November 22, 1993. Edited version of CD-ROM essay.

1993 Jonathan Green, "Verdades y Ficciones, Un viaje a la fotografía digital," in Verdades y Ficciones, Museo de Artes Visualles Alejandro Otero, Caracas, 1993. Edited version of CD-ROM essay.

1993 Three Texts on the Work of Rudolf Baranik, Donald Kuspit, Rudolf Baranik, Lucy Lippard, Jonathan Green, William Olander. Published by Bee Sting Press, 1993.

1994 Jonathan Green, "Extraphotographic Reality," End Paper Section, The Chronicle of Higher Education, October 12, 1994.

1995 Jonathan Green, "So Bland a Notion of Beauty as Perfection," in The Garden of Earthly Delights: Photographs by Edward Weston and Robert Mapplethorpe. Edited with an essay by Jonathan Green. UCR/California Museum of Photography,1995. Curated by Mark Johnstone and Jonathan Green. Additional essays by Irene Borger, Mark Johnstone, Shelley Rice and Mike Weaver. Designed by Jonathan Green and Wendy Brown. Chosen by Art in America: Books for Collector's Library.

1995 Pedro Meyer, Truths & Fictions: A Journey from Documentary to Digital Photography. (Pedro Meyer: Verdades y Ficciones: Un Viaje de la Fotografia Documental a la Digital), CD-ROM. Audio essay by Jonathan Green. Disk in English and Spanish. Voyager, New York 1995.

1998 Jonathan Green, "The LA Project, Sightings of the Marvelous and Extraordinary," in Douglas McCulloh, Chance Encounters: The L.A. Project, Riverside, California: University of California/California Museum of Photography ISBN 978-0966693607

1998 Jonathan Green, "Aperture in the Fifties: The Word and the Way," in Photography 1900 to the Present, An anthology of critical writings by Diana Emery Hulick with Joseph Marshall. Excerpts from Chapter 4, American Photography: A Critical History 1945–1980. Prentice-Hall, 1998. ISBN 0132540959

1999 Jonathan Green, Continuous Replay: The Photographs of Arnie Zane, MIT Press, Cambridge, 1999. With an introduction by Bill T. Jones and essays and commentary by Jonathan Green, Susan Leigh Foster, Christine Pichini, Bill Bissell, Robert Longo, Philip Sykas, and Lois Welk. Pages 204. Designed by Jonathan Green and Wendy Brown. American Museum Association: Second Place Museum Catalog of the Year, 1999. ISBN 978-0262571272

2001 Jonathan Green, "Adam[s] Meet[s] MTV," in Adam Baer: Displaced Perspectives, UCR/California Museum of Photography, 2001. With additional essays by Anthony Bannon, Annika Marie, Bill Arnig, and with an Artist's Statement.

2003 Jonathan Green, "One Ground: Four Palestinian and Four Israeli Filmmakers" in Buildings, Movies and Brains, ArtBrain, Journal of Neuroaesthetics, 2003–2004

2004 Jonathan Green, "Beyond the Importance of Objects," in Jerry Burchfield, Primal Images: 100 Lumen Prints of Amazonia Flora. Center for American Places, Santa Fe and Laguna Wilderness Press, 2004. Distributed by the University of Chicago Press 2004. Foreword by Wade Davis, Introduction by Jonathan Green, Concluding essay by Jerry Burchfield. ISBN 978-1930066229

2006, Jonathan Green, "The Art of Storytelling: Pedro Meyer's I Photograph to Remember."

2006 Jonathan Green, "Pop Art & Che," in Che Guevara: Revolutionary & Icon, Edited by Trisha Ziff, Abrams Image, New York, ISBN 0810957183 Similar: Che Guevara: Revolutionary & Icon, Victoria and Albert Publications, London, 2006 ISBN 1851774955. Similar: Che Guevara: Rivoluzionario e Icona, La Triennale de Milano, 2007 ISBN 978-8837055684

2008 Jonathan Green, "The Frame as Destiny: 'The Four Sides of a Frame Are Among the Most Important Parts of a Picture,' Henry Matisse," in Leica & Hasselblad, Selections from the David Whitmire Hearst Jr. Foundation Collection, UCR/California Museum of Photography, 2008. Leica & Hasselblad includes an additional essay by Colin Westerbeck.

2009 Jonathan Green, "Michael Elderman's Speculative Theater of Light and Color," in Riverside's Fox Theater: An intimate Portrait, Photographs by Michael J. Elderman, 2009 ISBN 978-0615326801

2009 Jonathan Green, "The End of Film," in The End of Film: A Brief History of Digital Cameras, 1987–2009, Selections from the David Whitmire Hearst Jr. Foundation Collection, UCR ARTSblock, University of California Riverside, October 24, 2009 — January 30, 2010.

2021 Jonathan Green, The Idea of a Plane: Leslie J. Payne's Vision of Flight. 30 minute film written, edited, voiced, and produced by Jonathan Green. Vimeo.com/644670308.

== Awards and fellowships ==
- 1973 Camera Work: A Critical Anthology, Art Librarians Society of North America: Best Art Book of 1973
- 1974 The Snapshot, New York Type Directors Club: Design Award
- 1978 NEA Photography Fellowship
- 1979 Bell System (AT&T) Photography Fellowship
- 1984 American Photography: A Critical History 1945–1980, American Photographic Historical Society: Benjamin Citation, 1986. In recognition of achievement in photographic history
- 1984 American Photography: A Critical History 1945–1980, Nikon Book of the Year, 1984
- 1995 The Garden of Earthly Delights: Photographs by Edward Weston and Robert Mapplethorpe. Art in America: Books for Collector's Library
- 1999 Continuous Replay: The Photographs of Arnie Zane, American Museum Association: Second Place Museum Catalog of the Year, 1999
- 1999 Continuous Replay: The Photographs of Arnie Zane, New York Times: One of the Best Photography Books of the Year
- 2000–2003 Art & Science Fellow, California Science Center, Los Angeles
- 2003 One Ground: 4 Palestinian & 4 Israeli Filmmakers, ArtsNet: One of the 25 significant American exhibitions of Summer 2003
