= Nancy Rexroth =

American photographer

- Born: 1946 (age 79–80); Washington D.C.
- Education: American University, Ohio University
- Known for: Photography
- Notable work: Iowa
- Website: www.nancyrexroth.com

Nancy Rexroth (born 1946) is an American photographer noted for her pioneer work utilizing the Diana camera. In 1977, she published Iowa – the first printed monograph of work completed with a plastic camera.

== Life and work ==
Rexroth was born in Washington D.C. While completing her BFA in English at American University, she developed an interest in photojournalism and was influenced by the work of Emmet Gowin, Robert Frank, Garry Winogrand, and Henri Cartier-Bresson. She then went on to receive her MFA in Photography at Ohio University (1969-1971).

In 1969, during her graduate studies, Ohio University professor, Arnold Gassan, introduced Rexroth to the Diana camera. This toy camera used 120 (medium format) film and was known for the soft focus and impressionistic, ‘dreamlike’ images it produced as a result of its plastic lens. Although some photographers saw the effects of the Diana camera as hindrances, Rexroth embraced and explored its defects.

After completing her MFA, Rexroth moved back to the Washington, D.C. area. While there she participated in a summer internship at the Smithsonian Institution, researching the platinotype process. As a result of this internship came what would be Rexroth's second publication, The Platinotype 1977 (1976), a pamphlet on modern platinum printing.

In 1973, she moved back to Ohio to teach at Antioch College and Wright State University, and to work on a photographic series that became her first published book, Iowa, funded by a National Endowment for the Arts Grant.

=== Iowa ===
Rexroth's most notable work, Iowa, is a series of dream-like and poetic images. Each seemingly candid and liquid composition includes a soft focus and vignette, characteristic qualities of Diana camera images. In The Snapshot, author Jonathan Green writes, “The Diana images are often like something you might faintly see in the background of a photograph. Strange fuzzy leaves, masses and forms, simplified doorways. Sometimes I feel as though I could step over the edge of the frame and walk backwards into this unknown region. Then I would keep right on walking.” Speaking to the appearance of Rexroth’s work, Mary Abbe of the Minneapolis Tribune Paper states, "The show's most striking image, "A Woman's Bed" Logan, Ohio 1970, is also one of its simplest. "A Woman's Bed" is a shadowy picture of a dark headboard half-buried by a drift of stark, white, primordially pure bedding. The headboard's design and the way the bed edges into a corner suggests the narrow confines of the lives it sheltered […] a mysterious womb of light wrapped in darkness."

The Iowa series subconsciously expresses Rexroth's childhood memories of visiting family in Iowa. Growing up in the suburbs of Arlington, Virginia, she was captivated by the exotic summer landscapes of Iowa. Although the influence of her memories is present, Rexroth refers to Iowa as a hallucinatory state of mind rather than a concrete geographic location of personal sentiment. She describes Iowa as "conceived of as a kind of psychic journey from one emotional mood to the next-- a maturation process. It all happens in a place which is very exotic." In the introduction to the book, Mark L Power describes this work as "Sunny Iowa was transformed by memory into a dark Iowa with 'a real feeling of melancholy.' It became Iowa of 'atmospheres' and the Diana became a key-- with it, Rexroth unlocks Iowa from wherever she happens to be."

Iowa will be republished by the University of Texas Press in 2017 with the original introduction written by Mark L Power as well as new introductions written by Alec Soth and Anne Wilkes Tucker.

== Publications ==
- Aperture. Vol. 19, No. 1 [73], the Snapshot (1974), pp. 54–63 (contributor).
- Iowa. Rochester, NY: Violet Press, 1976. With an introduction by Mark L Power.
- The Platinotype 1977. Rochester, NY: Violet Press, 1976.

== Solo exhibitions ==
- 1972: Putnam Street Gallery, Athens, OH
- 1973: Corcoran Gallery of Art, Washington, D.C.
- 1974: Jefferson Place Gallery, Washington, D.C.
- 1975: Antioch College, Noyes Gallery, Yellow Springs, OH
- 1977: Halstead 381 Gallery, Birmingham, MI
- 1977: Light Gallery, New York, NY
- 1978: Silver Image Gallery, Columbus, OH
- 1978: Grapestake Gallery, San Francisco, CA
- 1979: Kathleen Ewing Gallery, Washington, D.C.
- 1979: Catskill Center for Photography, Woodstock, NY
- 1979: Northern Kentucky University, Highland Heights, KY
- 1980: Light Gallery, New York, NY
- 1981: Camerawork, San Francisco, CA
- 1982: Center for Creative Photography, Tucson, AZ. Polaroid SX-70 transfers.
- 1984: National Museum of American Art, Washington, D.C.
- 1999: Blue Sky Gallery, Portland, OR
- 2000–2013: Iowa, Weinstein Gallery Minneapolis, MN, 2000; Stephen Wirtz Gallery, San Francisco, CA, 2000; Roland Dille Center for the Arts, Minnesota State University, Moorhead, MN, 2003; Joseph Bellows Gallery, La Jolla, CA, 2003; Columbus Museum of Art, Columbus, OH, 2004; Robert Mann Gallery, New York, NY, 2004; Weinstein Gallery, Minneapolis, MN, 2007; Lawrence Markey Gallery, San Antonio, TX, 2013;

== Collections ==
Rexroth's work is held in the following permanent public collections:

- Center for Creative Photography, University of Arizona, Tucson, AZ
- Museum of Modern Art, New York City, NY
- Cincinnati Art Museum, Cincinnati, OH
