= Toy camera =

Simple, inexpensive film camera

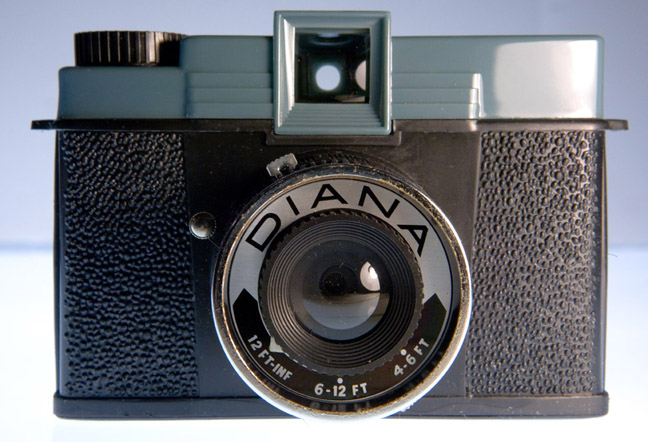
The original Diana camera was made in Hong Kong in the 1960s and 1970s. The Diana+ and Diana F+ copies are currently produced by Lomography.

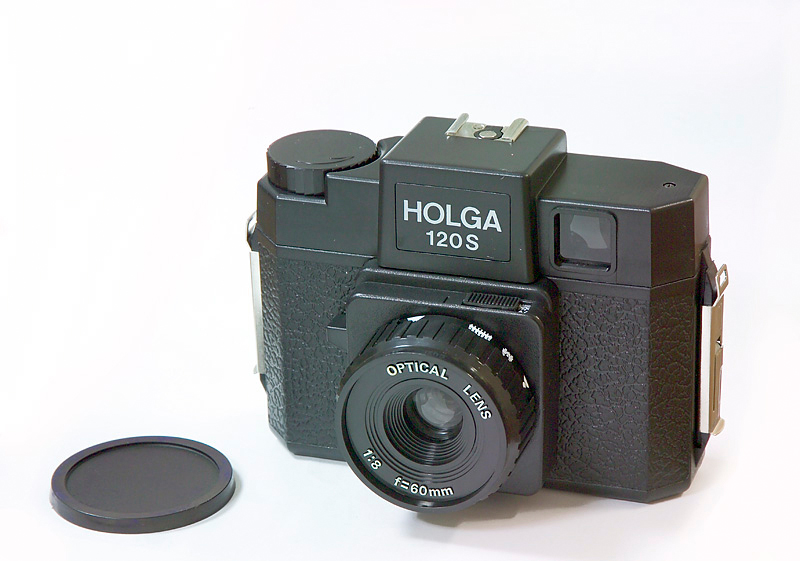
Hong Kong's Holga camera takes medium format photographs on 120 film.

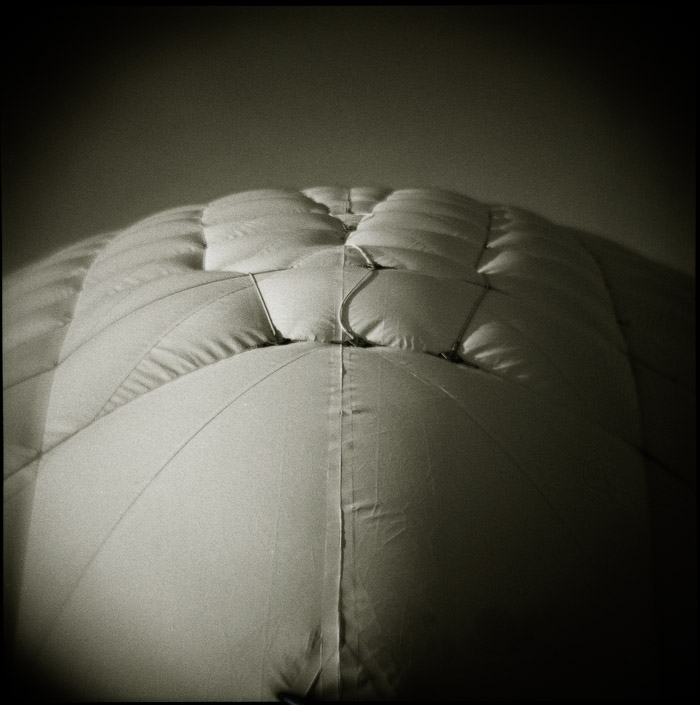
A photograph taken with a Holga

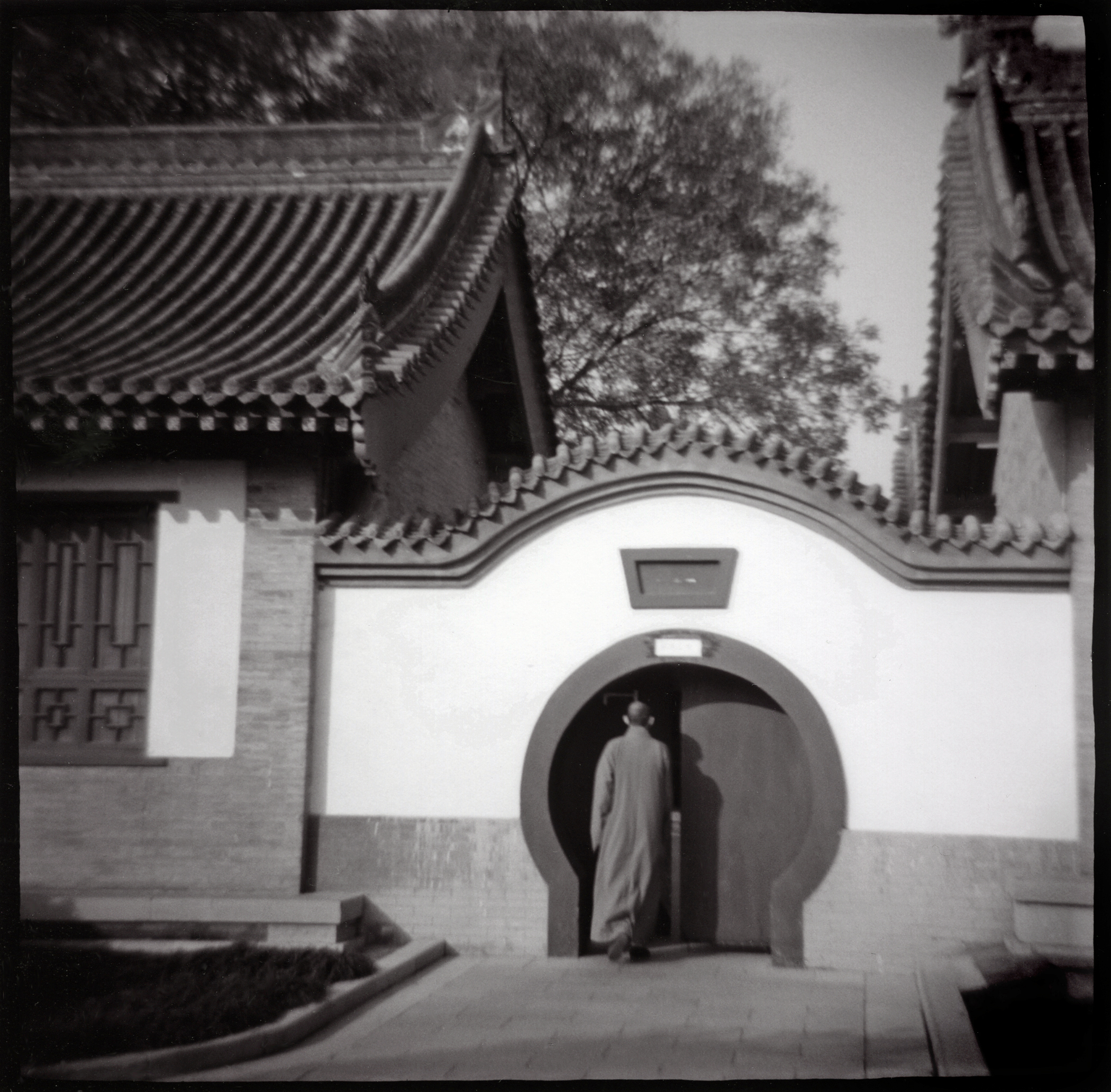
A photograph (Da Ci'en Temple, Xi'an, China) taken with an original Diana camera. Evident is the typical vignetting and blurring inherent in a Diana image.

A toy camera is a simple, inexpensive film camera. Despite the name, toy cameras are fully functional and capable of taking photographs, though with optical aberrations due to the limitations of their simple lenses. From the 1960s onward, there has been interest in the artistic use of such cameras or recreation of this style, both with cameras originally designed for children, and others originally intended as mass-market consumer cameras.

Many professional photographers have used toy cameras and exploited the vignetting, blur, light leaks, and other distortions of their inexpensive lenses for artistic effect to take award-winning pictures. Toy camera photography has been widely exhibited at many popular art shows, such as the annual "Krappy Kamera" show at the Soho Photo Gallery in the Tribeca neighborhood of New York City. Various publications such as Popular Photography magazine have extolled the virtues of the Diana camera in its own right as an "art" producing image maker. Several books have also featured the work of toy cameras such as The Friends of Photography's The Diana Show, Iowa by Nancy Rexroth, and Angels at the Arno by Eric Lindbloom.

== See also ==
- Lomography, an experimental genre of photography often employing toy cameras
- Pinhole camera
- Holga, Chinese mass-market 120 film camera
- Lubitel, mass-market Russian, 120 film, twin-lens reflex cameras
- Lensbaby
- PXL2000, a toy video camera that has been rediscovered by filmmakers
