= Holga =

120 film camera

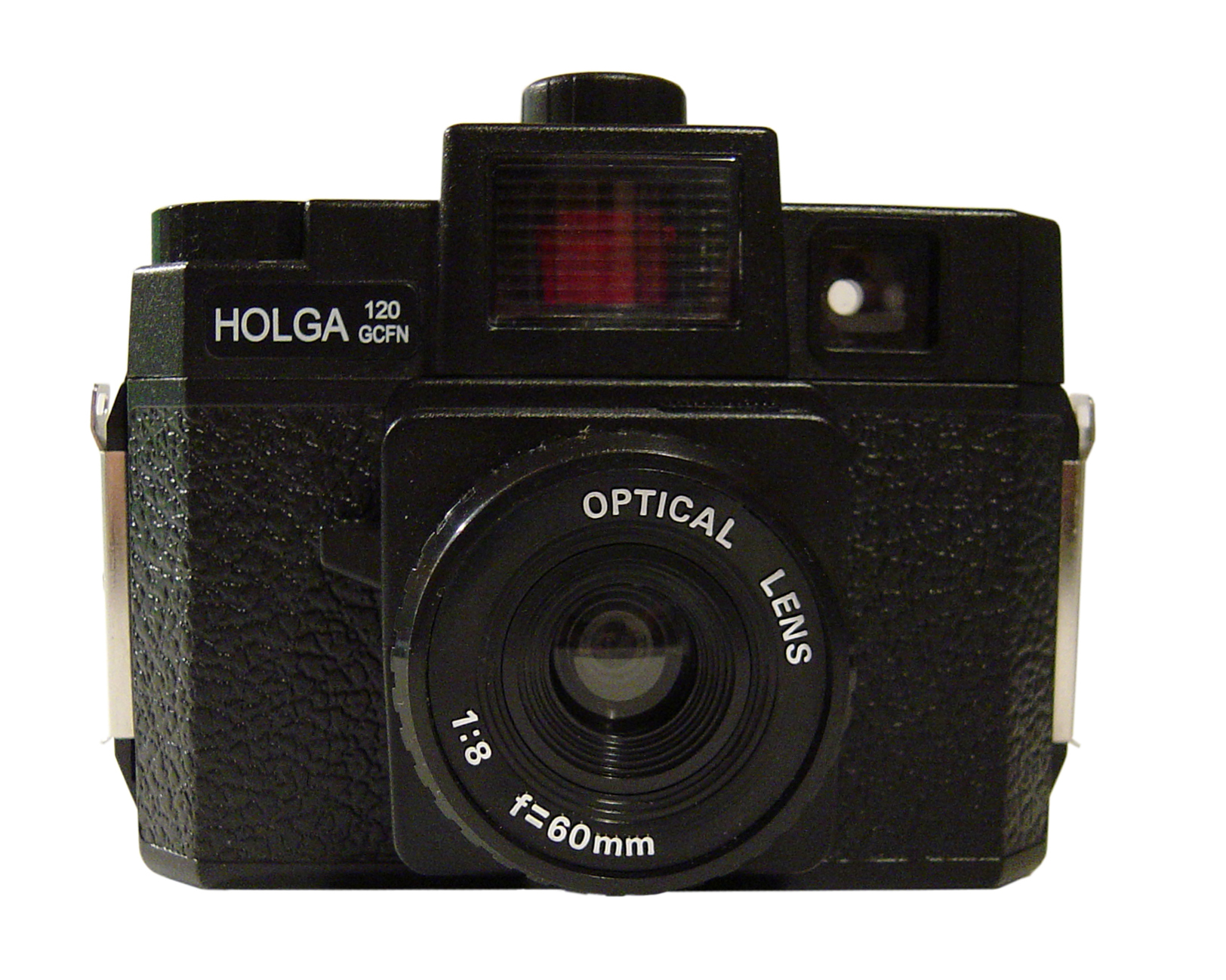

Overview
- Maker: Various
- Type: Box camera
- Released: 1982

Lens
- Lens: 60 mm plastic meniscus
- F-numbers: f/8.0, f/11.0 (actual f/13)

Sensor/medium
- Film format: 120
- Film size: 56 mm × 56 mm (6x4.5 cm or 6x6 cm film format)
- Recording medium: 120 film

Focusing
- Focus: Manual zone (four settings)

Shutter
- Shutter speeds: 1/100 or 1/125, Bulb
- Made in: People's Republic of China

The Holga is a medium format 120 film camera, made in Hong Kong, known for its low-fidelity aesthetic.

The Holga's low-cost construction and simple meniscus lens often yields pictures that display vignetting, blur, light leaks and other distortions. The camera's limitations have brought it a cult following among some photographers, and Holga photos have won awards and competitions in art and news photography. As of July 2017, the camera was in production after being unavailable for two years.

== History ==
The Holga camera was designed by Lee Ting-mo in 1982. It first appeared in 1982 in British Hong Kong. At the time, 120 roll film in black-and-white was the most widely available film in neighbouring China. The Holga was intended to provide an inexpensive mass-market camera for the Chinese working class in order to record family portraits and events. However, the rapid adoption of the 35mm film format, due to new foreign camera and film imports, virtually eliminated the consumer market for 120 roll film in China. Seeking new markets, the manufacturer sought to distribute the Holga outside mainland China.

Within a few years after the Holga's introduction to foreign markets, some photographers began using the Holga for its surrealistic, impressionistic renderings of landscape, still life, portrait and especially street photography. These owners prized the Holga for its lack of precision, light leaks and inexpensive qualities, which enabled the photographer to concentrate on innovation and creative vision in place of increasingly expensive camera technology. In this respect, the Holga became the successor to the Diana and other toy cameras previously used in such work. A Holga photograph by photojournalist David Burnett of former vice-president Al Gore during a 2000 campaign appearance earned a top prize in a 2001 White House News Photographers' Association Eyes of History award ceremony.

Recently, the Holga has experienced renewed consumer interest outside China due to the increasing popularity of toy cameras and a continuing counterculture response to the increasing complexity of modern cameras.

In late November 2015, Freestyle Photographic Supplies COO Gerald H. Karmele confirmed that Tokina had shut down the factory that produced Holga cameras and related accessories, ending the production of these toy cameras. A revitalized, but saturated, toy camera market led to waning sales. However, as of July 2017, Freestyle reported that the moulds had been tracked down, put back into production, and the Holgas were to be available once again.

== Models ==
=== 120 film ===
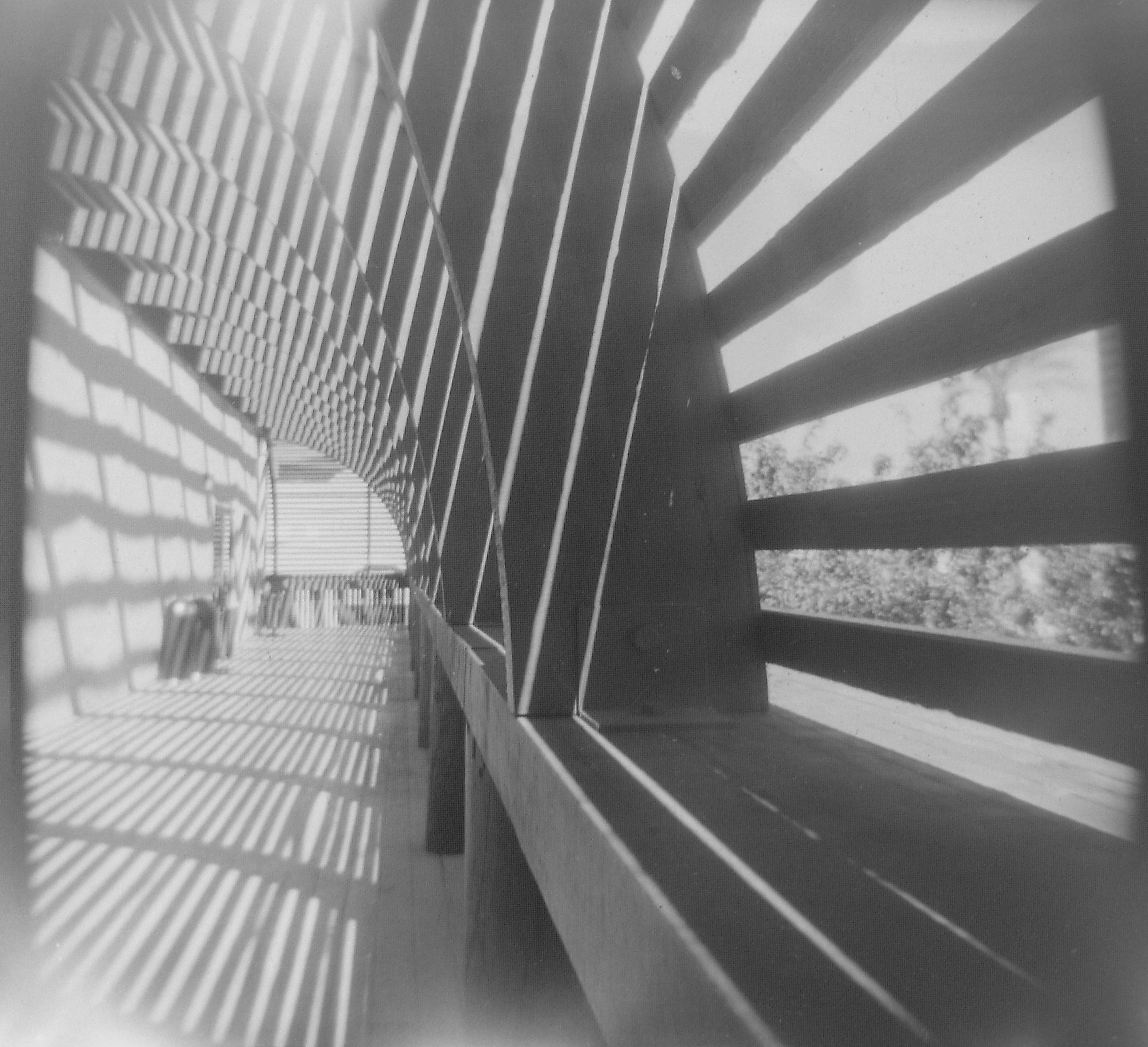
A developed image from a Holga 120N with black and white film

- Holga 120S – The original Holga, since discontinued. Fixed shutter speed at 1/100s, adjustable focus from 3 feet to infinity, plastic 60 mm f/8 meniscus lens, two-position f-stop switch which stops the lens to f/11, hot shoe, and 6x4.5 cm film mask.
- WOCA – A Holga 120S with a Japanese-supplied glass meniscus lens, since discontinued and replaced by the Holga 120GN, which recalled the lens nomenclature for meniscus.
- Holga 120N – Updated version with plastic 60 mm f/8 lens, tripod mount, bulb exposure mode, improved film counter window switch, foam inserts to provide film spool tensioning, and an additional 6x6 cm film mask
- Holga 120SF – A standard Holga 120S, with built-in flash
- Holga 120FN – A Holga 120N with built-in flash
- Holga 120CFN – A Holga 120FN with built-in color flash
- Holga 120GN – A Holga 120N with glass lens
- Holga 120GFN – A Holga 120FN with glass lens and built-in flash
- Holga 120GCFN – A Holga 120FN with color flash and glass lens
- Holga 120TLR – A Holga 120CFN with a twin-lens reflex (TLR) viewfinder in lieu of the standard viewfinder, with a relocated color flash
- Holga 120GTLR – A Holga 120TLR with glass lens
- Holga 120PC – A pinhole version of the 120N using 6x4.5 cm or 6x6 cm format
- Holga 120WPC – A wide pinhole version of the 120N using 6x9 or 6x12 cm format
- Holga 120-3D Stereo Camera – Two lenses in a wide body
- Holga 120 3D Stereo Pinhole Camera – Two pinhole lenses in a wide body
- Holga 120 Pan Panoramic Camera – This is a wide angle panoramic camera. It is possible to capture scenes spanning from left to right. The lens has a 67 degree angle of view, equivalent to about 28mm on 35mm format.

=== 110 film ===
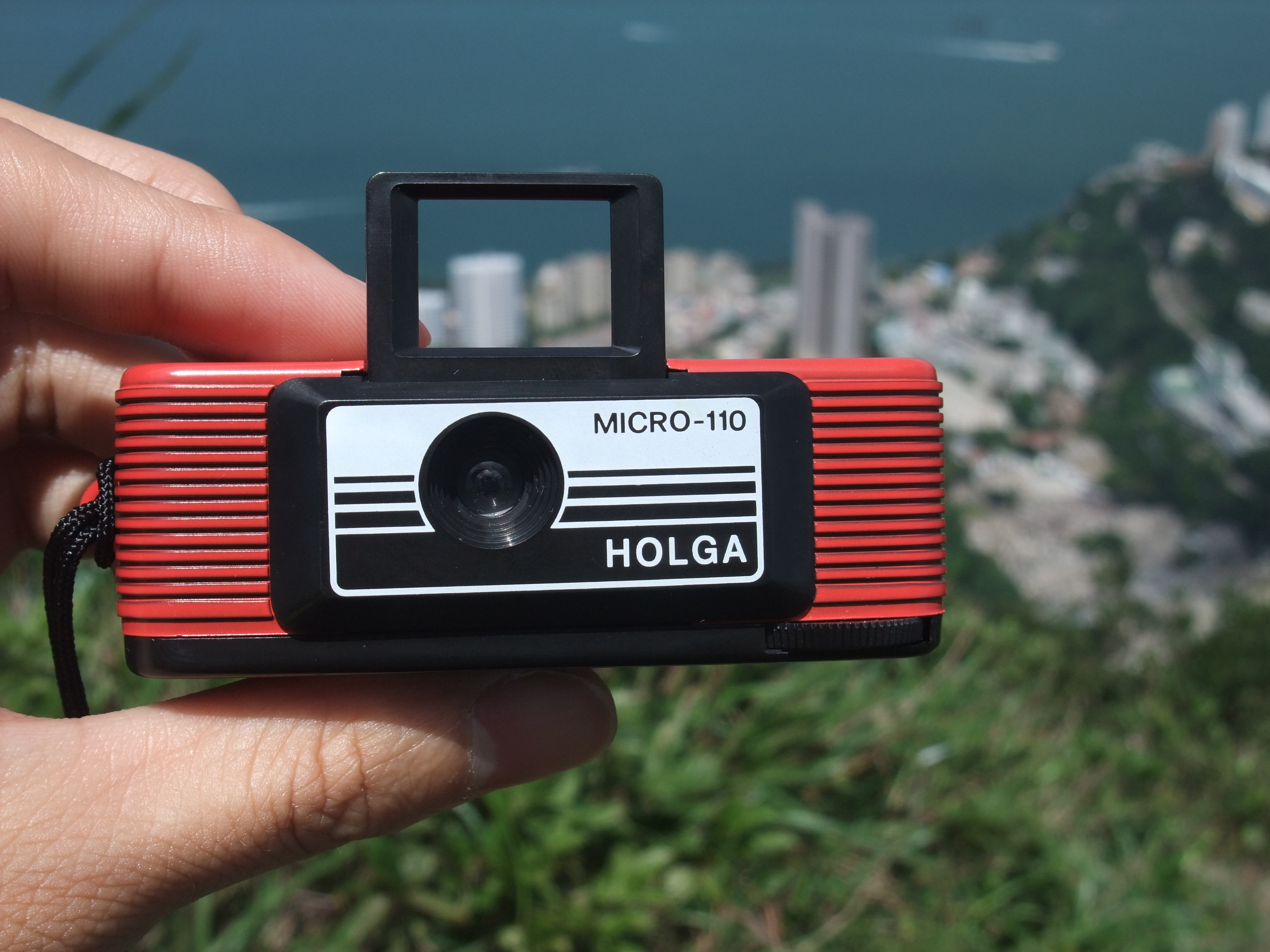
Holga Micro-110

- Holga Micro 110 – Standard 26 mm 110 holga
- Holga 110 TFS – A 110 camera with a switchable standard, and telephoto format

=== 135 film (35mm) ===
- Holga 135 – A Holga with 35 mm film
- Holga 135BC – A Holga already made for 35 mm film, plastic lens and the same lens mount of the Holgas 120 but with 47 mm lens, f1:8 or 1:11 and shutter speed 1/100. "BC" means "Black Corners"; the 135BC model has a built in transparent mask which creates a vignetting effect
- Holga 135PC – The pinhole version of the Holga 135 BC
- Holga 135AFX – 38 mm f/3.8 lens with infrared autofocus, automatic film load, built-in pop-up flash and interlock shutter release
- WOCA NF-4 - 38mm f/8 Glass Lens from Japan. Shares a body with the Holga 135 but has a different style lens.
- Holga K202 – Meow Kitty camera in the shape of a cat face with blinking lights and cat sound.
- Holga K200N – A 35 mm film point-and-shoot Holga with colour flash and a dismountable fisheye.
- Holga K200NM – The K200N plus a fisheye viewer and a multiple exposure button.
- Holga 135TIM – A half-frame 35 mm Holga.
- Holga 135TLR – A Holga 35 mm twin lens reflex.
- Holga 135PAN – A Holga 35 mm Panoramic camera.

=== Digital Holga lenses ===
- Holga HL-C – A 60 mm f/8 Holga lens with Canon EF-mount.
- Holga HL-N – A 60 mm f/8 Holga lens with Nikon F-mount.
- Holga HL-O – A 60 mm f/8 Holga lens with Four-Thirds mount, for Olympus DSLR cameras.
- Holga HL-P – A 60 mm f/8 Holga lens for Pentax DSLR cameras with K-mount.
- Holga HL-S – A 60 mm f/8 Holga lens for Konica Minolta/Sony DSLR cameras with A-mount.
- Holga HL(W)-OP – A 25 mm f/8 Holga lens with Micro Four-Thirds mount, with lettering for Olympus PEN cameras.
- Holga HL(W)-PLG – A 25 mm f/8 Holga lens with Micro Four-Thirds mount, with lettering for Panasonic Lumix G cameras.
- Holga HL(W)-SN – A 25 mm f/8 Holga lens with Sony E-mount.
- Holga HL(W)-SSN – A 29 mm f/8 Holga lens with Samsung NX-mount.

== Lens and aperture settings ==
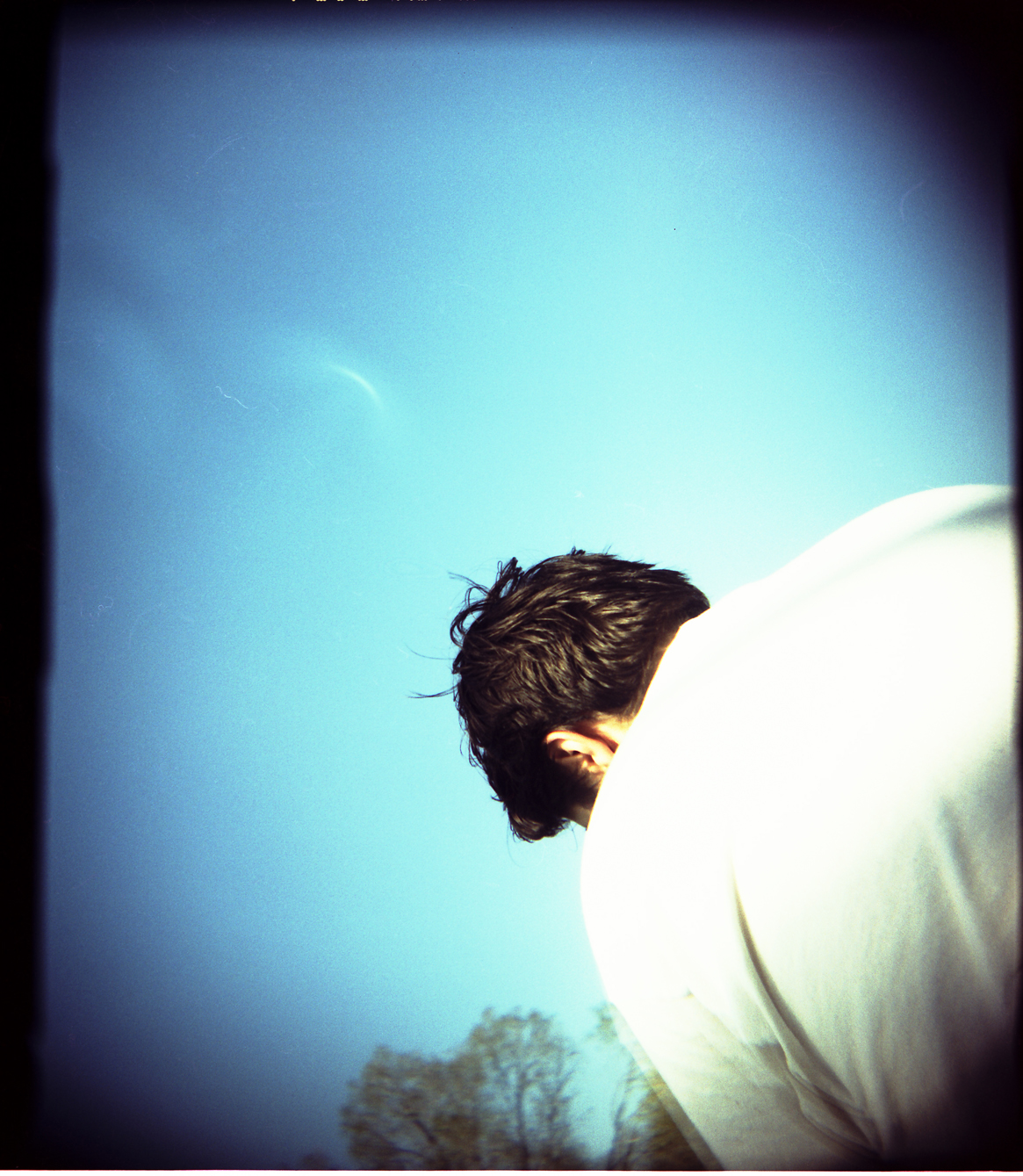
A sample Holga image showing its characteristic vignetting

Most Holga cameras use a single-piece plastic meniscus lens with a focal length of 60 millimeters and utilize a zone-focus system that can adjust from about 1 meter (3 feet) to infinity. Like any simple meniscus lens, the Holga lens exhibits soft focus and chromatic aberration. Other Holga variants, denoted either by the letter 'G' in their model name, or the name WOCA, feature a simple glass lens, but are otherwise identical in construction. The manufacturer has since outsourced supply of the varying plastic and glass lenses to contractors in Japan and China

There is an aperture setting switch on the camera with two positions indicated by pictorial ideograms: sunny and cloudy, with a nominal value of f/11 and f/8, respectively. Due to a manufacturing oversight, this switch has no effect on pre-2009 production cameras, and the actual aperture is around f/13, giving the Holga just one aperture. The problem is reported as having been fixed in cameras post-2009, providing two working aperture settings of f/13 and f/20, and earlier cameras are modifiable to provide two usable settings. Apertures of f/10 and f/13 work well for ISO200 speed films, while settings of f/13 and f/19 tend to suit faster films of around ISO400.

== Film format ==
The Holga was originally designed to accept either a 6×4.5 format or a 6×6 (square) format. However, once the camera went into production, vignetting (darkening of the corners of the finished photograph) occurred when the camera was modified to a 6×6 format. Hence, early Holgas had their film size switches tightly fixed to shoot only 6×4.5 format. Many owners removed both this restriction and the 6×4.5 film mask as well, finding the resultant vignetting a desirable effect. Later Holgas such as the 120N come with two masks for both the 6×4.5 and 6×6 format. Holgas can even be modified to use 35 mm film.

The Holga has one shutter speed – approximately 1/100 of a second. The camera can shoot 16 exposures per 120 roll in 6x4.5 cm format or 12 exposures in 6x6 format. Film is advanced by a knob on the top of the camera, and frame numbers printed on the backing paper of the film can be viewed through a red window on the back of the Holga. The number of frames chosen is indicated by the black arrow.

== Modifications and variants ==
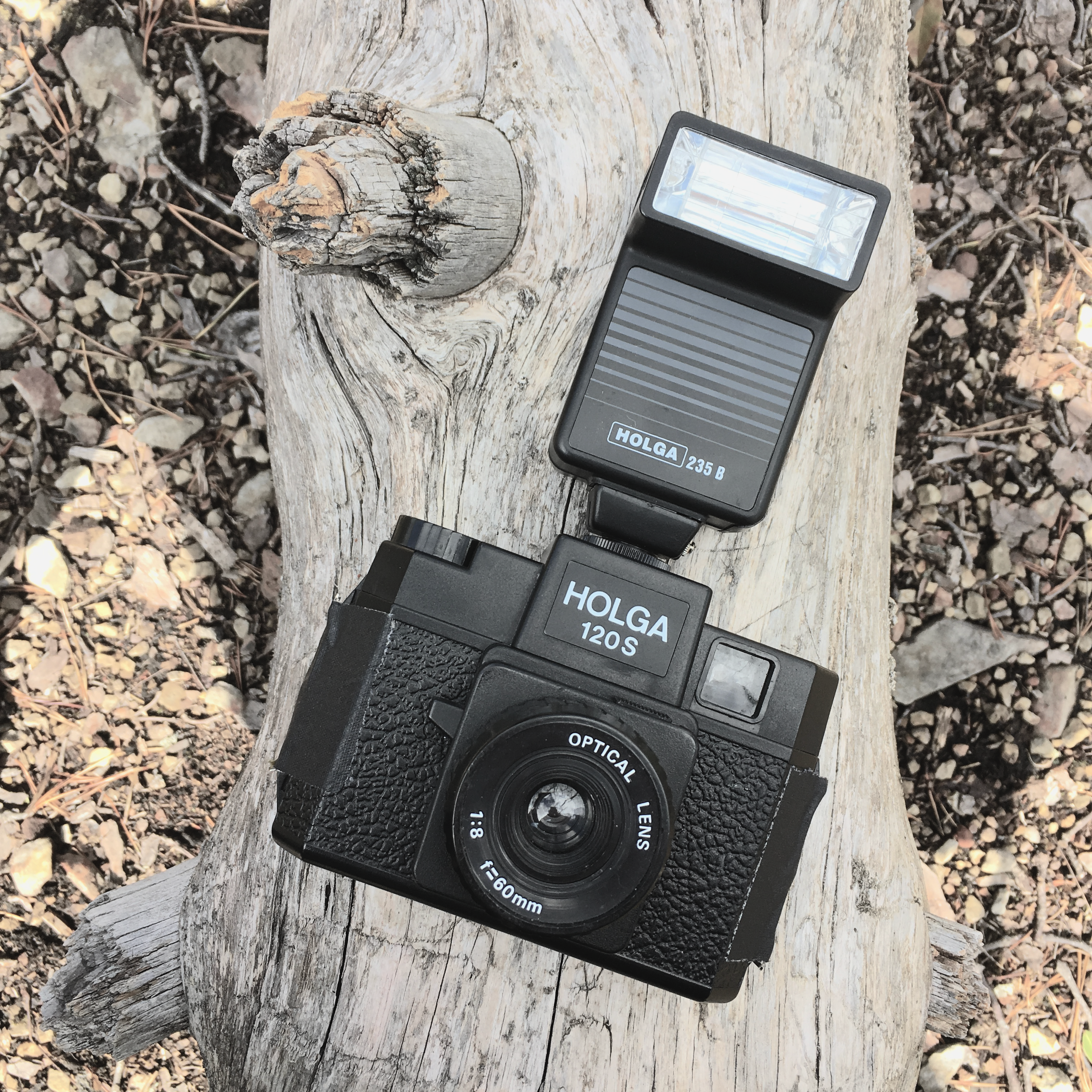

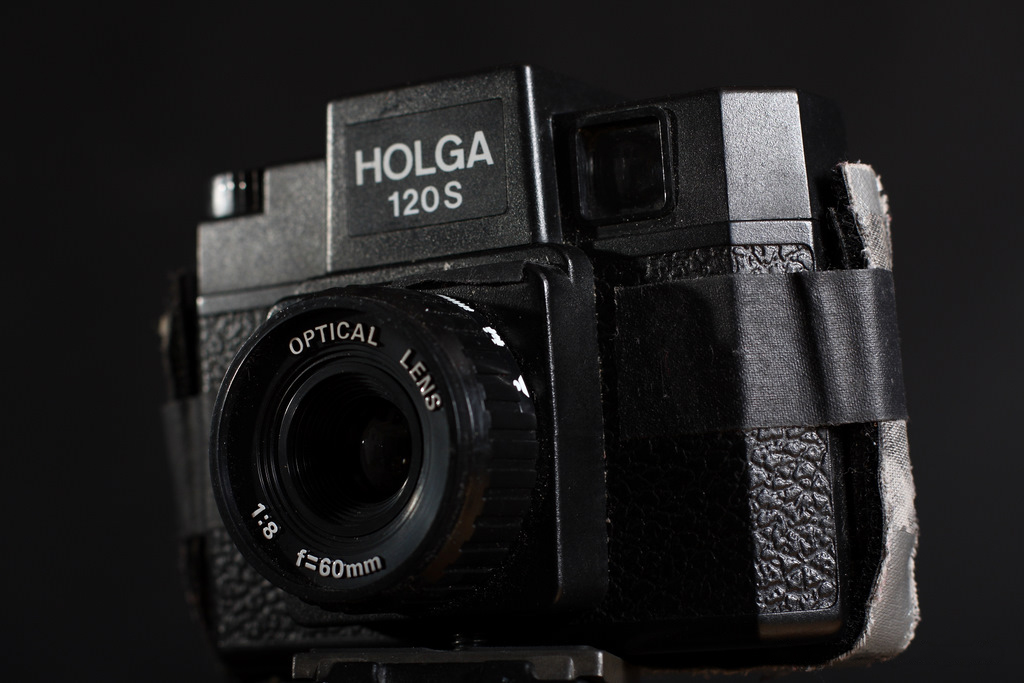
120S adapted with tape in order to prevent too many light leaks

Holga cameras are often modified:

- A Holga's interior can be "flocked"—coated with matte black paint—in order to limit the effect of light bouncing off the plastic interior from light leaks.
- The red window on the camera back can be blocked by an improvised cover to eliminate light leaks when using panchromatic films
- The Holga's aperture switch can be modified as needed to provide a larger ('cloudy') or smaller ('sunny') aperture.
- The lens, and sometimes the entire shutter assembly, can be replaced with a pinhole (the "Pinholga").
- The plastic lens can be replaced with a glass version (the "Woca") or can be completely removed.
- Newer models of the camera come with multiple optional frame inserts (4.5 × 6 cm and 6 × 6 cm). Shooting without an insert can lead to problems keeping the 120 size film flat against the film plane.
- Inserting cardboard or foam or felt padding under or behind the film spool to provide proper film tensioning

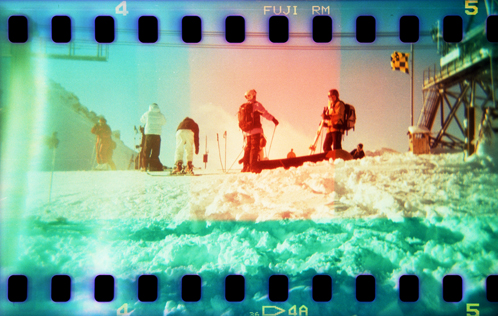
An example of a "sprocket hole" exposure when using 35 mm film in a modified Holga 120.

- The Holga TIM camera has two fixed focus plastic lenses which work simultaneously, allowing for the capture of 3D images.

Some modifications permit the use of other film formats:

- Holga cameras have been used for making wet plate collodion images, or "Holgatypes".
- Holga cameras may be fitted with a Polaroid back, allowing use of Polaroid 80 series instant film, or with newer models, 100 series film (but the image is not centered). This modification, sometimes termed a "Holgaroid" or "Polga", renders the viewfinder unusable, but allows for instant Holga prints.
- By sandwiching a normal 35 mm roll of film into the Holga's 120 spool, "sprocket hole" exposures may be taken that expose the entire surface of 135 film.
- Cameras such as the Hasselblad have been modified to make use of a Holga lens.
- Holga plastic lenses have also been adapted to the Canon EOS, the Nikon f-mount, Pentax, Sony, Olympus and Minolta. An f-mount, 'melted' plastic Holga lens has been used on a digital f-mount camera while the EOS Holga has been mounted to the latest Canon DSLRs. Adapted lenses are also commercially available.

=== Concept Holga D ===
In 2010, designer Saikat Biswas proposed a concept for a digital version of the Holga camera, called Holga D. It has a modernized case, but retains the simplicity of the original camera. However, there is no evidence of current plans to produce this device, or produce any other digital version.

=== Holga Digital ===
On 27 August 2015, a Kickstarter campaign was launched to fund the creation of a digital camera styled after a Holga 120, called the Holga Digital. This model includes a glass optic with f/2.8 and f/8 aperture settings and a sliding switch that alternates between black and white and color mode. It has a low-noise CMOS color sensor with an 8-megapixel resolution. The camera does not have a means of viewing the pictures saved to its SD Card.

=== Holga Lens ===
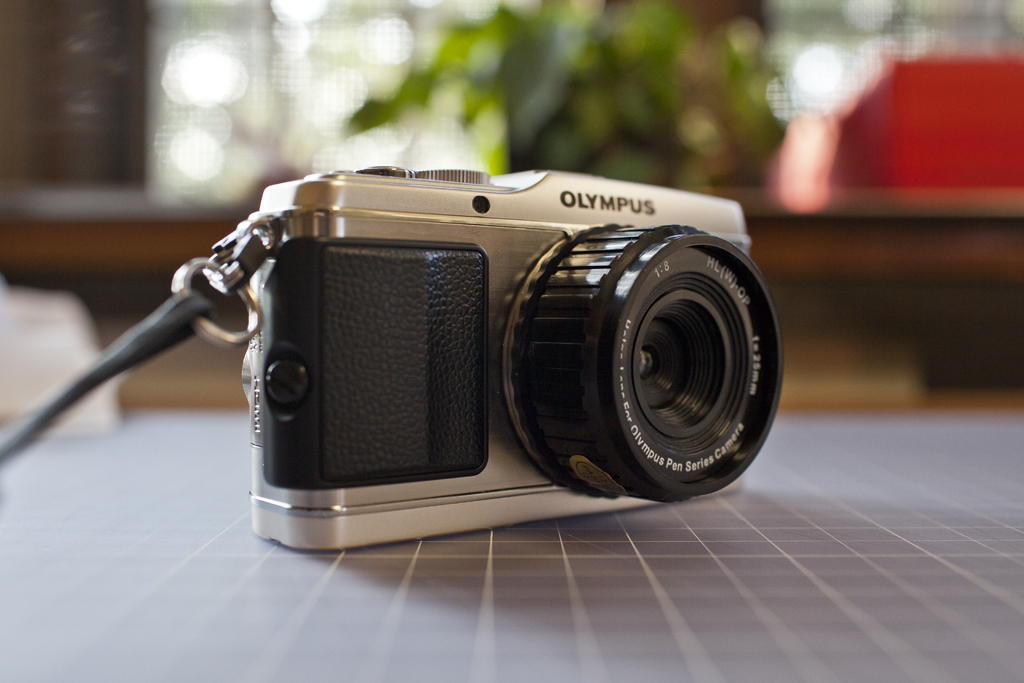
Olympus digital Camera with Holga lens

There are also available Holga lenses for digital cameras.

== Accessories ==
Accessories exist that will do the same thing as a modified Holga without the need for physical modifications as well as accessories for special effects. Such accessories include:

- Cable release, which slips onto the lens so that a cable release can depress the shutter. Also includes tripod mount since the Holga 120N's mount is covered by the accessory.
- 35 mm Film Adapter, available in two models: full negative and "panoramic." Both adapters come with a light-proof back and a mask made to hold the 135 canister in place. The only difference between the two models is the size of the mask. The "panoramic" adapter will mask out the sprocket holes. A rarer model available in Japan is an all-in-one back and cartridge unit.
- Fisheye lens, produces circular Fisheye images.
- Filter holder and filters. Filter holders can hold one or two filters, depending on the model of the holder. Filters come in special effect filters, color filters, and center spot filters (which leaves a normal center, but a colored surrounding).
- Holgon Flash, a small normal flash for Holgas with a hot shoe.
- Holgon Strobe Flash, a bulky flash which features multi flash strobe (which keeps flashing as long as the shutter stays open in bulb mode) or single flash (a more powerful flash, which will flash once on pressing the shutter and a second time on release). Features vertical adjustable angles.
- Holgon Slave Flash, a small, round slave flash meant for placing on a surface or handheld. Good for any kind of secondary light. Some units will come with multi colored filters to place over the flash.
- Camera bags, available in a small and a large size.
- Holga Enlargers, an inexpensive darkroom enlarger with two available lenses and several masks/negative carriers for both 120 and 35 mm formats.
- Holga iPhone Filter and Case was released at the end of 2011 and has opened up a new market for Holga accessories (smartphone)

== Observation ==
Holga Week is observed in the first week of October, every year. Holga cameras are also celebrated on World Toy Camera Day, which is celebrated every year on October 20.

== See also ==
- The Kodak Brownie was a popular 'toy' camera available from 1900 to the 1960s.
- The Diana camera (and clones), the Holga predecessor 'toy' camera of the 1960s
- List of photographic equipment makers
- Lomography
