= Fogging (photography) =

Secondary exposure of undeveloped film to light

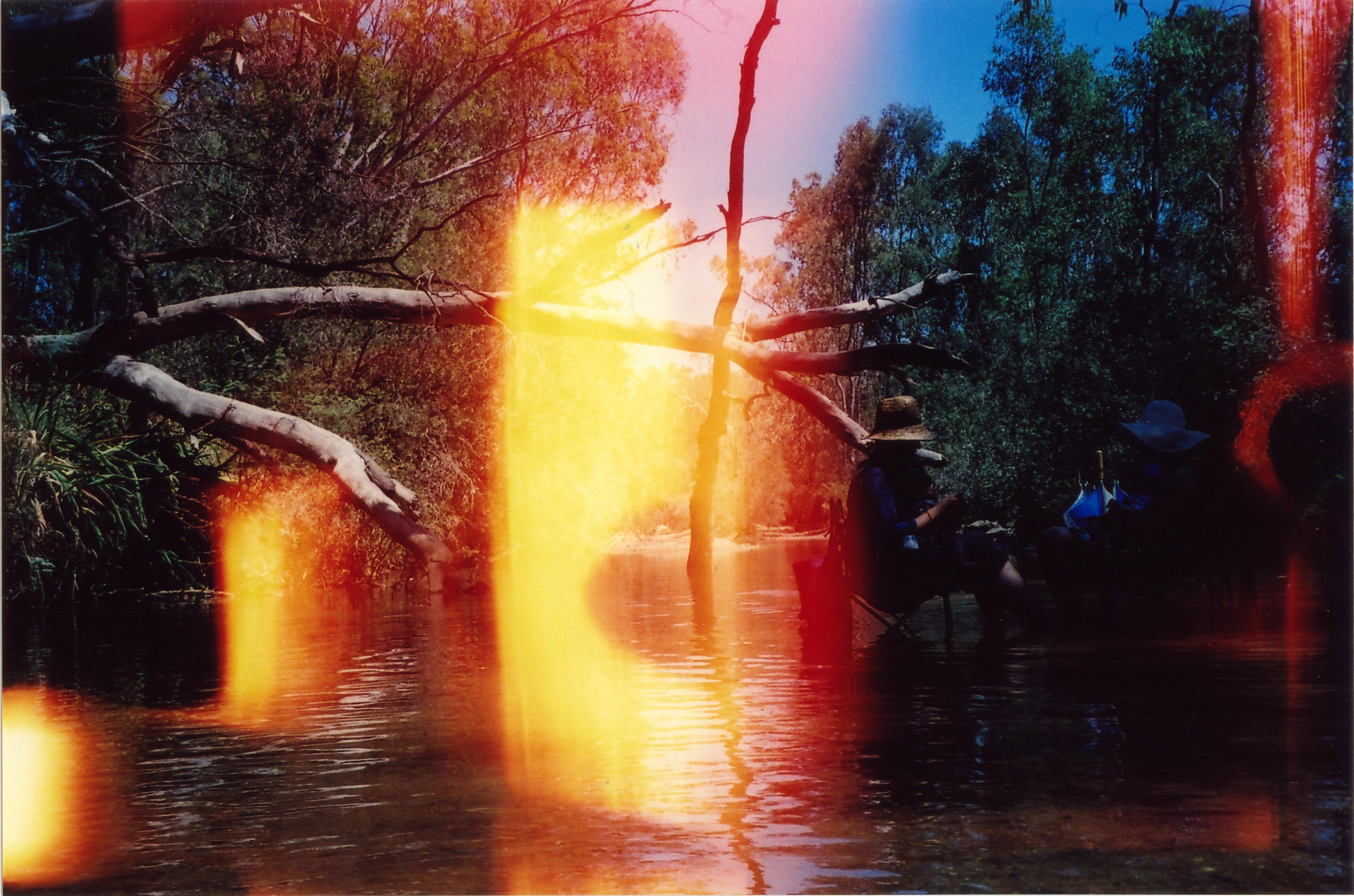
Light leaks in the camera have caused light fogging in this image.

Fogging in photography is the deterioration in the quality of the image or the negative caused either by extraneous light, other electromagnetic radiation, radioactivity or the effects of a processing chemical. It is seen either as deposition of silver or dyes across all or part of the image unrelated to the original exposure. It can be confused with chemical staining that can be produced from poorly compounded developer, contamination of processing baths or poor washing after processing.

== Light ==
Light leaks, or light fogging, is where unintended light reaches the photographic material prior to processing is seen as dark areas in the negative which tend to occur over the full width of the film including the margins. This can occur to the film in the camera because of a defect in the manufacture or use of the camera and is seen as dark areas in the negative which tend to occur over the full width of the film including the margins. In 35 mm film, shadowing from the sprocket holes may be seen on the film.

Light fogging on a print usually only occurs because of poor control of lighting in the darkroom and is seen as an overall dark veil across the print or, occasionally, as unintended Sabattier effect. Poor management of paper stocks or poor process control during printing are other causes.

== Radiation and radioactivity ==
The discovery of X-rays by Wilhelm Röntgen occurred when it was noticed that some fluorescent material lit up at some distance from an experimental cathode ray tube experiment. Subsequent work showed that a radiation was emitted that fogged covered photographic plates.

Henri Becquerel, who had been investigating fluorescence, observed that a sample of a uranium containing fluorescent material placed on a wrapped photographic plate caused it to be fogged when developed. He assumed that the fluorescence was somehow involved. However, when the experiment was repeated when no fluorescence was present, the plates were still equally fogged. This led to the discovery of radioactivity.

== Chemical ==
Chemical fogging can occur at the processing stage when old or spent chemicals are used, chemicals are used in the wrong sequence, there is inadequate washing between processing stages or inappropriate chemicals are used. Because of the wide range of causes, the effects can be diverse ranging from coloured streaks and blotches through to the lack of an image or a totally black image. The most common cause is the use of old or spent chemistry which often results in a lack of contrast. It is often associated with chemical staining which may produce an undesirable background colour - usually brown.

Dichroic fog is a type of fogging produced during development, especially when using developers with chemical solvent components. It is evident as an often metallic layer which may appear red or green by reflected or transmitted light and consists of a very thin film of metallic silver redeposited onto the film. It can develop over many years and may also be caused by poor fixing or poor washing of the material.

== Intentional fogging ==
In reversal processing, the material is fogged before the second developer. Traditionally this was done by exposure to light, but modern colour reversal processing such as the E-6 process uses a chemical fogging agent in conjunction with the colour developer which converts all the unexposed silver halides into silver and simultaneously synthesizing dye in the relevant layers in proportion to the silver produced.

== See also ==
- Photographic processing
- Photography
- Latent image
