= Mitra Abbaspour =

American art curator

Academic background
- Education: Scripps College; University of California, Riverside, CUNY Graduate Center

Academic work
- Discipline: Art curation
- Institutions: UCR/California Museum of Photography; Museum of Modern Art; Princeton University Art Museum; Harvard Art Museums

Mitra Monir Abbaspour is an American art curator and specialist in art history of the Middle East who is the Houghton Curator of Modern and Contemporary Art and head of the Harvard Art Museums’ division of modern and contemporary art.

== Life ==
Abbaspour earned with a B.A. in studio art and art history from Scripps College in 1999. She studied abroad in 1998 in Madrid where she interned for the director of the Galerîa Metta. In 2000, Abbaspour designed an educational database of the permanent collection of the University of California, Riverside (UCR) Sweeney Art Gallery. She earned a master's degree in art history from UCR in 2001. Her master's thesis was titled, Trans-national, cultural, and corporeal spaces: the territory of the body in the artwork of Shirin Neshat and Mona Hatoum.

Abbaspour was an assistant curator, museum writer, and director of public relations at the UCR/California Museum of Photography. She later became an associate curator at the Museum of Modern Art. She earned a M.Phil in art history from the CUNY Graduate Center.

In 2016, Abbaspour became the Haskell Curator of Modern and Contemporary Art at the Princeton University Art Museum. In August 2023, she was named the Houghton Curator of Modern and Contemporary Art and head of the Harvard Art Museums’ division of modern and contemporary art. She begins the role on September 11.
