= Vignetting =

Darkening an image's periphery versus the center

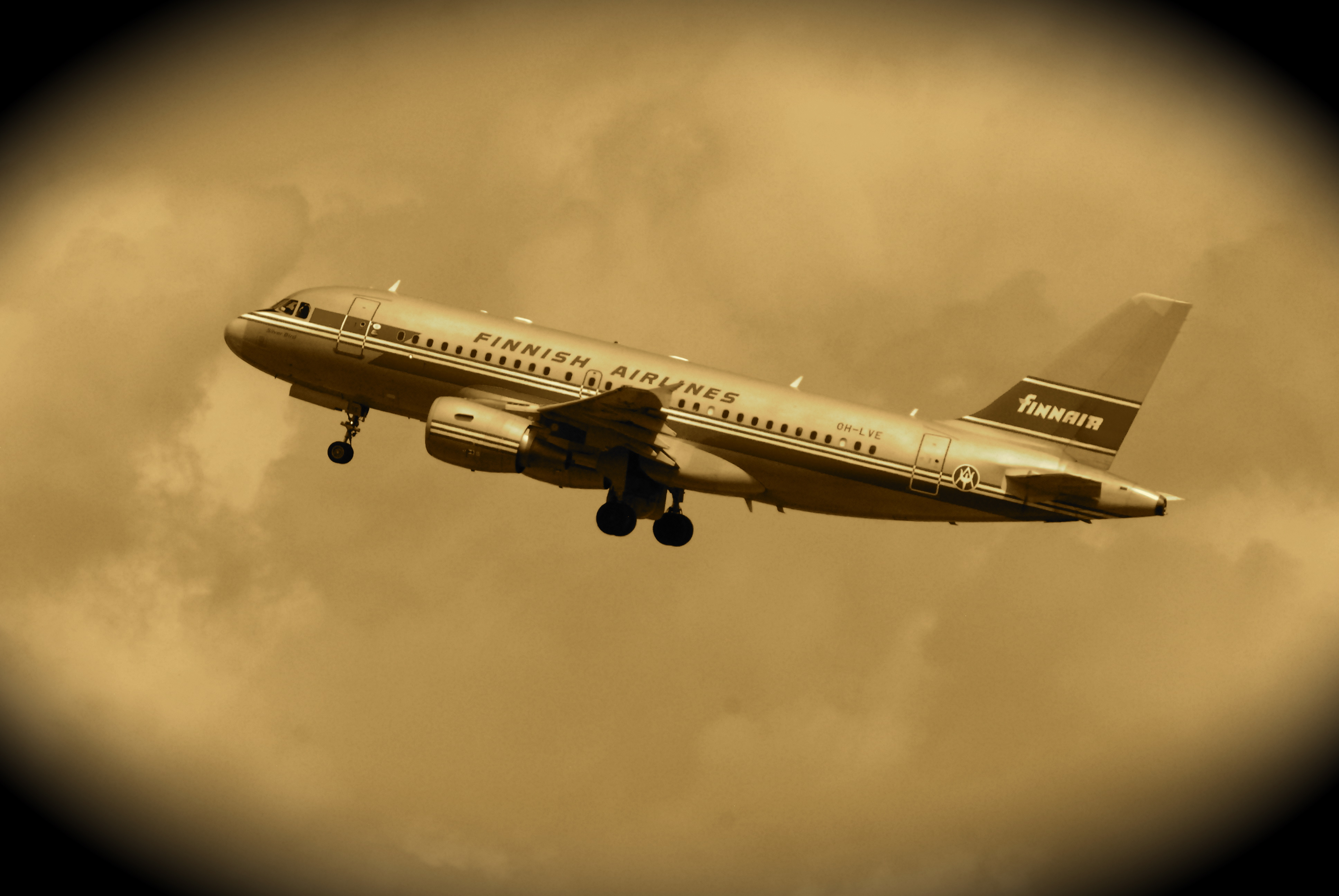
A vignette is often added to an image to draw interest to the center and to frame the center portion of the photo.

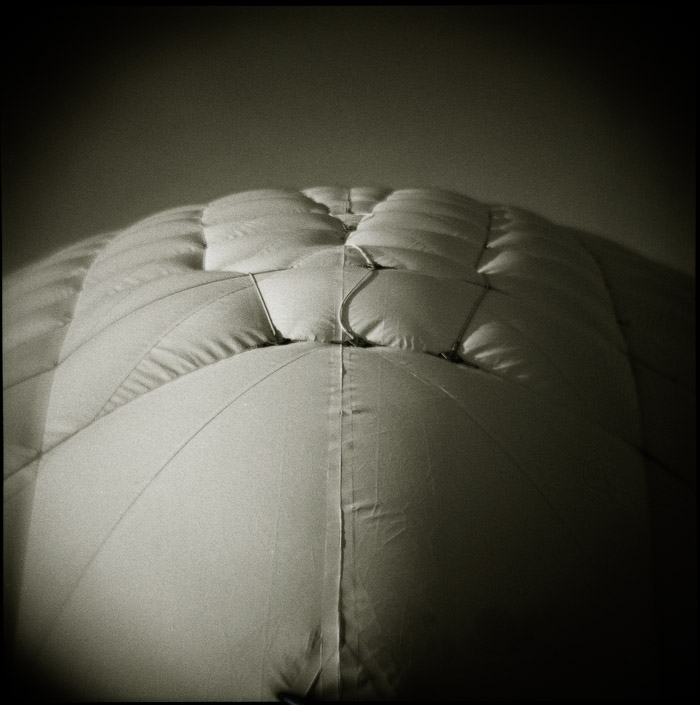
Vignetting is a common feature of photographs produced by toy cameras such as this shot taken with a Holga.

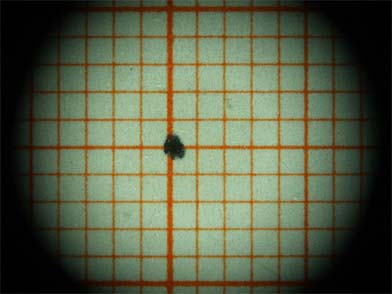
This example shows both vignetting and restricted field of view (FOV). Here a "point-and-shoot camera" is used together with a microscope to create this image. Pronounced vignetting (fall off in brightness towards the edge) is visible as the optical system is not well adapted. A further circular restriction of the FOV is visible (the black area in the image).

In photography and optics, vignetting (/vɪnˈjɛtɪŋ/ vin-YET-ing) is a reduction of an image's brightness or saturation toward the periphery compared to the image center. The word vignette, from the same root as vine, originally referred to a decorative border in a book. Later, the word came to be used for a photographic portrait that is clear at the center and fades off toward the edges. A similar effect is visible in photographs of projected images or videos off a projection screen, resulting in a so-called "hotspot" effect.

Vignetting is often an unintended and undesired effect caused by camera settings or lens limitations. However, it is sometimes deliberately introduced for creative effect, such as to draw attention to the center of the frame. A photographer may deliberately choose a lens that is known to produce vignetting to obtain the effect, or it may be introduced with the use of special filters or post-processing procedures.

When using zoom lenses, vignetting may occur all along the zoom range, depending on the aperture and the focal length. However, it may not always be visible, except at the widest end (the shortest focal length). In these cases, vignetting may cause an exposure value (EV) difference of up to 3EV.

== Causes ==
There are several causes of vignetting. Sidney F. Ray distinguishes the following types:

- Mechanical vignetting
- Optical vignetting
- Natural vignetting

A fourth cause is unique to digital imaging:

- Pixel vignetting

=== Mechanical vignetting ===
Mechanical vignetting occurs when light beams emanating from object points located off-axis (laterally or vertically off from the optical axis of an optical system under consideration) are partially blocked by external objects of the optical system such as thick or stacked filters, secondary lenses, and improper lens hoods. This has the effect of changing the entrance pupil shape as a function of angle (resulting in the path of light being partially blocked). Darkening can be gradual or abrupt – the smaller the aperture, the more abrupt the vignetting as a function of angle.

When some points on an image receive no light at all due to mechanical vignetting (the paths of light to these image points is completely blocked), then this results in a restriction of the Field of View (FOV) – parts of the image are then completely black.

=== Optical vignetting ===
This type of vignetting is caused by the physical dimensions of a multiple element lens. Rear elements of the lens are shaded by elements in front of them, which reduces the effective lens opening for off-axis incident light. The result is a gradual decrease in light intensity towards the image periphery. Optical vignetting is sensitive to the lens aperture and can often be cured by a reduction in aperture of 2–3 stops (an increase in the F-number).

=== Natural vignetting ===
Unlike the previous types, natural vignetting (also known as natural illumination falloff) is not due to the blocking of light rays. The falloff is approximated by the cos^{4} or "cosine fourth" law of illumination fall off. Here, the light fall off is proportional to the fourth power of the cosine of the angle at which the light impinges on the film or sensor array. For example, at a chief-ray angle of 15° the illumination is about 87% of that at the center of the image, and at 30° about 56%. Wide angle rangefinder designs and the lens designs used in compact cameras are particularly prone to natural vignetting. Telephoto lenses, retrofocus wide angle lenses used on SLR cameras, and telecentric designs in general are less troubled by natural vignetting. A gradual grey filter or postprocessing techniques may be used to compensate for natural vignetting, as it cannot be cured by stopping down the lens. Some modern lenses are specifically designed so that the light strikes the image perpendicular or nearly so, eliminating or greatly reducing vignetting.

=== Pixel vignetting ===
In digital cameras, light that strikes a pixel in the camera's image sensor perpendicular to its surface produces a stronger signal than light hitting it at an oblique angle. This creates a fall-off with angle in addition to natural vignetting. Most digital cameras use built-in image processing to compensate for optical vignetting and pixel vignetting when converting raw sensor data to standard image formats such as JPEG or TIFF. The use of offset microlenses over the image sensor can also reduce the effect of pixel vignetting. Lens designs for digital sensors therefore try to keep the angle at which the chief rays strike the sensor small, typically below 5 to 7°.

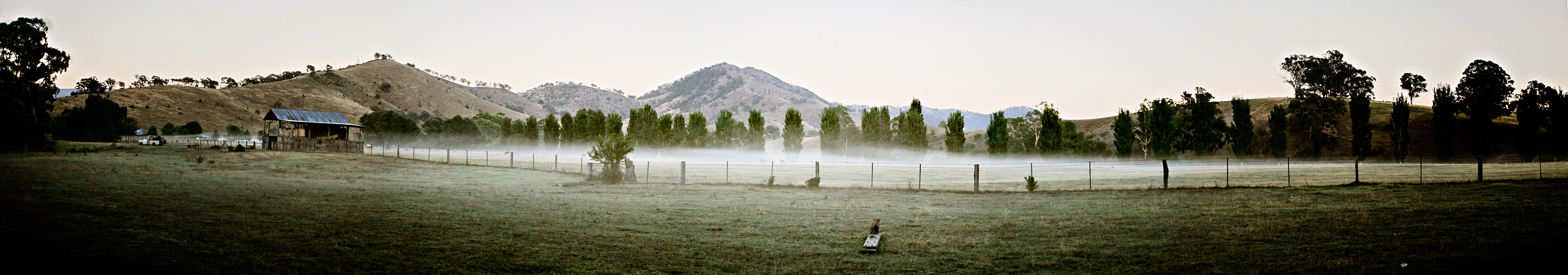
Vignetting can be used to artistic effect, as demonstrated in this panorama.

== Post-shoot ==
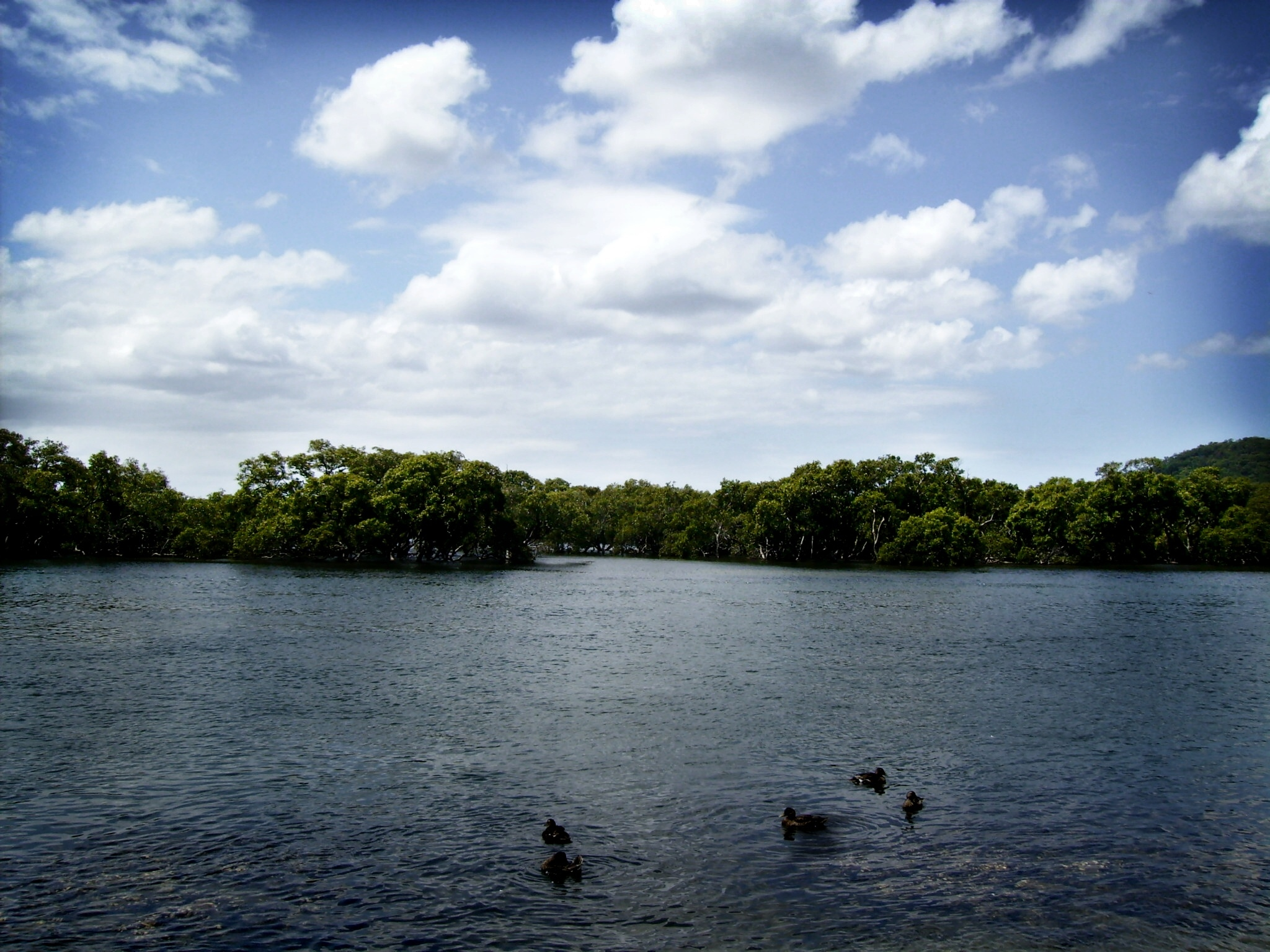
Vignetting can be applied in the post-shoot phase with digital imaging software.

Vignetting is sometimes applied to an otherwise un-vignetted photograph by burning the outer edges of the photograph (with film stock) or using digital imaging techniques, such as masking darkened edges. The Lens Correction filter in Photoshop can be used for this.

This can be done for artistic effect, to create a low fidelity or 'retro' appearance in the picture. Post-shoot vignetting can also be used more subtly, to guide the viewer's eyes to an intended center of interest in the photograph. A barely perceptible darkening of bright features near the edges of an image can "fence off" the bright area and keep the viewer's eyes where the photographer wants, without the vignetting being obvious.

== See also ==
- Dodging and burning
- Feathering
- Flat-field correction
- Metering mode
- Vignette (philately)
