= Light leak =

Effect of a hole in a camera causing excess diffusion of light and overexposure

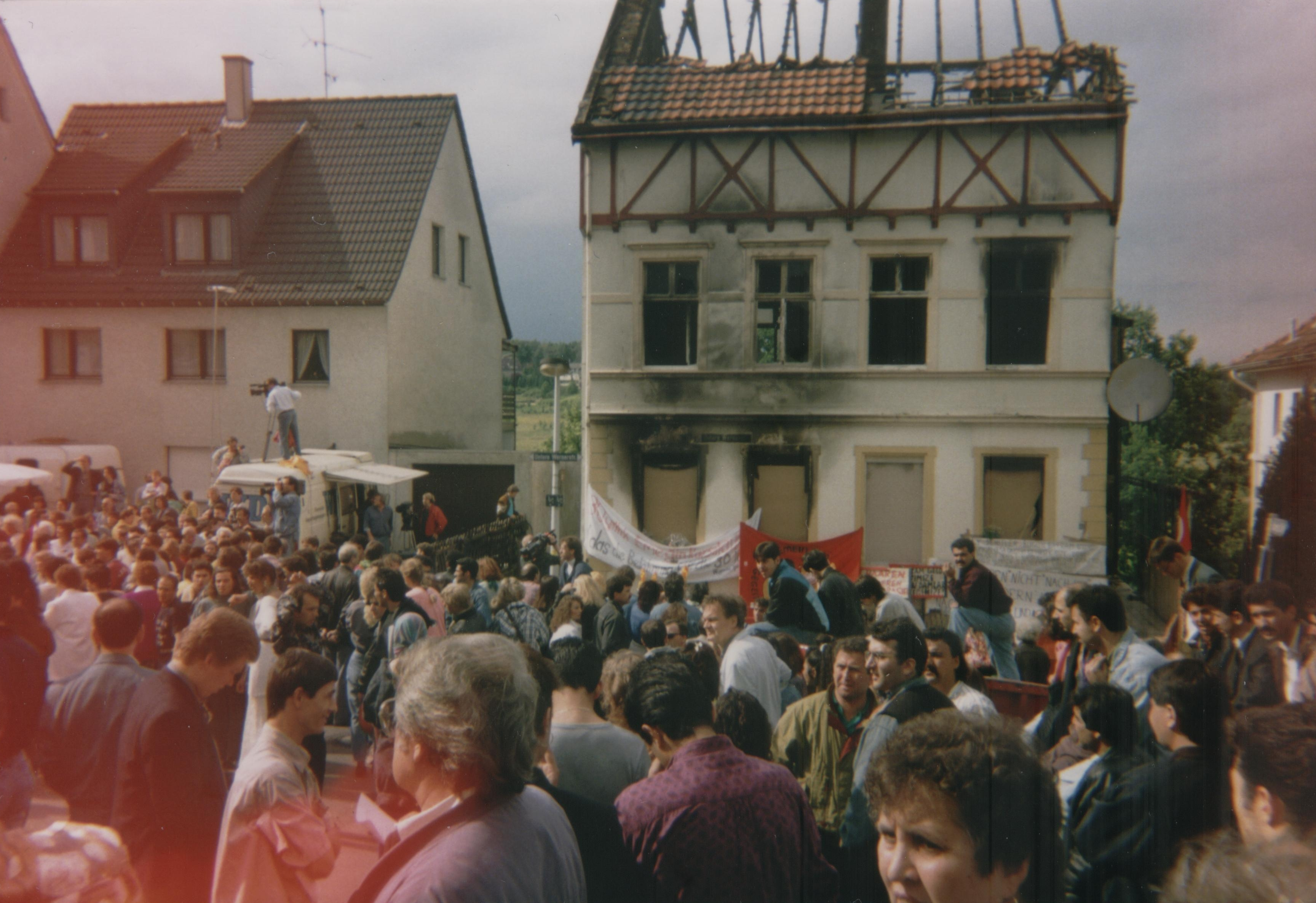
Light leak causing red glare

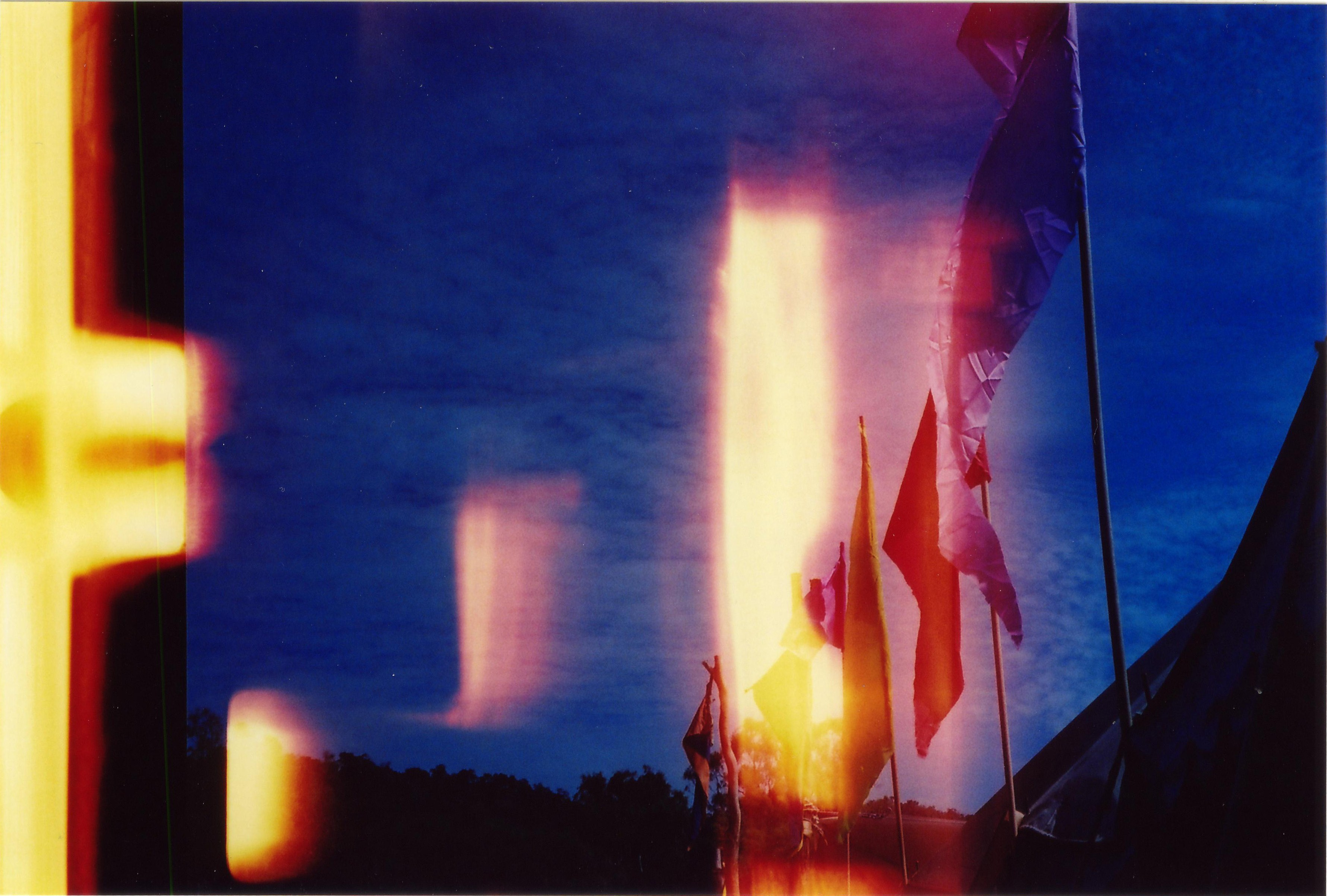
Light leak caused by deteriorating light seals in an old 35mm film camera

A light leak is a hole or gap in the body of a camera, or other optical instrument, where light is able to "leak" into the normally light-tight chamber, exposing the film or sensor with extra light and causing fogging. This light is diffused, although parts within the camera may cast shadows or reflect it in a particular way. For most purposes this is considered a problem. Within the lomography movement it is seen as a positive effect, giving photos character.

One frequent source of light leaks in 35 mm cameras is around the film door due to degrading foam. Medium format system cameras or large format cameras may have leaks between their various interchangeable parts or in old leather bellows. Electrical tape is often used to repair light leaks in these cases.

A light leak, considered as a problem, is a kind of stray light. It is possible to have a "virtual" light leak in spectral regions, like portions of the IR spectrum at room temperature, where surfaces inside the system emit significant amounts of radiation.

They can be created and emulated in digital photography and videography, either during production or after. In the first instance, the photographer or videographer removes the camera lens while photographing or recording and overloads the image sensor. This is usually used to create leaks which can then be overlaid onto another image or video. Or they can be created entirely digitally, with common photo-editing software packages such as Adobe Photoshop, and overlaid into the image.
