= Lomo =

Lomo or LOMO may refer to:

- Lomo, California (disambiguation)

== Food ==
- Lomo (meat), meat from the loin
  - Caña de lomo, Spanish cured pork tenderloin
  - Lomo saltado, a Peruvian sauteed dish
  - Lomo a lo pobre, a Peruvian and Chilean dish of grilled beef

== People ==
- Terje Lømo (born 1935), Norwegian physiologist
- Tony Lomo (born 1983), Solomon Islands judoka

== Technology ==
- LOMO, a Russian manufacturer of optical instruments
- Lomo LC-A, a 35mm film camera by LOMO
- Lomography, a style of photography, originally based on the camera
