= Analog photography =

Non-digital photography that uses film or chemical emulsions

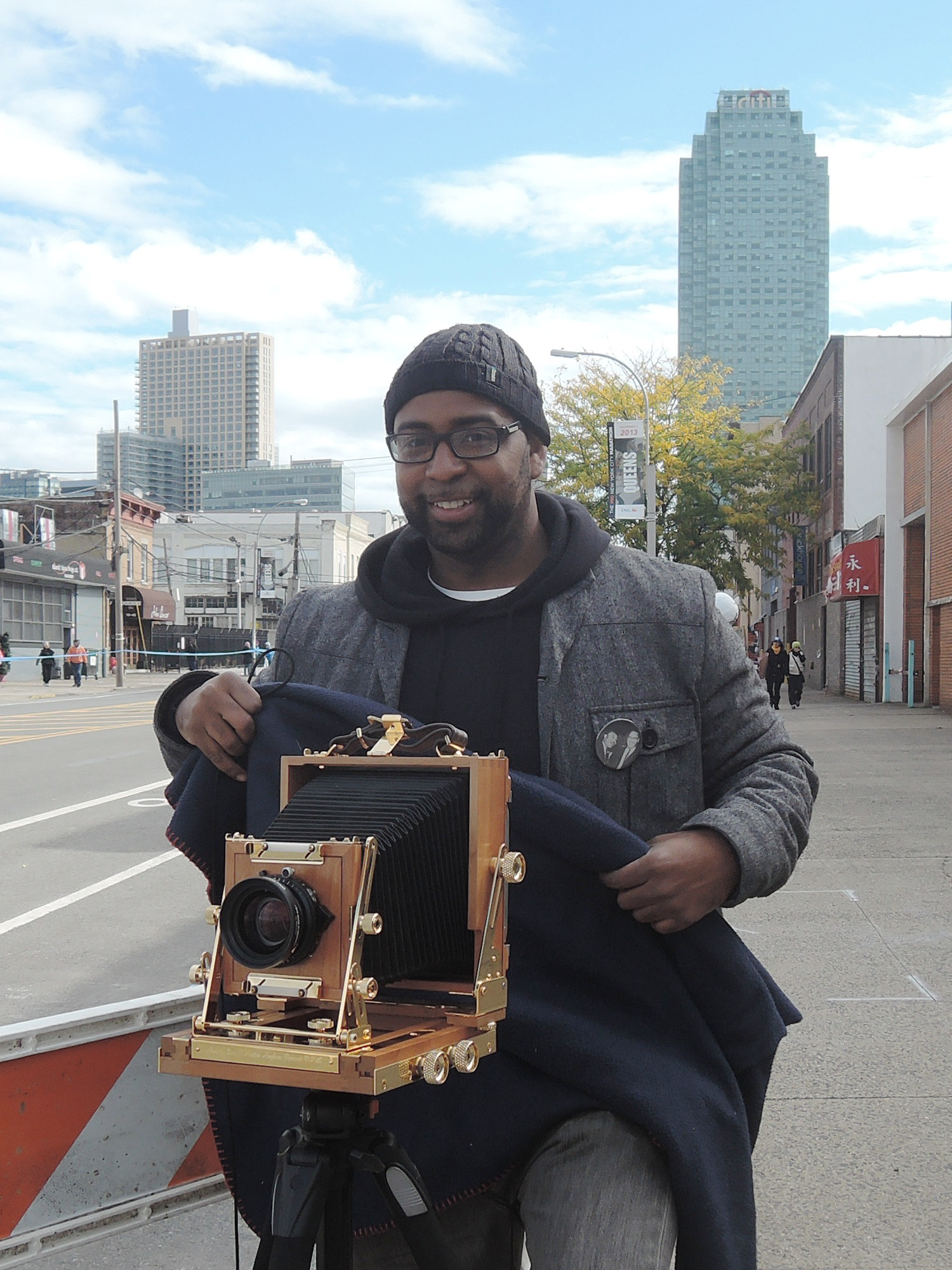
A photographer using a large format view camera in 2013

Film photography, or classical photography, also known by the retronym analog photography, is a term usually applied to photography that uses chemical processes to capture an image, typically on paper, gelatin film, or a hard plate. These processes were the only methods available to photographers for more than a century prior to the invention of digital photography, which uses electronic sensors to record images to digital media. Analog electronic photography was sometimes used in the late 20th century but soon died out.

Photographic films utilize silver halide crystals suspended in an emulsion, which, when exposed to light, record a latent image, which is then processed, making it visible and insensitive to light.

Despite a steep decline in popularity since the advent of digital photography, film photography has seen a limited resurgence due, in part, to social media and the ubiquity of digital cameras. With the renewed interest in traditional photography, new organizations (Film Is Not Dead, Lomography) were established and new lines of products helped to perpetuate film photography. In 2017 B&H Photo & Video stated that film sales were increasing by 5% each year in the recent past.

== Decline and revival ==
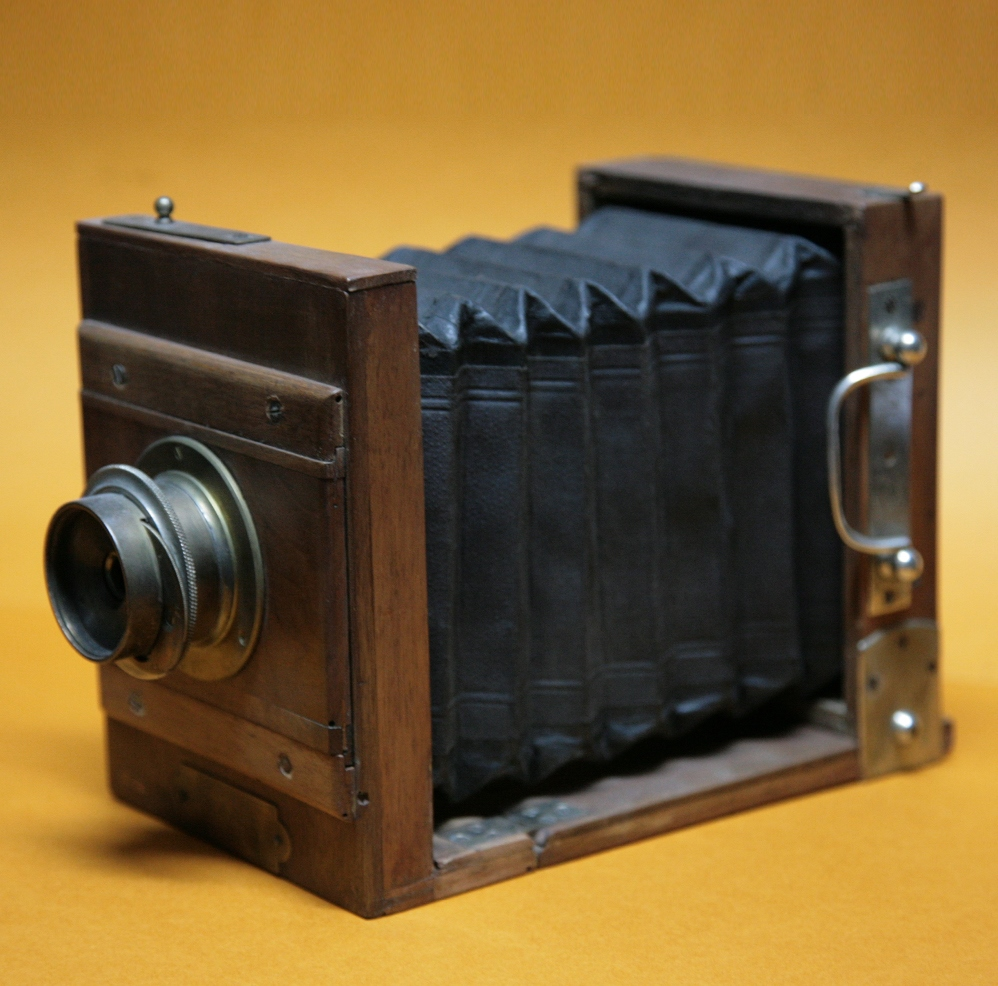
A wet plate camera made in 1866

As digital photography took over, Kodak, the major photographic film and cameras producer, announced in 2004 that it would stop selling and manufacturing traditional film cameras in North America and Europe. In 2006, Nikon, the Japanese Camera maker announced that it would stop making most of its film cameras. Incurring losses in the film camera line, Konica-Minolta too announced its discontinuation of cameras and film. In 2008 the first instant film maker Polaroid announced it would stop making instant film.

Interest in all types of film photography has been in the process of revival. The Lomography movement started in 1992, which, BBC claimed, has saved film from disappearing. Lomography started manufacturing updated versions of toy cameras like Lomo LC-A (as Lomo LC-A+), Diana (as Diana F+), Holga, Smena and Lubitel.

Film photographers started experimenting with old alternative photographic processes such as cyanotypes, double exposures, pinholes, and redscales. Worldwide Pinhole Photography Day is observed on the last Sunday of April, every year. Organizations such as Roll4Roll spread the artistic movement of double exposures.

Film Photography Project, a website dedicated to film photography, announced in 2017 the comeback of large-format cameras by a new startup called The Intrepid Camera Co. They sell relatively inexpensive beginner friendly partly 3D-Printed 4x5 and 8x10 Cameras and accompanying accessories.

=== Popularity ===
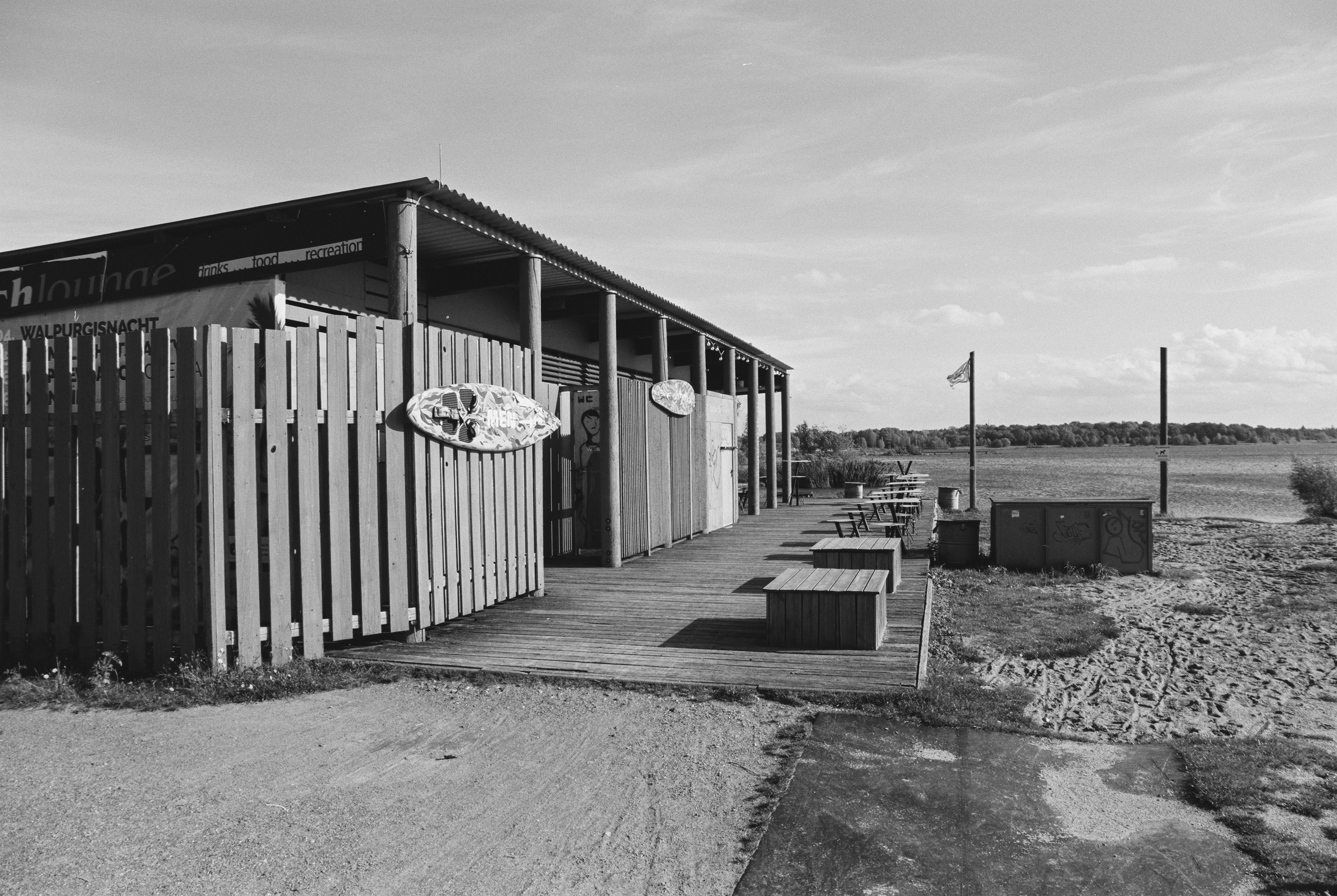
Contemporary film photo, 2017

For those who are keen to work with, or do work with more traditional types of photography, dedicated online communities have been established in which like-minded individuals together share and explore old photographic practices. Film photography has become more popular with younger generations who have become increasingly interested in the traditional photographic practice; sales in film-based cameras began to soar, and youth were seen to embrace some 19th-century technology. Young photographers say film has more 'soul' than digital. Camera manufacturers have also noticed the renewed interest for film, and new simple point-and-shoot film cameras for beginners, have started to appear.

Polaroid was once a power in instant photography. Facing the digital revolution, Polaroid stopped production of instant film in 2008. A new company called Impossible Project (now Polaroid through brand acquisition) acquired Polaroid's production machines to produce new instant films for vintage Polaroid cameras and to revive Polaroid film technologies.

=== Art forms ===
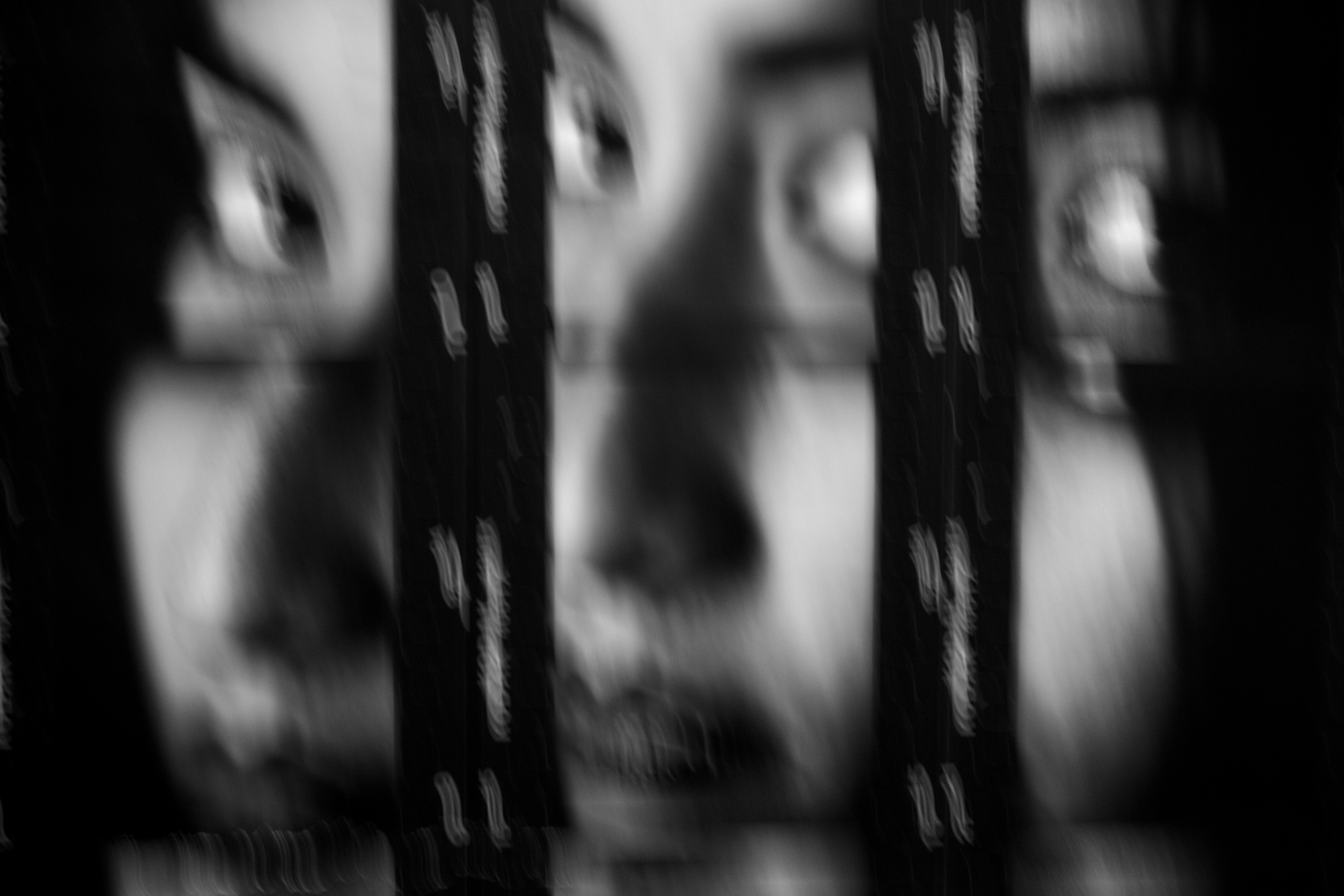
Namaka, contact sheet photograph combined with intentional camera movement

The revival of film photography has resulted in new art forms and photo challenges, as the technical limitations and constraints of film are used as parameters of the art. In the 36 (or sometimes 24) frames challenges, a single roll of film must capture a specific event, a time period, or serve as exercises to improve photography skills.

In contact sheet photography, the traditional contact sheet is used to produce a sheet consisting of partial photos. The resulting image spans the whole sheet, divided by the black borders of the film.

== Advantages and disadvantages ==
=== Advantages ===
- The time and expense of film photography instills craft and patience; pre-film even more so.
- Vintage film cameras offer a tactile, hands-on experience that feels more deliberate and engaging.
- Each film stock delivers a distinct and consistent aesthetic that is difficult to achieve in digital photography.
- Depending on the film sensitivity one can obtain a wide dynamic range.
- A film-printed (non-editable) image can help as legal evidence of the subject pictured.
- In optimal processing and storage conditions, a film can have a lifetime duration.

=== Disadvantages ===
- Film photography requires photographers to invest more time and skill than digital.
- Film is delicate and requires careful handling, refrigeration, protection from the sun, protection from dust, etc.
- Film negatives and slides require proper developing, or they may suffer from deterioration such as fogging.
- Processing film is expensive and requires additional investment such as scanning, enlarging, or printing.

== Material ==
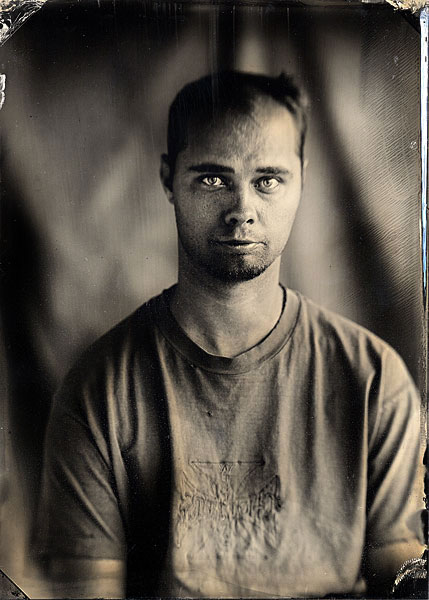
Contemporary tintype, 2004

Film photography does not just mean photographic film and its processing with photo chemicals. Itself a science and a craft of its own, changes in chemistry and developing time will affect the result. An example is tintype photography. A tintype, also called ferrotype, is a positive photograph produced by applying a collodion-nitrocellulose solution to a thin, black-enameled metal plate immediately before exposure. The tintype, introduced in the mid-19th century, was essentially a variation on the ambrotype, which was a unique image made on glass instead of metal. Just as the ambrotype was a negative whose silver images appeared grayish white and whose dark backing made the clear areas of shadows appear dark, so the tintype, actually a negative in its chemical formation, was made to appear positive by the black plate. These methods were not abandoned when film came to dominate photography.

Instant film develops an image automatically, and soon after it is ejected from the camera without any processing by the photographer or by a photographic lab. Photographic paper, however, must be processed after exposure in a dark room or photographic lab.

== Processes ==
Black-and-white negative film may be processed using a variety of different solutions as well as processing time control, depending on the film type, targeted contrast, or grain structure. Many B&W processing developers are still available commercially, among them are Dektol, D-76, Rodinal and Kodak HC-110. Color negative film often uses the C-41 process; however, film shot for movies is usually developed using the ECN-2 process. Color positive film uses the E-6 process, which yields color slides. In the past, Kodachrome was developed using a specialized color process usually done at labs operated by Kodak themselves. One developer bath was used for each color layer; this process is no longer commercially available.

Some photographers experiment with different processes such as cross processing, which can yield unnatural colors and unexpected contrast. Cross-processing film is when you develop film using a process it was not originally intended for, such as developing Color Positive film in C41 chemicals, to produce a negative rather than the intended positive, or color negative film in E-6 chemistry to get a positive.

Film processing does not use digital technology, since information is not translated into electric pulses of varying amplitude or binary data.

== Format ==
=== Photographic film ===
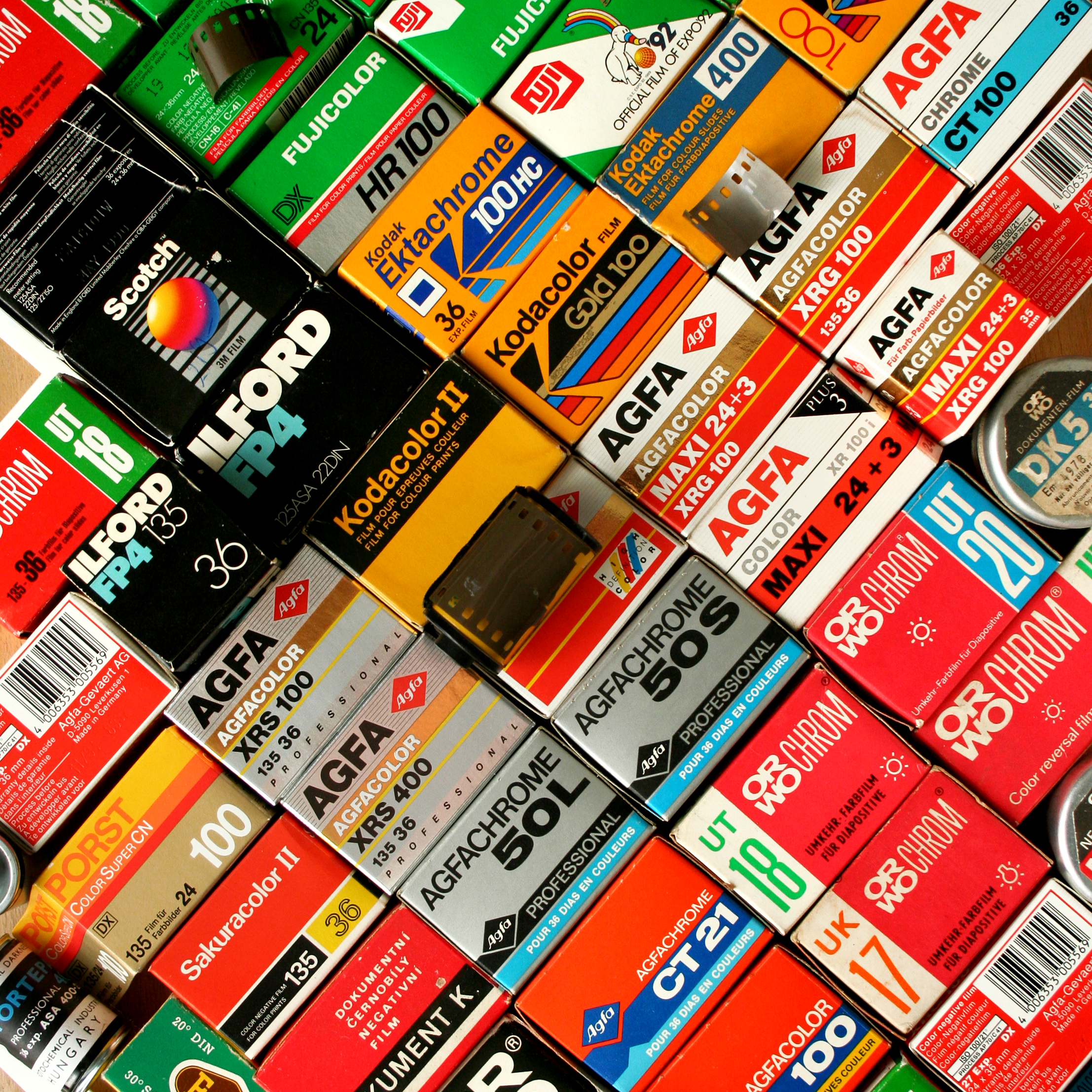
Photographic film, 1980s–1990s.

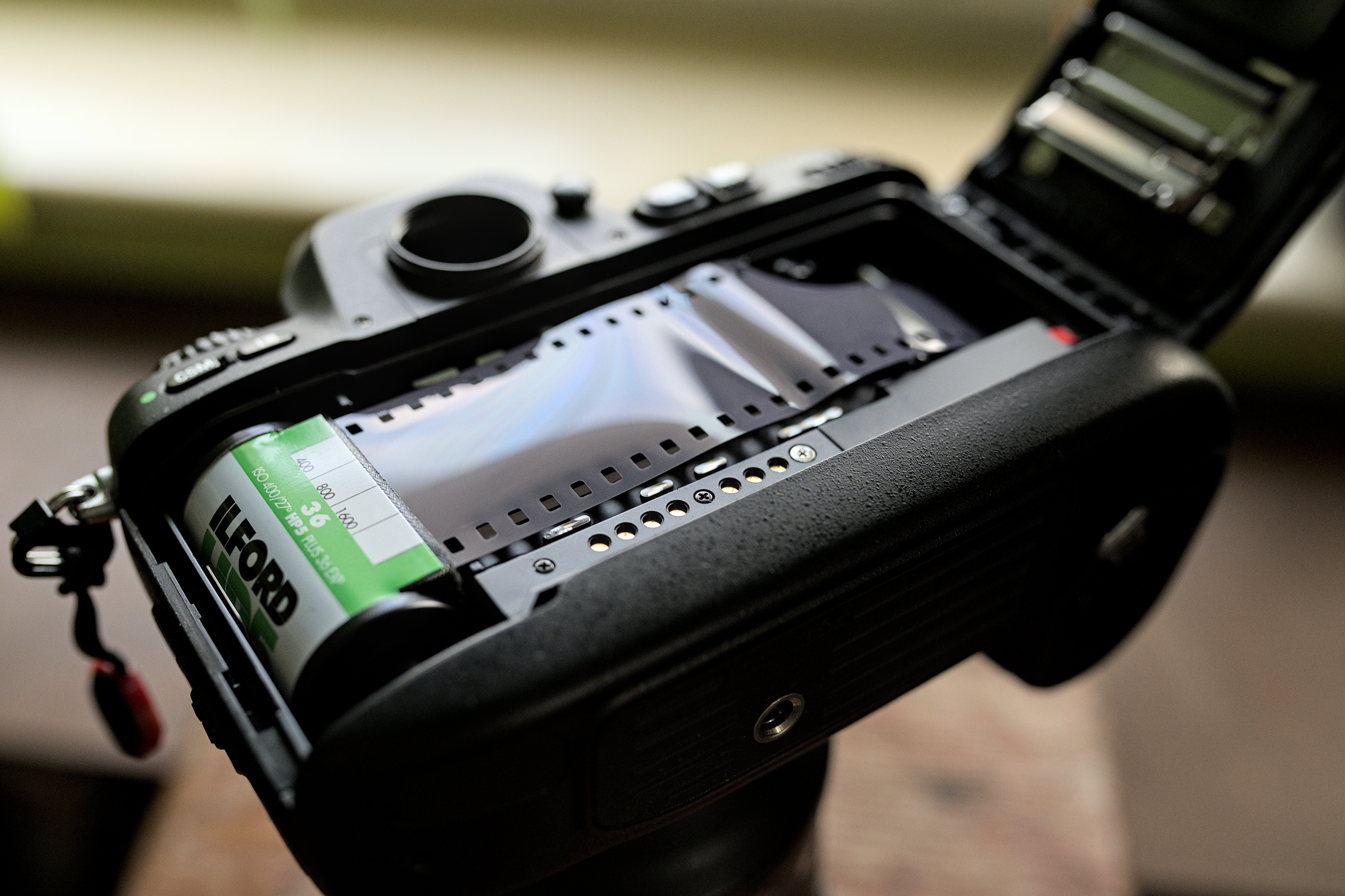
Nikon F100 being loaded with 35mm film

Types

Films can be any of the following types:

- Daylight, in both negative and reversal color films
- Tungsten, in both negative and reversal color films
- Infrared, mostly for black and white films

Silver-based film supports come in various formats, of which the following are still in use:

- 110 film (mono-perforated roll in plastic cassette)
- 135 film 35 mm (bi-perforated roll in metal can)
- 120 film 60 mm (non-perforated roll in paper sleeve)
- Large format 4x5" 5x8" 8x10" etc. (gelatin sheets).
- Super-8 (mono-perforated roll in plastic cassette)
- Cinema 16 mm / 35 mm (bi-perforated roll on metal spool)

A selection of Black-and-white films still produced as of 2026 includes:

- ADOX CHS 100 II
- ADOX CMS 20
- ADOX Silvermax
- ADOX HR-50
- CineStill BwXX
- Film Washi "W" 25
- FOMA FOMAPAN 100 Classic
- FOMA FOMAPAN 200 Creative
- FOMA FOMAPAN 400 Action
- FOMA FOMAPAN R 100
- FOMA RETROPAN 320 soft
- FujiFilm Neopan Acros 100
- Ilford Pan F Plus 50
- Ilford HP5 Plus 400
- Ilford FP4 Plus 125
- Ilford Delta 100
- Ilford Delta 400
- Ilford Delta 3200
- Ilford XP2 Super
- Ilford SFX 200
- Kentmere 100
- Kentmere 200
- Kentmere 400
- Kodak T-MAX 100
- Kodak TRI-X 400
- ORWO UN 54
- ORWO N 74 plus
- Rollei also markets a line of black-and-white films

Color films (mostly 135 and 120 formats) sold on the market in 2020 are:

- Fujichrome Velvia 50
- Fujichrome Provia 100F
- Kodak Ektachrome 100
- Kodak Ektar 100 Professional
- Kodak Portra 160 Professional
- Kodak Portra 400 Professional
- Kodak Portra 800 Professional
- Kodak Ultramax 400
- Kodak Color Plus 200
- Kodak Gold 200
- Kodak Vision-3 50D
- Kodak Vision-3 250D
- Kodak Vision-3 500T
- Cinestill 50 Daylight
- Cinestill 400 Dynamic
- Cinestill 800 Tungsten
- Lucky 200

== See also ==
- Analog signal
- Digitization
- Digital photography
