= Photochemical Factory "Foton", Bydgoszcz =

Polish photosensitive material factory

Coordinates: 53°07′04″N 17°58′52″E

Foton
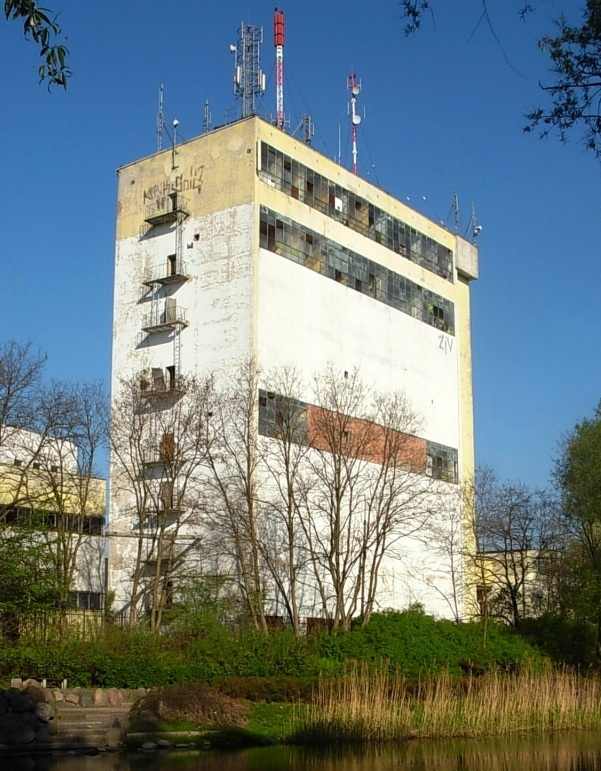
- View of the factory building from the Five ponds valley ("Dolina Pięciu Stawów w Bydgoszczy")
- Company type: Joint-stock company
- Industry: Photographic paper
- Founded: 1926
- Defunct: January 1, 2007, Bydgoszcz
- Fate: Taken over
- Headquarters: 13 Piękna Street, Bydgoszcz, Poland
- Products: Photographic paper

The Foton factory in Bydgoszcz, Poland, was the first Polish producer of photosensitive material on photographic paper. It was active from 1926 to 2007.

== History ==
=== Interwar period, "ALFA" Company ===
Marian Dziatkiewicz (1890–1956) came from Witków near Gniezno. Educated as an engineer in Poznań, he bought a factory of sweets and chocolate in Bydgoszcz at 3 Garbary Street in 1922. He lived nearby on Kącik Street. In the mid-1920s, he closed down the factory and in 1926 he founded one of Poland's first firms of photochemical articles, named "ALFA". In this endeavor, he was backed by Tadeusz Cyprian, a lawyer and an amateur photographer.

ALFA (Polish: Fabryka płyt, błon i papierów fotograficznych „Alfa") produced photographic plates, films, papers and chemicals. The high quality of "Alfa" products brought the company recognition, despite the fierce competition of foreign companies.

In the 1930s, Marian received a government loan for the expansion of the factory. During 1933 and 1934, he had a new plant built at 13 Piekna Street, which started operating circa 1938. After this expansion, the panel of products increased along with their quality, which compared to brands such as Kodak or Agfa. In 1934, the factory produced the first lot of X-ray photographic films and X-ray papers, as well as "Kinopozytyw" batches for the Polish cinema industry.

Marian Dziatkiewicz was hardworking, ambitious, and passionate. While increasing his production, he actively popularized the art of photography, publishing advertising materials, guides, reference books, photography manuals, and a magazine presenting new products. In particular, he published 120,000 copies of a free textbook realized by his mentor Tadeusz Cyprian.

At that time, the firm had five machines producing photographic emulsion and annually manufactured 1,000,000 square metres (250 acres) of photo papers and 30,000 square metres (7.4 acres) of photographic plates and films. The Great Depression only slightly affected the company, as it had no competitors in Poland. On the eve of WWII, the plant employed 300 people and operated at full capacity. In this period, Marian Dziatkiewicz had a representative office in Lviv (then in Poland). He also bought plots near Radom to build a facility there.

=== German occupation ===
During the German occupation, the factory passed under Nazi rule. It resumed production under the calling Fabrik Fotochemischer Erzeugnisse-"OPTA" (Photochemical Products Factory - "Opta").

At the outbreak of the conflict, German representatives from the company "Agfa" inspected the plants in Bydgoszcz and were surprised by the quality of the Polish products.

Marian Dziatkiewicz then moved to Warsaw and spent the entire time of the war there.

=== Polish People's Republic (1947–1989) ===
In 1945, Dziatkiewicz regained his company back for a short time, and "ALFA", still located at 3 Garbary Street, was soon nationalized and controlled by the state-owned enterprise "Film Polski" (Polish: Przedsiębiorstwo Państwowe Film Polski). The engineer moved to Wrocław, where he set up a firm that produced a drug needed for stomach x-rays, eventually this business was also grabbed by the government. Marian Dziatkiewicz died in 1956.

At the beginning of 1948, the company was renamed "FOTON". It then employed 188 people in Bydgoszcz, most of them from the previous personnel from pre-war "ALFA".

During this period, the catalog of products remained similar to pre-war times, including glass plates (e.g., "Omega", "Ultrapan"). It was still the only company of the industry in Poland: a second "FOTON" plant, based in Warsaw and heavily damaged by the war, was put back into operation in 1949. In this period, both "FOTON" facilities, in Bydgoszcz and Warsaw, were specialized: the Warsaw plant produced photosensitive materials for films (transparent substrate), while the Bydgoszcz plant dealt with papers, plates, and chemicals.

In the 1950s, "FOTON" still used wooden machines from the "ALFA" period. In the 1970s, the entire production was moved from Garbary to Piękna Street. The last manufacturing device from pre-war, "ALFA," stopped working in the early 1980s.

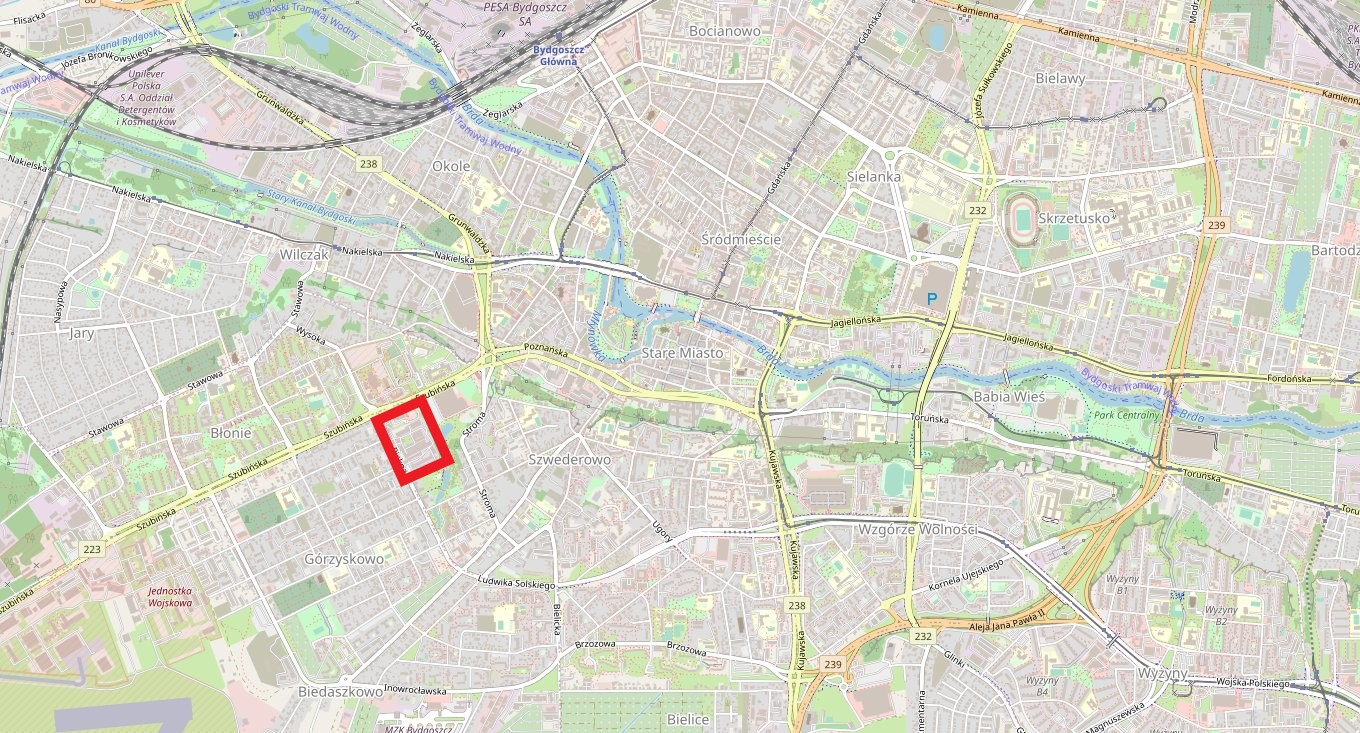
Foton building on a map of Bydgoszcz

The "Bydgoskie Zakłady Fotochemiczne" output increased fourfold between 1950 and 1965, reaching annually:

- 4,500,000 square metres (1,100 acres) of photo papers;
- 900 tons of chemicals;
- 30,000 square metres (7.4 acres) of photo plates.

Later on, the production relied on English technology, for which a license for industrial use was implemented in 1975.

In 1969, to fulfill the license requirements, the Ministry of Chemical Industry took over the factory, and a new production complex was built at 13 Piękna Street in Szwederowo district, Bydgoszcz. The building, although brand new, was equipped with old technology which dictated the layout of the production line, where semi-finished materials had to flow down from above. This point explains the choice of the design for the tower, similar to a skyscraper.

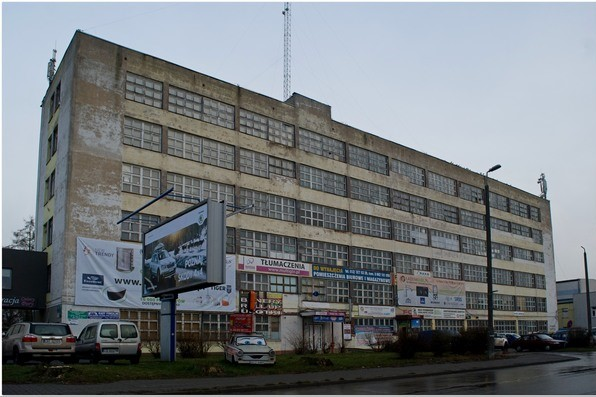
FOTON building viewed from Piękna Street

In the mid-1960s, the Warsaw plant ceased producing color photographic materials, and its manufacturing moved to Bydgoszcz, where the development of colored paper (called "Fotoncolor") was improved. Furthermore, the company set up a laboratory in charge of processing materials for customers from all over Poland.

"Bydgoskie Zakłady Fotochemiczne," together with the University of Technology in Wrocław (Phototechnical Department), successfully elaborated a native technology. Still, its implementation was hampered by the lack of specialized machinery in Poland, at the time, this equipment could only be purchased from Western countries.

In 1970 the company set up a new experimental plant within Bydgoszcz's premises. It aimed to meet the future needs of the Polish photochemical industry in terms of emerging technologies, as well as designing the associated producing devices. 1973 the facility was expanded; eventually, its output increased fivefold. By the end of the 1970s, "Bydgoskie Zakłady Fotochemiczne" laboratories formulated two types of negative films, "Foton Negatyw NB01" and "Foton Negatyw NB04", which were put on the Polish market in the 1980s. Additionally, the manufacture of specialized products started, such as items for electrocardiography or tapes for train event recorders. In 1976, the plant employed about 900 employees, primarily women.

The "FOTON" facility in Bydgoszcz reached its peak activity between 1960 and 1968. Around 20% of its production was exported during this period, mainly to India, Brazil, and Turkey. In the 1970s, purchasing countries were in the Middle East, North Africa, and Central America. By and large, exports flourished till 1985:

- Black and white photographic paper to the Soviet Union, Sweden, and the United States;
- Color paper to Bulgaria;
- Photographic film to Hungary, Yugoslavia, and Ecuador.

At the end of the 1980s, a significant amount of the production (i.e., color photography paper and processing chemicals) was earmarked for the Soviet market.

Before the collapse of the USSR and the Polish People's Republic, Bydgoszcz's FOTON belonged to the "Union of the Organic Industry Enterprises "Organika" (Polish: Zrzeszenie Przedsiębiorstw Przemysłu Organicznego „Organika"), based in Warsaw.

=== Third Polish Republic (since 1989) ===
On 28 February 1992, the facility moved into the hands of the Polish State Treasury as "FOTON SA". In 1997, Foma Bohemia, a photographic company based in Hradec Králové, Czech Republic, acquired the majority of the company's shares.

Following the fall of Communism in the 1990s, and the ensuing economic turmoils, the plant experienced difficulties due to the contraction of the analog photography market. Nonetheless, the production of specialized materials (medical imaging, speed recorders) continued.

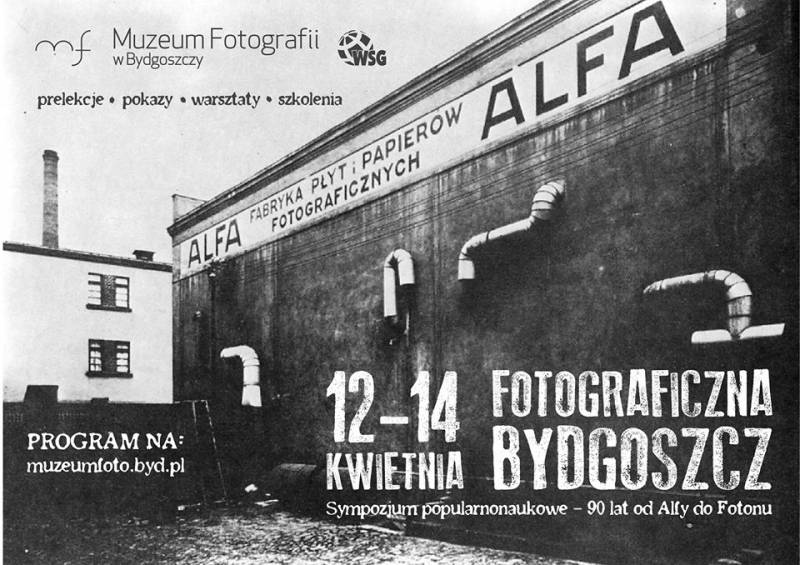
2016 Symposium for the 90th anniversary of the creation of "ALFA"

When nearly the entire market shifted to digital photography in the 21st century "FOTON SA" could not adjust. On 1 January 2007, the company declared bankruptcy. A similar fate befell the FOTON facility in Warsaw.

The same year, the commercial activity of "FOTON SA" was taken over by a new firm, "FOTON-BIS Sp. z o.o.", with headquarters at 13 Piękna Street in Bydgoszcz.

The "Bydgoszcz Museum of Photography" (Polish: Muzeum Fotografii w Bydgoszczy), established in 2004, keeps a large panel of "ALFA" and "FOTON" products, items, and paraphernalia in its collections.

In April 2016 the museum organized a symposium on the occasion of the 90th anniversary of the setup of the company "ALFA".

In October 2018, an exhibition titled "Women of FOTON" (Polish: Kobiety Fotonu) was organized by the "Bydgoszcz Museum of Photography".

== Characteristics ==
Bydgoszcz "Foton" produces photographic papers with various emulsion sensitivities. The plant is currently specialized in manufacturing:

- Photographic paper (black and white or with various types and shades) for enlargements and contact copies, professional and registration documents;
- Paper for color prints;
- Diverse-purpose photographic plates;
- Chemicals;
- Photosensitive materials, photographic glass, darkroom filters, and positive film materials.

== Gallery ==
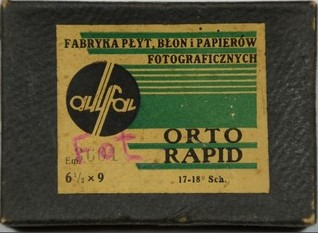
ALFA paper film

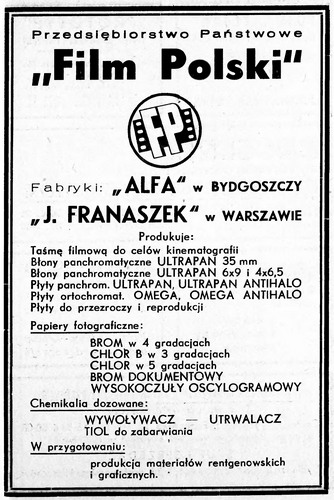
Advert for "Film Polski", a state-owned company that took over "ALFA" after WWII

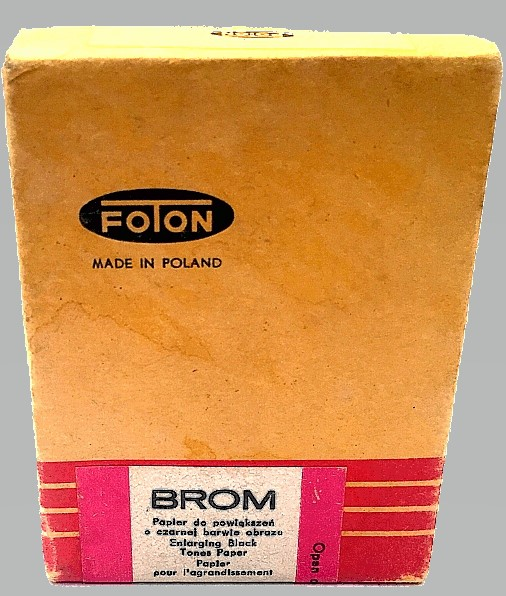
Brom paper film by "FOTON"

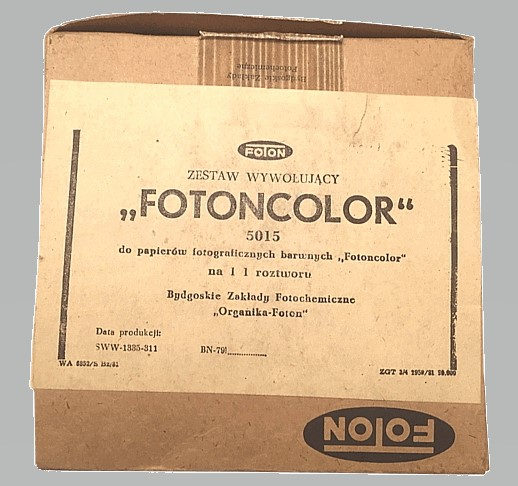
"Fotoncolor" product

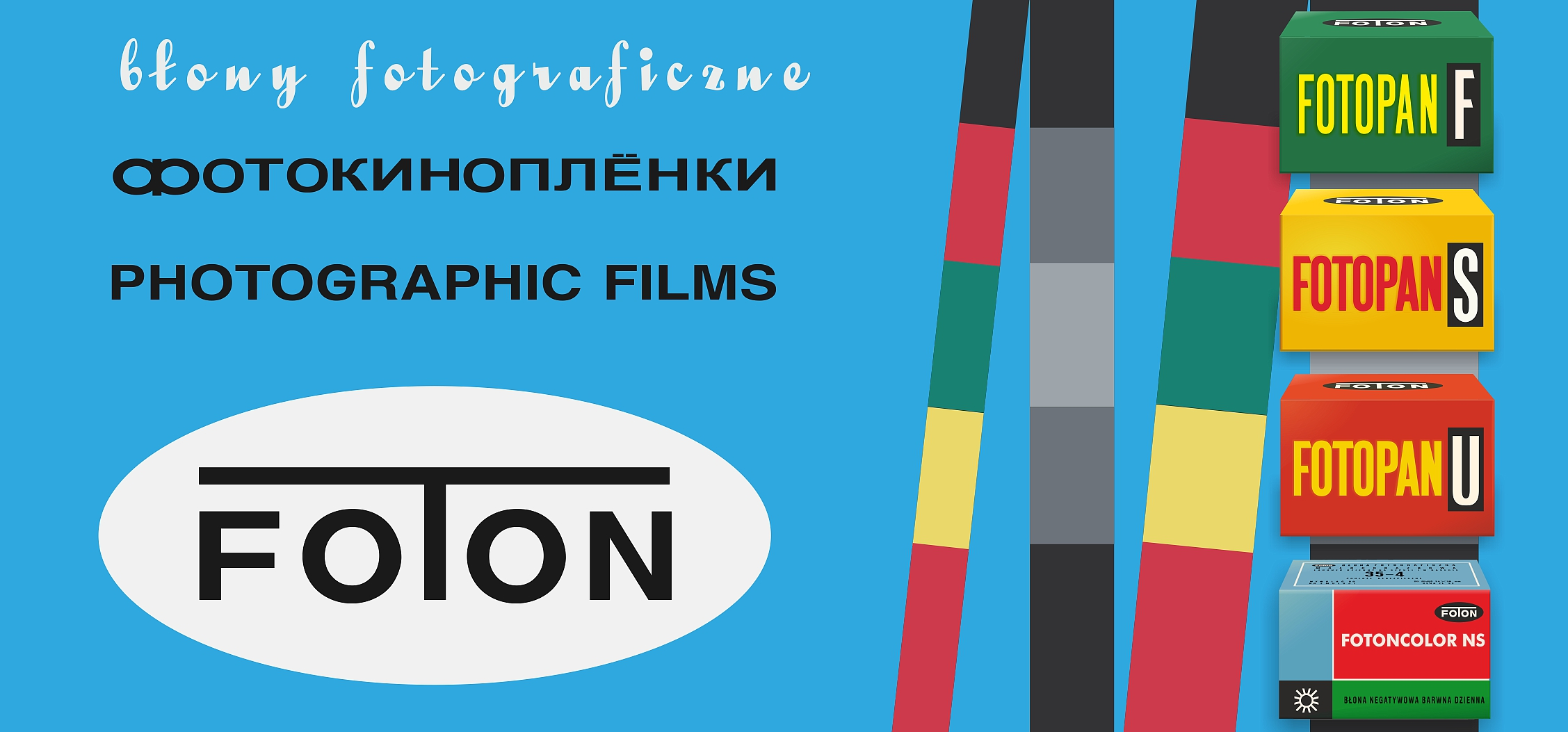
Advert for "FOTON" articles, ca 1980

== See also ==
- Bydgoszcz
- (in Polish) Warszawskie Zakłady Fotochemiczne „Foton"

== Bibliography ==
- (in Polish) Brakowski, Konrad (1973). Bez fotografii ani rusz... Kalendarz Bydgoski. Bydgoszcz: Towarzystwo Miłośników Miasta Bydgoszczy. pp. 154–158.
- (in Polish) Czyńska, Małgorzata (2018). Kobiety Fotonu. Bydgoszcz: Farbiarnia. pp. 154–158. ISBN 9788395139307.
