= Kiev 35A =

The Kiev 35A is a semi-automatic 35 mm camera made by the Soviet Kiev-Arsenal factory. A copy of the Minox 35 camera and similar to Minox 35EL; it is small and lightweight. It is sometimes compared to the LOMO LC-A camera.

The camera is notable for its unreliability, light leaks and many electronic flaws (like failure to open shutter).

== Specifications ==
- Lens: MC KORSAR 35mm f/2.8
- Focusing: scale-focus, 1m to infinity
- Aperture: f2.8 to f16
- Shutter speeds: continuously variable, 1/500s to 4s
- Flash: X-sync at 1/30s, hot shoe
- Exposure: aperture-priority semi-automatic
- Film type: 135 film
- ISO settings: 25, 50, 100, 200, 400, and 800
- Battery: four Maxell LR-43 or equivalent total 6V
- Size: 101.5x64x32.5 mm
- Weight: 180g
