= Voigtländer Brillant =

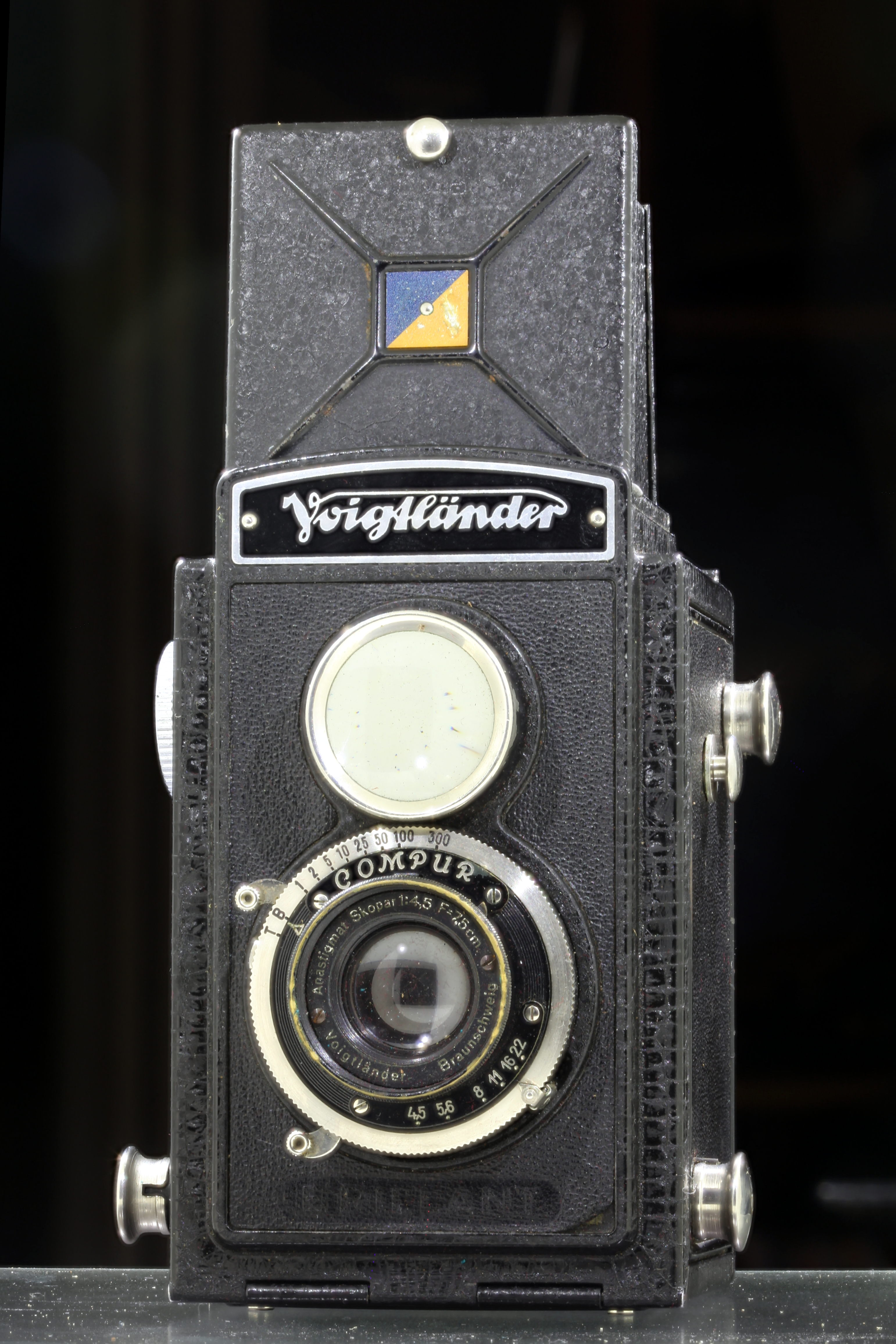

Overview
- Maker: Voigtländer
- Type: Medium format twin lens reflex camera
- Released: 1932

Sensor/medium
- Film format: 120 film

Focusing
- Focus: manual

General
- Made in: Germany

The Voigtländer Brillant is a range of pseudo-TLR cameras, and later true TLR cameras, taking 6 × 6 cm exposures on 120 film, made by Voigtländer from 1932.

Famed Hungarian-Dutch photographer Eva Besnyö used a Brillant for her early work.

== Introduction ==
The first Voigtländer Brillant was released in 1932. This early model had a metal body which resembles a TLR but it is functionally closer to a box camera, since it cannot be focused in the viewfinder. It uses 'zone-focusing' for which one has to estimate the distance to the subject. To assist this estimate, three situations are marked around the taking lens: Porträt, Gruppe and Landschaft (i. e. Portrait, Group and Landscape). While TLRs of the same period have a rather dim ground-glass viewfinder, the Brillant has a so-called brilliant finder made of plain glass.

== Brillant V6 ==
The Brillant V6 was introduced in 1937. It featured a body made of bakelite, a polymer, and introduced an accessory compartment for an exposure meter or filters. The V6 continued the three-point zone-focusing system introduced on the original Brillant in 1932. The V6 also introduced a film advancement lock and automatic frame counter on the side of the camera. This ensured even spacing of frames along the film, and allowed photographers to close a shutter over the red frame counter window for use with panchromatic films.

The Brillant V6 was offered with the following lens and shutter combinations:

- Voigtar f/7.7 with Singlo 1/75 second delayed action
- Voigtar f/6.3 with Singlo 1/75 second delayed action
- Voigtar f/4.5 with Prontor II 1/175 second delayed action
- Skopar f/4.5 with Compur 1/300 second
- Skopar f/4.5 with Compur-Rapid 1/500 second
- Voigtar f/3.5 with Compur-Rapid 1/500 second

== Focusing Brillant ==
The next major step took place in 1938, with the introduction of the Focusing Brillant. The Focusing Brillant used the same bakelite body as the V6, but featured an f2.2 focusing lens coupled to the main lens with a gear system. A small spot of opaque, ground glass was added to the brilliant finder to focus on through the focusing lens. For added precision in focusing, a small magnifying lens can be swung up from inside the finder, providing the photographer with a clear view of the ground glass patch on the finder. The Focusing Brillant also featured an optical sport finder for fast moving subjects.

The Focusing Brillant was offered with the following lens and shutter combinations:

- Voigtar f/4.5 with Compur 1/300 second
- Voigtar f/3.5 with Compur 1/300 second
- Skopar f/3.5 with Compur-Rapid 1/500 second
- Heliar f/3.5 with Compur-Rapid 1/500 second

After the introduction of this focusing model, the zone-focusing models continued to be produced.

== Focusing and controls ==
Pre-1938 models use zone focusing. This means there are three markings: Portrait, Group and Landscape, each supposing a standard distance or depth-of-field. A small table with the right distances is provided in the manual or inside the accessory-shoe holder. Different language versions were made for various markets; German, English (their name became Brilliant), Spanish, French, Italian, Polish and Czechoslovak versions have been reported. Apart from this zone-focusing, a distance scale in meters or feet and a depth-of-field scale are provided to let the photographer make an educated guess of whether the picture will be in focus. Three shutter speeds are provided; B, 1/25 and 1/50s. The aperture can be set at 9 (full aperture), 11 and 22. The latter two are selected by rotating a punched disc between the lenses.

The introduction of the Focusing Brillant added a third way of focusing: a visual focus check on a small dot of ground glass in the viewfinder.

== Variations ==
- Early models have a metal body, later models are made of bakelite. Most models have a swing door for accessories; some have a rotating accessory door.
- Aperture, lens and shutter may vary from type to type and in time.
- The Soviet camera factory GOMZ/LOMO made Komsomolets and Lubitel cameras that were clearly based on the Voigtländer Brillant.
