= CHILESCOPE =

Observatory in the Chilean Andes

CHILESCOPE OBSERVATORY
- Location: Coquimbo Region, Chile
- Coordinates: 30°28′21.0″S 70°45′47.0″W
- Altitude: 1,564 m (5,131 ft)
- Established: 2015
- Website: chilescope.com

Telescopes
- Dome 1: 39.4-inch (1 m) Ritchey-Chrétien reflector
- Unnamed: 20-inch (0.5 m) reflector
- Unnamed: 20-inch (0.5 m) reflector

CHILESCOPE is a remote observatory located in the Chilean Andes at an elevation of 1,560 meters (5,118 feet). It is located in the southern part of the Atacama Desert, some 12.5 miles (20 kilometers) southeast of Cerro Pachon (home to the Gemini South Observatory). The mountain upon which the domes are located is actually owned and shared by two observatories: Chilescope and Obstech. The staff of both observatories work closely together.

Chilescope was founded by partners Ivan Rubtzov and Sergey Pogrebissky, with the support of astronomer Yuri Beletsky of the Carnegie Institution for Science.

The nearest city with an airport is La Serena and the observatory can be reached in 2.5 hours by car. The nearest major locality is Ovalle.

== Equipment ==
- 1-meter f/8 ASA Astrosysteme Ritchey-Chrétien with dual-Nasmyth focuses designed by renowned optical engineer Philipp Keller and manufactured by LOMO. The scope resides in a 5.5-meter dome and is borne by a massive direct-drive alt-azimuth mount, also manufactured by ASA.
- pair of 20-inch (50-cm) ASA Astrosysteme f/3.8 Newtonian astrographs, each riding atop ASA DDM85 direct-drive equatorial mounts and housed in individual 4-meter domes.
- one private 4-meter dome.
- dome with retractable roof with three telescopes.

== Limitations in the observations ==
All Chilescope telescopes are limited to observing objects at 30° or more elevation. Also, the scopes will not allow you to book imaging time when the Sun is less than 15° below the horizon.

== Power and Internet ==
Due to the remote location of Chilescope, power is provided by a hybrid solar and diesel generator with 70 solar panels on the property, with diesel fuel Cummins (28 kW) only being necessary when the Sun isn't visible for a day or more, or in the event of a total power disruption. Internet is provided via a radio relay with speeds as high as 30 megabytes per second.

== See also ==
- ITelescope Observatory, another remotely controlled observatory
- List of astronomical observatories
