= Lubitel =

Soviet medium-format TLR camera

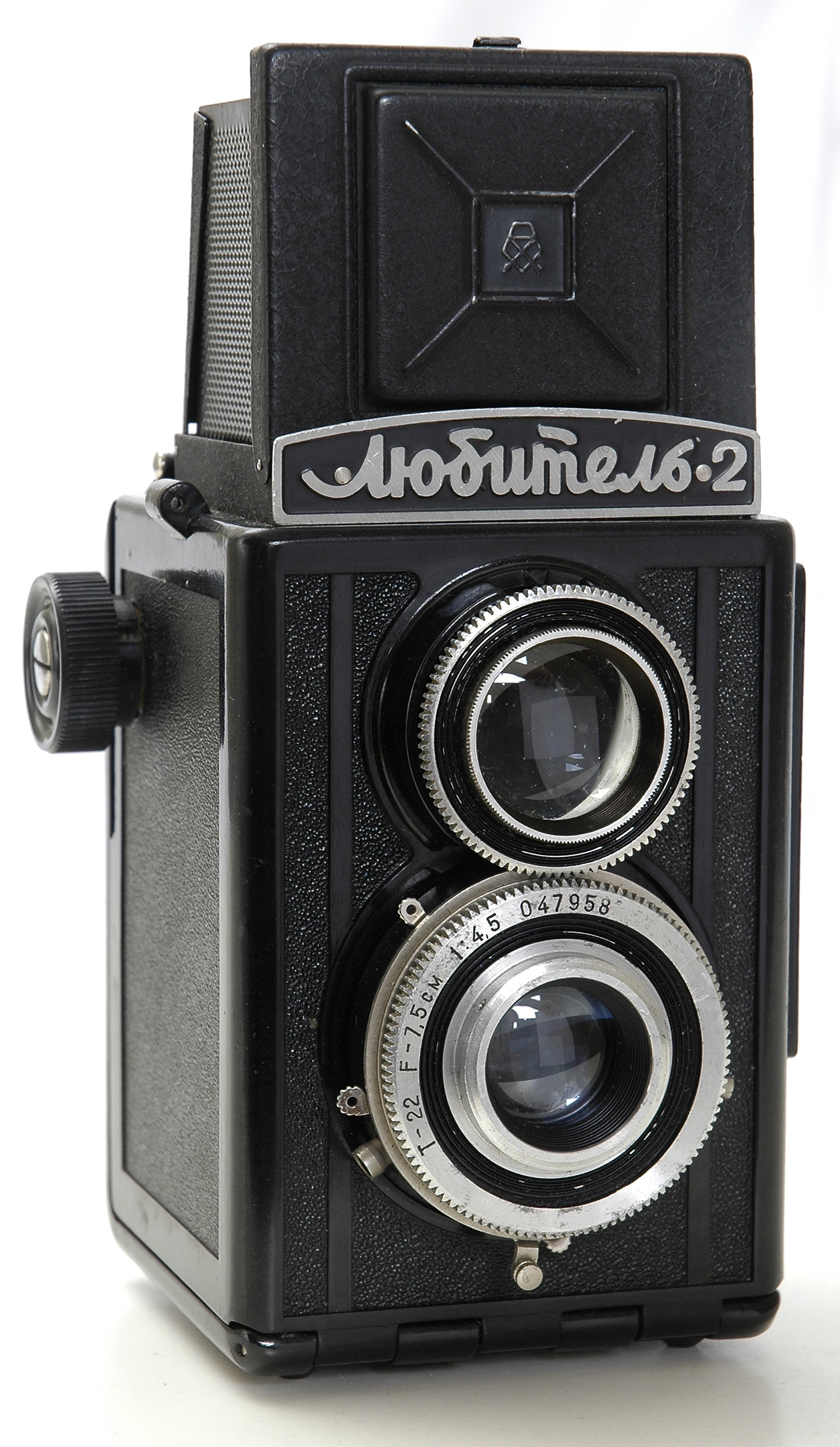
Lubitel-2

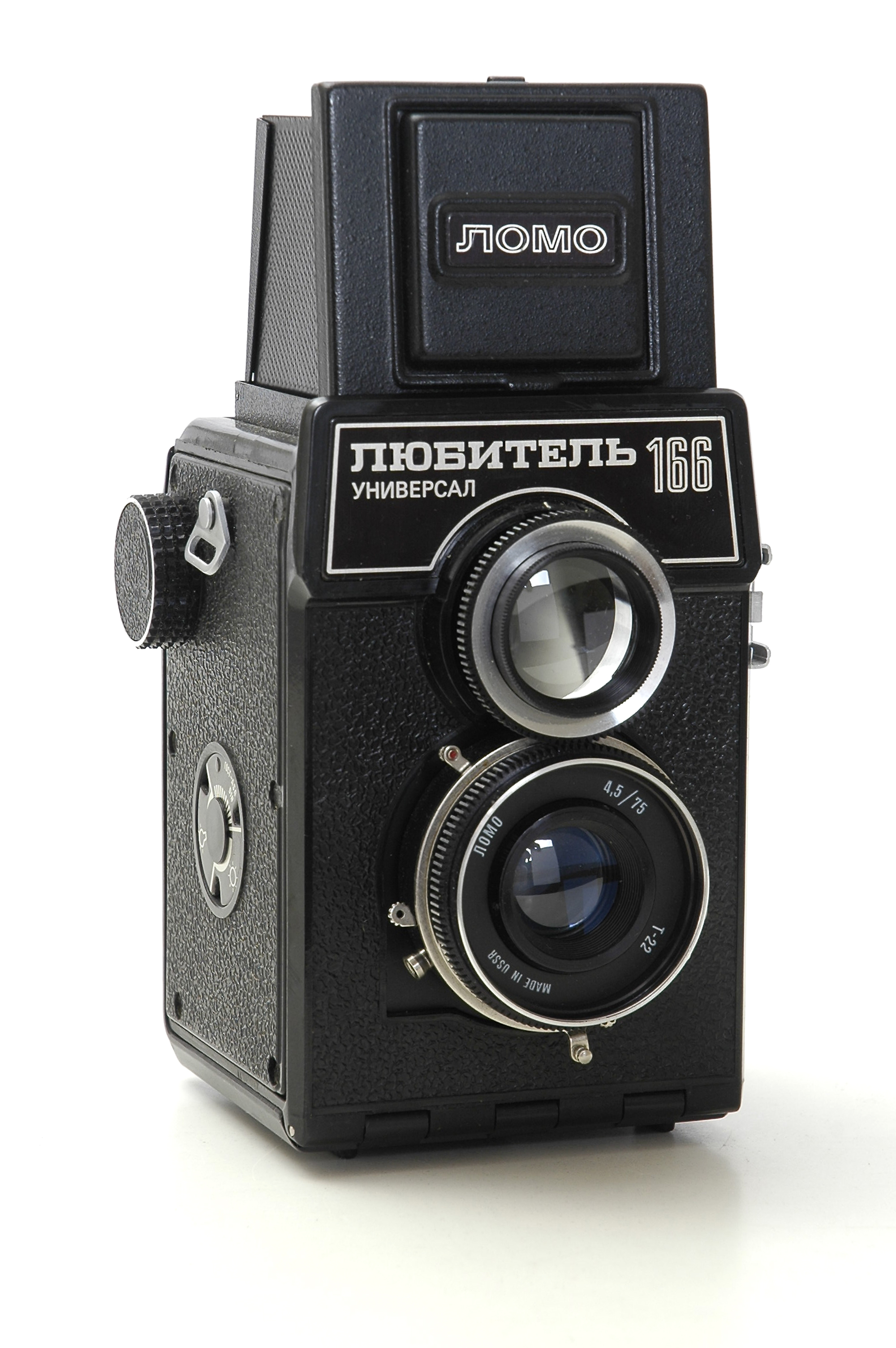
Lubitel-166 Universal

Lubitel (Russian: Любитель, romanized: Lyubitel, lit. 'amateur') refers to any of the several medium format twin-lens reflex cameras manufactured in Russia by LOMO. The design is based on the early 1930s Voigtländer Brillant camera with various improvements.

They are often considered toy cameras due to their cheap price, bakelite and later thermoplastic construction and low build quality. However, the Lubitels use 120 film, feature Cooke triplet, all-glass lenses and shutter speeds from bulb to 1/250 of a second. Aperture range is from f/4.5 to f/22. These characteristics are closer to those of an amateur TLR of the 1950s than a toy or disposable camera. They can achieve excellent results when the lens is stopped down but, as with any three-element lens, the results will be soft by today's standards at larger apertures.

Lubitel cameras are often used by art photographers or amateurs looking for a cheap introduction to medium format photography.

Models and years produced:

- The Komsomolets camera was a forerunner of the Lubitel. Unlike the Lubitel, it has a non-focusing viewfinder. It is a close copy of the Voigtländer Brillant.
- Lubitel TLR 1950-1956
- Lubitel-2 1955-1977
- Lubitel-166 1977-1980
- Lubitel-166 B 1980-?
- Lubitel-166 Universal 1984-August 1988 (production terminated)
- Lubitel-166+ 2008- (manufactured by Lomographic Society)

== See also ==
- Smena
- Holga
- Diana
- Lomography
