= Lomo, California =

Lomo, California may refer to:

- Lomo, Butte County, California
- Lomo, Sutter County, California, a place in California
