= Foma Bohemia =

Company in the Czech Republic

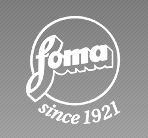
- Type: Společnost s ručením omezeným
- Industry: Photography
- Founded: 1921
- Headquarters: Hradec Králové, Czech Republic
- Products: Film, paper
- Website: https://www.foma.cz

Fomapan 100 Classic
- Maker: Foma
- Speed: 100/21°
- Type: B&W print
- Process: Gelatin-silver
- Format: 135, 120, 4×5 in, 8×10 in, 16mm, 8mm
- Application: General purpose

Fomapan 200 Creative
- Maker: Foma
- Speed: 200/24°
- Type: B&W print
- Process: Gelatin-silver
- Format: 135, 120, 4×5 in, 8×10 in
- Application: General purpose

Fomapan 400 Action
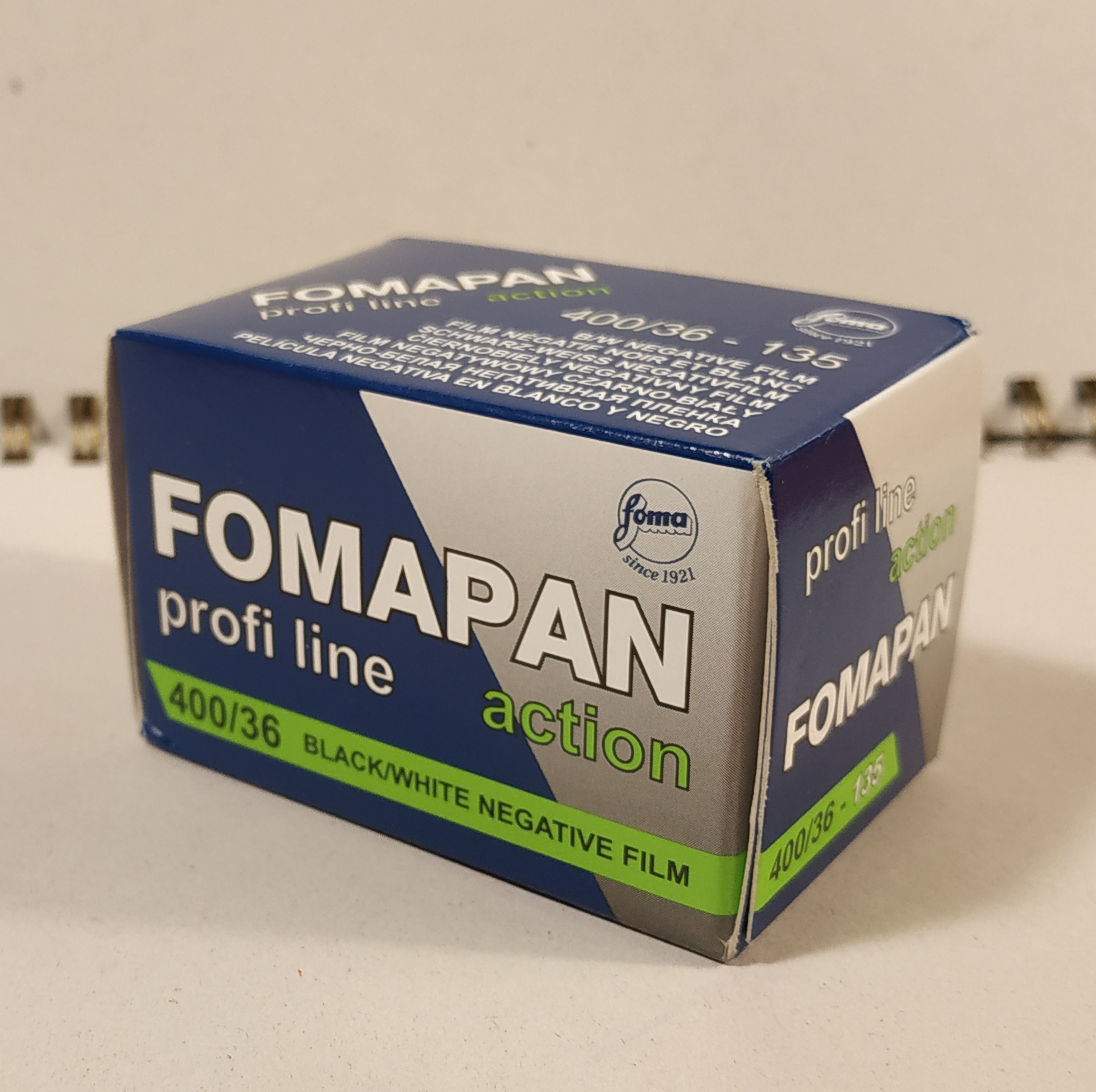
- Maker: Foma
- Speed: 400/27°
- Type: B&W print
- Process: Gelatin-silver
- Format: 135, 120, 4×5 in, 8×10 in
- Application: General purpose

Retropan 320 Soft
- Maker: Foma
- Speed: 320/26°
- Type: B&W print
- Process: Gelatin-silver
- Format: 4×5 in, 8×10 in
- Application: General purpose

Fomapan R 100
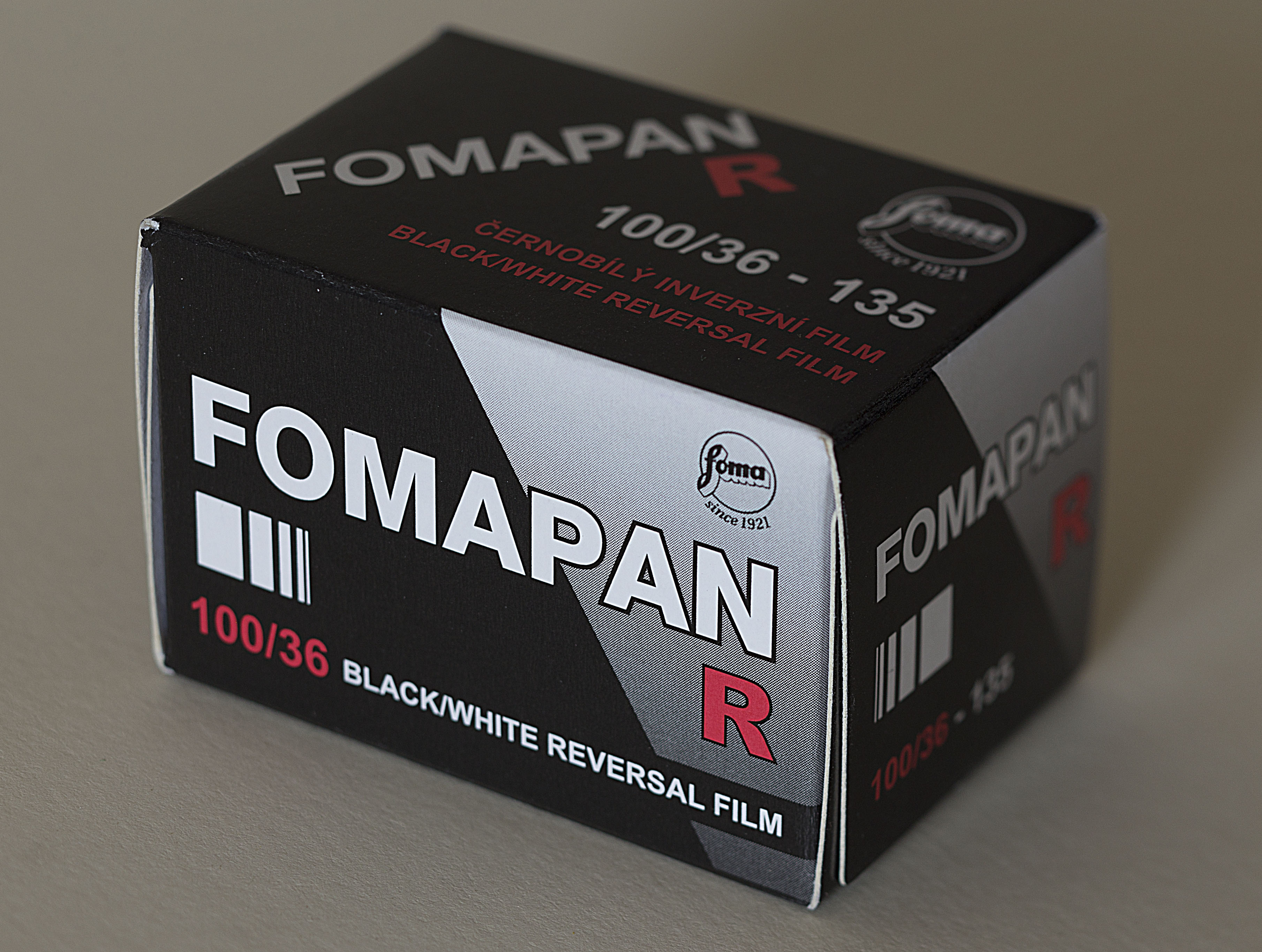
- Maker: Foma
- Speed: 100/21°
- Type: B&W slide
- Process: Gelatin-silver
- Format: 135, 16mm, 8mm
- Application: General purpose

Foma Bohemia is a photographic private limited company based in Hradec Králové, Czech Republic. It was established in 1921, originally as Fotochema, being renamed in 1995 on privatisation. They are mostly known for their line of black and white films and papers but also produce movie film, X-ray films for medicine and industry and personal dosimetry film along with processing chemicals. They formerly produced aerial and surveillance films.

== History ==
In 1919, engineers Evžen Schier and J. Bárta founded a company in Prague-Nusle for the production of photographic plates, sold under the brand name Ibis. In 1921, the company moved to Hradec Králové and changed its name to Fotochema.

Initially, production in 1921 was focused on photographic plates and processing chemicals. In 1931, production of black and white papers started, and in 1933 the production of roll films. Since 1949, the product range has been extended by X-ray films for medical uses (MEDIX) and X-ray materials for non-destructive defectoscopy. In the 1950s new products included graphic films for the printing industry, black and white cinematographic positive films and 35mm (135 format) perforated films.

In 1958, the company introduced the production of high-quality Fomacolor colour papers and in 1964 colour negative films and in 1971 the production of Fomachrom colour reversal (slide) film. Continuous research and development led to the improvement of existing products and their further expansion, such as reprographic materials, special film for aerial photography, etc. Industrial X-ray materials (INDUX) were added in 1988.

After 1990, the company focussed on black and white photographic materials (films, papers, chemicals) and X-ray films MEDIX and INDUX including processing photochemical baths.

In 1995 the state-owned company Fotochema was privatised establishing Foma Bohemia Ltd (S.R.O.). In 1997 Foma achieved ISO 9001 quality assurance.

== Black and white films ==
- Fomapan 100 Classic ISO 100 General purpose panchromatic fine grain film of traditional style. Formats: 135 (triacetate base), 120, Sheet film (polyester base).
- Fomapan 200 Creative (Revised 2015 on) ISO 200 Modern general purpose panchromatic film using both hexagonal core and shell tabular 'T' grains. Formats: 135 (triacetate base), 120, Sheet film (polyester base).
- Fomapan 400 Action (In Production) ISO 400 General purpose traditional panchromatic film. Formats: 135 (triacetate base), 120, Sheet film (polyester base).
- Retropan 320 Soft Retro 1950s style traditional panchromatic film characterised by low contrast images with a wide range of half tones which makes it suitable for contact printing or "retro" style enlarging of negatives particularly for portraits, still life, architecture, experiments, landscapes. Formats: 135 (triacetate base), Sheet film (polyester base).
- Ortho 400 Fine grained, high speed orthochromatic film. Formats: 135 (triacetate base), 120, Sheet film (polyester base).
- Fomapan R 100 B&W reversal film, intended for B&W motion picture movie making (Cine film) and also converted for still camera use. Processing available through limited number of commercial processors or using Foma Direct Reversal Kit. Polyester base: 8mm, 16mm and 135.

All films are also available as 35mm bulk rolls in lengths of 17 m (Fomapan 100, 200, 400), 30.5 m (Fomapan 100, 200, 400, R 100, Retropan 320, Ortho 400), and 50 m (Fomapan 100, 200, 400).

== Photographic paper ==
- Fomabrom - Fibre Based (FB) (Baryta) Graded papers in Normal (N) or Hard/contrast (C) grades. Neutral to medium warm tone. Numbered; 111 Gloss, 112 Matte, 115 Velvet.
- Fomabrom Variant III - Fibre Based (FB) (Baryta) Variable Contrast papers. Neutral to medium warm tone. Numbered; 111 Gloss, 112 Matte.
- Fomaspeed - Resin Coated (RC) Graded papers in Normal (N) and Hard/contrast (C) grades. Neutral to medium warm tone. Numbered; 311 Gloss, 312 Matte, 313 Velvet.
- Fomaspeed Variant III - Resin Coated (RC) Variable Contrast papers. Neutral to medium warm tone. Numbered; 311 Gloss, 312 Matte, 313 Velvet.
- Formatone MG Classic - Fibre Based (FB) (Baryta) Variable Contrast, Warm tone papers. Numbered; 131 Gloss, 132 Matte, 133 Velvet,
- Formatone MG Classic - Natural paper base, Variable Contrast, Warm tone papers. Numbered; 532-II Nature and 542-II Chamois
- Retrobrom - Fibre Based (FB) (Baryta) Graded paper in Special (Sp) grade. Warm green-brown tone suitable for retro-style prints. Numbered; 151 Gloss, 152 Matte. Launched in 2019.
- Fomapastel - Fibre based (FB) (Baryta) Variable Contrast, semi-glossy with pastel colored bases. Numbered; 101 Yellow, 171 Red, 151 Green, 161 Blue, 181 Cyan, 191 Magenta.

== Black and white photographic chemicals ==
The company produce a range of photographic developers for film and paper development.

Film and paper developers

- Foma Universal Developer – Normal working developer for film or paper

Film developers

- Fomadon Excel – Alkaline developer in powder form similar to Kodak Xtol
- Fomadon LQN – Normal fine grain developer - liquid concentrate
- Fomadon LQR – Higher contrast PQ developer - liquid concentrate
- Fomadon P – Metol-hydroquinone D76d powder developer (D76d has a higher proportion of borax compared to D76 which increases the buffering capacity)
- Fomadon R09 – Liquid developer to Rodinal formula

Paper developers

- Formatol LQN Developer – Liquid concentrate to prepare normal-working developer.
- Formatol P – Normal working paper developer providing a neutral black image tone in powder form.
- Formatol H – Normal working paper developer in powder form.
- Formatol PW – Powder developer with a warm image tone, for FOMATONE photographic papers

Other chemicals

- Fomafix – Standard liquid concentrate fixer
- Fomafix P – Two component powder acid fixer
- Fomacitro – Stop bath
- Fotonal – Wetting agent
- Formatoner Indigo – indigo toner
- Formatoner Sepia – sepia toner

== See also ==
- List of photographic films
- List of discontinued photographic films
