= Lomography =

Genre of photography

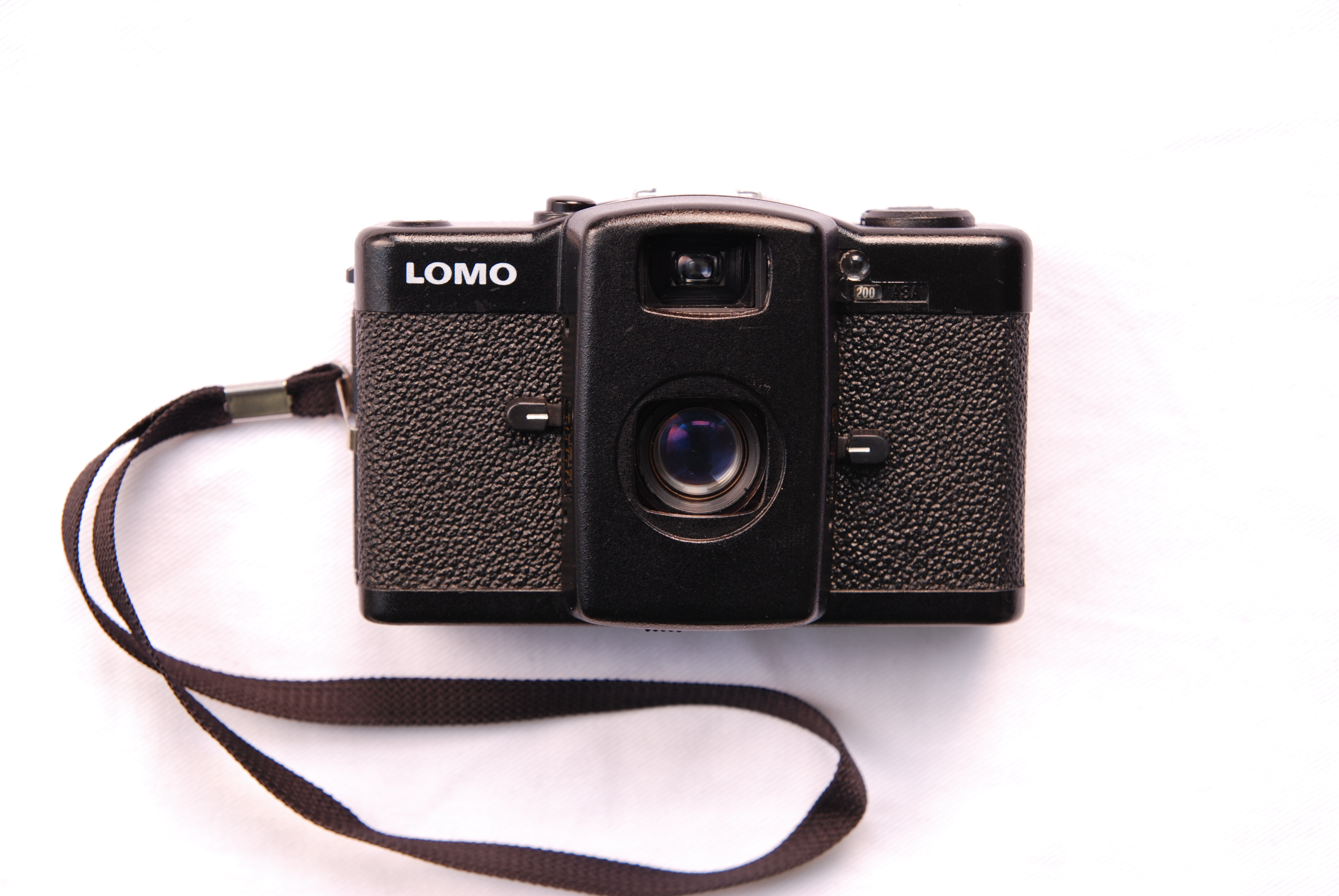
The original Lomo LC-A, which inspired the movement

Lomography, or simply lomo, is a photographic style which involves taking spontaneous photographs with minimal attention to technical details. Lomographic images often exploit the unpredictable, non-standard optical traits of toy cameras (such as light leaks and irregular lens alignment), and non-standard film processing techniques for aesthetic effect. Similar-looking techniques with digital photography, often involving "lomo" image filters in post-processing, may also be considered lomographic.

"Lomography" is claimed as a commercial trademark by Lomographische GmbH. However, it has become a genericised trademark; most camera phone photo editor apps include a "lomo" filter.

== History ==
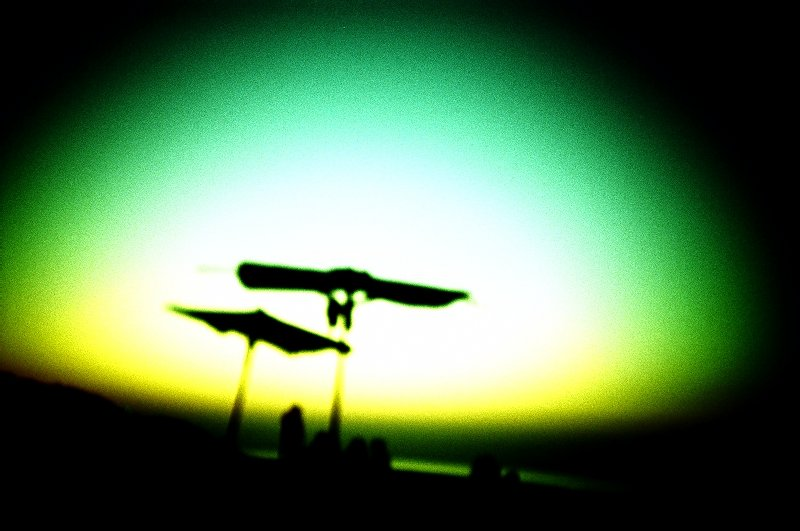
Sample shot from a LOMO LC-A

While cheap plastic toy cameras using film often used in lomography were and are produced by multiple manufacturers, Lomography is named after the Soviet-era cameras produced by Leningradskoye Optiko-Mekhanicheskoye Obyedinenie. Formerly a state-run optics manufacturer, LOMO privatised following the dissolution of the Soviet Union and became LOMO PLC. The company created and produced the 35 mm LOMO LC-A Compact Automat camera, now central to the lomography movement. This camera was loosely based upon the Cosina CX-1 introduced in the early 1980s. The LOMO LC-A produces "unique, colorful, and sometimes blurry" images.

Lomography has been a highly social pursuit since 1992, with local and international events organised by Lomographische GmbH. Lomographische, doing business as Lomography, is also a commercial company selling analogue cameras, films and accessories. The company continues to promote the Lomographic style; however, it is not necessary to use the company's products to take lomographic photos.

== Company ==
Lomographische GmbH, doing business as Lomography, is a commercial company headquartered in Vienna, Austria, which sells cameras, accessories, and film. It hosts local and international events through its non-profit division, the Lomographic Society International. The company is the namesake of the lomography genre of experimental photography.

The Lomographic Society International was founded in 1992 by a group of Viennese students interested in the LC-A. Lomography started as an art movement through which the students put on exhibitions of photos; the art movement then developed into the Lomographische AG, a commercial enterprise.

Lomography signed an exclusive distribution agreement with LOMO PLC in 1995—becoming the sole distributor of all LOMO LC-A cameras outside of the former Soviet Union. The new company reached an agreement with the deputy mayor of St Petersburg, the future Russian Prime Minister and President, Vladimir Putin, to receive a tax break in order to keep the LOMO factory in the city open.

Since the introduction of the original LOMO LC-A, Lomography has produced a line of their own film cameras. In 2005, production of the original LOMO LC-A was discontinued. Its replacement, the LOMO LC-A+, was introduced in 2006. The new camera, made in China rather than Russia, featured the original Russian lens manufactured by LOMO PLC. This changed as of mid-2007 with the lens now made in China as well. In 2012 the LC-A+ camera was re-released as a special edition. It costs ten times the original secondhand value of the old LOMO LC-A.

The Lomographic Society International (Lomography) has moved on to produce their own range of analogue cameras, films and accessories. Lomography has also released products catered to digital devices, such as the Smartphone Film Scanner; and several lenses such as the Daguerreotype Achromat lens collection for analogue and digital SLR cameras with Canon EF, Nikon F or Pentax K mounts, inspired by 19th century Daguerreotype photography. In 2013, together with Zenit, Lomography produced a new version of the Petzval Lens designed to work with Canon EF and Nikon F mount SLR cameras.

Some have questioned the pricing of Lomography's plastic "toy" cameras, which run from US$100 to $400.

=== Models ===
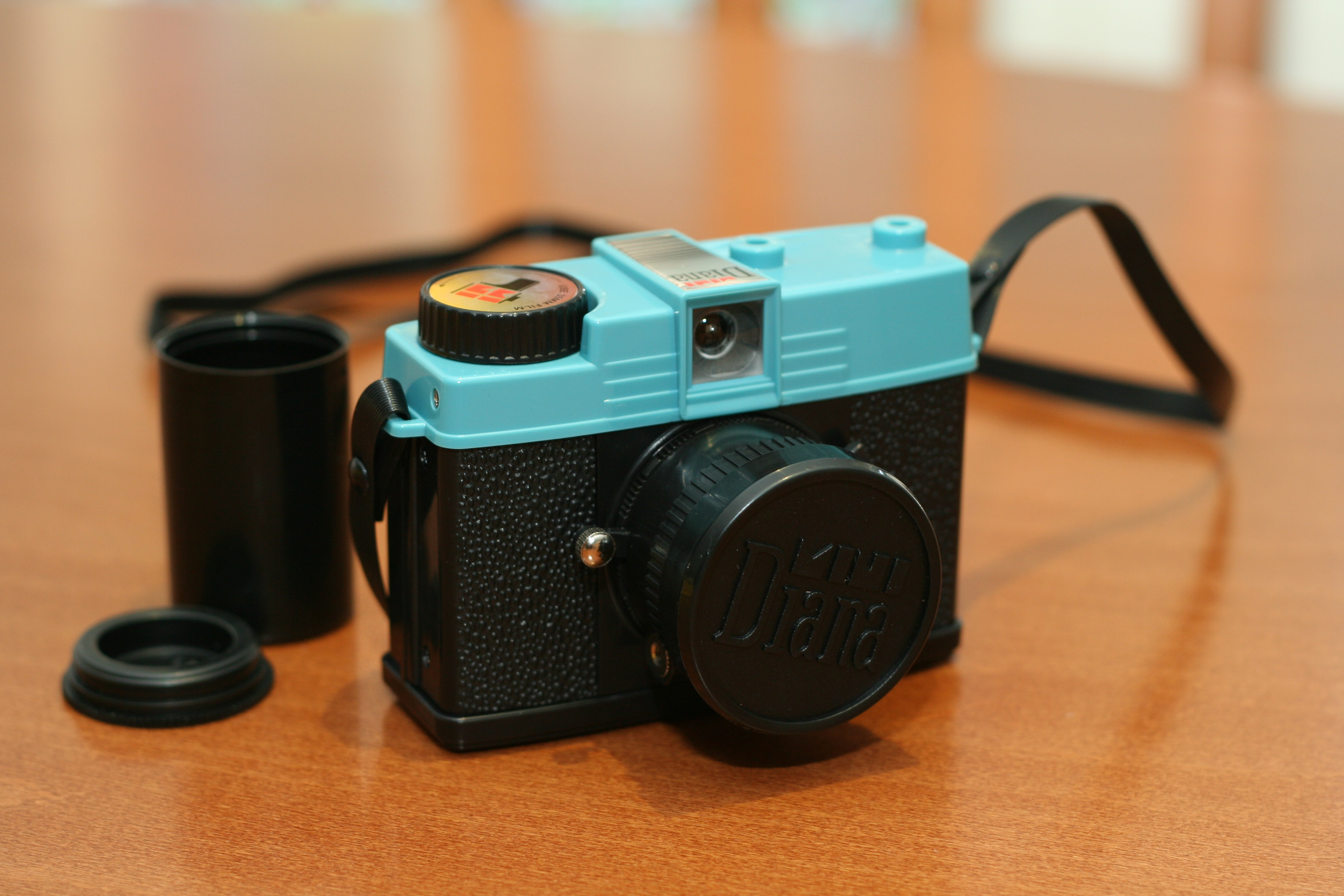
A Diana Mini

Cameras that have been marketed by Lomography:

- LOMO LC-A+
- LC-A 120
- Lomo LC-Wide
- Diana F+
- Diana Mini – a 35 mm version of the Diana F+
- Diana Baby – a 110 format version of the Diana F+
- Diana Multi Pinhole Operator
- Diana Instant Square
- Spinner 360° – a 360° panoramic camera
- Sprocket Rocket
- ActionSampler – a four-lensed miniature 35 mm camera
- Pop-9
- Oktomat
- Fisheye One
- Fisheye No.2
- Fisheye Baby – a 110 format version of the Fisheye No.2
- Colorsplash
- Colorsplash Flash
- SuperSampler

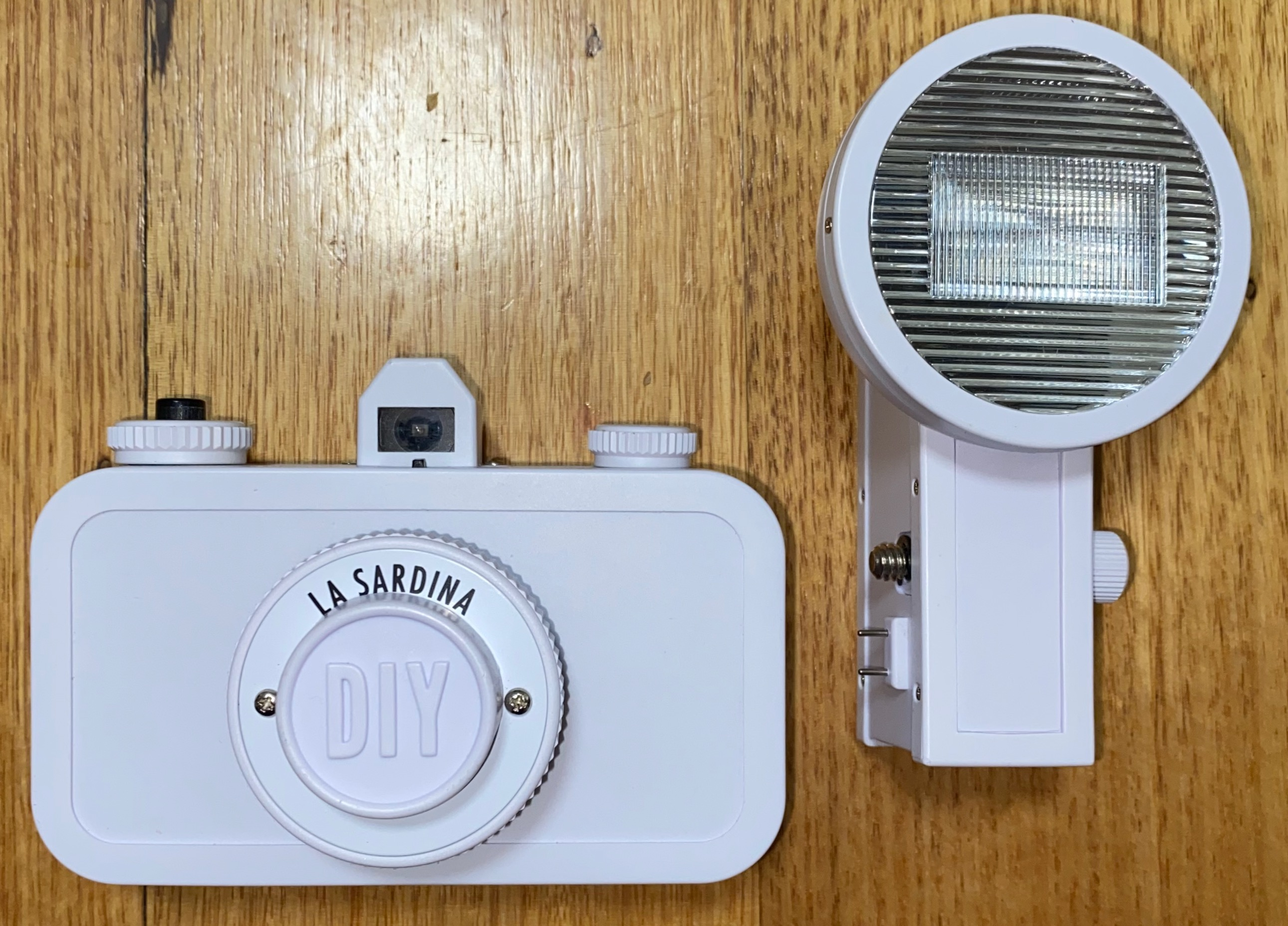
A white La Sardina camera with compatible Fritz the Blitz flash that screws in to the side of the camera

- La Sardina
- Fritz the Blitz Flash
- LomoKino – a 35 mm analog movie camera
- Konstruktor – a build-it-yourself 35 mm SLR camera
- HydroChrome Sutton's Panoramic Belair Camera
- LomoMod No.1 – a flat-packed DIY cardboard medium format camera
- LomoApparat
- Lomo'Instant
- Lomo'Instant Automat
- Lomo'Instant Automat Glass
- Lomo'Instant Wide
- Lomomatic 110 – a new 110 format camera with a glass lens

=== Film ===
The company produces 35 mm, 120 and 110 film in color negative, black and white as well as redscale. Lomography also produces its own range of experimental color-shifting film called LomoChrome.

=== Photo gallery ===
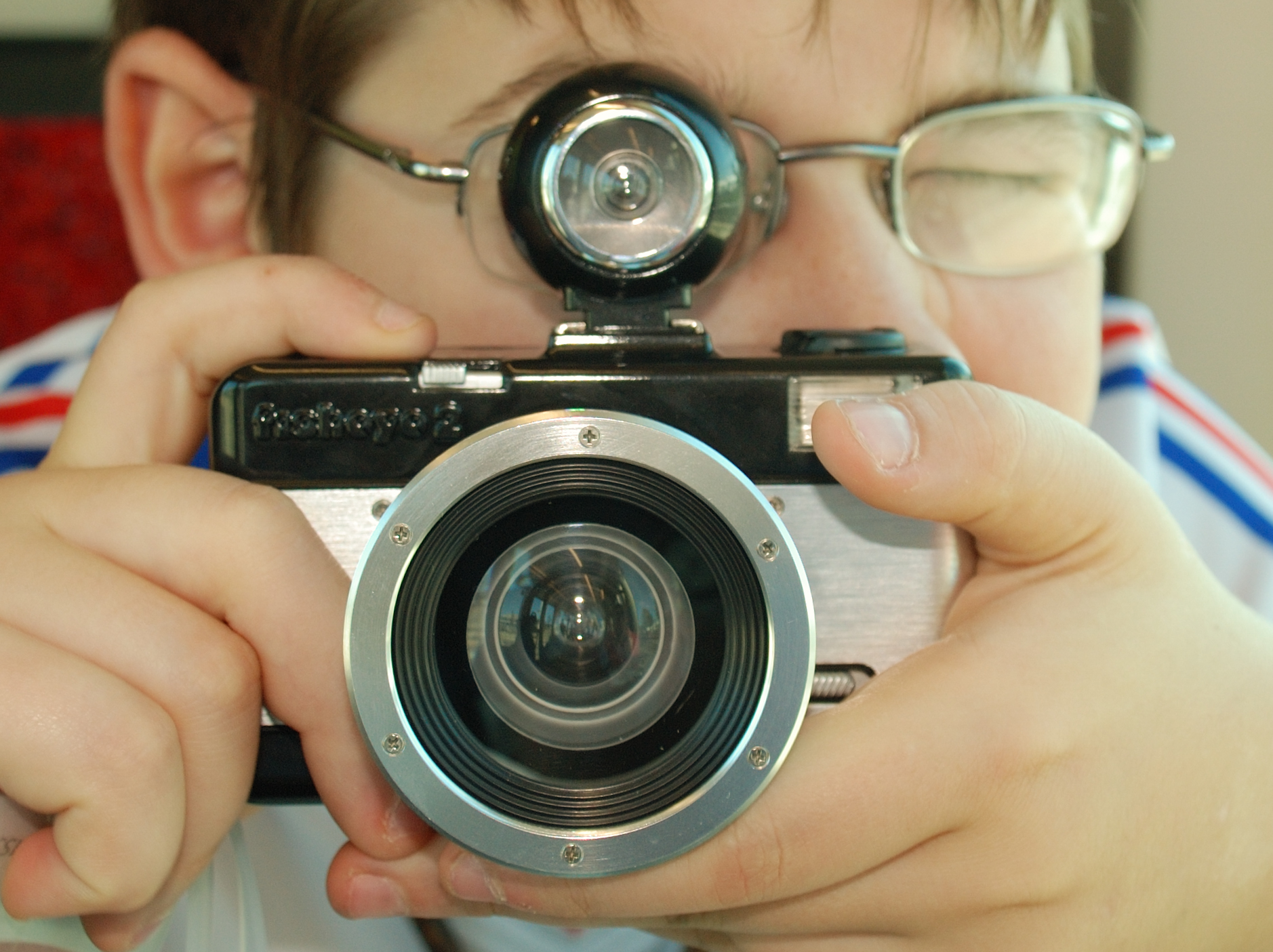
A Fisheye 2 with a fisheye viewfinder

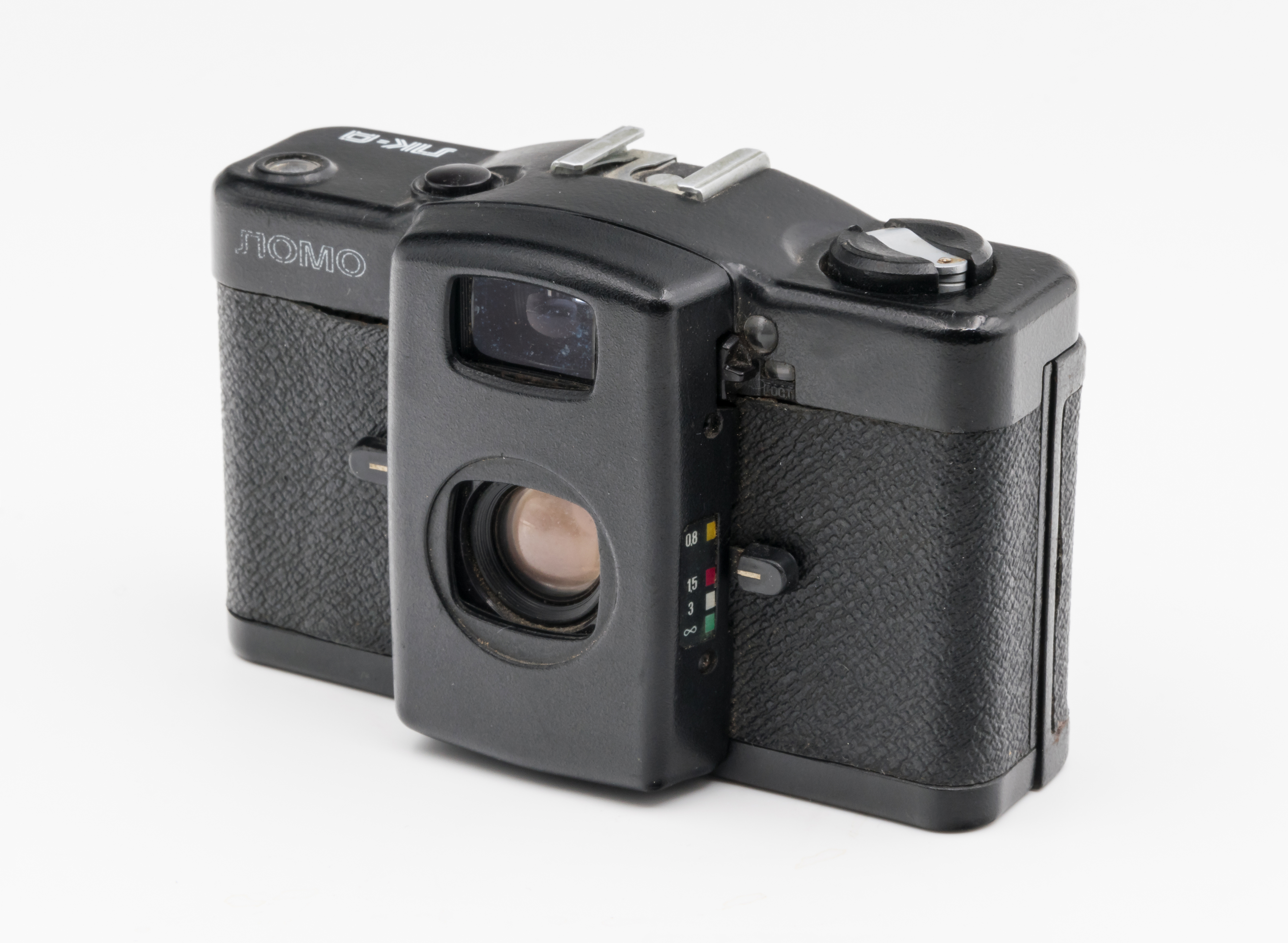
A 1988 LOMO LC-A camera

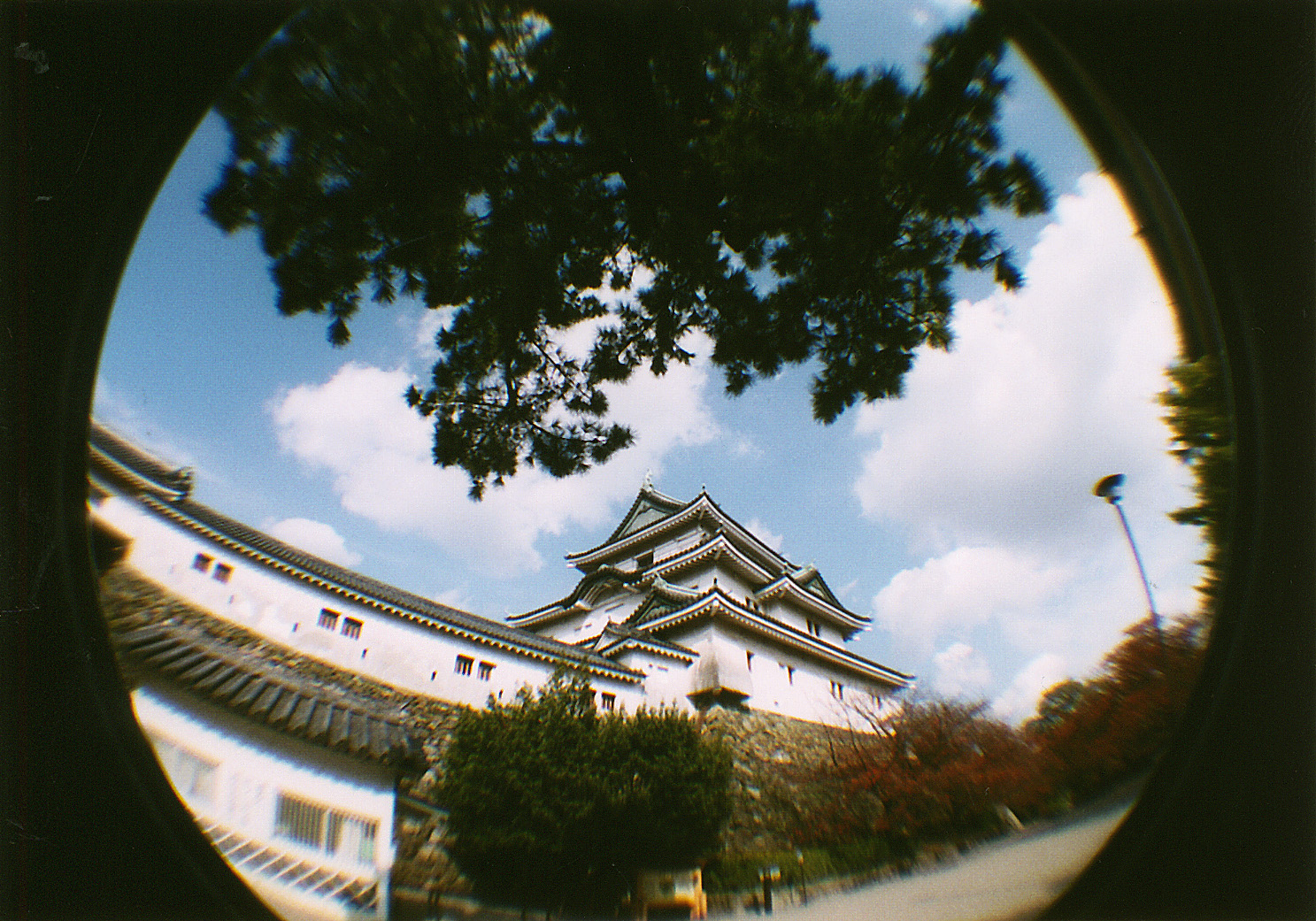
Fisheye-lens photo of Wakayama Castle

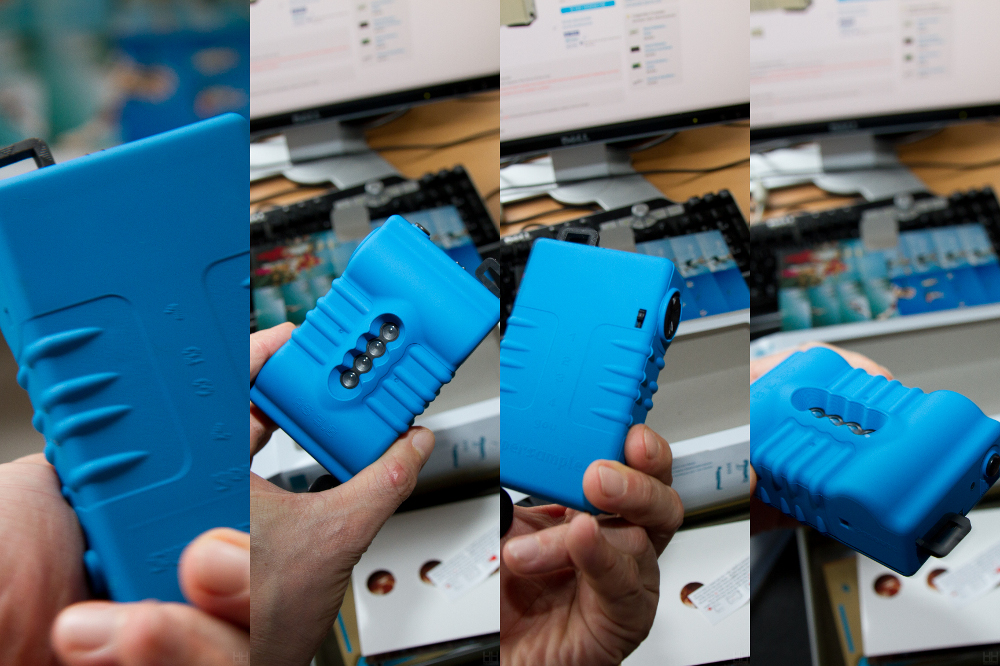
Lomography Supersampler

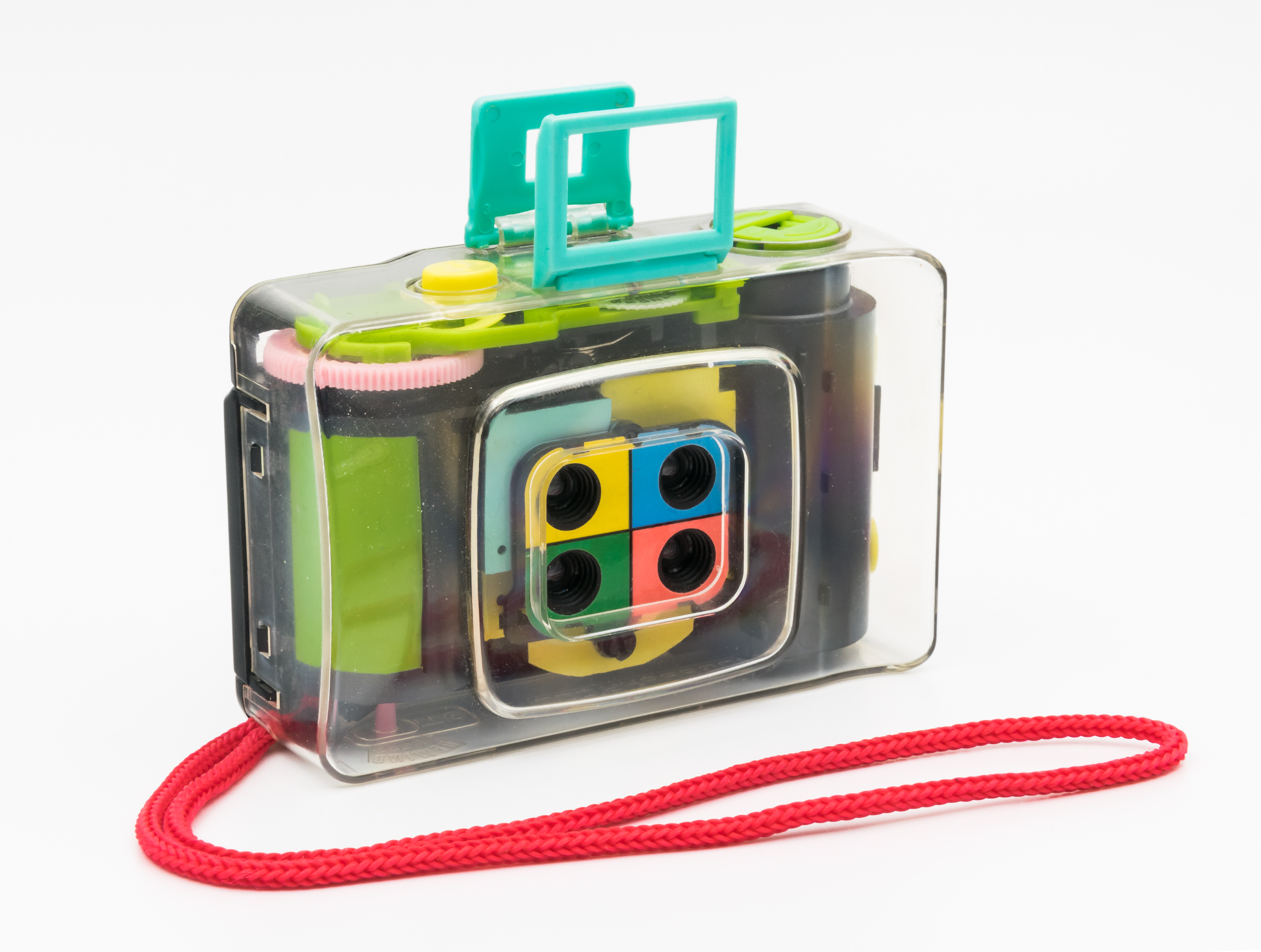
Lomography Action Sampler

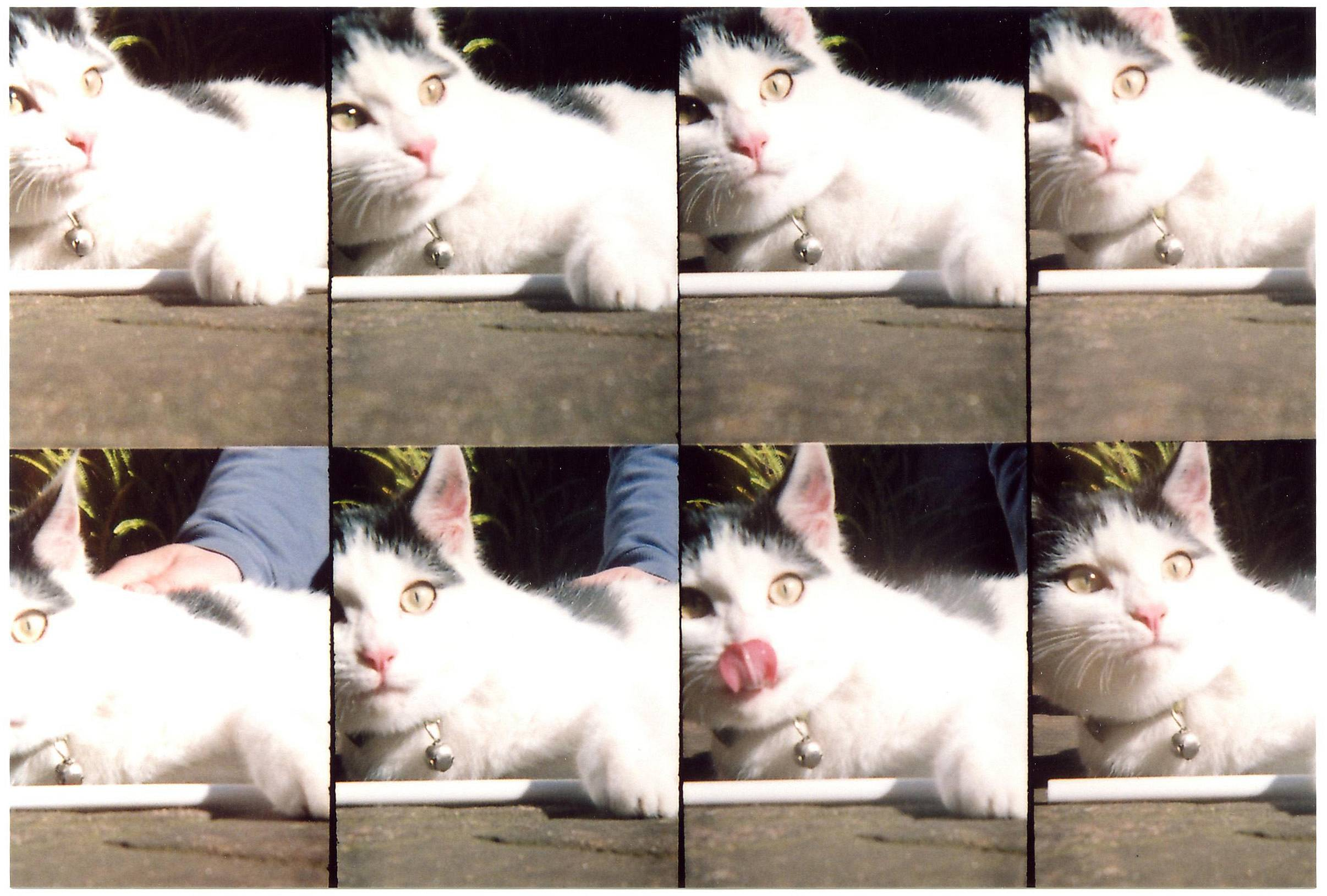
Photo taken with a Lomography Oktomat with 8 sequentially-firing shutters

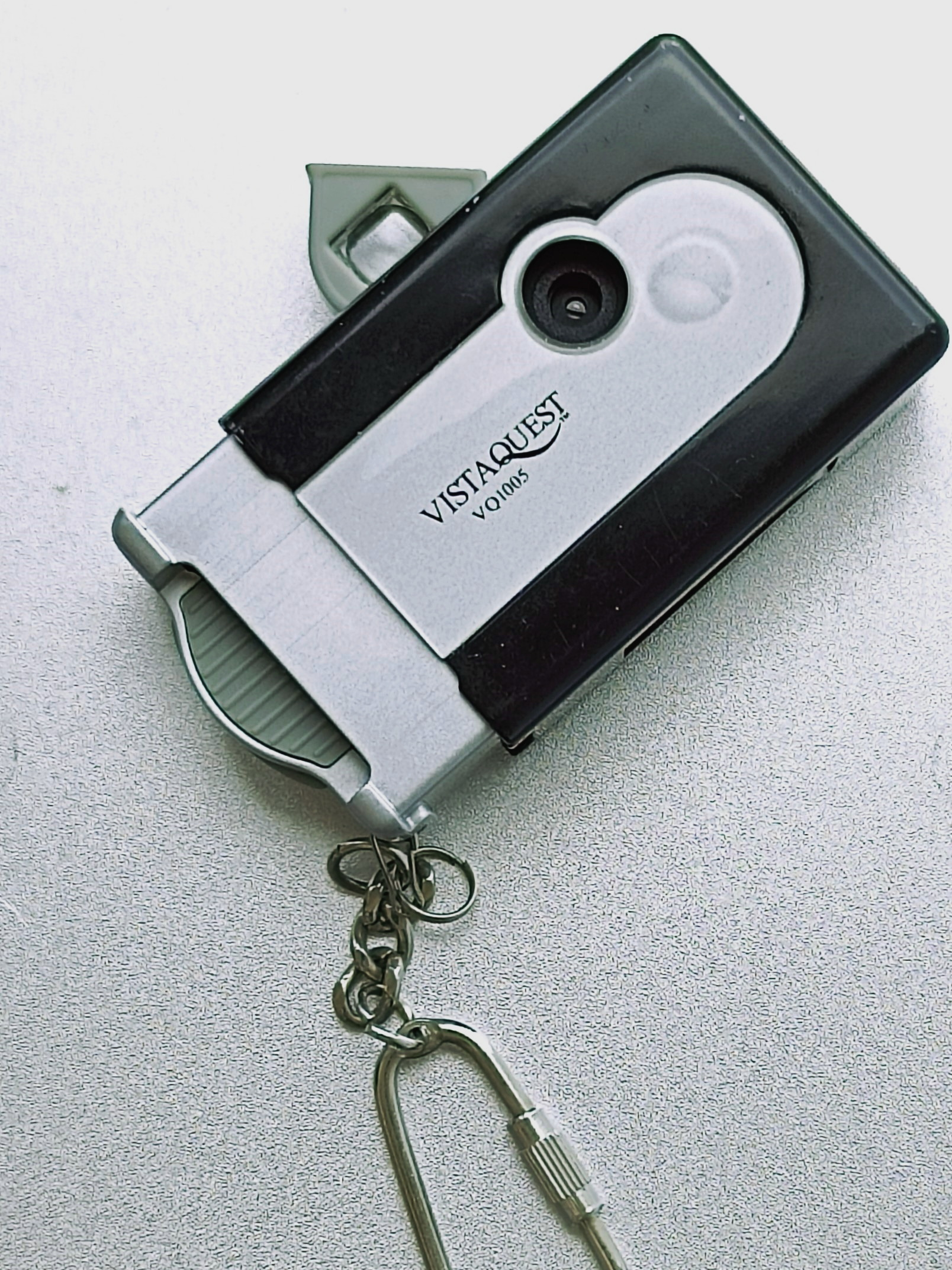
A VistaQuest VQ1005 1.3 MegaPixel digital keychain camera

== See also ==
- Lo-fi photography
