= LOMO =

Russian optical manufacturer

- Native name: ЛОМО
- Industry: Imaging, Medical
- Founded: Petrograd, Russia (1914)
- Headquarters: St. Petersburg, Russia
- Products: Lenses, medical equipment, consumer still and movie cameras, lenses, professional sound recorders for motion-picture production
- Revenue: $56.1 million (2017)
- Operating income: $8.82 million (2017)
- Net income: −$5.82 million (2017)
- Total assets: $237 million (2017)
- Total equity: $26.2 million (2017)
- Website: lomo.ru/english www.lomoplc.com

LOMO (Russian: Ленинградское Oптико-Mеханическое Oбъединение, romanized: Leningradskoye Optiko-Mekhanicheskoye Obyedinenie, lit. 'Leningrad Optical Mechanical Association') is a manufacturer of medical and motion-picture lenses and equipment based in St. Petersburg, Russia. The company was awarded three Order of Lenin decorations by the Soviet Union.

Its Lomo LC-A consumer camera was the inspiration for the lomography photographic movement.

== History ==
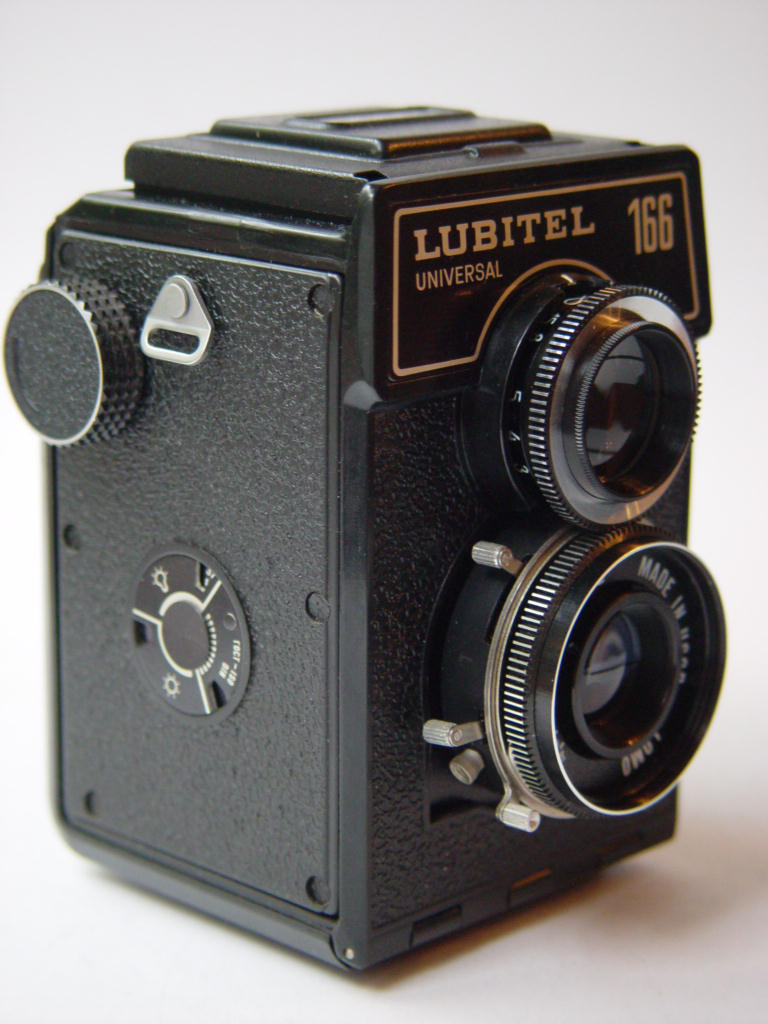
Lubitel 166 Universal twin-lens reflex 120 still camera

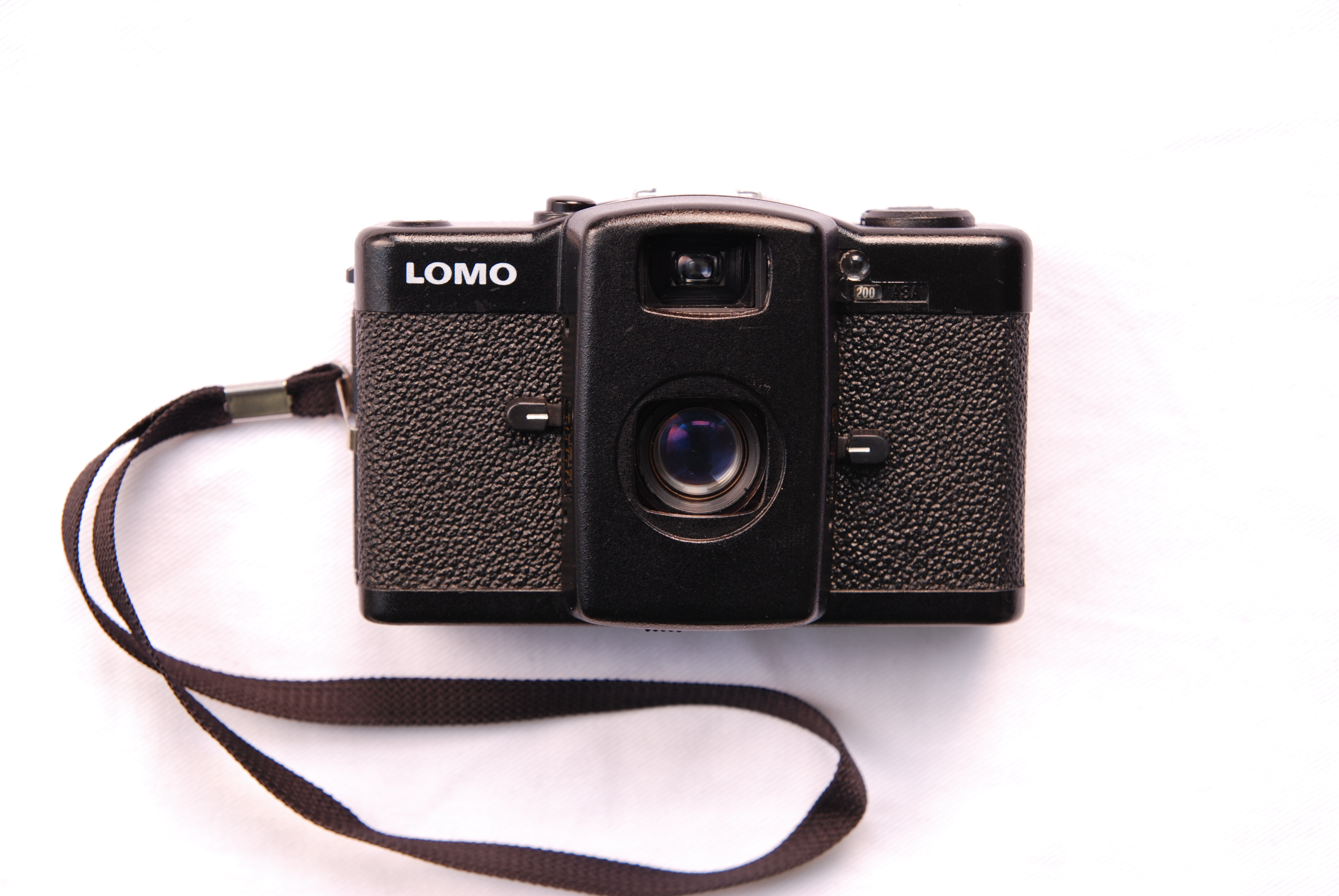
LOMO LC-A

The company was founded in 1914 in Petrograd (now Saint Petersburg). It was established as a French – Russian limited company to produce lenses and cameras. It manufactured gun sights during World War I. In 1919, it was nationalised. In 1921, the factory was named the Factory of State Optics, G.O.Z. In 1925, camera production was resumed, and several lens designs tested between 1925 and 1929. Further reorganisations of the Soviet optical factories in several stages finally resulted in that the factory at Leningrad became GOMZ, the Russian Optical and Mechanical Factory.

In the transition period 1932 to 1935 a copy of the Leica camera was developed, the VOOMP I. Today LOMO makes military optics, scientific research instruments, criminological microscopes, medical equipment, and a range of consumer products.

Known as GOMZ (State Optical-Mechanical Plant), the company was transformed under the direction of Mikhail Panfilov, who united several industries and founded the LOMO Association in 1962. Between 1990 and 1997, Ilya Klebanov was the Director General of LOMO.

The company went public in 1993, and was renamed LOMO PLC; it is traded on the RTS Classic Stock Market. The company is ISO 9001 certified and exports worldwide. Night-vision devices and telescopes account for 30% of the company's exports. Germany is the largest importer of LOMO products. Medical equipment, fiber optic cables and endoscopes, optical components and cameras are consumed mainly by the Russian market and other states of the former Soviet Union. Military equipment and science research instruments make a significant share of production for export to such countries as Israel, India, United States, Canada, Mexico, and other international markets.

In May 2024 Russian Ministry of Industry and Trade transferred control over the company to Kalashnikov Concern.

While LOMO has withdrawn from the photography industry, it has a license in a Austrian company, Lomographische AG.They continue to operate an international community platform alongside a physical gallery and retail stores in cities worldwide, including New York, Tokyo, Paris, Berlin, Hong Kong, and Vienna.
