= Lomo LC-A =

Camera model

LOMO LC-A
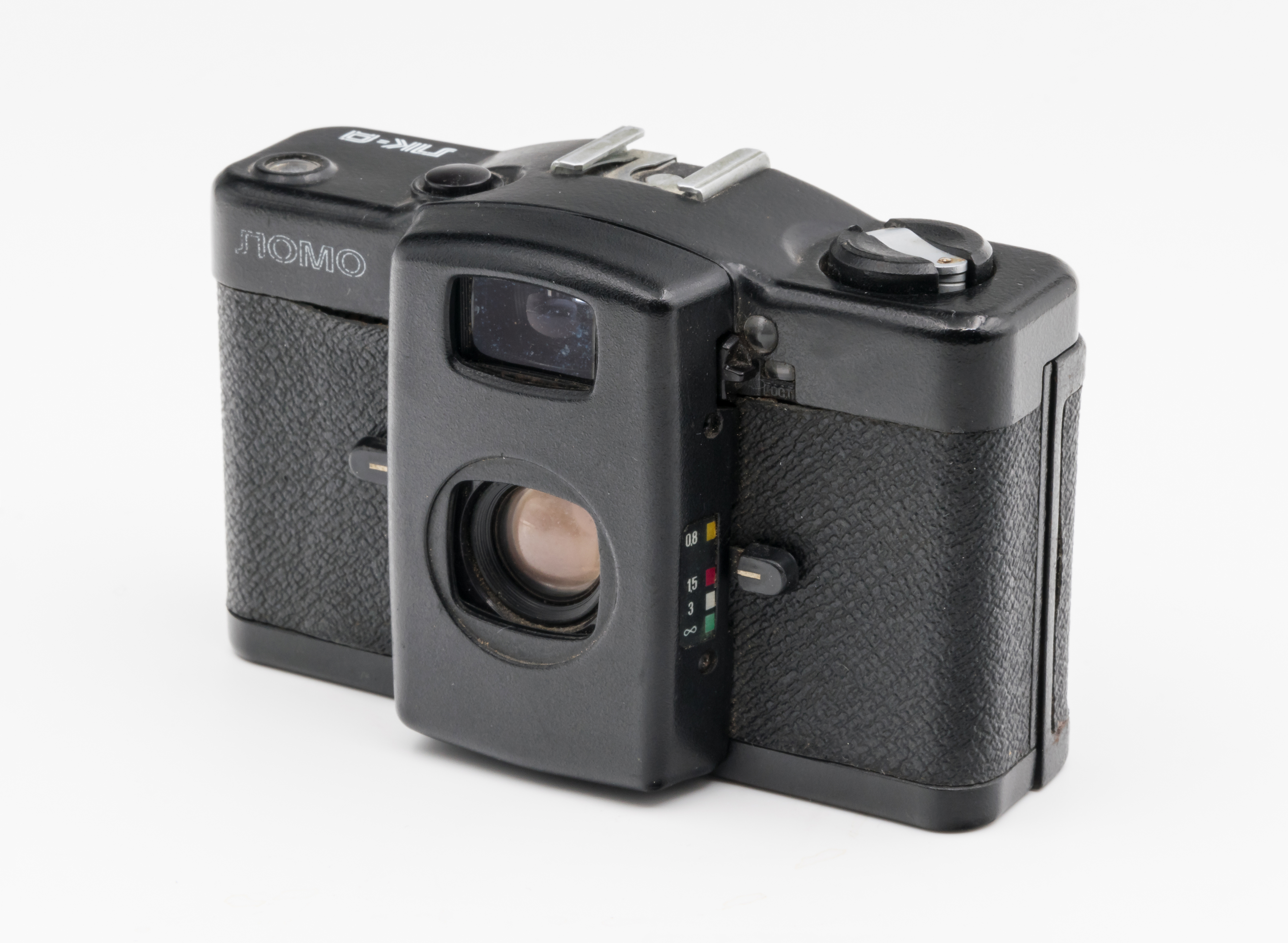
- LOMO LC-A camera

Overview
- Maker: LOMO
- Type: Compact, point and shoot
- Released: 1984

Lens
- Lens: Fixed, Minitar 1 32mm f/2.8

Sensor/medium
- Film format: 35mm (135)
- Film size: 36mm x 24mm
- Film speed: 25-400
- Film advance: Manual
- Film rewind: Manual

Focusing
- Focus modes: Manual, zone focus (0.8m, 1.5m, 3m, $\infty$)

Exposure/metering
- Exposure modes: Programmed auto, manual with fixed shutter speed
- Exposure metering: Cadmium Sulphide (CdS light meter

Flash
- Flash: Hot shoe only
- Flash synchronization: 1/60s; rear sync. only

Shutter
- Shutter: Electronically controlled
- Shutter speed range: 2m to 1/500s

General
- Battery: Three S76
- Dimensions: 107×68×43.5 mm (4.21×2.68×1.71 in)
- Weight: 250 g (9 oz)

The LOMO LC-A (Lomo Kompakt Automat) is a fixed lens, 35 mm film, leaf shutter, zone focus, and compact camera introduced in 1984. Its design is based on the Japanese Cosina CX-2, with the difference being that it lacks a swiveling front and self-timer. It was built in Soviet-era Leningrad, now St. Petersburg, by the Leningrad Optics and Mechanics Association (LOMO).

Production of the camera ceased in 1994. In the mid-1990s, a group of enthusiasts from Vienna, Austria persuaded LOMO to restart production, which continued until 2005, and they formed the Lomographic Society International, distributing these cameras around the world.

The LOMO LC-A's replacement, the LC-A+, was introduced in 2006 and production moved to China. The LC-A+ featured the original LC-A Minitar-1 glass lens manufactured by LOMO in Russia. This changed in 2007 and lenses on subsequent models have been made in China. Some LC-As were sold badged as Zenith, this label was only a sticker underneath the lens. Zenit (Zenith in some countries) is a trademark of KMZ (Krasnogorsk Mechanical Works).

Austrian company Lomography now offers three versions of the LC-A, the LC-A+ and LC-Wide in 35 mm format and the LC-A 120 in medium format.

== Operation ==
The only automatic function offered by the LC-A is exposure. Film loading, winding, rewinding, and focus adjustments are accomplished manually. The aperture can also be set manually, the shutter speed is fixed at 1/60 s (this ability was removed from the LC-A+).

Exposure is completely automatic when the camera is set to "A"; the shutter speeds range from 2 minutes to 1/500 s. The aperture range is f/2.8 to f/16. The automatic exposure system compensates for changes in light levels after the shutter is opened by increasing or decreasing the shutter speed. This, in conjunction with the rear-curtain flash-sync, results in interesting effects with flash photography in low ambient light levels.

The lens is focused by selecting one of four zones (0.8 m, 1.5 m, 3 m or ∞). Older versions of the camera feature viewfinder icons showing the currently selected focus zone, a feature omitted from later models.

A battery checking feature uses a LED inside the viewfinder; if there is sufficient power this illuminates whenever the shutter release button is lightly depressed. Another viewfinder LED illuminates whenever the camera's chosen shutter speed is below 1/30 s.

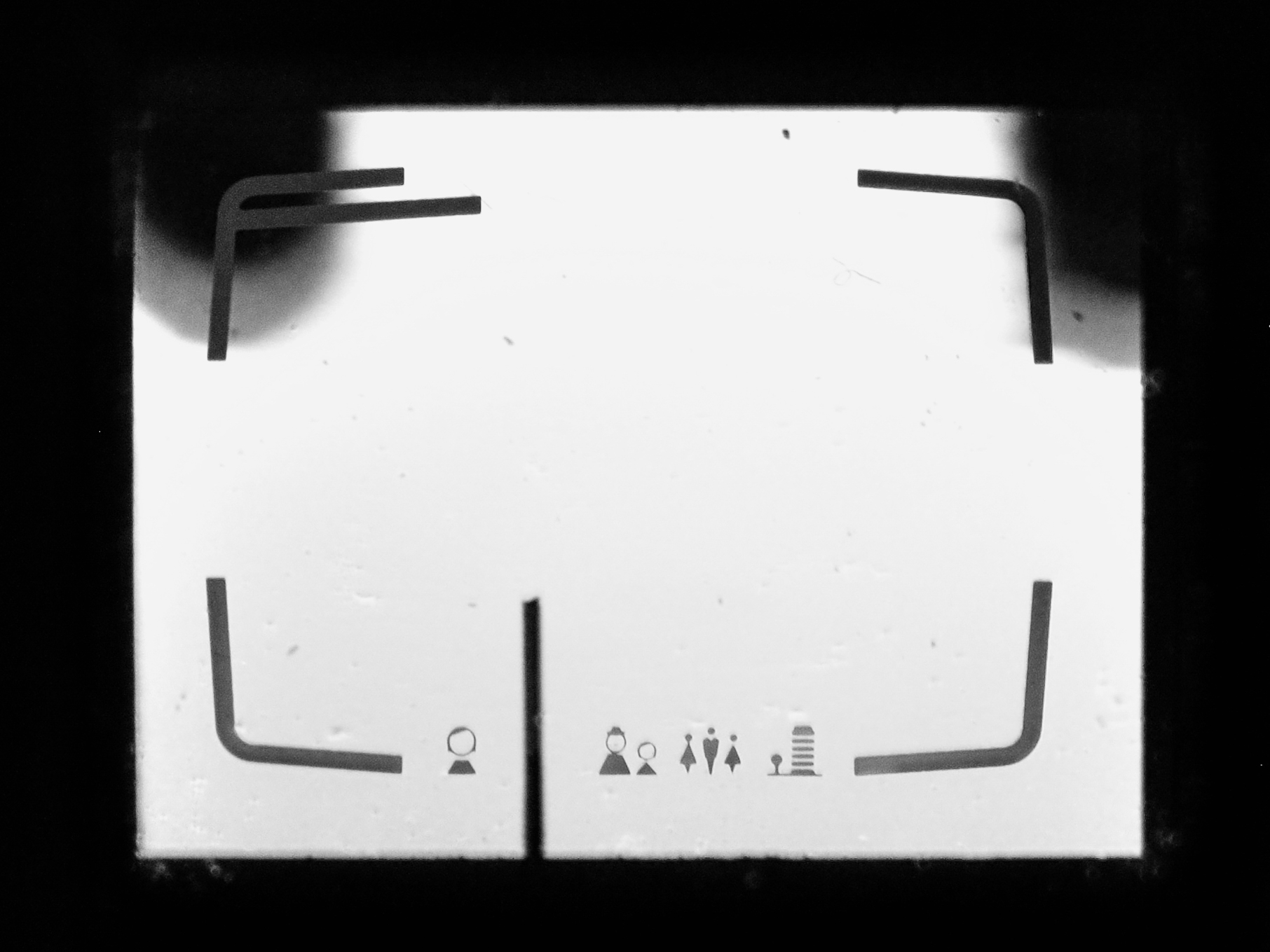
Lomo LC-A Viewfinder

== Body design ==
The size and shape is very close to that of the Cosina CX-2, the main difference being that the lens bezel is fixed (unlike the rotating one of the CX-2). Power is supplied by three 1.5v silver oxide cells (S76, LR44).

== See also ==
- Lomography
- Cosina
- Minox, especially Minox 35 mm compact cameras
- Olympus XA
