= Cinematography =

Art of motion picture photography

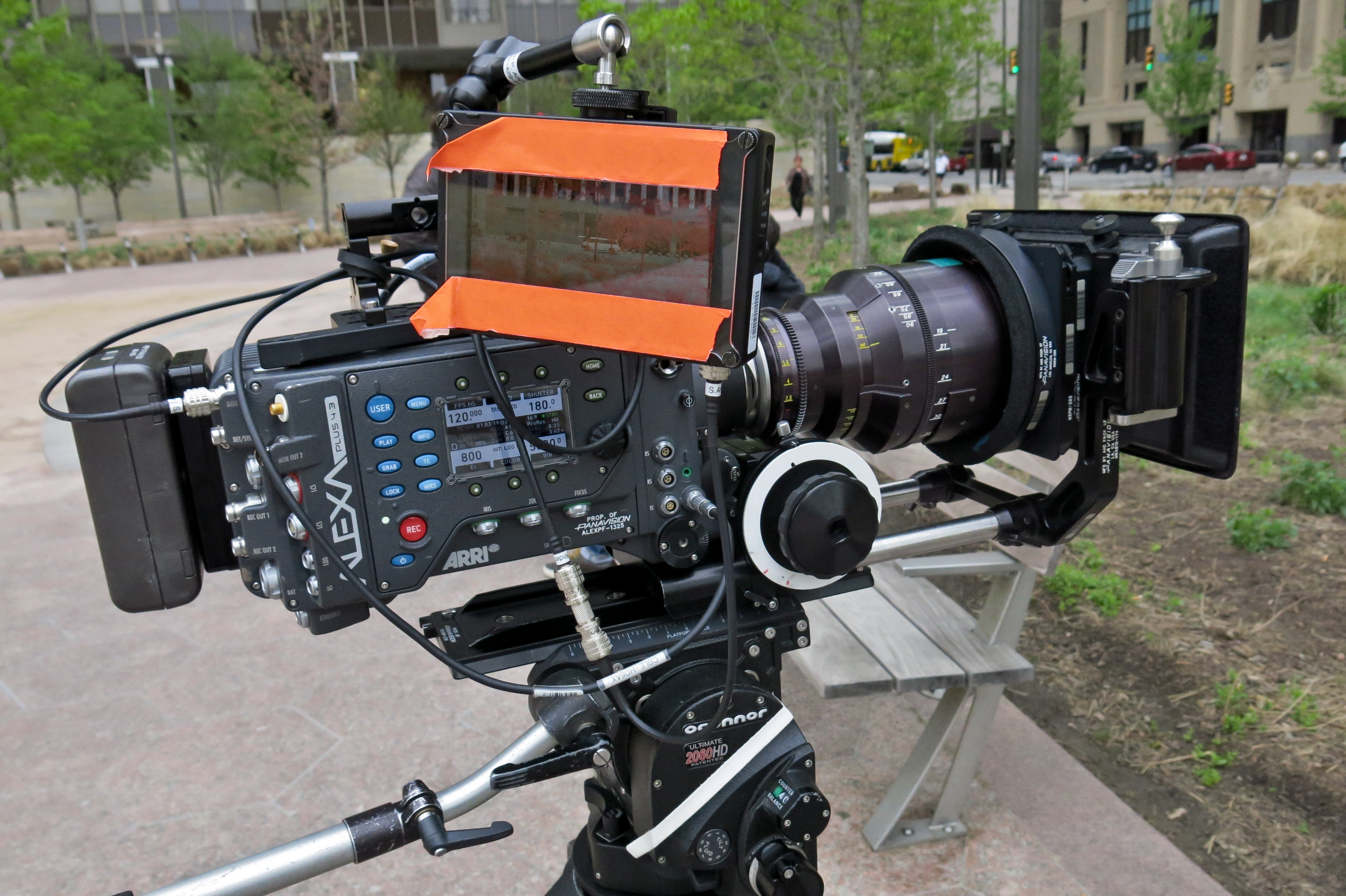
Arri Alexa, a digital movie camera

Cinematography (from Ancient Greek κίνημα (kínēma) 'movement' and γράφειν (gráphein) 'to write, draw, paint, etc.') is the art of motion picture (and more recently, electronic video camera) photography.

Cinematographers use a lens to focus reflected light from objects into a real image that is transferred to some image sensor or light-sensitive material inside the movie camera. These exposures are created sequentially and preserved for later processing and viewing as a motion picture. Capturing images with an electronic image sensor produces an electrical charge for each pixel in the image, which is electronically processed and stored in a video file for subsequent processing or display. Images captured with photographic emulsion result in a series of invisible latent images on the film stock, which are chemically "developed" into a visible image. The images on the film stock are projected for viewing in the same motion picture.

Cinematography finds uses in many fields of science and business, as well as for entertainment purposes and mass communication.

== History ==
=== Precursors ===
An Eadweard Muybridge sequence of a horse galloping

In the 1830s, three different solutions for moving images were invented based on the concept of revolving drums and disks, the stroboscope by Simon von Stampfer in Austria, the phenakistoscope by Joseph Plateau in Belgium, and the zoetrope by William Horner in Britain.

In 1845, Francis Ronalds invented the first successful camera able to make continuous recordings of the varying indications of meteorological and geomagnetic instruments over time. The cameras were supplied to numerous observatories around the world and some remained in use until well into the 20th century.

William Lincoln patented a device in 1867 that showed animated pictures called the "wheel of life" or "zoopraxiscope". In it moving drawings or photographs were watched through a slit.

On 19 June 1878, Eadweard Muybridge successfully photographed a horse named "Sallie Gardner" in fast motion using a series of 24 stereoscopic cameras. The cameras were arranged along a track parallel to the horse's, and each camera shutter was controlled by a tripwire triggered by the horse's hooves. They were 21 inches apart to cover the 20 feet taken by the horse's stride, taking pictures at one-thousandth of a second. At the end of the decade, Muybridge had adapted sequences of his photographs to a zoopraxiscope for short, primitive projected "movies", which were sensations on his lecture tours by 1879 or 1880.

Four years later, in 1882, French scientist Étienne-Jules Marey invented a chronophotographic gun, which was capable of taking 12 consecutive frames a second and recording all the frames of the same picture.

The late nineteenth to the early twentieth centuries brought rise to the use of film not only for entertainment purposes but for scientific exploration as well. French biologist and filmmaker Jean Painleve lobbied heavily for the use of film in the scientific field, as the new medium was more efficient in capturing and documenting the behavior, movement, and environment of microorganisms, cells, and bacteria, than the naked eye. The introduction of film into scientific fields allowed for not only the viewing of "new images and objects, such as cells and natural objects, but also the viewing of them in real time", whereas prior to the invention of moving pictures, scientists and doctors alike had to rely on hand-drawn sketches of human anatomy and its microorganisms. This posed a great inconvenience to the scientific and medical worlds. The development of film and increased usage of cameras allowed doctors and scientists to grasp a better understanding and knowledge of their projects.

The origins of today's cinema go back to the Lumière brothers, Auguste and Louis, who in 1895 developed a machine called the Cinematographe, which had the ability to capture and show moving images. The early era of cinema saw rapid innovation. In the early-to-mid-20th Century, filmmakers discovered and applied new methods such as editing, special effects, close-ups, sound, widescreen, color films, and more. Hollywood began to emerge as the Mecca of the film industry, and many of the famous studios from that time still exist over 100 years later in the early-mid 21st century.

=== Film ===
Roundhay Garden Scene (1888), the world's earliest surviving motion-picture film

The experimental film Roundhay Garden Scene, filmed by Louis Le Prince in Roundhay, Leeds, England, on 14 October 1888, is the earliest surviving motion picture. This movie was shot on paper film.

An experimental film camera was developed by British inventor William Friese Greene and patented in 1889. W. K. L. Dickson, working under the direction of Thomas Alva Edison, was the first to design a successful apparatus, the Kinetograph, patented in 1891. This camera took a series of instantaneous photographs on standard Eastman Kodak photographic emulsion coated onto a transparent celluloid strip 35 mm wide. The results of this work were first shown in public in 1893, using the viewing apparatus also designed by Dickson, the Kinetoscope. Housed within a large box, the apparatus allowed only one person at a time to view the movie by looking through a peephole.

In the following year, Charles Francis Jenkins and his projector, the Phantoscope, made a successful audience viewing while Louis and Auguste Lumière perfected the Cinématographe, an apparatus that took, printed, and projected film, in Paris in December 1895. The Lumière brothers were the first to present projected moving photographic pictures to a paying audience of more than one person.

In 1896, movie theaters were open in France (Paris, Lyon, Bordeaux, Nice, Marseille); Italy (Rome, Milan, Naples, Genoa, Venice, Bologna, Forlì); Brussels; and London. The chronological improvements in the medium may be listed concisely. In 1896, Edison showed his improved Vitascope projector, the first commercially successful projector in the U.S. Cooper Hewitt invented mercury lamps which made it practical to shoot films indoors without sunlight in 1905. The first animated cartoon was produced in 1906. Credits began to appear at the beginning of motion pictures in 1911. The Bell and Howell 2709 movie camera invented in 1915 allowed directors to make close-ups without physically moving the camera. By the late 1920s, most of the movies produced were sound films. Wide screen formats were first experimented with in the 1950s. By the 1970s, most movies were color films. IMAX and other 70mm formats gained popularity. Wide distribution of films became commonplace, setting the ground for "blockbusters." Film cinematography dominated the motion picture industry from its inception until the 2010s when digital cinematography became dominant. Film cinematography is still used by some directors, especially in specific applications or out of fondness for the format.

=== Black and white ===
From its birth in the 1880s, movies were predominantly monochrome. Contrary to popular belief, monochrome does not always mean black-and-white; it means a movie shot in a single tone or color. Since the cost of tinted film bases was substantially higher, most movies were produced in black-and-white monochrome. Even with the advent of early color experiments, the greater expense of color meant films were mostly made in black-and-white until the 1950s, when cheaper color processes were introduced. By the 1960s, color became by far the dominant film stock. In the coming decades, the usage of color film greatly increased, while monochrome films became scarce.

Black-and-white cinematography captures and presents images in shades of gray. Prior to the widespread availability of color film, this was the standard format for motion pictures. Filmmakers utilized the format to emphasize the contrast, texture and lighting for visual composition.

Casablanca is one of many films to utilize black and white cinematography to create atmospheric scenes. Its trailer showcases the "Kiss Me" scene featuring Humphrey Bogart and Ingrid Bergman. It depicts two characters under shadows, soft lighting, and contrast to create a sense of longing and emotional intensity. The absence of color makes the actors have more defined facial expressions, drawing attention to the deep emotion conveyed between Rick Blaine and Ilsa Lund.

Ken Dancyger's book The Technique of Film and Video Editing: History, Theory, and Practice provides insights into the historical and theoretical aspects of black-and-white cinematography. Dancyger explores how this technique has been employed, examining its impact on storytelling, mood, and visual aesthetics. The book delves into the artistic choices and technical considerations involved in creating compelling black-and-white imagery, offering an understanding of the technique.

Black-and-white cinematography allows filmmakers to focus on the interplay of light and shadow, emphasizing the contrast between different elements within a scene. This technique can evoke a sense of nostalgia, evoke a specific time period, or create a timeless and classic feel. By stripping away color, filmmakers can emphasize the composition, shapes, and textures within the frame, enhancing the visual impact. Notable films that have employed black-and-white cinematography include classics such as Casablanca (1942), Raging Bull (1980), and Schindler's List (1993). These films showcase the power and versatility of black-and-white cinematography in creating emotionally resonant visuals. Black-and-white cinematography remains a relevant and widely used technique in modern filmmaking. It continues to be employed by filmmakers to evoke specific moods, convey a sense of timelessness, and enhance the artistic expression of their stories.

=== Color ===
Annabelle Serpentine Dance, hand-tinted version (1895)

After the advent of motion pictures, a tremendous amount of energy was invested in the production of photography in natural color. The invention of the talking picture further increased the demand for the use of color photography. However, in comparison to other technological advances of the time, the arrival of color photography was a relatively slow process.

Early movies were not actually color movies since they were shot monochrome and hand-colored or machine-colored afterward (such movies are referred to as colored and not color). The earliest such example is the hand-tinted Annabelle Serpentine Dance in 1895 by Edison Manufacturing Company. Machine-based tinting later became popular. Tinting continued until the advent of natural color cinematography in the 1910s. Many black-and-white movies have been colorized recently using digital tinting. This includes footage shot from both world wars, sporting events and political propaganda.

In 1902, Edward Raymond Turner produced the first films with a natural color process rather than using colorization techniques. In 1909, Kinemacolor was first shown to the public.

In 1917, the earliest version of Technicolor was introduced. Kodachrome was introduced in 1935. Eastmancolor was introduced in 1950 and became the color standard for the rest of the century.

In the 2010s, color films were largely superseded by color digital cinematography.

=== Digital video ===
In digital cinematography, the movie is shot on digital media such as flash storage, as well as distributed through a digital medium such as a hard drive.

The basis for digital cameras are metal–oxide–semiconductor (MOS) image sensors. The first practical semiconductor image sensor was the charge-coupled device (CCD), based on MOS capacitor technology. Following the commercialization of CCD sensors during the late 1970s to early 1980s, the entertainment industry slowly began transitioning to digital imaging and digital video over the next two decades. The CCD was followed by the CMOS active-pixel sensor (CMOS sensor), developed in the 1990s.

Beginning in the late 1980s, Sony began marketing the concept of "electronic cinematography", utilizing its analog Sony HDVS professional video cameras. The effort met with very little success. However, this led to one of the earliest digitally shot feature movies, Julia and Julia (1987). In 1998, with the introduction of HDCAM recorders and 1920×1080 pixel digital professional video cameras based on CCD technology, the idea, now re-branded as "digital cinematography", began to gain traction.

Shot and released in 1998, The Last Broadcast is believed by some to be the first feature-length video shot and edited entirely on consumer-level digital equipment. In May 1999, George Lucas challenged the supremacy of the movie-making medium of film for the first time by including footage filmed with high-definition digital cameras in Star Wars: Episode I – The Phantom Menace. In late 2013, Paramount became the first major studio to distribute movies to theaters in digital format, eliminating 35mm film entirely. Since then the demand of movies to be developed onto digital format rather than 35mm has increased significantly.

As digital technology improved, movie studios began increasingly shifting toward digital cinematography. Since the 2010s, digital cinematography has become the dominant form of cinematography after largely superseding film cinematography.

== Aspects ==
Numerous aspects contribute to the art of cinematography, including:

=== Cinema technique ===
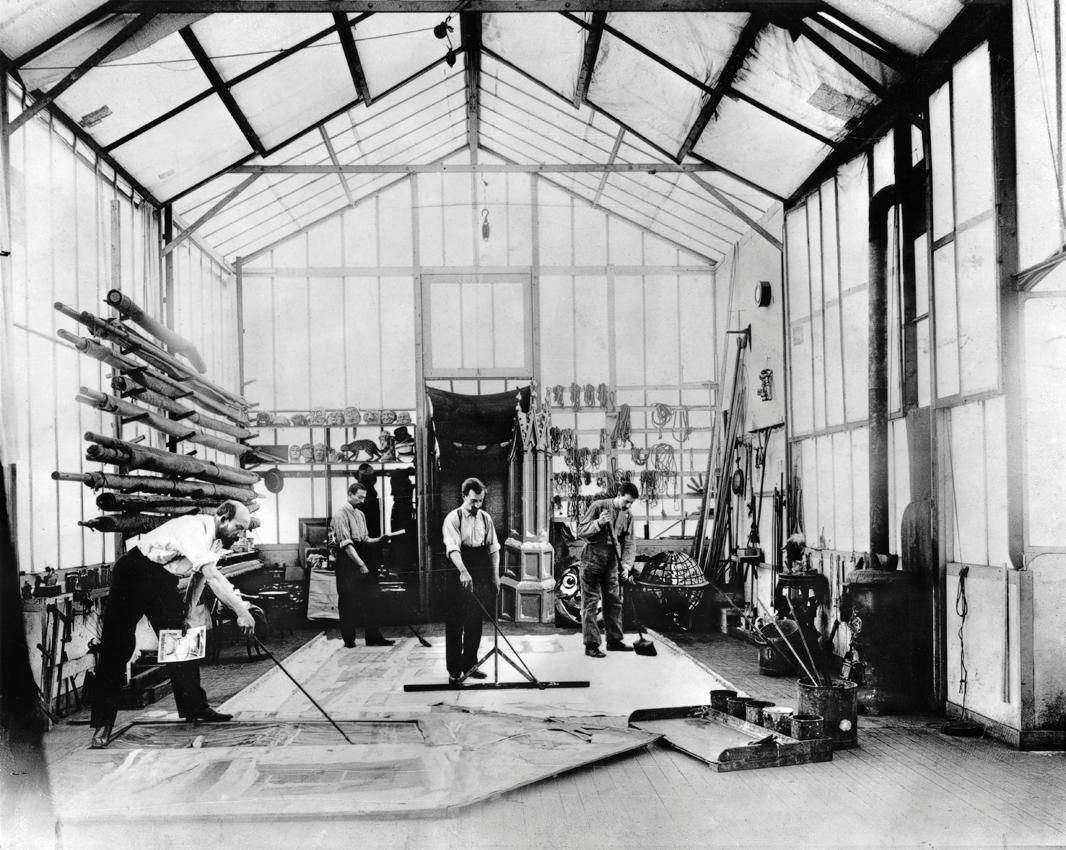
Georges Méliès (left) painting a backdrop in his studio

The first film cameras were fastened directly to the head of a tripod or other support, with only the crudest kind of leveling devices provided, in the manner of the still-camera tripod heads of the period. The earliest film cameras were thus effectively fixed during the shot, and hence the first camera movements were the result of mounting a camera on a moving vehicle. The first known of these was a film shot by a Lumière cameraman from the back platform of a train leaving Jerusalem in 1896, and by 1898, there were a number of films shot from moving trains. Although listed under the general heading of "panoramas" in the sales catalogues of the time, those films shot straight forward from in front of a railway engine were usually specifically referred to as "phantom rides".

In 1897, Robert W. Paul had the first real rotating camera head made to put on a tripod, so that he could follow the passing processions of Queen Victoria's Diamond Jubilee in one uninterrupted shot. This device had the camera mounted on a vertical axis that could be rotated by a worm gear driven by turning a crank handle, and Paul put it on general sale the next year. Shots taken using such a "panning" head were also referred to as "panoramas" in the film catalogues of the first decade of the cinema. This eventually led to the creation of a panoramic photo as well.

The standard pattern for early film studios was provided by the studio which Georges Méliès had built in 1897. This had a glass roof and three glass walls constructed after the model of large studios for still photography, and it was fitted with thin cotton cloths that could be stretched below the roof to diffuse the direct ray of the sun on sunny days. The soft overall light without real shadows that this arrangement produced, which also exists naturally on lightly overcast days, was to become the basis for film lighting in film studios for the next decade.

Black-and-white cinematography is a technique used in filmmaking where the images are captured and presented in shades of gray, without color. This artistic approach has a rich history and has been employed in various films throughout cinema's evolution. It is a powerful tool that allows filmmakers to emphasize contrast, texture, and lighting, enhancing the visual storytelling experience. The use of black-and-white cinematography dates back to the early days of cinema when color film was not yet available. Filmmakers relied on this technique to create visually striking and atmospheric films. Even with the advent of color film technology, black-and-white cinematography continued to be utilized for artistic and thematic purposes. Ken Dancyger's book The Technique of Film and Video Editing: History, Theory, and Practice provides valuable insights into the historical and theoretical aspects of black-and-white cinematography. Dancyger explores how this technique has been employed throughout film history, examining its impact on storytelling, mood, and visual aesthetics. The book delves into the artistic choices and technical considerations involved in creating compelling black-and-white imagery, offering a comprehensive understanding of the technique.

Black-and-white cinematography allows filmmakers to focus on the interplay of light and shadow, emphasizing the contrast between different elements within a scene. This technique can evoke a sense of nostalgia, evoke a specific time period, or create a timeless and classic feel. By stripping away color, filmmakers can emphasize the composition, shapes, and textures within the frame, enhancing the visual impact. Notable films that have employed black-and-white cinematography include classics such as Casablanca (1942), Raging Bull (1980), and Schindler's List (1993). These films showcase the power and versatility of black-and-white cinematography in creating emotionally resonant visuals. Black-and-white cinematography remains a relevant and widely used technique in modern filmmaking. It continues to be employed by filmmakers to evoke specific moods, convey a sense of timelessness, and enhance the artistic expression of their stories.

There are many types of Cinematography that each differ based on production purpose and process. These different types of Cinematography are similar in the sense that they all have the goal of conveying a specific emotion, mood or feeling. For each different style however they can often convey different emotions and purposes. Some examples of different types of Cinematography can be known as Realism. This style of cinematography aims to create a realistic portrayal of the world, often using natural lighting, handheld cameras, and a documentary-like approach to filming. Classic Hollywood is a style of cinematography characterized by its use of highly polished, studio-produced films with glamorous sets, bright lighting, and romanticized narratives. Film Noir is a style of cinematography that is characterized by its use of stark contrast and chiaroscuro lighting, low-key lighting, and a dark, brooding atmosphere. It often features crime, mystery, and morally ambiguous characters.

=== Aspects of a cinema that affect a film ===
To convey mood, emotion, narrative and other factors within the shot, cinematography is implemented by using different aspects within a film. Lighting on the scene can affect the mood of a scene or film. Darker shots with less natural light can be gloomy, scary, sad, intense. Brighter lighting can equate to a happier, exciting, more positive mood. Camera angle can affect a scene by setting perspective. It conveys how characters or the audience see something, and through what angle. Camera angle can also play an important role by highlighting either a close up detail, or background setting. A close up angle can highlight detail on someone's face, while a wider lens can give key information that takes place in the background of a shot. Camera distance can highlight specific details that can be important to a film shot. From very far away, a group of people can all look the same, but once you zoom in very close, the viewer is able to see differences within the population through details like facial expression and body language. Coloring is similar to lighting, in the way that it plays an important role in setting mood and emotion throughout a shot. A color like green can convey balance and peace through scenes of nature. A shot with a lot of red can express anger, intensity, passion or love. While some of these emotions might not come out intentionally while seeing color, it is a subconscious fact that color within cinematography can have a large effect. Speed is a vital element in cinematography that can be used in a variety of ways, such as the creation of action, or a sense of movement. Speed can be further used to slow down time, highlight important moments, and oftentimes build a sense of suspense in a film. Slow motion is a technique which involves filming at a higher frame rate, then playing the footage again at a normal speed. This creates a slowed-down effect in the film, which can put emphasis on or add fluidity to a scene. On the other hand, fast motion is the opposite of slow motion, filming at a lower frame rate and then playing the film back at a normal speed. This creates a sped-up effect which can help to emphasize passage of time, or create a sense of urgency. Time lapse is when you take a series of still photographs at a regular interval over a long period of time. From here, if you play them back continuously, a sped-up effect is shown. Time lapses are used most effectively to show things like sunrises, natural movement, or growth. They are commonly used to show passage of time in a shorter sequence. Reverse motion is filming a scene normally, then playing the film in reverse. This is usually used to create uncommon/surreal effects, and create unusual scenes. The various techniques involving speed all can add to a films intensity, vibe, show passage of time, and have many other effects. Camera movement within a film can play a role in enhancing the visual quality and impact of a film. Some aspects of camera movement that contribute to this are:

- Zooming: This movement involves changing the focal length of the lens to make the subject appear closer or farther away. It can be used to create a sense of intimacy or distance from the subject.
- Tilt: Rotating the camera vertically from a fixed position. It can be used to show the height of a subject or to emphasize a particular element in the scene.
- Panning: Rotating the camera horizontally from a fixed position. It can be used to follow a moving subject or to show a wide view of a scene.
- Pedestal/Booming/Jibbing: Moving a camera vertically in its entirety. This can be used to show vertical movement relative to a subject in a frame.
- Trucking: Moving a camera horizontally in its entirety. This can be used to show horizontal movement relative to a subject in a frame.
- Rolling: Rotating a camera in its entirety in a horizontal manner.

=== Image sensor and film stock ===
Cinematography can begin with digital image sensor or rolls of film. Advancements in film emulsion and grain structure provided a wide range of available film stocks. The selection of a film stock is one of the first decisions made in preparing a typical film production.

Aside from the film gauge selection – 8 mm (amateur), 16 mm (semi-professional), 35 mm (professional) and 65 mm (epic photography, rarely used except in special event venues) – the cinematographer has a selection of stocks in reversal (which, when developed, create a positive image) and negative formats along with a wide range of film speeds (varying sensitivity to light) from ISO 50 (slow, least sensitive to light) to 800 (very fast, extremely sensitive to light) and differing response to color (low saturation, high saturation) and contrast (varying levels between pure black (no exposure) and pure white (complete overexposure). Advancements and adjustments to nearly all gauges of film create the "super" formats wherein the area of the film used to capture a single frame of an image is expanded, although the physical gauge of the film remains the same. Super 8 mm, Super 16 mm, and Super 35 mm all utilize more of the overall film area for the image than their "regular" non-super counterparts. The larger the film gauge, the higher the overall image resolution clarity and technical quality. The techniques used by the film laboratory to process the film stock can also offer a considerable variance in the image produced. By controlling the temperature and varying the duration in which the film is soaked in the development chemicals, and by skipping certain chemical processes (or partially skipping all of them), cinematographers can achieve very different looks from a single film stock in the laboratory. Some techniques that can be used are push processing, bleach bypass, and cross processing.

Most of modern cinema uses digital cinematography and has no film stocks, but the cameras themselves can be adjusted in ways that go far beyond the abilities of one particular film stock. They can provide varying degrees of color sensitivity, image contrast, light sensitivity and so on. One camera can achieve all the various looks of different emulsions. Digital image adjustments such as ISO and contrast are executed by estimating the same adjustments that would take place if actual film were in use, and are thus vulnerable to the camera's sensor designers perceptions of various film stocks and image adjustment parameters.

=== Filters ===
Filters, such as diffusion filters or color effect filters, are also widely used to enhance mood or dramatic effects. Most photographic filters are made up of two pieces of optical glass glued together with some form of image or light manipulation material between the glass. In the case of color filters, there is often a translucent color medium pressed between two planes of optical glass. Color filters work by blocking out certain color wavelengths of light from reaching the film. With color film, this works very intuitively wherein a blue filter will cut down on the passage of red, orange, and yellow light and create a blue tint on the film. In black-and-white photography, color filters are used somewhat counter-intuitively; for instance, a yellow filter, which cuts down on blue wavelengths of light, can be used to darken a daylight sky (by eliminating blue light from hitting the film, thus greatly underexposing the mostly blue sky) while not biasing most human flesh tone. Filters can be used in front of the lens or, in some cases, behind the lens for different effects.

Certain cinematographers are well known for their innovative use of filters, such as Christopher Doyle in his many collaborations with Wong Kar-Wai.

=== Lens ===
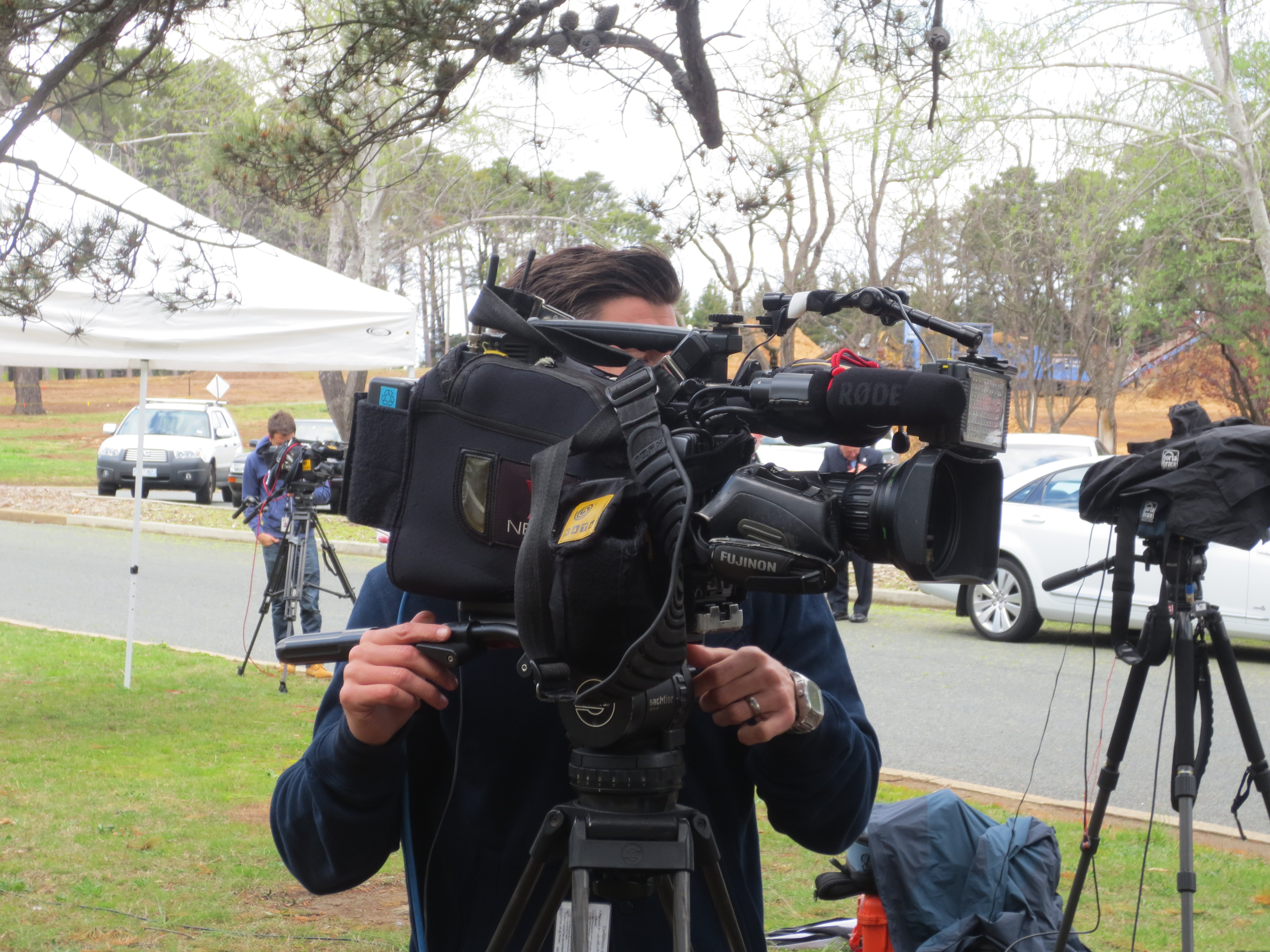
Live recording for TV on a camera with a Fujinon optical lens

Lenses can be attached to the camera to give a certain look, feel, or effect by focus, color, etc. As does the human eye, the camera creates perspective and spatial relations with the rest of the world. However, unlike one's eye, a cinematographer can select different lenses for different purposes. Variation in focal length is one of the chief benefits. The focal length of the lens determines the angle of view and, therefore, the field of view. Cinematographers can choose from a range of wide-angle lenses, "normal" lenses and long focus lenses, as well as macro lenses and other special effect lens systems such as borescope lenses. Wide-angle lenses have short focal lengths and make spatial distances more obvious. A person in the distance is shown as much smaller while someone in the front will loom large. On the other hand, long focus lenses reduce such exaggerations, depicting far-off objects as seemingly close together and flattening perspective. The differences between the perspective rendering is actually not due to the focal length by itself, but by the distance between the subjects and the camera. Therefore, the use of different focal lengths in combination with different camera to subject distances creates these different rendering. Changing the focal length only while keeping the same camera position does not affect perspective but the camera angle of view only.

A zoom lens allows a camera operator to change his focal length within a shot or quickly between setups for shots. As prime lenses offer greater optical quality and are "faster" (larger aperture openings, usable in less light) than zoom lenses, they are often employed in professional cinematography over zoom lenses. Certain scenes or even types of filmmaking, however, may require the use of zooms for speed or ease of use, as well as shots involving a zoom move.

As in other photography, the control of the exposed image is done in the lens with the control of the diaphragm aperture. For proper selection, the cinematographer needs that all lenses be engraved with T-stop, not f-stop so that the eventual light loss due to the glass does not affect the exposure control when setting it using the usual meters. The choice of the aperture also affects image quality (aberrations) and depth of field.

=== Depth of field and focus ===
A deep focus shot from Citizen Kane (1941): everything, including the hat in the foreground and the boy (young Charles Foster Kane) in the distance, is in sharp focus.

Focal length and diaphragm aperture affect the depth of field of a scene – that is, how much the background, mid-ground and foreground will be rendered in "acceptable focus" (only one exact plane of the image is in precise focus) on the film or video target. Depth of field (not to be confused with depth of focus) is determined by the aperture size and the focal distance. A large or deep depth of field is generated with a very small iris aperture and focusing on a point in the distance, whereas a shallow depth of field will be achieved with a large (open) iris aperture and focusing closer to the lens. Depth of field is also governed by the format size. If one considers the field of view and angle of view, the smaller the image is, the shorter the focal length should be, as to keep the same field of view. Then, the smaller the image is, the more depth of field is obtained, for the same field of view. Therefore, 70mm has less depth of field than 35mm for a given field of view, 16mm more than 35mm, and early video cameras, as well as most modern consumer level video cameras, even more depth of field than 16mm.

In Citizen Kane (1941), cinematographer Gregg Toland and director Orson Welles used tighter apertures to create every detail of the foreground and background of the sets in sharp focus. This practice is known as deep focus. Deep focus became a popular cinematographic device from the 1940s onward in Hollywood. Today, the trend is for more shallow focus. To change the plane of focus from one object or character to another within a shot is commonly known as a rack focus.

Early in the transition to digital cinematography, the inability of digital video cameras to easily achieve shallow depth of field, due to their small image sensors, was initially an issue of frustration for film makers trying to emulate the look of 35mm film. Optical adapters were devised which accomplished this by mounting a larger format lens which projected its image, at the size of the larger format, on a ground glass screen preserving the depth of field. The adapter and lens then mounted on the small format video camera which in turn focused on the ground glass screen.

Digital SLR still cameras have sensor sizes similar to that of the 35mm film frame, and thus are able to produce images with similar depth of field. The advent of video functions in these cameras sparked a revolution in digital cinematography, with more and more film makers adopting still cameras for the purpose because of the film-like qualities of their images. More recently, more and more dedicated video cameras are being equipped with larger sensors capable of 35mm film-like depth of field.

=== Aspect ratio and framing ===
The aspect ratio of an image is the ratio of its width to its height. This can be expressed either as a ratio of 2 integers, such as 4:3, or in a decimal format, such as 1.33:1 or simply 1.33. Different ratios provide different aesthetic effects. Standards for aspect ratio have varied significantly over time.

During the silent era, aspect ratios varied widely, from square 1:1, all the way up to the extreme widescreen 4:1 Polyvision. However, from the 1910s, silent motion pictures generally settled on the ratio of 4:3 (1.33). The introduction of sound-on-film briefly narrowed the aspect ratio, to allow room for a sound stripe. In 1932, a new standard was introduced, the Academy ratio of 1.37, by means of thickening the frame line.

For years, mainstream cinematographers were limited to using the academy ratio, but in the 1950s, thanks to the popularity of Cinerama, widescreen ratios were introduced in an effort to pull audiences back into the theater and away from their home television sets. These new widescreen formats provided cinematographers a wider frame within which to compose their images.

Many different proprietary photographic systems were invented and used in the 1950s to create widescreen movies, but one dominated film: the anamorphic process, which optically squeezes the image to photograph twice the horizontal area to the same size vertical as standard "spherical" lenses. The first commonly used anamorphic format was CinemaScope, which used a 2.35 aspect ratio, although it was originally 2.55. CinemaScope was used from 1953 to 1967, but due to technical flaws in the design and its ownership by Fox, several third-party companies, led by Panavision's technical improvements in the 1950s, dominated the anamorphic cine lens market. Changes to SMPTE projection standards altered the projected ratio from 2.35 to 2.39 in 1970, although this did not change anything regarding the photographic anamorphic standards; all changes in respect to the aspect ratio of anamorphic 35 mm photography are specific to camera or projector gate sizes, not the optical system. After the "widescreen wars" of the 1950s, the motion-picture industry settled into 1.85 as a standard for theatrical projection in the United States and the United Kingdom. This is a cropped version of 1.37. Europe and Asia opted for 1.66 at first, although 1.85 has largely permeated these markets in recent decades. Certain "epic" or adventure movies utilized the anamorphic 2.39 (often incorrectly denoted '2.40').

In the 1990s, with the advent of high-definition video, television engineers created the 1.78 (16:9) ratio as a mathematical compromise between the theatrical standard of 1.85 and television's 1.33, as it was not practical to produce a traditional CRT television tube with a width of 1.85. Until that change, nothing had ever been originated in 1.78. Today, this is a standard for high-definition video and for widescreen television.

=== Lighting ===
Light is necessary to create an image exposure on a frame of film or on a digital target (CCD, etc.). The art of lighting for cinematography goes far beyond basic exposure, however, into the essence of visual storytelling. Lighting contributes considerably to the emotional response an audience has watching a motion picture. The increased usage of filters can greatly impact the final image and affect the lighting.

Importance of Lighting in Film Lighting in film is essential for three primary reasons: visibility, composition, and mood. Firstly, lighting ensures that the subject or scene is properly illuminated, allowing viewers to perceive the details and understand the narrative. It helps in guiding the audience's attention to specific elements within the frame, highlighting important characters or objects. Secondly, lighting contributes to the composition of a shot. Filmmakers strategically place lights to create balance, depth, and visual interest within the frame. It allows them to control the visual elements within the scene, emphasizing certain areas and de-emphasizing others. Lastly, lighting significantly impacts the mood and atmosphere of a film. By manipulating light intensity, color, and direction, filmmakers can evoke different emotions and enhance the narrative. Bright, even lighting may evoke a sense of safety and happiness, while low-key lighting with shadows can create tension, mystery, or fear. The choice of lighting style can also reflect the genre of the film, such as the high contrast lighting commonly used in film noir.

=== Lighting techniques ===
Numerous lighting techniques are employed in filmmaking to achieve desired effects. Here are some commonly used techniques: Three-Point Lighting: This classic technique involves the use of three lights: the key light, fill light, and backlight. The key light serves as the primary source, illuminating the subject from one side to create depth and dimension. The fill light reduces shadows caused by the key light, softening the overall lighting. The backlight separates the subject from the background, providing a halo effect and enhancing the sense of depth. High Key Lighting: High key lighting produces a bright, evenly lit scene, often used in comedies or light-hearted films. It minimizes shadows, creating a cheerful and upbeat atmosphere. Low Key Lighting: Low key lighting involves using a single key light or a few strategically placed lights to create strong contrasts and deep shadows. This technique is commonly used in film noir and horror genres to evoke suspense, mystery, or fear.

=== Natural lighting ===
Filmmakers sometimes employ natural lighting to create an authentic, realistic look. This technique utilizes existing light sources, such as sunlight or practical lamps, without additional artificial lighting. It is often seen in outdoor scenes or films aiming for a naturalistic aesthetic. Color Lighting: The use of colored lights or gels can dramatically alter the mood and atmosphere of a scene. Different colors evoke different emotions and can enhance storytelling. For example, warm tones like red or orange may create a sense of warmth or passion, while cool tones like blue can convey sadness or isolation.

=== Camera movement ===
Camera on a small motor vehicle representing a large one

Cinematography can not only depict a moving subject but can use a camera, which represents the audience's viewpoint or perspective, that moves during the course of filming. This movement plays a considerable role in the emotional language of film images and the audience's emotional reaction to the action. Techniques range from the most basic movements of panning (horizontal shift in viewpoint from a fixed position; like turning your head side-to-side) and tilting (vertical shift in viewpoint from a fixed position; like tipping your head back to look at the sky or down to look at the ground) to dollying (placing the camera on a moving platform to move it closer or farther from the subject), tracking (placing the camera on a moving platform to move it to the left or right), craning (moving the camera in a vertical position; being able to lift it off the ground as well as swing it side-to-side from a fixed base position), and combinations of the above. Early cinematographers often faced problems that were not common to other graphic artists because of the element of motion.

Cameras have been mounted to nearly every imaginable form of transportation. Most cameras can also be handheld, that is held in the hands of the camera operator who moves from one position to another while filming the action. Personal stabilizing platforms came into being in the late 1971s through the invention of Garrett Brown, which became known as the Steadicam. The Steadicam is a body harness and stabilization arm that connects to the camera, supporting the camera while isolating it from the operator's body movements. After the Steadicam patent expired in the early 1990s, many other companies began manufacturing their concept of the personal camera stabilizer. This invention is much more common throughout the cinematic world today. From feature-length films to the evening news, more and more networks have begun to use a personal camera stabilizer.

== Special effects ==
The first special effects in the cinema were created while the film was being shot. These came to be known as "in-camera" effects. Later, optical and digital effects were developed so that editors and visual effects artists could more tightly control the process by manipulating the film in post-production.

The 1896 movie The Execution of Mary Stuart shows an actor dressed as the queen placing her head on the execution block in front of a small group of bystanders in Elizabethan dress. The executioner brings his axe down, and the queen's severed head drops onto the ground. This trick was worked by stopping the camera and replacing the actor with a dummy, then restarting the camera before the axe falls. The two pieces of film were then trimmed and cemented together so that the action appeared continuous when the film was shown, thus creating an overall illusion and successfully laying the foundation for special effects.

This film was among those exported to Europe with the first Kinetoscope machines in 1895 and was seen by Georges Méliès, who was putting on magic shows in his Théâtre Robert-Houdin in Paris at the time. He took up filmmaking in 1896, and after making imitations of other films from Edison, Lumière, and Robert Paul, he made Escamotage d'un dame chez Robert-Houdin (The Vanishing Lady). This film shows a woman being made to vanish by using the same stop motion technique as the earlier Edison film. After this, Georges Méliès made many single shot films using this trick over the next couple of years.

=== Double exposure ===
A scene inset inside a circular vignette showing a "dream vision" in Santa Claus (1898)

The other basic technique for trick cinematography involves double exposure of the film in the camera, which was first done by George Albert Smith in July 1898 in the UK. Smith's The Corsican Brothers (1898) was described in the catalogue of the Warwick Trading Company, which took up the distribution of Smith's films in 1900, thus:

"One of the twin brothers returns home from shooting in the Corsican mountains, and is visited by the ghost of the other twin. By extremely careful photography the ghost appears *quite transparent*. After indicating that he has been killed by a sword-thrust, and appealing for vengeance, he disappears. A 'vision' then appears showing the fatal duel in the snow. To the Corsican's amazement, the duel and death of his brother are vividly depicted in the vision, and overcome by his feelings, he falls to the floor just as his mother enters the room."

The ghost effect was done by draping the set in black velvet after the main action had been shot, and then re-exposing the negative with the actor playing the ghost going through the actions at the appropriate part. Likewise, the vision, which appeared within a circular vignette or matte, was similarly superimposed over a black area in the backdrop to the scene, rather than over a part of the set with detail in it, so that nothing appeared through the image, which seemed quite solid. Smith used this technique again in Santa Claus (1898).

Georges Méliès first used superimposition on a dark background in La Caverne maudite (The Cave of the Demons) made a couple of months later in 1898, and elaborated it with many superimpositions in the one shot in Un Homme de têtes (The Four Troublesome Heads). He created further variations in subsequent films.

=== Frame rate selection ===
Motion picture images are presented to an audience at a constant speed. In the theater it is 24 frames per second, in NTSC (US) Television it is 30 frames per second (29.97 to be exact), in PAL (Europe) television it is 25 frames per second. This speed of presentation does not vary.

However, by varying the speed at which the image is captured, various effects can be created knowing that the faster or slower recorded image will be played at a constant speed. Giving the cinematographer even more freedom for creativity and expression to be made.

For instance, time-lapse photography is created by exposing an image at an extremely slow rate. If a cinematographer sets a camera to expose one frame every minute for four hours, and then that footage is projected at 24 frames per second, a four-hour event will take 10 seconds to present, and one can present the events of a whole day (24 hours) in just one minute.

The inverse of this, if an image is captured at speeds above that at which they will be presented, the effect is to greatly slow down (slow motion) the image. If a cinematographer shoots a person diving into a pool at 96 frames per second, and that image is played back at 24 frames per second, the presentation will take 4 times as long as the actual event. Extreme slow motion, capturing many thousands of frames per second can present things normally invisible to the human eye, such as bullets in flight and shockwaves travelling through media, a potentially powerful cinematographic technique.

In motion pictures, the manipulation of time and space is a considerable contributing factor to the narrative storytelling tools. Film editing plays a much stronger role in this manipulation, but frame rate selection in the photography of the original action is also a contributing factor to altering time. For example, Charlie Chaplin's Modern Times was shot at "silent speed" (18 fps) but projected at "sound speed" (24 fps), which makes the slapstick action appear even more frenetic.

Speed ramping, or simply "ramping", is a process whereby the capture frame rate of the camera changes over time. For example, if in the course of 10 seconds of capture, the capture frame rate is adjusted from 60 frames per second to 24 frames per second, when played back at the standard movie rate of 24 frames per second, a unique time-manipulation effect is achieved. For example, someone pushing a door open and walking out into the street would appear to start off in slow-motion, but in a few seconds later within the same shot, the person would appear to walk in "realtime" (normal speed). The opposite speed-ramping is done in The Matrix when Neo re-enters the Matrix for the first time to see the Oracle. As he comes out of the warehouse "load-point", the camera zooms into Neo at normal speed but as it gets closer to Neo's face, time seems to slow down, foreshadowing the manipulation of time itself within the Matrix later in the movie.

=== Reverse and slow motion ===
G. A. Smith initiated the technique of reverse motion and also improved the quality of self-motivating images. This he did by repeating the action a second time while filming it with an inverted camera and then joining the tail of the second negative to that of the first. The first films using this were Tipsy, Topsy, Turvy, and The Awkward Sign Painter, the latter which showed a sign painter lettering a sign, and then the painting on the sign vanishing under the painter's brush. The earliest surviving example of this technique is Smith's The House That Jack Built, made before September 1901. Here, a small boy is shown knocking down a castle just constructed by a little girl out of children's building blocks. A title then appears, saying "Reversed", and the action is repeated in reverse so that the castle re-erects itself under his blows.

Cecil Hepworth improved upon this technique by printing the negative of the forward motion backward, frame by frame, so that in the production of the print the original action was exactly reversed. Hepworth made The Bathers in 1900 in which bathers who have undressed and jumped into the water appear to spring backward out of it, and have their clothe magically fly back onto their bodies.

The use of different camera speeds also appeared around 1900. Robert Paul's On a Runaway Motor Car through Piccadilly Circus (1899), had the camera turn so slowly that when the film was projected at the usual 16 frames per second, the scenery appeared to be passing at great speed. Cecil Hepworth used the opposite effect in The Indian Chief and the Seidlitz powder (1901), in which a naïve Red Indian eats a lot of the fizzy stomach medicine, causing his stomach to expand and then he then leaps around balloon-like. This was done by cranking the camera faster than the normal 16 frames per second giving the first "slow motion" effect.

== Personnel ==
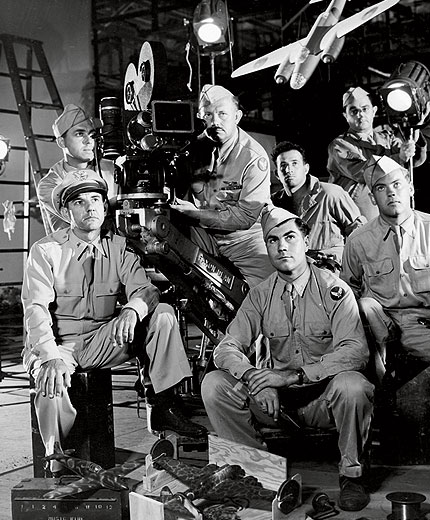
A camera crew from the First Motion Picture Unit

In descending order of seniority, the following staff is involved:

- Director of photography, also called cinematographer
- Camera operator, also called cameraman
- First assistant camera, also called focus puller
- Second assistant camera, also called clapper loader

In the film industry, the cinematographer is responsible for the technical aspects of the images (lighting, lens choices, composition, exposure, filtration, film selection), but works closely with the director to ensure that the artistic aesthetics are supporting the director's vision of the story being told. The cinematographers are the heads of the camera, grip and lighting crew on a set, and for this reason, they are often called directors of photography or DPs. The American Society of Cinematographers defines cinematography as a creative and interpretive process that culminates in the authorship of an original work of art rather than the simple recording of a physical event. Cinematography is not a subcategory of photography. Rather, photography is but one craft that the cinematographer uses in addition to other physical, organizational, managerial, interpretive. and image-manipulating techniques to effect one coherent process. In British tradition, if the DOP actually operates the camera him/herself they are called the cinematographer. On smaller productions, it is common for one person to perform all these functions alone. The career progression usually involves climbing up the ladder from seconding, firsting, eventually to operating the camera.

Directors of photography make many interpretive decisions during the course of their work, from pre-production to post-production, all of which affect the overall feel and look of the motion picture. Many of these decisions are similar to what a photographer needs to note when taking a picture: the cinematographer controls the film choice itself (from a range of available stocks with varying sensitivities to light and color), the selection of lens focal lengths, aperture exposure and focus. Cinematography, however, has a temporal aspect (see persistence of vision), unlike still photography, which is purely a single still image. It is also bulkier and more strenuous to deal with movie cameras, and it involves a more complex array of choices. As such a cinematographer often needs to work cooperatively with more people than does a photographer, who could frequently function as a single person. As a result, the cinematographer's job also includes personnel management and logistical organization. Given the in-depth knowledge, a cinematographer requires not only of his or her own craft but also that of other personnel, formal tuition in analogue or digital filmmaking can be advantageous.

== See also ==
- 3D film
- 360-degree video
- Academy Award for Best Cinematography
- Cinematographer
- Cinematography in healthcare
- Digital cinema
- Fictional film
- Film crew
- Filmmaking
- Filmmaking technique of Kurosawa
- Film theory
- Films about cinematography:
  - Visions of Light (1992)
  - Cinematographer Style (2006)
- Glossary of motion picture terms
- History of film
- List of motion picture film formats
- List of film techniques
- List of motion picture-related topics (extensive alphabetical listing and glossary).
- List of cinema of the world
- List of video-related topics
- Outline of film
- Photographic film
- Special effect
- Videography
