= Lo-fi photography =

Photography aesthetic that gives an impression of low quality

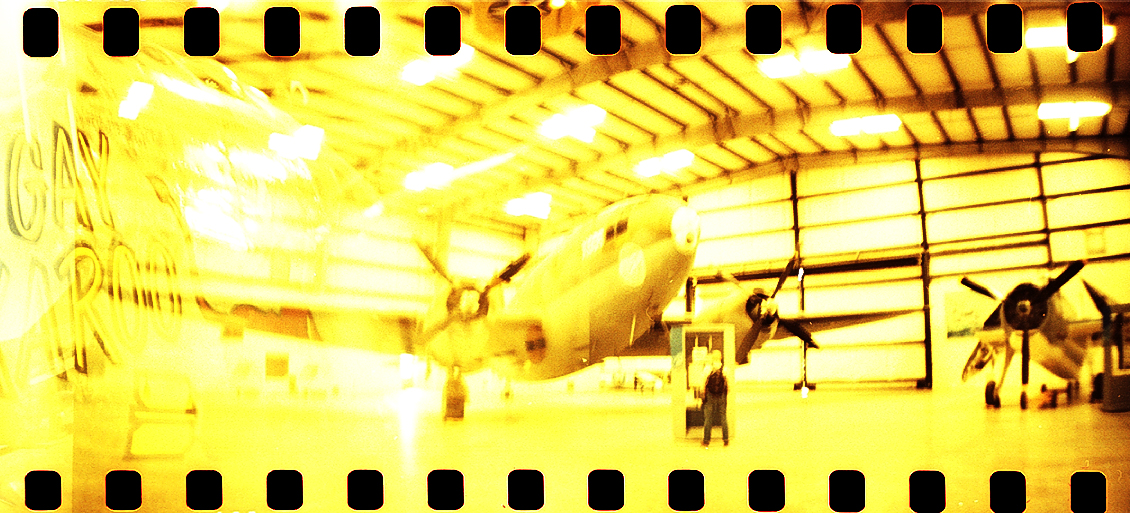
This overexposed film photograph featuring multiple exposures and visible sprocket holes is an example of a lo-fi photograph

Lo-fi photography ("lo-fi" meaning low-fidelity, referring to "any process which fails to achieve the accuracy and 'transparency'") refers to unconventional photographic practices, chosen for aesthetics, which give an impression of low quality. Popular techniques include the use of toy cameras or pinhole cameras, for their distinctive stylistic effects. It can be considered a reaction to the perceived ease of creating technically perfect photos in the digital age. Some emphasize a return to film, while others use digital technology to accomplish the same effects. Low-fidelity photography has also been commonly linked with lo-fi music as well.

== Details ==
Lo-fi photography uses film or digital photography techniques to create more of a soft, unusual look to photos compared to the crisp and high definition photographs that standard photography aims to provide. These lo-fi images can be any combination of distorted, soft, hazy, under/over exposed and in any way unusual. Often, creating these images is unpredictable and the final image may differ significantly than what the photographer intends. Lo-fi photography does not seek perfection; instead it revels in the unpredictable nature of the world and of the camera. For instance, light leaks, vignetting, and incorrect exposure can be sought-after if it helps the photographer achieve their desired effect. Lo-fi allows the photographer to take photographs without thinking and then choose the ones they like. This is what makes lo-fi photography enjoyable. Creating lo-fi photography is also cheap and can be done with any low mega-pixel camera, or any cheap film camera. Toy cameras or disposable cameras can be used. This is especially good for traveling because it is cheap to replace if broken or lost. However, there are specific cameras for purchase that can be used to create lo-fi photography. Since it is a low cost, minimal training type of photography, it is no surprise that lo-fi photography was discovered more prominently through Instagram. Lately, lo-fi photography has been de-emphasized on Instagram and has found its place on sources like Tumblr (https://www.tumblr.com/tagged/lofi%20photography) and the fediverse, best displayed on sites like https://pixelfed.social and https://pixey.org. Tags to check out on the fediverse include #retrophotography, #lofiphotography and #lomophotography. However, the low budget cameras and lack of needed equipment make it an easy type of photography to produce for up and coming photographers looking for an outlet. This style of photography is less of a straight edge photography style, and more of an art style, making the images taken hard to place in a timeline, with no other use other than to appeal to the eye. The clouded lens is reminiscent of art styles that many painters have used in their works, and many people are drawn in by the similarities of the photography to hand-drawn art forms. More tips about techniques are available in this article, “The Art and Science of Lo-Fi Photography” and this article “The Best Lofi Photography Techniques and Tips”

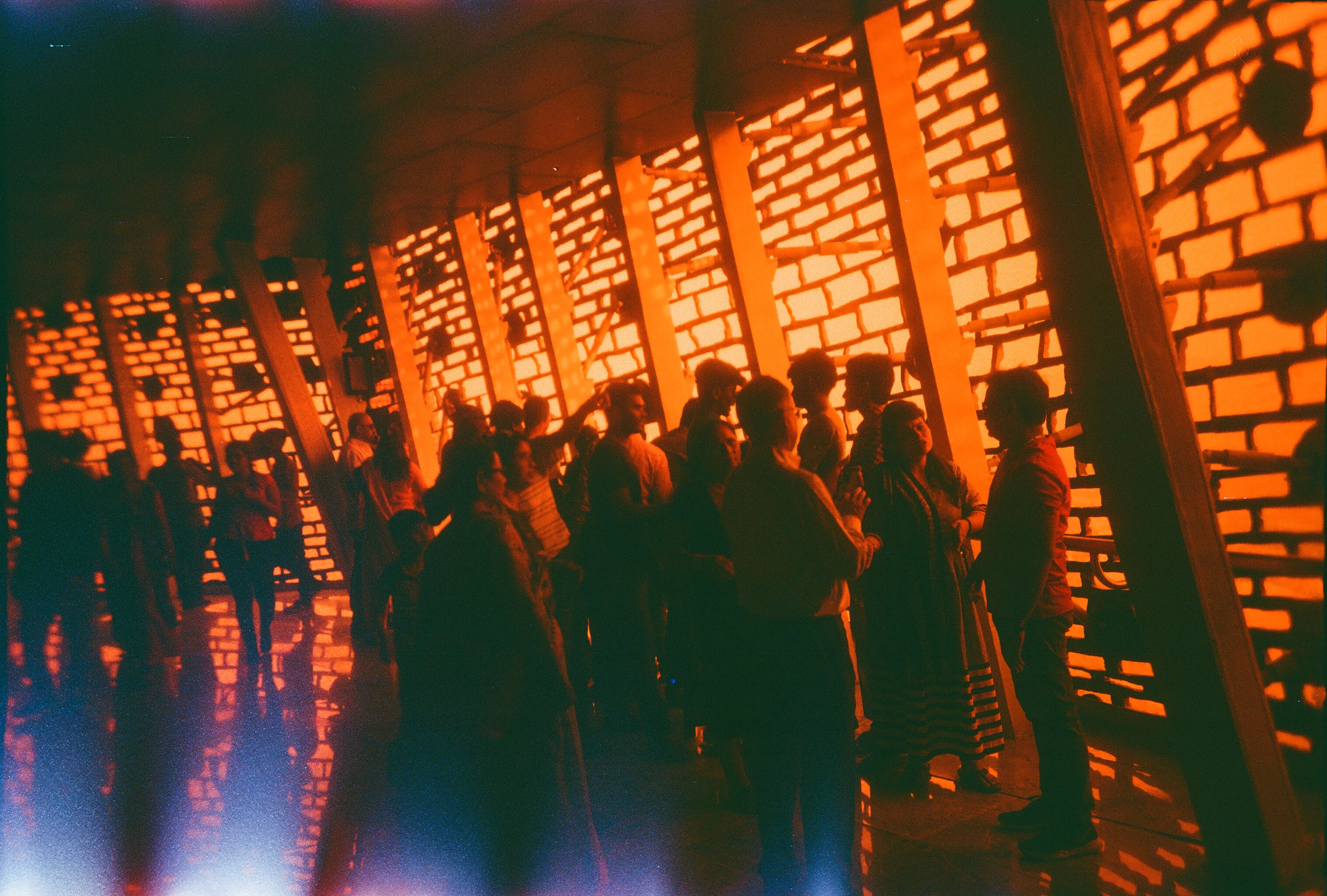
Underexposed redscale film photograph with light leaks (bottom left)

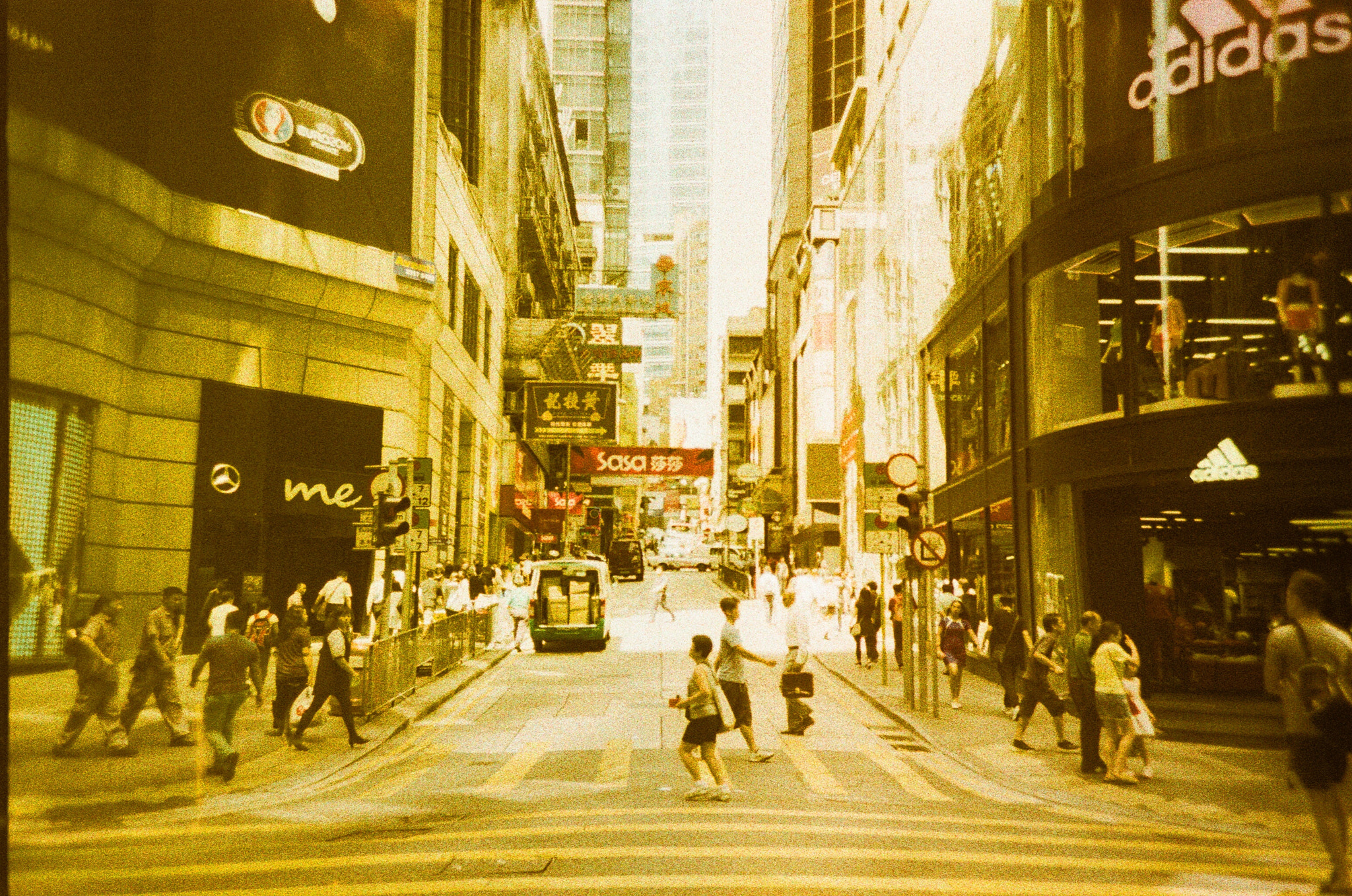
Photograph showing the effect of slide film cross-processing

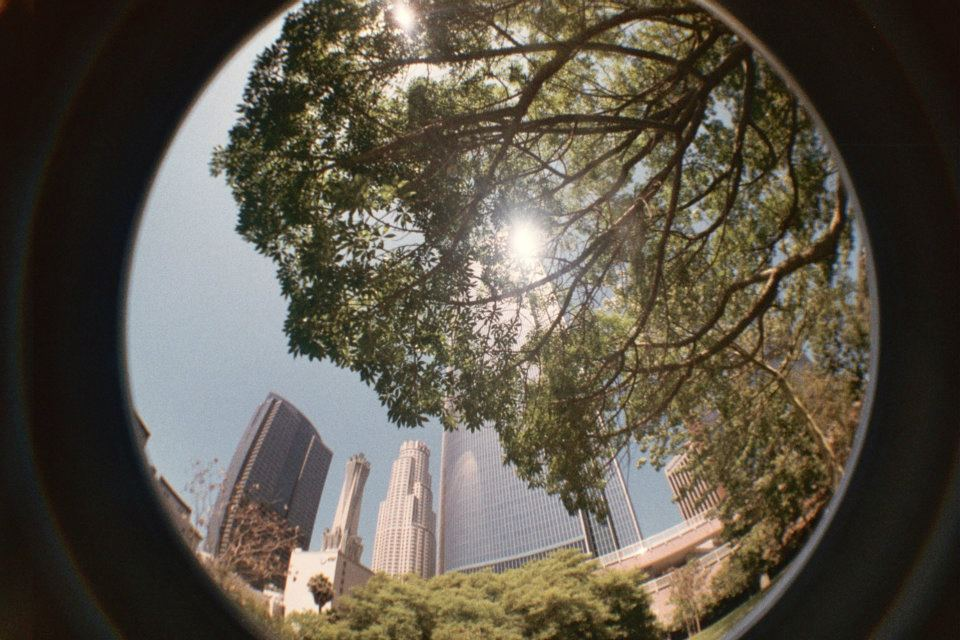
View through a fisheye lens

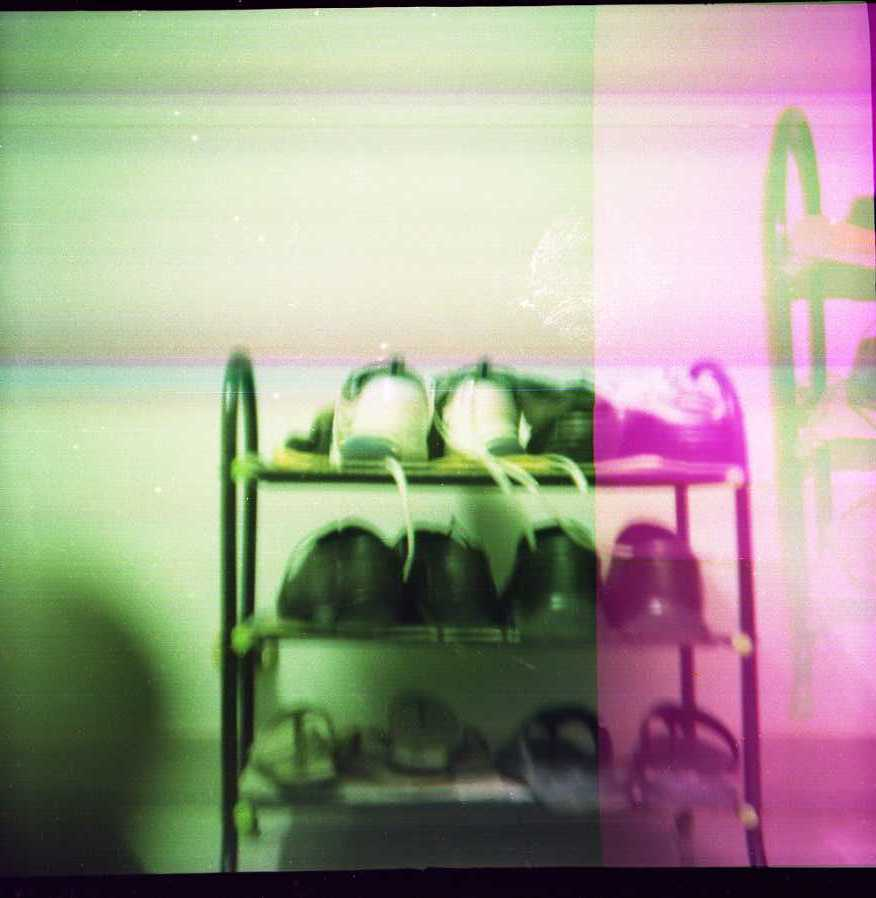
A film photograph using a colour filter

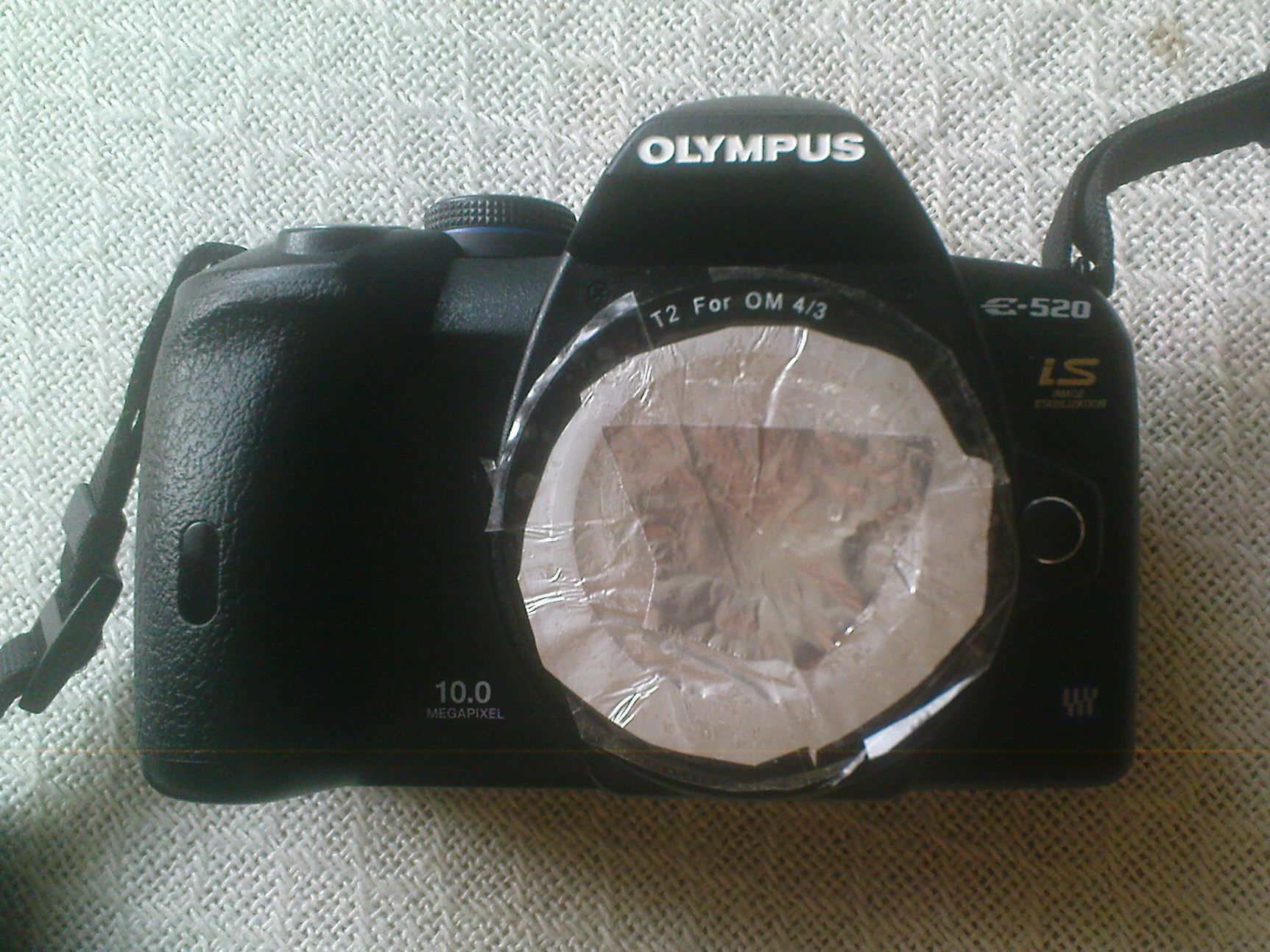
A homemade pinhole camera

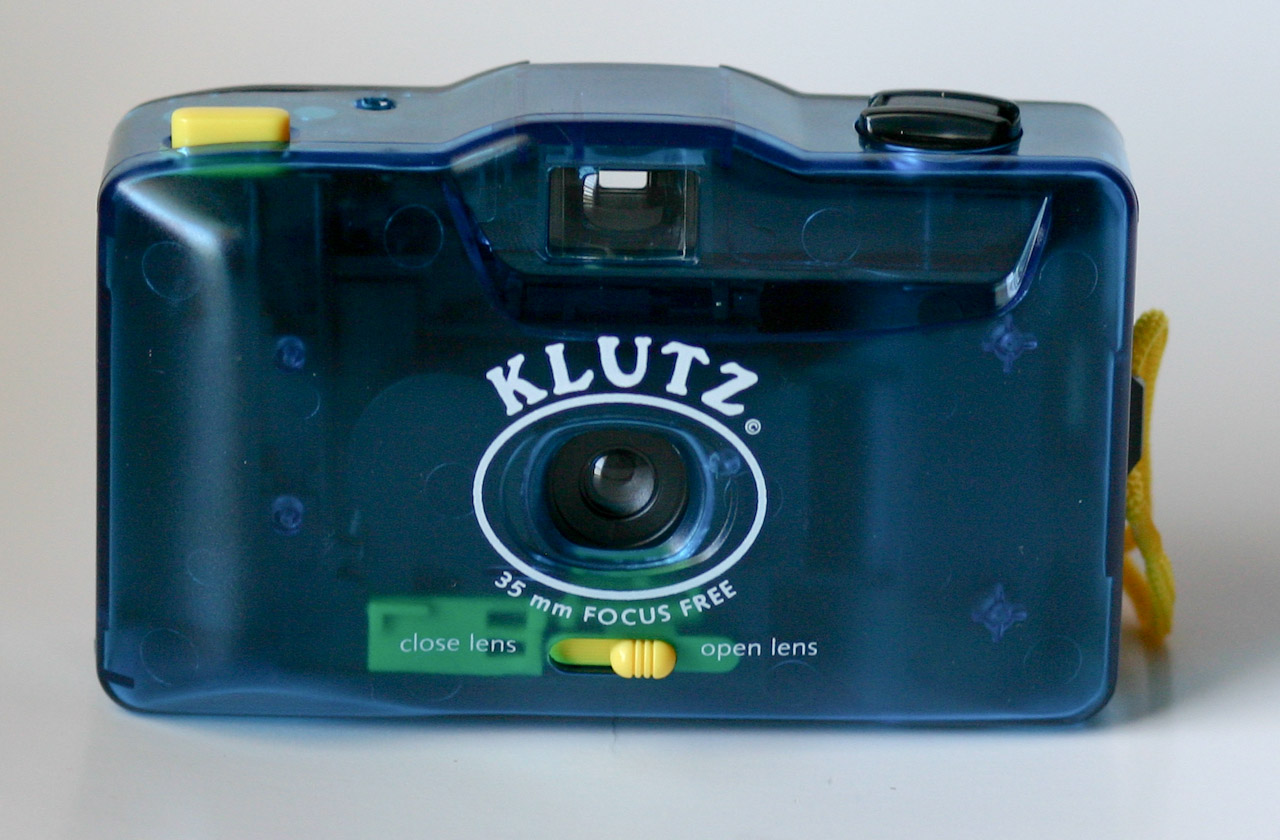
A cheap film "toy camera" with fixed focus plastic lens can be used to create lo-fi images.

A digital photograph taken with a mobile app that simulates photography with a 0.3 megapixel sensor.

== See also ==
- Lomography
- Toy camera
- Pinhole camera
- Instant camera
- Redscale
- Cross processing
- Sprocket hole photography
- Outsider art
- Wabi-sabi
