= Redscale =

Technique in film-based photography

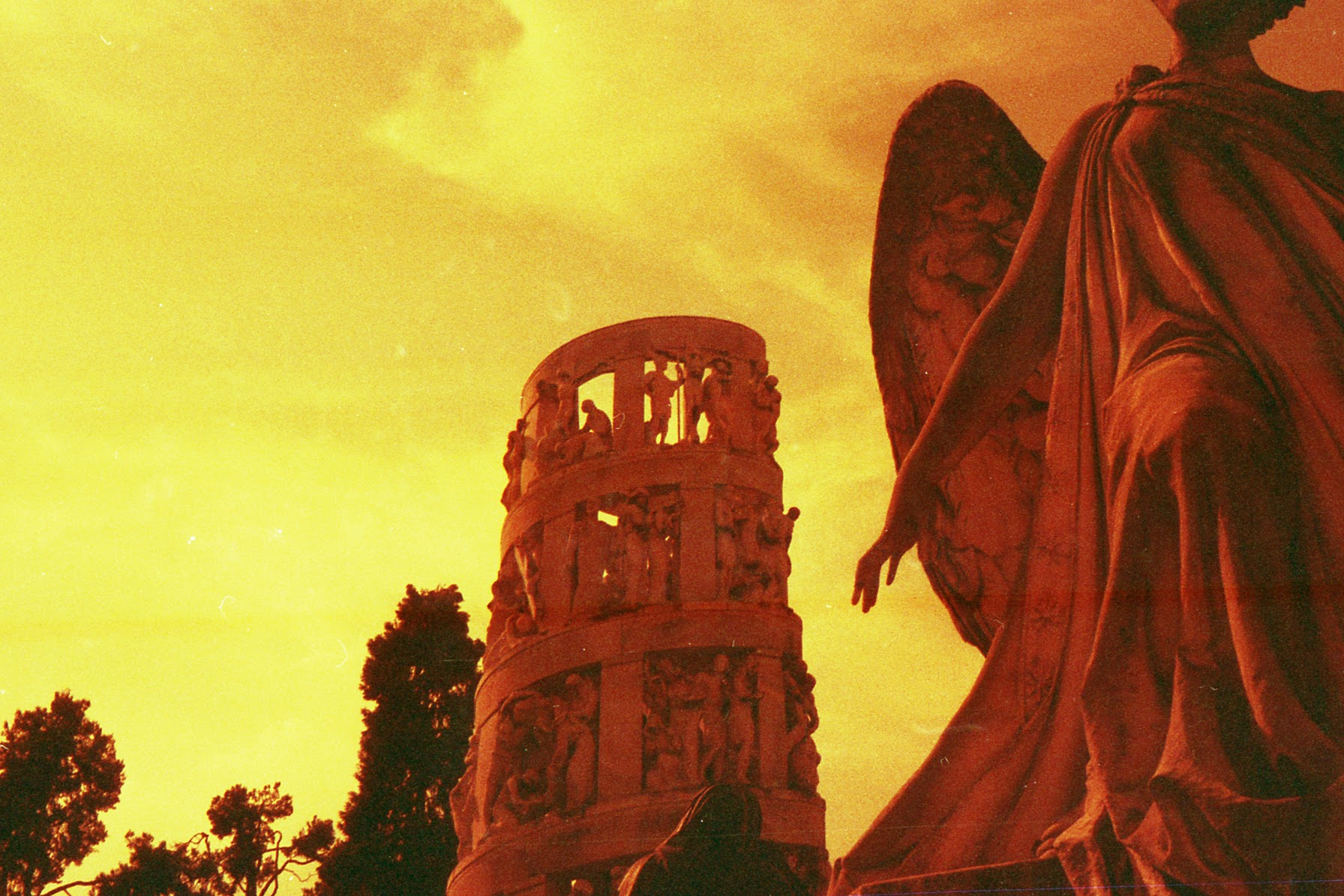
Redscale photo taken at the Cimitero Monumentale di Milano

Redscale is a technique of shooting photographic film where the film is exposed from the wrong side, i.e. the emulsion is exposed through the base of the film. Normally, this is done by winding the film upside-down into an empty film canister. The name "redscale" comes because there is a strong color shift to red due to the red-sensitive layer of the film being exposed first, rather than last (the red layer is normally the bottom layer in C-41 color print film). All layers are sensitive to blue light, so normally the blue layer is on top, followed by a filter. In this technique, blue light exposes the layers containing cyan and magenta dyes, but the layer containing yellow dye is left unexposed due to the filter. E-6 (color slide) film has also been used for this technique.

Depending on the type of film used, the resulting colors range from maroon, to red, to orange, to yellow. The amount of over exposure determines the intensity of the red. When redscale film is shot at the posted ASA the resulting photos are almost all red, over exposure allows light to reach the less sensitive green and blue layers of the film. Exposures of 5 stops or more over posted speed can result in the red layer washing out completely and the resulting images appearing mostly yellow.

== History ==
The technique seems to have been discovered accidentally. Some people shooting large format color film would load the individual negatives backwards. This phenomenon is likely as old as color film itself. Lomography Redscale was the first purpose-made redscale film, which has been available since at least 2010. Today, Lomography Redscale film is available in 35mm, 120, and 110 formats.

The technique is considered by some to be part of the lo-fi photography movement, along with use of toy cameras, pinhole cameras, instant cameras, and sprocket hole photography.

=== Greenscaling and bluescaling ===
Variants of the redscale technique have been documented with false-colour films, producing dominant colour shifts other than red. Applying the technique to Kodak Aerochrome, a discontinued colour infrared film originally designed for AR-5 processing and typically cross-processed in C-41 or E-6, produces green-dominant images, termed "greenscaling", because Aerochrome's red-sensitive layer produces green dye in development. Similarly, applying the technique to Lomochrome Turquoise, a false-colour negative film by Lomography, produces blue-dominant images, termed "bluescaling", because its colour layers do not follow the conventional order found in standard C-41 film.

== Gallery ==
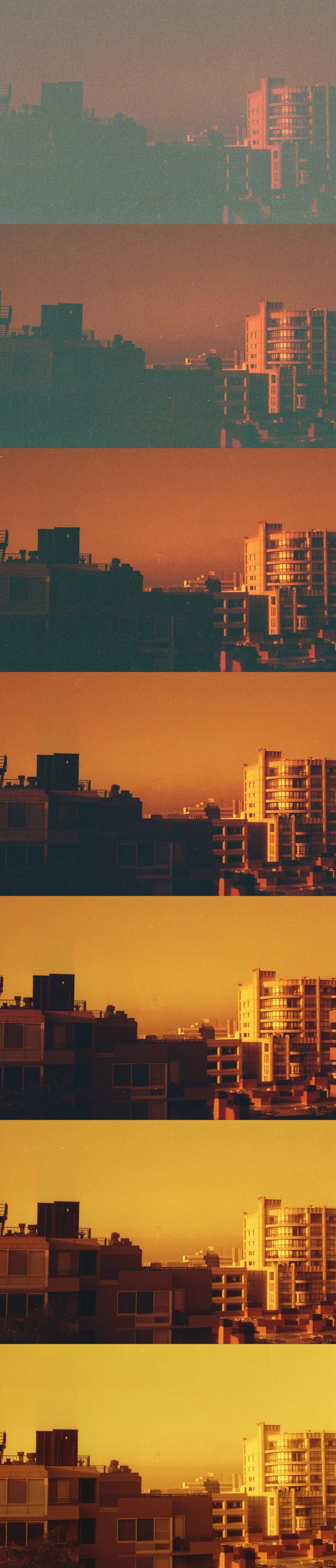
A scene shot with redscale film at 7 different exposure settings

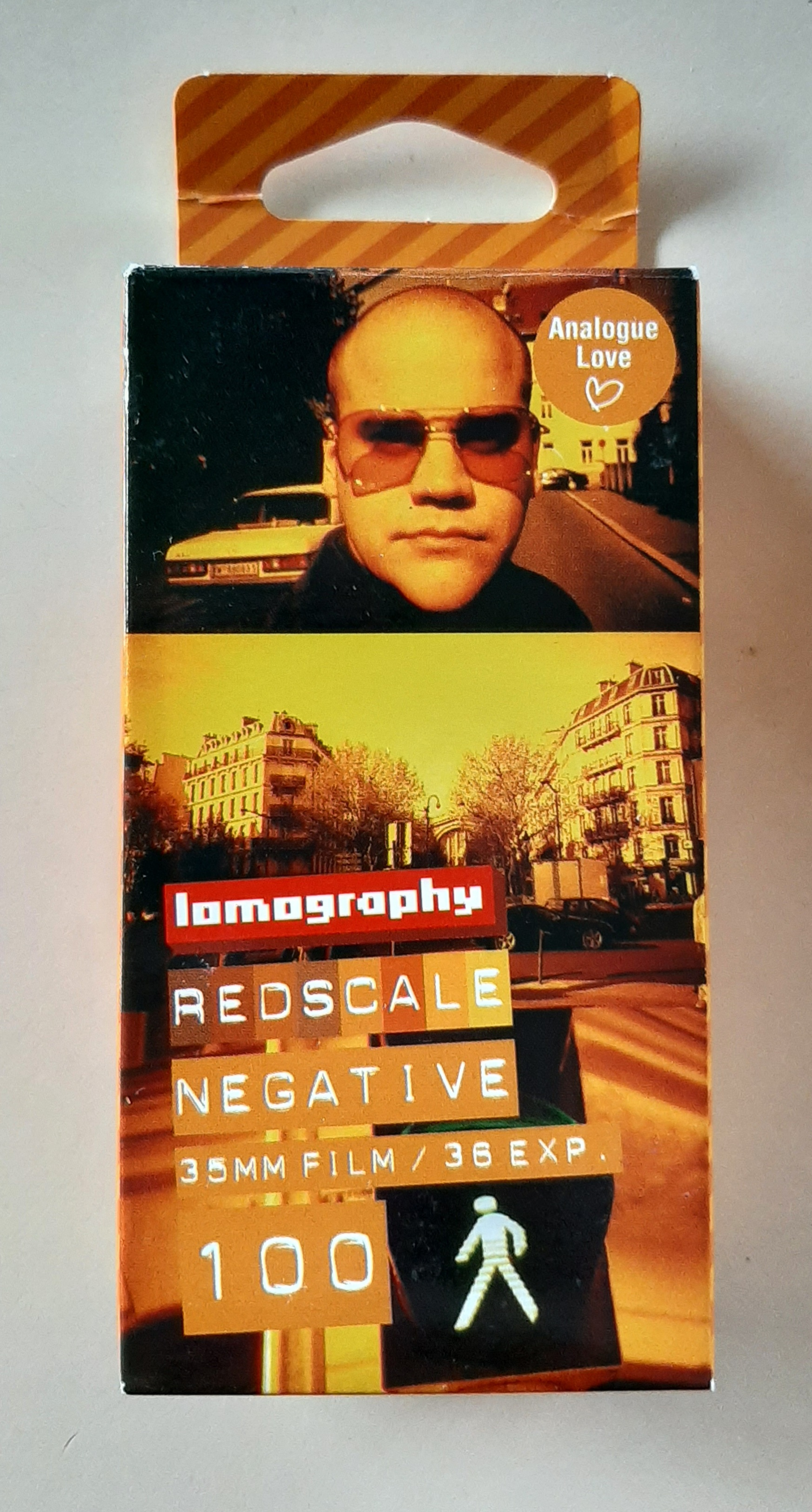
Ready-made Redscale 35mm film

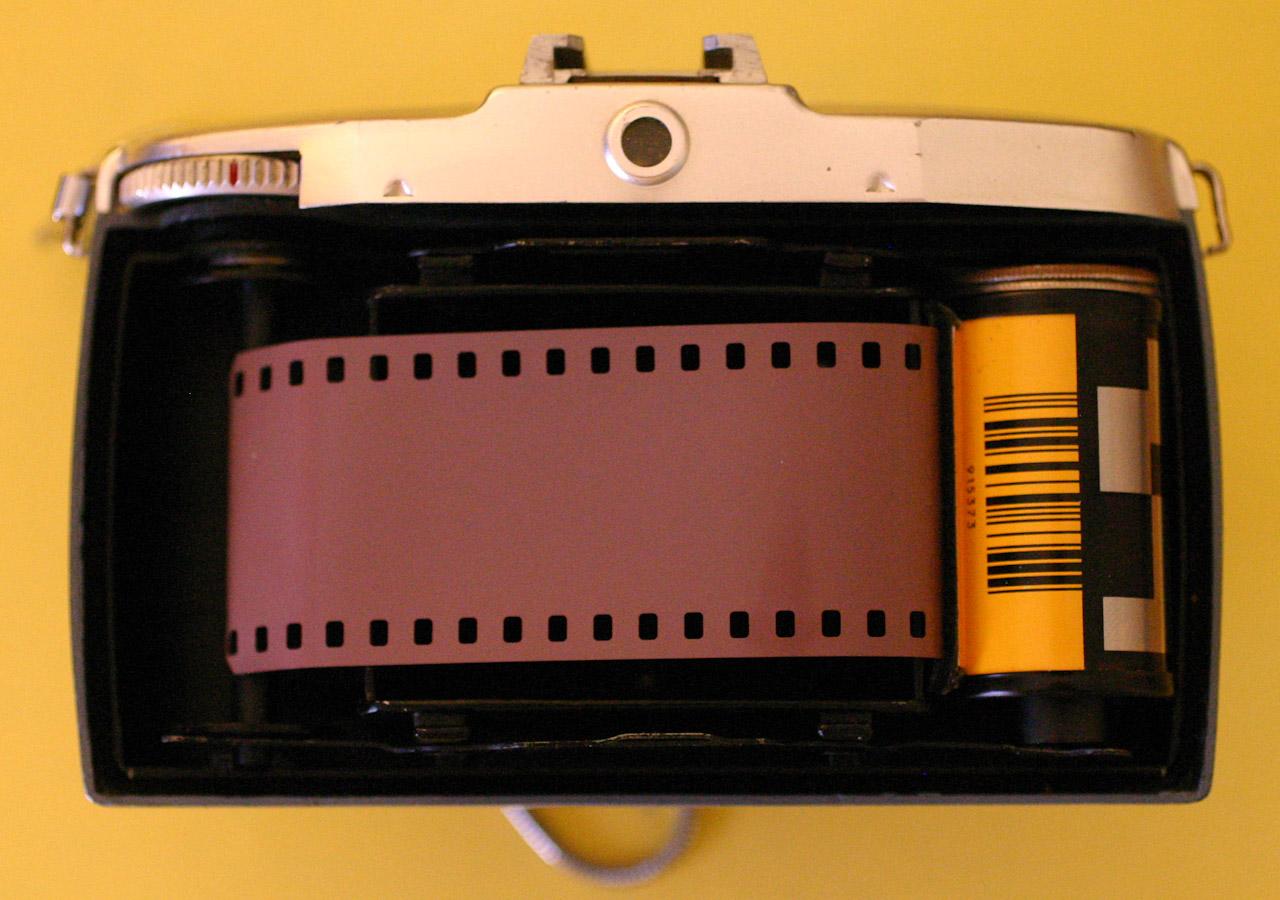
Normal film loaded backwards in a 35mm camera to achieve the redscale effect

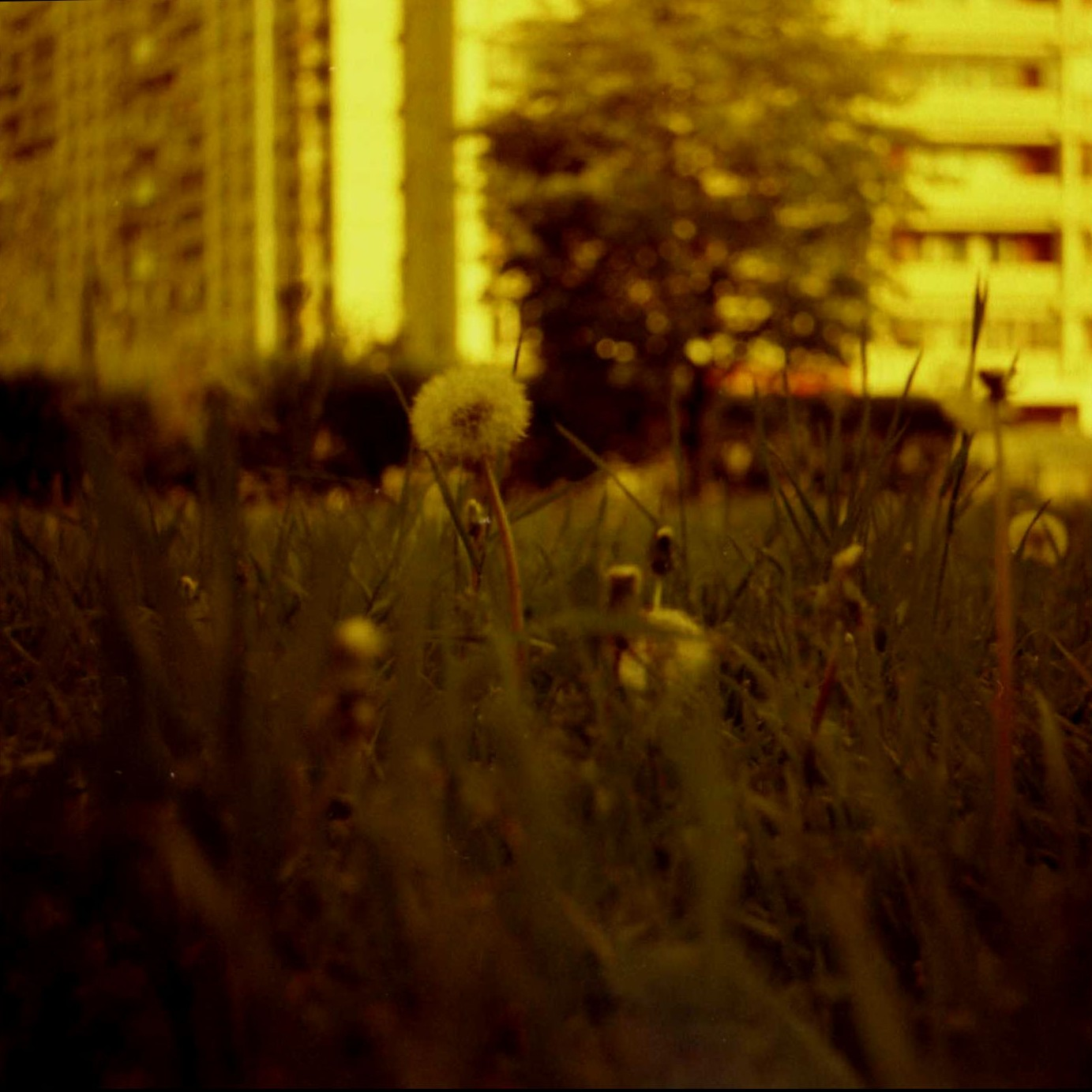
An overexposed redscale image

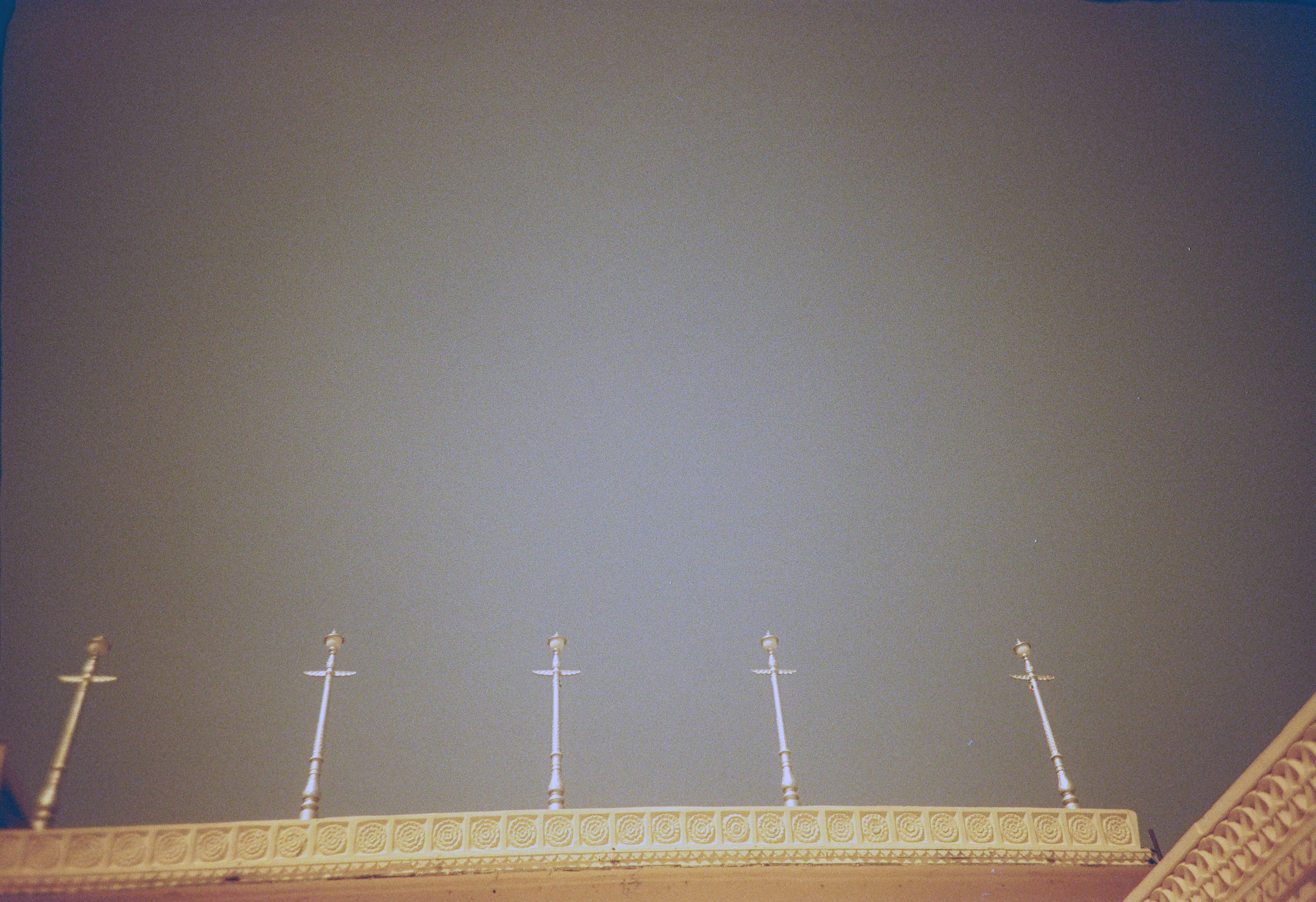
Redscale photo of clear sky

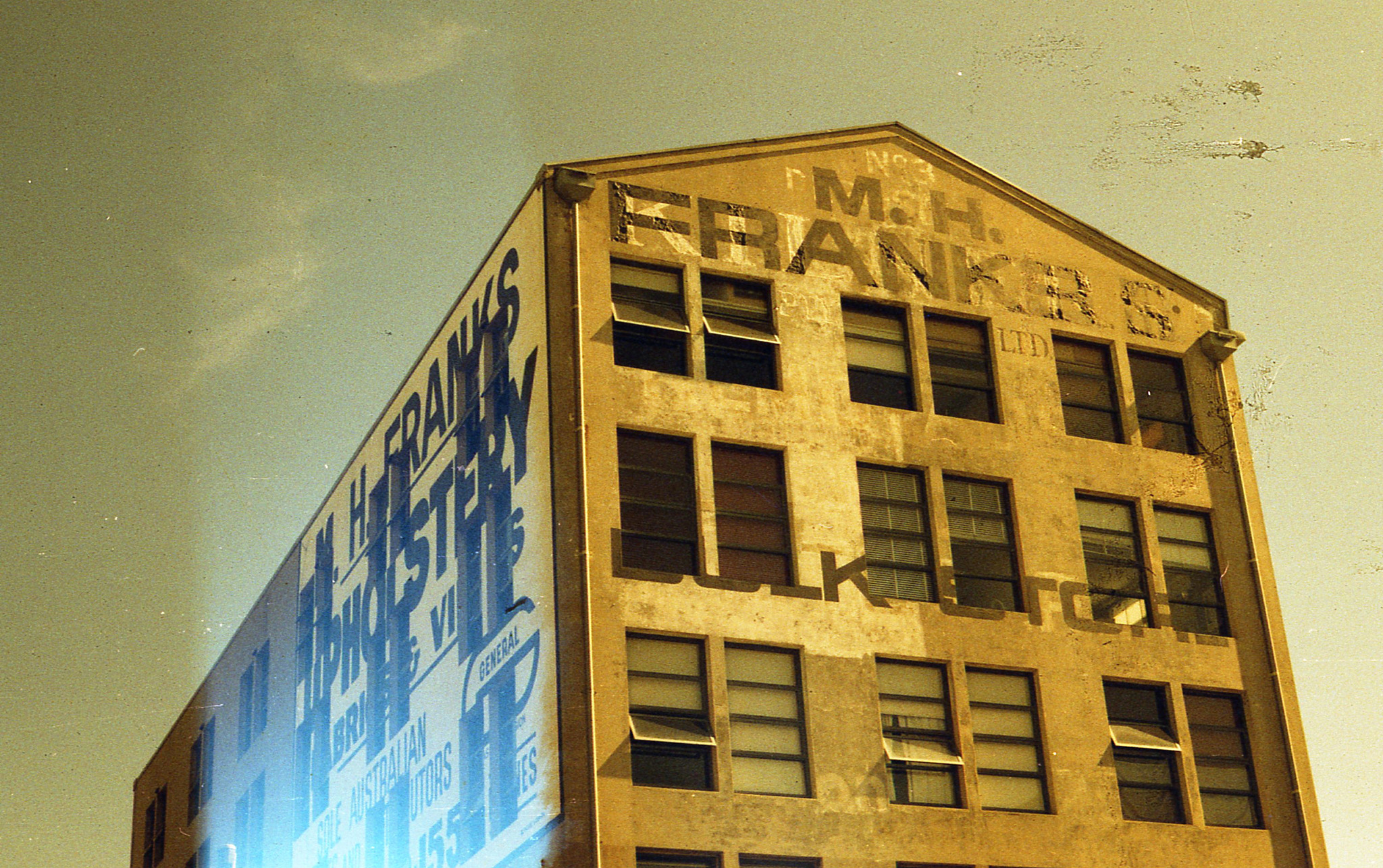
A redscale image with a light leak allowing sufficient exposure for blue colours to appear

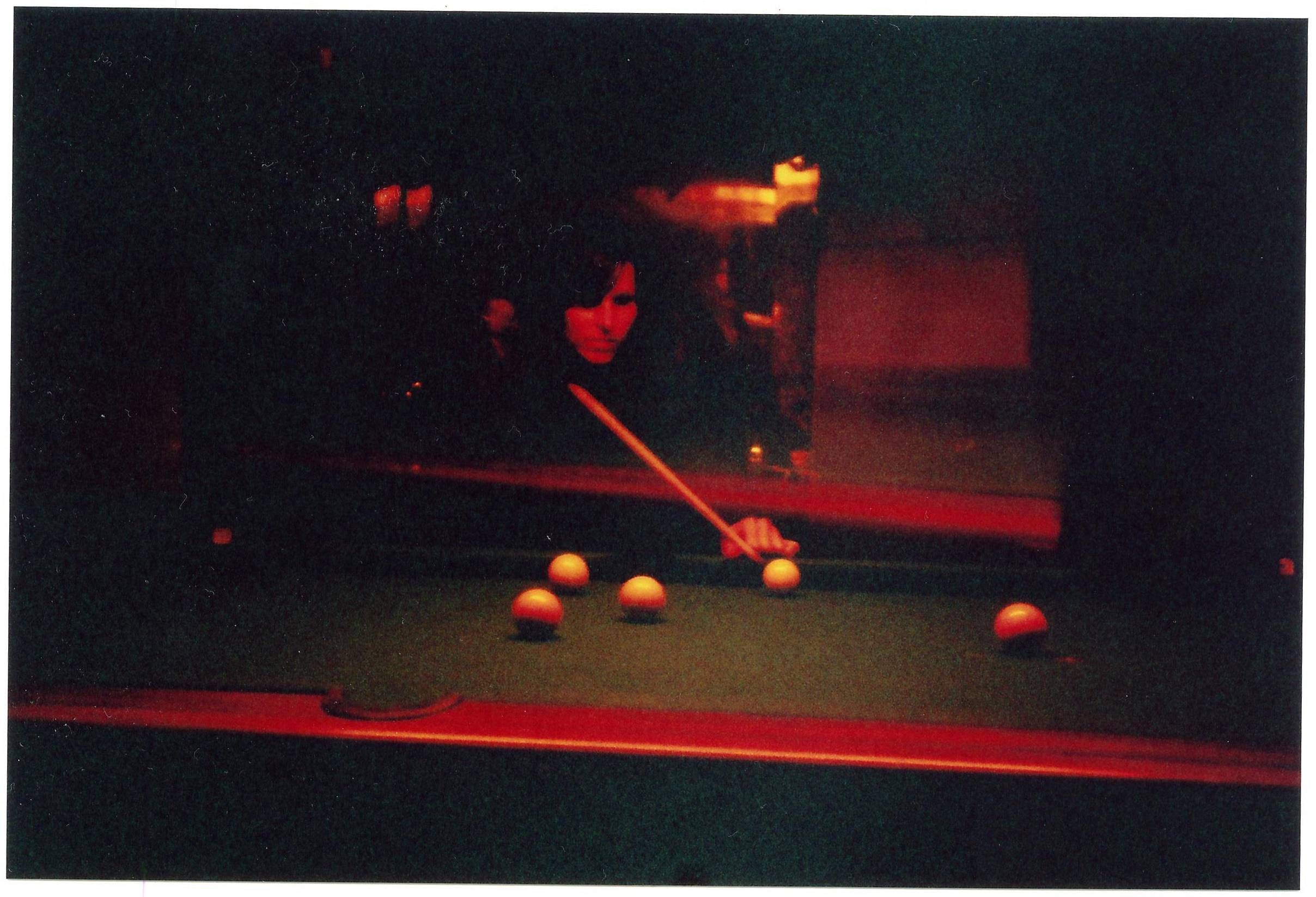
Underexposed image taken with Lomography Redscale XR film

== See also ==
- Cross processing
