= Cinematography in healthcare =

The concept of healthcare knowledge transfer using cinematography recognizes that films with carefully crafted and verified content, using graphics, animations and live-action video, can be one of the most efficient ways of transferring knowledge with clarity and speed, to both lay-people and healthcare professionals.

== History ==
=== Late 19th century ===
The use of cinematography to enhance healthcare practice and delivery dates back to the late 19th century in Western Europe. Étienne-Jules Marey (a French scientist and physiologist), Eugène-Louis Doyen (a French surgeon), Bolesław Matuszewski (a Polish cameraman, in France his first name was written as Boleslas), and Gheorghe Marinescu (a Romanian neurologist) are some of the pioneers of medical cinematography.

In 1888, Doyen had his surgeries captured on film. His films were brought into disrepute by the fact that they were copied and shown on fairgrounds. The resulting social prejudice may explain the slow take-off of medical cinematography. For example, in 1910 someone said the following regarding Doyen's videos: ,“These pictures savoured of advertisement, and were never popular, save as a side show among the less scientifically inclined members of the profession.” Doyen's work, however, marked the distinction between the concepts of ‘film for entertainment’ versus ‘film for medicine’.

In 1893, Marey used the technique to study human physiology and movement. In 1898 Boleslas Matuszewski recorded medical films in Paris (at the time, the world's neurological capital). At Salpêtrière and Pitié hospitals he filmed surgeries and cases of people affected by nervous and mental disorders.

Gheorghe Marinescu (Romanian neurologist) studied under renowned French professor Jean-Martin Charcot and returned to Bucharest as Chief Physician at Pantelimon Hospital. Between 1898 and 1902 he conducted a cinematographic project, recording and analyzing a series of neurological conditions in patients. He perfected the application of filming techniques to clinical neurology and published five articles based on cinematographic analysis. Marinescu wrote that the role of cinematography is “to complement and even replace, in whatever measure possible, the descriptive exposition of phenomena by more rigorous, more exact analysis, which consists of recording movement with the help of special procedures”

In 1905 Arthur Van Gehuchten (Belgian anatomist and neurologist) began to film neurological patients and built up a collection of films for teaching purposes. His collection is exceptional both quantitatively and qualitatively.

=== Early 20th century: medical cinematography as propaganda ===
In 1910 Thomas Edison produced the first ever public health education film, raising awareness about the prevention of tuberculosis. The view at the time was that “propagandists saw education as limited to providing facts. Propaganda was designed to control opinions and actions, without having to use direct force. Propaganda appealed to most progressive health reformers as a way of providing genuine popular democratic support for the trained medical elite.

Dr. H. E. Kleinschmidt of the Tuberculosis Association defined good propaganda as ‘mental inoculation’ whose avowed goal was ‘will-control through education’. The goal of health propagandists was not simply to inform but to persuade, to control individual thoughts and actions.”

Edison’s film came under criticism for “the distortions, exaggerations, and inaccuracies inherent in the melodrama format. The films clearly exaggerated the power of medicine to deal with tuberculosis; and they greatly over dramatized the effects and symptoms of the disease.”

During World War I, the use of medical propaganda appealed to the US government and private agencies, which worked together “to produce and distribute anti-venereal disease motion pictures, including the feature-length melodramas Fit to Fight and The End of the Road and other lesser-known films. These movies, originally made for military trainees and war workers, were revised for showing to civilians, as evidence mounted that many soldiers had been infected prior to induction.”

=== Medical cinematography employed in healthcare ===
The 1930s saw the rise of medical cinematography employed to reach the goals of public health. In 1933, the Journal of Communication published an article regarding immunization propaganda in the US: “Dr. Nash has enlisted the cinematograph film. He has noticed that American films illustrating immunization never show the instant of puncture, so that spectators are left to infer something disagreeable. But in the 16 mm. film taken by Kodak Ltd. in his own clinic the whole operation is photographed, and although now and then there may be a grimace or a hint of nervousness, there is certainly no crying or resistance. The children in the film, quite unrehearsed, behave perfectly. It is an excellent film and should do much to dispel parental apprehensions.”

In a 1935 issue of the British Medical Journal, one could read the following advice regarding the use of films in public health: “If the medical profession wanted, for example, to introduce widespread prophylaxis against diphtheria it could take a leaf out of Papworth's book and tell a story on the films that would help to wipe out diphtheria in a few years' time. It is no good trying to persuade people of the Tightness of this or that measure of health with the sweet voice of reason. It is the emotional appeal that wins the day; reason follows humbly after. The film, with its forcible assault upon both eye and ear, is a powerful weapon of propaganda. And it could be used with effect for ‘putting across’ to the public the idea of preventive medicine. Perhaps the Minister of Health, Sir Kingsley Wood, a master of propaganda, might enlist the help of the moving picture in his campaign for the improved health of the people.”

== Contemporary cinematographic use in healthcare: healthcare knowledge transfer ==
By the 1980s, medical films had become an established vehicles for both medical and patient training. A 1987 issue of the American Journal of Nursing contained a full-page section on Films & Tapes covering broad topics such as Aids to Daily Living for the elderly, working moms, AIDS, alcohol abuse and even emotional fitness.

Today, the concept of healthcare knowledge transfer recognizes that film clips (with verified content, and using graphics, animations and live-action video), can be an efficient way of transferring knowledge with clarity and speed, to both lay-people (patients, families, and friends), and healthcare professionals.

Traditionally the transfer of generic information (i.e. non patient-specific information) tends to happen on a somewhat ad-hoc, live, one-to-one basis, that is generally less well structured, less comprehensive, and thus less successful (whilst also being more expensive and less time efficient).

However, in order to be efficient and effective, the quality of the film's content must be high. A patient's understanding of conditions and treatments is important to their care and well-being, so it is useful for carefully crafted clips to be available 24/7. It also helps patients when attending one-to-one consultations. If patients are better informed and better prepared they can focus on their case rather than generic issues.

The literature in this area also contains examples of what can happen when the film content is not particularly well crafted and presented. In 2000, a UK cancer study highlighted the impact of poor-quality video. The authors acknowledge that “not all randomised trials of video education, however, have had similarly consistent results. A randomised trial in patients undergoing colonoscopy reported increased knowledge and satisfaction but failed to demonstrate a reduction in anxiety. A similar study in patients receiving genetic counseling reported similar benefits but again no reduction in anxiety. Two further randomised trials, the first in patients having breast surgery and the second in patients undergoing coronary angioplasty, failed to show any improvement in satisfaction or anxiety. The variation in these trial results suggests that, like all educational materials, the quality of the content is paramount and how it is used is vital to success. Involving patients in the development and showing patients recounting their personal experience undoubtedly helps. Using respected TV personalities offers the familiar face of respectability and professionalism. Above all, most studies fail to take advantage of the role which video has to play in continuing the educational process at home with their carers and friends, but instead ask patients to watch it in the unfamiliar environment of the clinic.”

With the widespread use of the internet since the late 1990s, there is potential for health-related films to be made available, free at the point of need, over the internet. The 21st century has seen an expanding integration of social media and mobile devices into daily life, enabling a wider adoption of film-based health knowledge transfer.

== Case studies of healthcare knowledge transfer via cinematography ==
A recent slate of long-form films includes ‘Outreach’ - a film about the workings of a specialist spinal injury unit, [h The Spinal Injury Patient Film], an award-winning film for new patients with spinal cord injuries, Choosing a Wheelchair, a film about the correct protocol of wheelchair assessment and procurement for individual patients, and several films on cancer survivorship.

=== Choosing a wheelchair: a case study in the UK ===
The 55-minute production is set to help improve well-being and long-term outcomes for Britain's 1.2 million wheelchair users. Too many people do not understand the importance of getting the right wheelchair; the right set-up and support, and the appropriate pressure relief. UK provision is patchy, indeed there is - surprisingly - no qualification requirement for a wheelchair services provider/specifier in the National Health Service (NHS).

The film includes experts and practitioners in this area, plus case studies, and also an introductory history of the wheelchair. It thus provides an overview of practice and assessment, and is supported by many voices of experience. For the NHS, the long-term cost benefits of proper provision in an aging population are very considerable.

=== Spinal injury patient film ===
Newly injured spinal cord injury (SCI) patients are anxious about what is happening to them and the related long-term implications. When a patient is admitted to hospital with an SCI it is traumatic for their family, friends and loved ones too. One challenge faced by clinicians is communicating with a patient's ‘advocates’, people who may know little of spinal cord injury, the care process, nor the problems of prognosis. They may be understandably overwhelmed, they want answers... “doctor, will he/she walk again?”.

Inspired by patient feedback, award-winning director Marcus Dillistone, has created the film “From Darkness Into Light”], to help explain the core issues with SCI and to provide patient insight. The film is designed not to replace face-to-face discussion, but to complement it.

The film was conceived as a ‘prescriptive’ communications tool in hospitals, with the decision of when (and if) to introduce the film to the patient or their advocates being made by the clinical team.

=== Cancer survivorship films ===
When a person is diagnosed with cancer, treatment is often the focus of discussion among patients, health care providers and family. However, the next phase of care, cancer survivorship, is much less discussed. The 2005 Institute of Medicine (IOM) report “From Cancer Patient to Cancer Survivor: Lost in Transition” raised awareness of the issue. Survivors of cancer face unique challenges, while health care providers do not always have the time, resources and training to provide counseling and assistance.

A 2005 randomized controlled study, Moving Beyond Cancer Trial, showed that a peer-modeling video as a psychoeducation tool is more effective than print materials in the recovery of energy/vitality in post-treatment breast cancer patients. This 23-minute film, now available on the National Cancer Institute website, addressed re-entry challenges in four life domains: physical health, emotional well-being, interpersonal relations, and life perspectives. Designed to promote adaptive peer modeling, the film observes four breast cancer survivors as they describe their experience in each of the four domains, as well as the active coping skills they used to meet associated challenges. The film also includes commentary by an oncologist expert in breast cancer on the re-entry experience and on active methods for approaching problems during re-entry.

Since then, many video resources have been made available on the internet to cancer survivors and their care providers. Examples include a general education video on the issues of cancer survivorship produced by the IOM, a video series by Living Beyond Breast Cancer, a national education and support organization, addressing specific and sometimes sensitive issues during breast cancer survivorship.
