= Marisa Weiss =

Marisa C. Weiss is an American oncologist, living in Philadelphia, the founder and president of Breastcancer.org, which provides medical and personal information on breast health and breast cancer. She is also a founder and past president of the national nonprofit Living Beyond Breast Cancer.

She currently practices at Lankenau Medical Center, part of the Main Line Health Hospitals of the Thomas Jefferson University Health System in the Philadelphia area, where she serves as director of breast radiation oncology and director of breast health outreach. She served on the National Cancer Institute Director’s Consumer Liaison Group for seven years.

Weiss is the author of four books about breast cancer and breast health, published by Random House. Her Think Pink, Live Green project, a global breast cancer prevention initiative, has been promoted by Breastcancer.org since 2008.

Weiss has been a repeat guest on ABC’s Good Morning America, NBC’s TODAY, CNN’s medical features, and The Dr. Oz Show, among others. Weiss has appeared in women’s magazines, including Elle, Self, Redbook, Marie Claire, Seventeen, Cosmopolitan, Good Housekeeping, The Oprah Magazine, and Better Homes and Gardens. Her books and other work has been quoted in a number of publications on the subject of breast cancer.

== Books ==
Weiss is the author of Living Beyond Breast Cancer and Living Well Beyond Breast Cancer (According to WorldCat, this book is in 945 libraries), coauthored with her mother, Ellen Weiss (1998, 2010); Taking Care of Your “Girls:” A Breast Health Guide for Girls, Teens, and In-Betweens, coauthored with her daughter, Isabel Friedman (2008); and 7 Minutes!: How to Get the Most from Your Doctor Visit (2007).

== See also ==
- Nina Montée Karp
