= The Four Troublesome Heads =

The Four Troublesome Heads Four Heads Are Better Than One
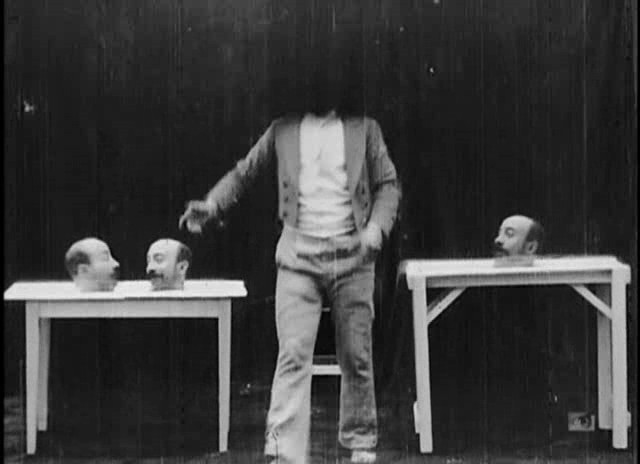
- French: Un homme de têtes
- Directed by: Georges Méliès
- Written by: Georges Méliès
- Starring: Georges Méliès
- Release date: 1898
- Running time: About 50 seconds 65 feet (20 metres)
- Country: France
- Language: Silent

The Four Troublesome Heads (French: Un homme de têtes, literally "A Man of Heads"), also known as Four Heads Are Better Than One, is an 1898 French silent trick film directed by Georges Méliès.

== Plot ==
A surviving print of the film

A magician enters the frame and stands between two tables. He removes his own head and puts it on one of the tables, where it starts talking and looking around. The magician repeats the action twice, with a new head appearing on his shoulders each time, until four identical heads are presented at once. The magician then plays a banjo, and all four heads sing along. He then bashes two of the heads with his banjo over their obnoxious singing, making them disappear. He then takes off his head and tosses it aside before taking the other head from the second table, tossing it in the air and it lands back onto his neck. He bows to the viewers, bids them farewell and then strolls off.

== Production ==
Méliès himself plays the magician in the film, which takes advantage of his sense of rhythm, his tendency for elegant gestural movements, and his talent for mime. The Four Troublesome Heads features one of the first known uses of multiple exposure of objects on a black background on film, a special effect Méliès went on to use prolifically. It also marks the first known time Méliès filmed living heads or other body parts separated from the rest of the body, which would become a favourite motif of his. Here, the trick was handled using substitution splices and four separate exposures.

== Release and reception ==
The film was released by Méliès's Star Film Company and is numbered 167 in its catalogues. An illegal print of the film, copied without authorization from Méliès, was released in America in 1903 by Siegmund Lubin under the title Four Heads Are Better Than One. Film critic William B. Parrill, reviewing silent films in the 2010s, called it "doubtless a wonder when it appeared, the first of a wonderful comic line which produced not only detachable body parts but also the replication of any number of magical reproductions of [Méliès's] own image."
