= Living Beyond Breast Cancer =

American nonprofit organization

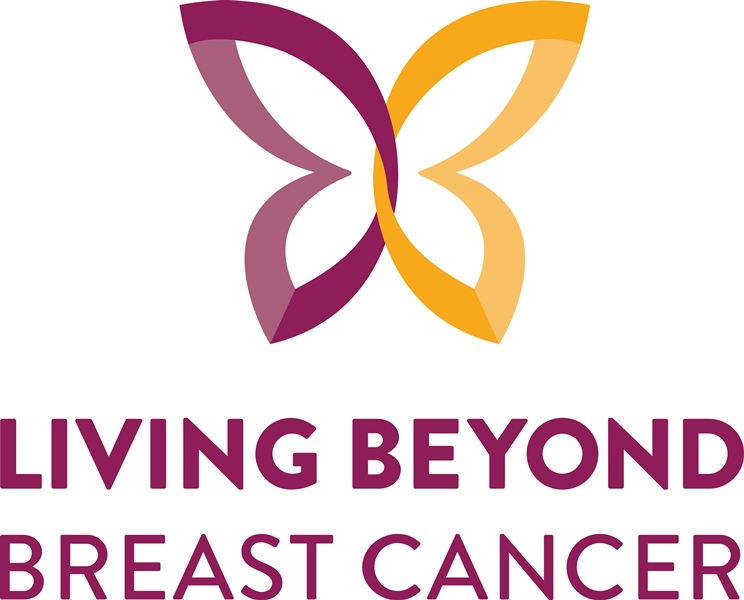
- Abbreviation: LBBC
- Formation: 1991
- Purpose: To connect people with trusted breast cancer information and a community of support.
- Headquarters: 40 Monument Rd., Ste. 140; Bala Cynwyd, PA 19004
- Chief Executive Officer: Jean A. Sachs, MSS, MLSP
- Website: www.lbbc.org

Living Beyond Breast Cancer (LBBC), is a national 501(c)(3) nonprofit organization headquartered in Bala Cynwyd, just outside Philadelphia, Pennsylvania, in the United States. LBBC works with women who have been diagnosed with breast cancer and their caregivers throughout their experience of diagnosis, treatment and recovery. Their goal to be a "high-touch organization" that provides people with information and support of relevance to their personal experience of breast cancer. The organization supports studies of health care that are sensitive to issues of ethnicity, age, sexual orientation, and diagnosis.

== History ==
External media

Audio
- “Jean Sachs, CEO, Living Beyond Breast Cancer”, May 9, 2016, WBEN-FM

Video
- “Living Beyond Breast Cancer: Reach & Raise Reveal”, Living Beyond Breast Cancer
- “Body & Soul”, Living Beyond Breast Cancer

Living Beyond Breast Cancer was founded in 1991 by radiation oncologist Marisa Weiss. She is a past president of the organization. Early on, Weiss ran the organization from her house, with the help of volunteers.

The organization's first executive director, Jean A. Sachs, was appointed in 1996. She became CEO of the organization in 2008. Under her direction, the organization's budget and staffing expanded from an initial budget of $100,000 per year to more than $5 million per year as of 2014.

== Programs ==
LBBC reaches out to more than 70,000 people in need of information and support each year. They provide a wide range of programs and services. The organization's website (lbbc.org) offers comprehensive educational information. Information is kept up-to-date through the work of a national medical advisory board with sixty representatives. The organization also operates a Breast Cancer Helpline (1-888-753-5222). Volunteers in the organization's outreach program are often former patients themselves. A small number of Cis B. Golder Quality of Life Grants are awarded to provide financial assistance and support services to people diagnosed with breast cancer in the Philadelphia area.

LBBC has actively supported studies of the experience of cancer in ethnic and racial minority groups and the development of materials for their use. Publications include Getting Connected: African-Americans Living Beyond Breast Cancer by Patricia K. Bradley and Celebramos el Mañana: Latinas que Sobreviven el Cáncer del Seno / We Celebrate Tomorrow: Latinas Living Beyond Breast Cancer by Aracely Rosales.

LBBC has also published Breast Cancer in Focus: Getting the Care You Need as a Lesbian, Gay or Bisexual Person (2015). It is particularly important for LGBT women to be aware of possible issues, both because lesbians have a higher risk of breast cancer, and because LGBT individuals and families may face discrimination.

LBBC works with populations of young women. They have received funding from the Centers for Disease Control and Prevention (CDC) to support needs assessment and outreach in this area. They have partnered with the Young Survival Coalition in organizing events such as "C4YW" (formerly the "Conference for Young Women Affected by Breast Cancer").

Providing accurate information to young women and connecting them to trusted resources is critically important. It is also vital to educate the public about the impact breast cancer has on young women." Jean Sachs, CEO of LBBC, 2014

The organization is a member of the Metastatic Breast Cancer Alliance, and organizes annual conferences specifically for MBC patients and their caregivers. In 2005, LBBC secured funding for the Silent Voices: Advanced (Metastatic) Breast Cancer Needs Assessment Survey (2006), an important first step in identifying concerns specific to women with Stage IV breast cancer.

In 2013–2014, LBBC carried out the first needs assessment of women diagnosed with triple-negative breast cancer (TNBC). Approximately 10–20 percent of breast cancers are triple-negative, with a higher prevalence (30%) among African-American women. Young Hispanic women, premenopausal women, and women who test positive for the BRCA1 gene mutation, also have a higher prevalence of TNBC diagnosis. The study found that TNBC-diagnosed women had a greater interest in finding diagnosis-specific resources. It also found a greater degree of fear, anxiety, and worry among TNBC women than among those with other cancer diagnoses.

LBBC has collaborated with photographer Jean Karotkin, to develop an online exhibition expanding on her book of photographs of cancer survivors, Body & Soul (2004). The book sought to "celebrate and chronicle the beauty, power and spirit of women affected by breast cancer." LBBC has created a digital archive where Karotkin's portraits, and stories of the women she photographed, will be accessible to people from around the world.

== Fundraising events ==
A signature fundraising event for Living Beyond Breast Cancer is its outdoor yoga event, held the third Sunday in May. Yoga was chosen as the focus of the event because of medical research suggesting that yoga has a positive effect on the quality of life of cancer patients. The event involves a one-hour yoga class held at the Philadelphia Museum of Art. This is followed by breakfast and a health and fitness information Expo for participants and supporters, featuring a variety of nonprofits and service organizations. It was first organized in 2002 by Jean Sachs and yoga instructor Jennifer Schelter. In 2002, 100 attendees met in the rain. In 2015, the program attracted over 2,300 attendees in Philadelphia, as well as participants in other cities including Washington, D.C., Kansas City, Denver and Fort Myers. Known variously as "Yoga Unites for Living Beyond Breast Cancer", "Yoga 4 Living Beyond Breast Cancer;", and "Yoga on the Steps", the event was renamed "Reach & Raise" for 2016. In support of the event, the City of Philadelphia has declared May 16, 2010, May 15, 2011, and other dates as "Living Beyond Breast Cancer Day" in Philadelphia.

Another regular fundraising event is the annual Butterfly Ball, during National Breast Cancer Awareness Month. A variety of researchers, health care providers and volunteers have been honored at the event. Recent honorees include researcher Patricia K. Bradley, diagnostic radiologist Debbi Copit, and cancer awareness advocate Tyesha K. Love.

In 2005, LBBC partnered with Goody in "Comfort Meets Cause," to expand public awareness about breast cancer and raise funds for breast cancer education. Goody sold special pink Goody hairbrushes, donating four percent of the proceeds to LBBC. Celebrities including Salma Hayek, Kim Cattrall and Kelly Ripa autographed hairbrushes for sale at auction, all proceeds of which were donated to LBBC.

== Awards ==
Since 2005, LBBC has been in receipt of Charity Navigator's highest overall rating of four stars. LBBC has consistently received Charity Navigator's highest 4-star ratings for sound fiscal management ("Financial Rating", since 2005) and accountability and transparency (since 2012).

Jean Sachs was named "Breast Cancer National Leader of the Year" for 2014 by Breast Cancer Wellness Magazine in recognition of her work with LBBC.

LBBC has received national recognition for the quality of its educational programs. Getting Connected won an Award for Excellence in Patient Education Materials from the American Academy of Family Physicians.
