= Cross processing =

Procedure of deliberately processing photographic film

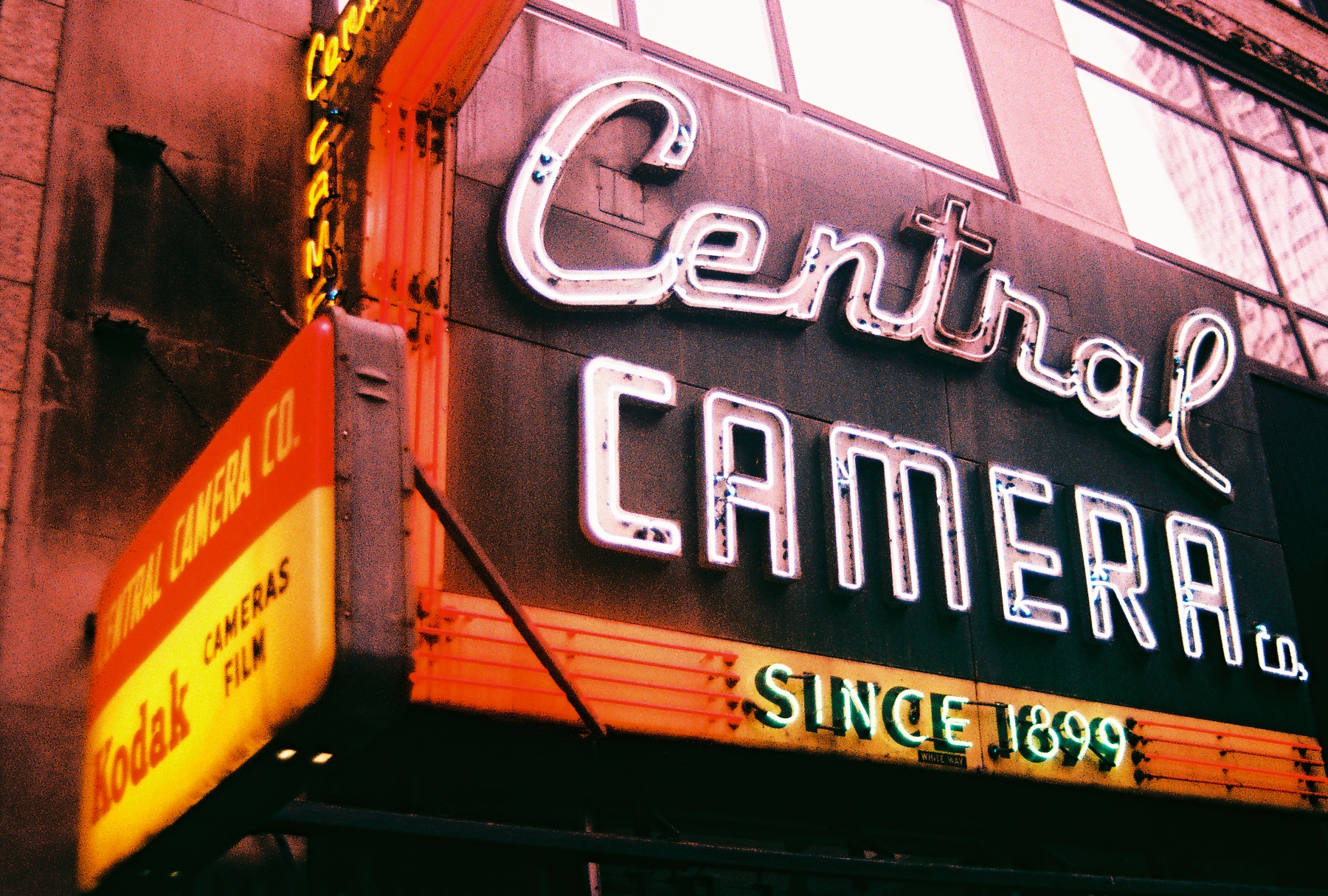
Fuji Sensia slide film cross processed with C-41 chemistry

Cross processing (sometimes abbreviated to Xpro, or hyphenated as Cross-processing) is the deliberate processing of photographic film in a chemical solution intended for a different type of film. The effect was discovered independently by many different photographers often by mistake in the days of C-22 and E-4. Color cross processed photographs are often characterized by unnatural colors and high contrast. The results of cross processing differ from case to case, as the results are determined by many factors such as the make and type of the film used, the amount of light exposed onto the film and the chemical used to develop the film. Cross processing has been used in a variety of photographic and cinematographic practices, most notably rising in popularity during the 1990s. Similar effects can also be achieved with digital filter effects.

== Processes ==
=== Analogue ===
Cross processing usually involves one of the two following methods.

- Processing positive color reversal film in C-41 chemicals, resulting in a negative image on a colorless base.
- Processing negative color print film in E-6 chemicals, resulting in a positive image but with the orange base of a normally processed color negative.

However, cross processing can take other forms, such as negative color print film or positive color reversal film in black and white developer. After the K-14 process was discontinued in 2010, cross processing in black and white is the only way to develop Kodachrome. Another form of cross-processing involves processing ECN-2 motion picture film in C-41 still picture chemistry, although doing so requires removal of the remjet layer before processing. This results in higher contrast than normal, but without any effect on the colors.

The results of cross processing differ from case to case, as the results are determined by many factors such as the make and type of the film used, the amount of light exposed onto the film and the chemical used to develop the film.

=== Digital ===
Cross processing effects can be simulated in digital photography by a number of techniques involving the manipulation of contrast/brightness, hue/saturation and curves. However, these digital tools lack the unpredictable nature of regular cross processed images. These digital techniques are most often executed in photo editing programs such as Photoshop, but can also be reproduced through filters in apps such as Instagram or VSCO.

== Cross processing in artistic practice ==
Cross processing was most prominently used in fashion photography in the 1990s. Some notable pioneers of the fashion photography craze include Nick Knight and Anton Corbijn.

Cross processing has been used as a cinematography technique in various movies beginning in the 1990s. Some of these movies include Clockers, U-Turn, and Get on the Bus. Newton Thomas Sigel, who used the technique for the "Demon-Vision" sequences in Fallen, noted in a 1999 interview that "working with cross-processed film is a tricky thing", and that it is more difficult than working with still photographs.

== Popular reception ==
It is overall unclear when cross processing became a prominent technique, with some believing that it began to rise in popularity in the early 1970s. By 1995, the technique was best known for its use in fashion photography. The rise in popularity is occasionally attributed to being an act of rebellion against the rise of digital photography, as cross processing was a very manual process that left much to chance. When cross-processing became more commonly used in the 1990s, development labs that offered the service for film were sparse due to film companies considering it to be a conflict of interest to process film using a competitor's technique. However, a major consequence of the rise of digital photography was that custom film labs that provided analogue cross processing began to shut down, and by the end of the 1990s cross processing fell out of popularity.

=== Gallery ===
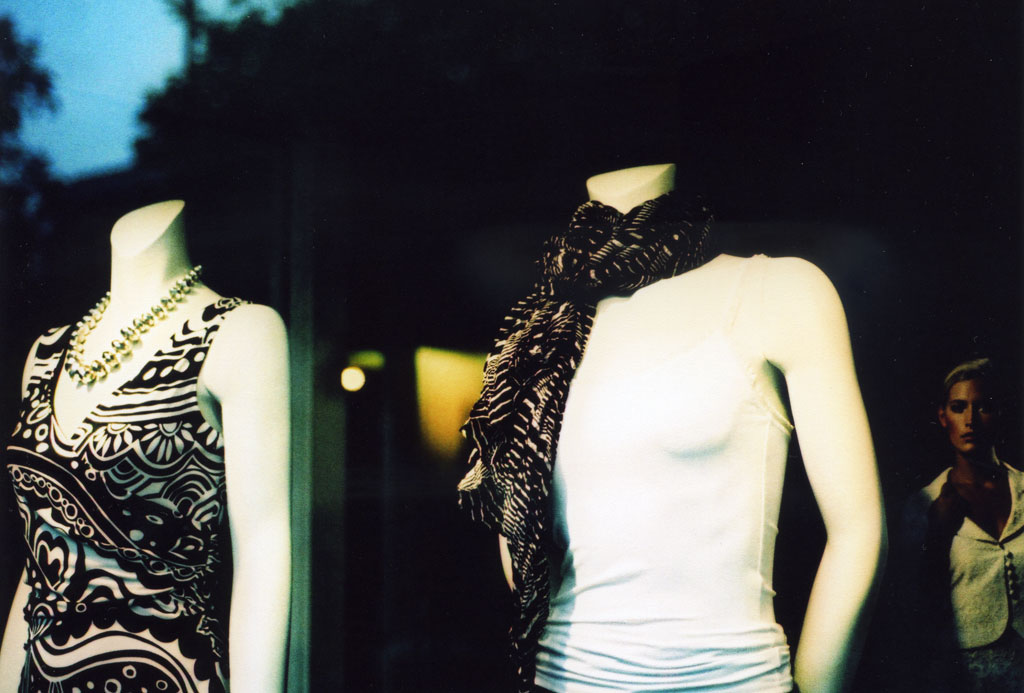
Agfa CT Precisa 100 film, shot at EI 80 then cross processed with C-41 chemistry

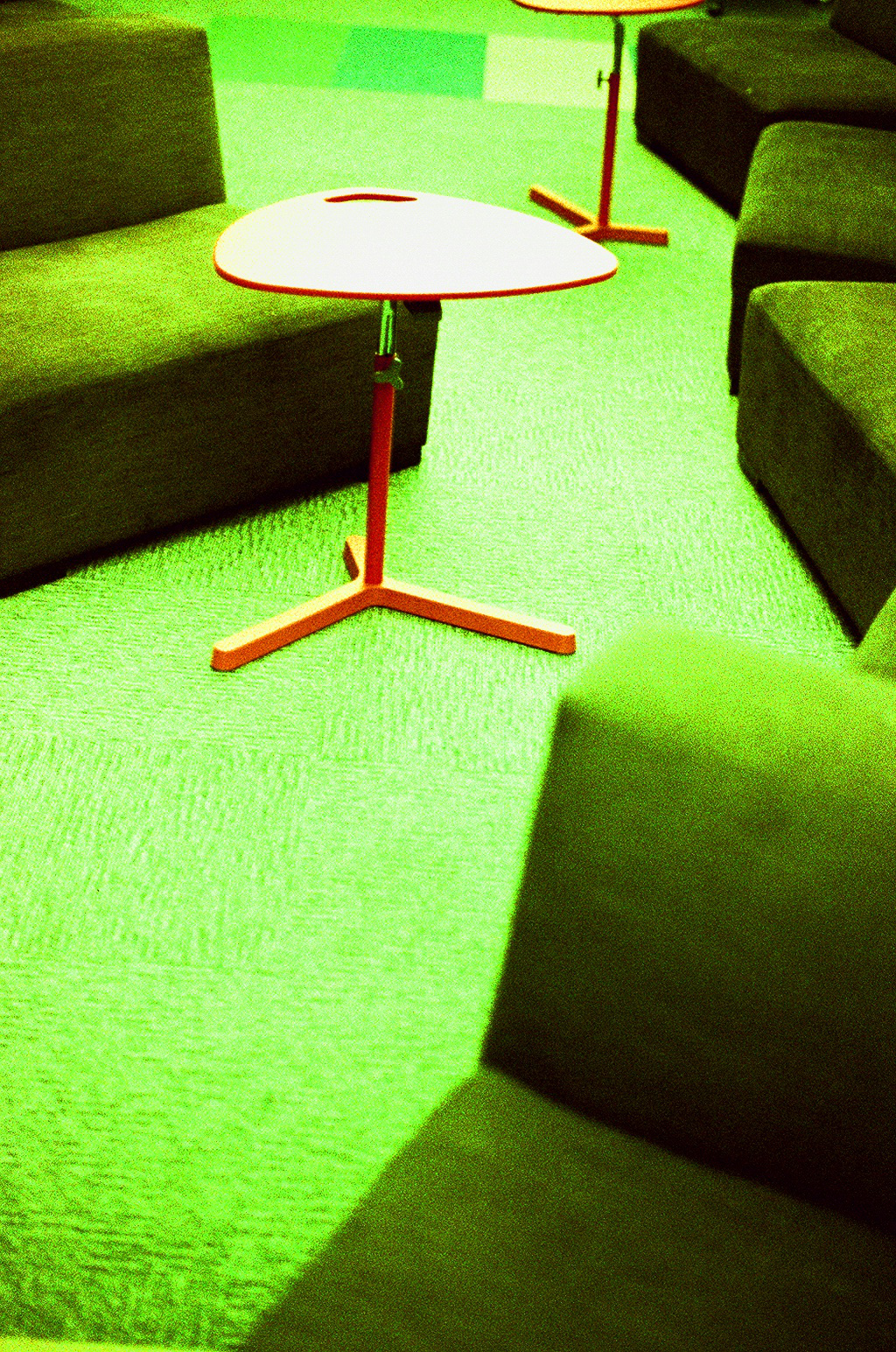
200 ISO Lomography Slide/Xpro film, processed with C-41 chemistry

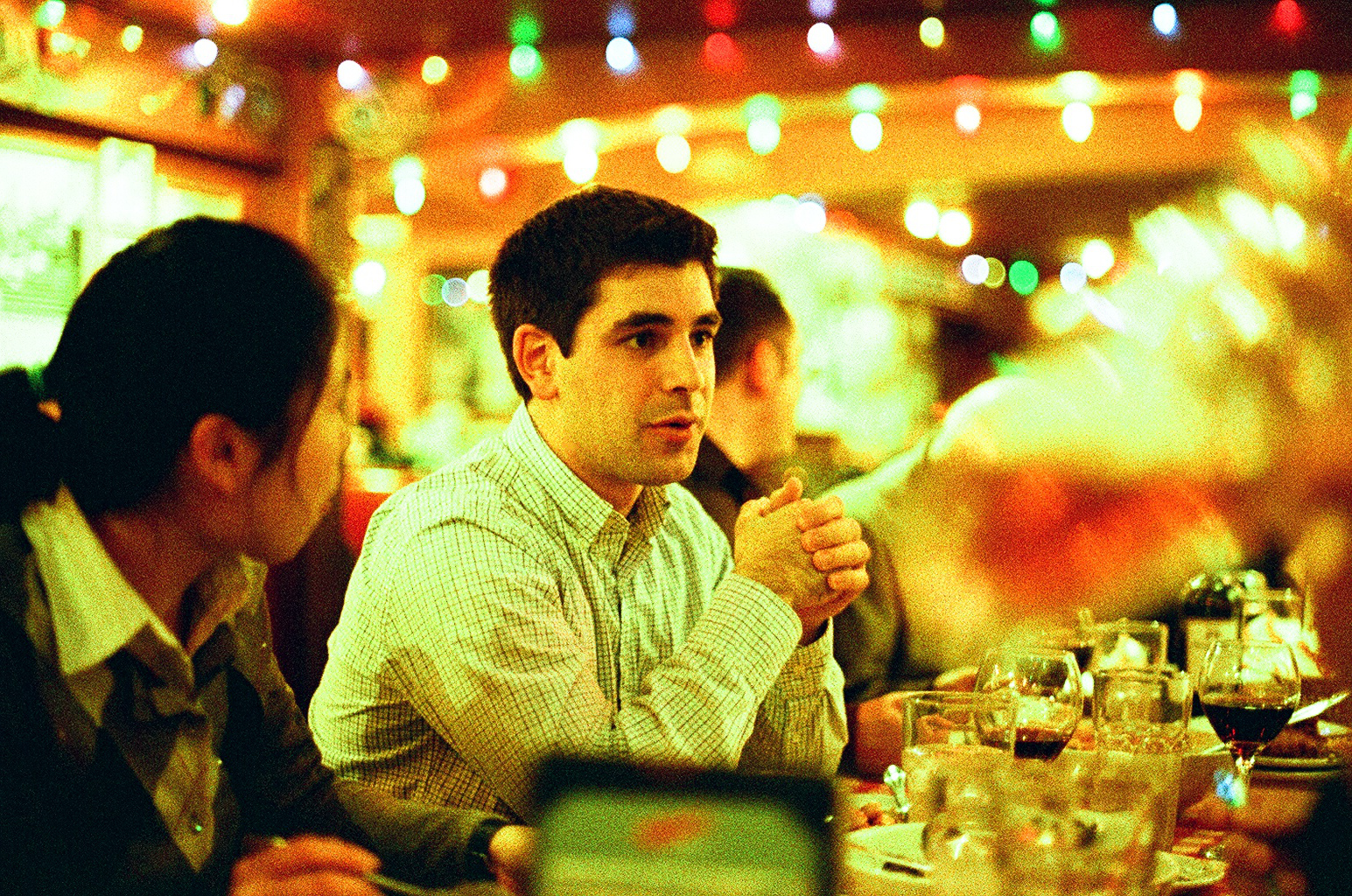
200 ISO Lomography Slide/Xpro film, processed with C-41 chemistry

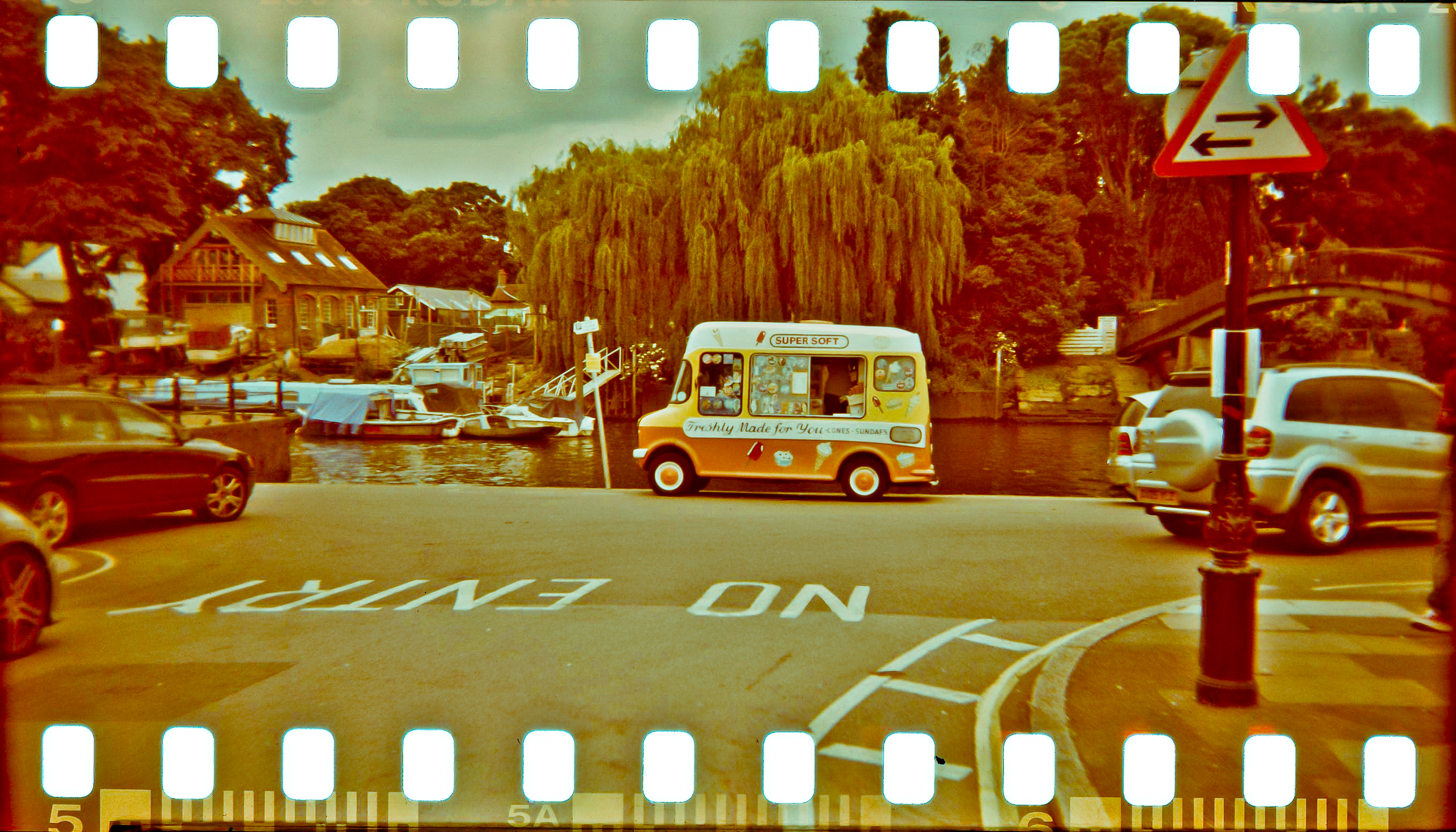
Kodak Color Plus negative film shot with a Holga, processed with E-6 chemistry

== See also ==
- Redscale
- Photographic processes
