= Sprocket hole photography =

Photography style

Kodak Ektachrome 200, shot in a Holga 120CFN

Sprocket hole photography is a style of photography that exposes the full width of a perforated film such as 35 mm film, creating a photograph punctuated by the "sprocket holes" (perforations) along the edges of the film. While 35 mm film is by far the most popular gauge, other perforated film gauges could theoretically be used, such as 8 mm, super 8, 9.5 mm, 16 mm and 65/70 mm.

Usually, this style involves the use of a medium format camera loaded with 35mm film by either using adapters or by rolling 35mm film into medium format backing paper. This is done because a standard 35 mm camera ordinarily would not expose the edges of the film. There exist cameras specifically designed for this purpose such as the Sprocket Rocket by Lomography.
