= ME4 =

ME4 or ME-4 may refer to:

- ME-4 process, a process for developing motion picture film
- Maine's 4th congressional district
- Maine State Route 4
- Masters Edition IV, a Magic: The Gathering expansion
- Mass Effect: Andromeda, a video game
