= E-3 process =

See also Ektachrome for full details of Kodak E-series processes.

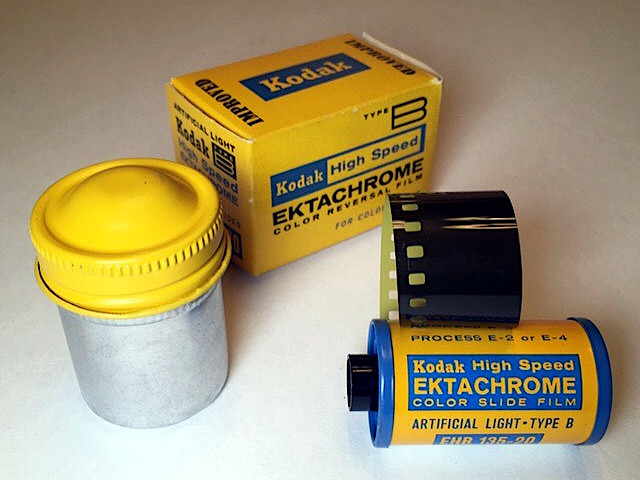
Ektachrome Type B, using E-2 or E-4 processes

The E-2 process and E-3 process are outdated processes for developing Ektachrome reversal photographic film. The two processes are very similar, and differ depending on the film. Kodak sold kits that could process either kind of film.

== Processing ==
Ektachrome film structure and exposure

Structure

Sample exposure to various colors

Ektachrome film has three separate light-sensitive layers; each layer is sensitive to a different group of wavelengths corresponding to red, green, and blue colors. When the film is exposed, each layer records a latent image based on its sensitivity. A yellow filter prevents blue light from exposing the green- and red-sensitive layers, which have some sensitivity to blue light.

Films are processed at 75 °F (23.9 °C) with a tolerance of only ±0.5°F; exceeding these limits could cause color shifts. The steps are:

Early Ektachrome processes
Step		Schematic	E-1 (1946)		E-1 (1955) E-2 (1955) E-3 (1959)		Description
Step		Schematic	Time (min)	Temp.	Time (min)	Temp.	Description
1	First developer		15	68 °F (20 °C)	10	75 °F (24 °C)	This is a conventional black-and-white developer, which develops the exposed portions as a negative.
2	Stop bath / rinse		1	65–72 °F (18–22 °C)	1	73–77 °F (23–25 °C)	
3	Hardener		5–10	66–70 °F (19–21 °C)	3–10	73–77 °F (23–25 °C)	
4	Reversal exposure		varies (typically 5 sec/side)				The film is removed from the tank and thoroughly exposed with a bright light for either 5 seconds on each side, or each end of the reel is exposed for 15 seconds at a distance of 1 ft (0.30 m) from a No. 2 photoflood. This step sensitizes the remaining silver halide crystals for the colour developer. Replace in tank, though the lid was no longer required.
5	Wash		5	65–72 °F (18–22 °C)	3	73–77 °F (23–25 °C)	Using running water
6	Colour developer		25	66–70 °F (19–21 °C)	15	73–77 °F (23–25 °C)	This develops the now exposed silver bromide, and simultaneously activates the dye couplers in the three colour-sensitive layers of the film.
7	Wash		5	65–72 °F (18–22 °C)	5	73–77 °F (23–25 °C)	Using running water
8	Clear		5	66–70 °F (19–21 °C)	5	73–77 °F (23–25 °C)	To remove pink stains left by the colour developer. Solution saved for fixing bath (step 12). In the E-1 process, this is noted as a "clearing and fixing bath."
9	Rinse		1	65–72 °F (18–22 °C)	1	73–77 °F (23–25 °C)	Using running water for at least 30 seconds, but not more than 90 seconds.
10	Bleach		10	66–70 °F (19–21 °C)	8	73–77 °F (23–25 °C)	To convert all the developed silver into compounds that are made soluble in the fixer
11	Rinse		1	65–72 °F (18–22 °C)	1	73–77 °F (23–25 °C)	
12	Fix		5	66–70 °F (19–21 °C)	3	73–77 °F (23–25 °C)	To remove all the developed silver. In the E-1 process, this is noted as a "clearing and fixing bath."
13	Wash		10	65–72 °F (18–22 °C)	8	73–77 °F (23–25 °C)	Running water
14	Stabilizing / Wetting agent rinse		1	65–72 °F (18–22 °C)	1	73–77 °F (23–25 °C)	Using Kodak Photo-Flo to remove water droplets
15	Dry		not specified		varies	<110 °F (43 °C)	Same as for black-and-white films

The original Ektachrome process introduced in 1946 used similar steps with different durations; the total processing time was approximately 90 minutes. It was renamed to E-1 when the E-2 process was introduced in 1955 for ASA 32 Ektachrome, followed by E-3 for ASA 50 Ektachrome in 1959.

Films designed for E-2 and E-3 are prone to fading because of the instability of the color dyes. The processes were phased out in 1974 in favor of E-4 (which was introduced in 1966), and two years later E-6 was introduced which remains in use to this day.
