= DR5 =

DR5 may refer to:

- DR5 (car), an Italian Mini SUV by DR Motor Company, based on the Chinese SUV Chery Tiggo
- TNFRSF10B, a human gene
- dr5 chrome, a reversal black-and-white process
- DR-5, a highway in the Dominican Republic
- DR5 register, a debug register in x86 processors
