= E-4 process =

See also Ektachrome for full details of Kodak E-series processes.

The E-4 process is a now outdated process for developing color reversal (transparency) photographic film, which was introduced in 1966.

== Drawbacks ==
The process is infamous for two reasons:

First, it uses the highly toxic boron hydride-based reversal agent tertiary butyl-amine borane (TBAB). (Note: Not to be confused with tetra-n-butylammonium bromide, which also is abbreviated as TBAB.) Early releases of the consumer-sized version of the chemistry provided the TBAB in the form of a tablet, possibly to avoid the possibility of inhalation. This was later changed to loose powder, likely as a countermeasure against inadvertent ingestion of the substance.

Second, the prehardener agent contains formaldehyde and 2,5-dimethoxytetrahydrofuran, which when mixed generates succinaldehyde, a noxious gas which has been likened to tear gas. Process E-6 films are hardened during manufacture, eliminating the prehardener step altogether and allowing them to be processed at 100 °F (38 °C).

== Steps ==
Ektachrome film structure and exposure

Structure

Sample exposure to various colors

Ektachrome film has three separate light-sensitive layers; each layer is sensitive to a different group of wavelengths corresponding to red, green, and blue colors. When the film is exposed, each layer records a latent image based on its sensitivity. A yellow filter prevents blue light from exposing the green- and red-sensitive layers, which have some sensitivity to blue light.

The E-4 process is faster than E-3; whereas E-3 required 15 steps and up to 70 minutes from start to finish, E-4 was completed in approximately 50 minutes over 13 steps. E-4 runs at 85 °F (29 °C), about 10 °F (6 °C) higher than E-3. The temperature tolerance is ±1 °F for prehardener, ±1/2°F for the first developer, and ±2–5 °F for all other steps. The ME-4 process was a motion picture variation of the E-4 process.

The major change for E-4 was the inclusion of a chemical reversal agent, which permits processing of the film without the manual re-exposure/fogging step required by the predecessor E-1 / E-2 / E-3 processes.

Total darkness is required during the first four development steps; normal room light can be used for the remaining steps.

E-4 Process
Step		Schematic	Time (min.)	Temp.	Description
1	Prehardener		3	85 °F (29 °C) ±1 °F	Tempers film for high-temperature processing
2	Neutralizer		1	83–87 °F (28–31 °C)	
3	First developer		7	85 °F (29 °C) ±1/2°F	Conventional black-and-white developer used to transform silver halide crystals exposed in all three layers as a negative image.
4	First stop bath		2	83–87 °F (28–31 °C)	Solution should not be reused for second stop bath (step 7)
5	Wash		4	80–90 °F (27–32 °C)	Running water
6	Color developer		9	83–87 °F (28–31 °C)	
7	Second stop bath		3	83–87 °F (28–31 °C)	Solution should not be reused from first stop bath (step 4)
8	Wash		3	80–90 °F (27–32 °C)	Running water
9	Bleach		5	83–87 °F (28–31 °C)	Convert metallic silver to soluble particles
10	Fixer		6	83–87 °F (28–31 °C)	Dissolve silver particles, which can be recovered after processing
11	Wash		6	80–90 °F (27–32 °C)	Running water
12	Stabilizer		1	83–87 °F (28–31 °C)	
13	Dry		var.	<110 °F (43 °C)	

== History ==
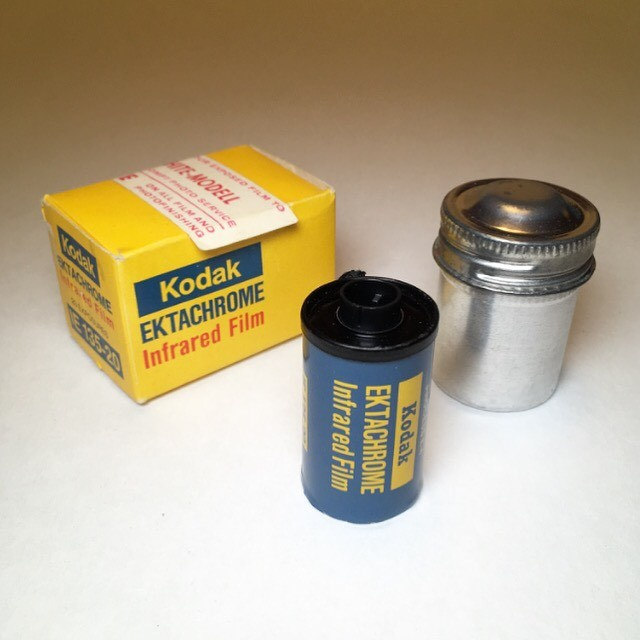
Kodak Ektachrome Infrared film using E-4 process

E-4 processed film is color stable for about 30 years.

The process largely was phased out in 1976 with the introduction of the E-6 process, which is more environmentally friendly due to its lack of toxic chemicals. E-6 avoids the use of TBAB by adding a separate reversal bath containing the tin salt stannous chloride.

The E-4 process has been discontinued since 1996; after 1976 it was used solely for Kodak IE color infrared film, due to a legal commitment by Kodak to provide process support for 30 years after introduction. Kodak discontinued E-4 processing in 1985, but independent photofinishers continued to support the process. The E-4 chemicals were reverse-engineered and substitute formulae were published in the British Journal of Photography Annual in 1977.
