= E-6 process =

Chromogenic photographic process

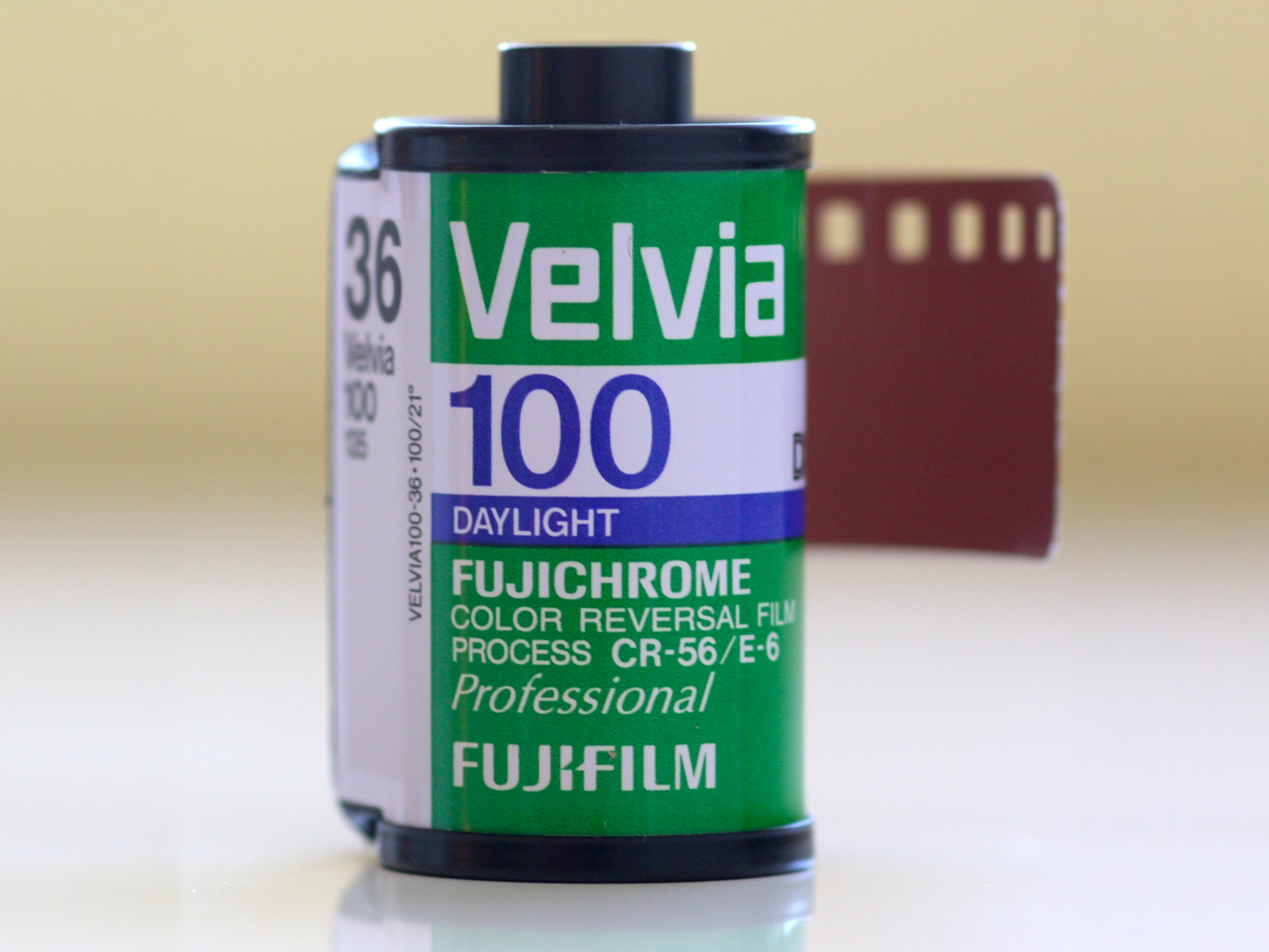
An example of slide film requiring development using the E-6 process

The E-6 process is a chromogenic photographic process for developing Ektachrome, Fujichrome and other color reversal (also called slide or transparency) photographic film.

Unlike some color reversal processes (such as Kodachrome K-14) that produce positive transparencies, E-6 processing can be performed by individual users with the same equipment that is used for processing black and white negative film or C-41 color negative film. The process is highly sensitive to temperature variations: a heated water bath is mandatory to stabilize the temperature at 100.0 °F (37.8 °C) for the first developer and first wash to maintain process tolerances.

== History ==
The E-6 process superseded Kodak's E-3 and E-4 processes. The E-3 process required fogging with light to accomplish image reversal and produced transparencies that faded quickly. The E-4 process used polluting chemicals, such as the highly toxic reversal agent borane tert-butylamine (TBAB).

Non-Kodak color reversal films introduced in the 1980s were compatible with the E-6 process, including variants of Fujichrome and Agfachrome, sold by Fujifilm and Agfa-Gevaert, respectively; one notable exception was Fujichrome 1600 Professional D, which was compatible with E-6 but used a customized PZ process for best results. The PZ process was similar to E-6, but used a different fog-suppressing chemical.

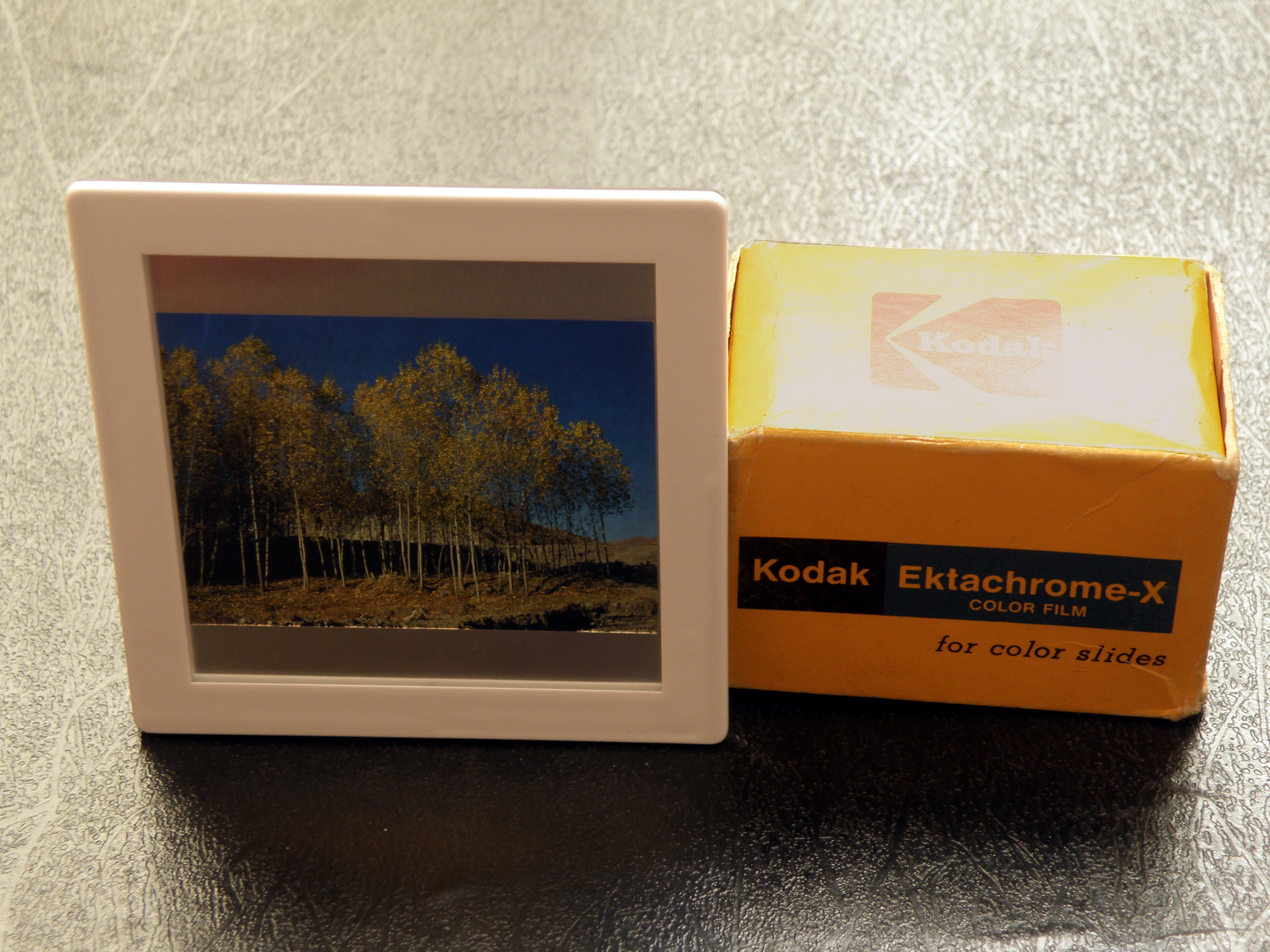
The E-6 process results in positive images that can be mounted and presented as slides

== Process variations ==
There are two versions of the E-6 process. Commercial laboratories use a six-bath chemical process. The 'hobby' type chemistry kits, such as those produced by Tetenal, use three chemical baths that combine the color developer and fogging (reversal) bath solutions, and the pre-bleach, bleach and fixer bath solutions. Rinses, washes, stop baths and stabilizer/final rinse (the final step of the process) are not counted as baths when describing both the conventional six bath and hobbyist three bath processes.

=== Six-bath process ===
E-6 film structure and exposure

Structure

Sample exposure to various colors

The structure of E-6 film has three separate light-sensitive layers; each layer is sensitive to a different group of wavelengths corresponding to red, green, and blue colors. When the film is exposed, each layer records a latent image based on its sensitivity. A yellow filter prevents blue light from exposing the green- and red-sensitive layers, which have some sensitivity to blue light.

Kodak Publication Z-119 provides instructions for various methods to carry out the E-6 process, including the use of continuous processors, roller-transport processors, rack-and-tank processors, batch processing, and rotary-tube processors; however, they largely share the same steps and recommendations for time and temperature with the exception of rotary-tube processors. The first developer, first wash, and reversal bath must be carried out in darkness.

Process E-6
Step			Time (min.)	Temp.	Schematic	Description
1	First developer bath	Bath 1	6	98–103 °F (36.7–39.4 °C)		This uses a potassium hydroquinone monosulfonate–phenidone black & white film developer, with the preferred form of phenidone being 4-hydroxymethyl-4-methyl-1-phenyl-3-pyrazolidinone (13047–13–7). The first developer forms a negative silver image in each layer of the film. The first developer is time and temperature sensitive because it controls contrast.
2	First wash		2	92–103 °F (33.3–39.4 °C)		This step once used an acetic acid stop bath, but was replaced with a water-only bath for process economy, with concomitant slight reduction of first developer strength.
3	Reversal bath	Bath 2	2	75–103 °F (23.9–39.4 °C)		This bath prepares the film for the color developer step. A chemical reversal agent is absorbed into the emulsion, which is instantly effective. The reversal step can also be carried out using 800 footcandle-seconds (8.6 klx·s) of light — this variation is used by process engineers to troubleshoot reversal bath chemistry problems such as contamination and issues of low tank turnover as process volumes decline.
4	Color developer bath	Bath 3	6	98–103 °F (36.7–39.4 °C)		This step is carried out to completion. The developer contains CD-3 developing agent, and acts upon the chemically exposed silver halide that was not developed in the first developer to form a positive silver image. The metallic negative silver image formed in the first developer has no part in the reaction of this step. As the color development progresses, a metallic positive silver image is formed and the color developing agent is oxidized. Oxidized color developer molecules react with the color couplers and color dyes are formed in each of the three layers of the film. Each layer of the film contains different color couplers, which react with the same oxidized developer molecules but form different color dyes. Variation in color developer pH causes color shifts on the green-magenta axis with Kodak E100G & E100GX and Fujichrome films and on the yellow-blue axis with older Ektachrome films.
5	Pre-bleach bath	Bath 4	2	75–103 °F (23.9–39.4 °C)		This bath was previously called "conditioner", but was renamed pre-bleach in the mid-1990s to reflect the removal of formaldehyde from the process used in the final rinse. In this solution, formaldehyde acts as a dye preservative and EDTA is used to "kick off" the bleach. The pre-bleach bath relies on carry-over of the color developer to function properly, therefore there is no wash step between the color developer and pre-bleach baths.
6	Bleach bath	Bath 5	6	92–103 °F (33.3–39.4 °C)		This is a process-to-completion step, and relies on carry-over of pre-bleach to initiate the bleach. The bleach converts metallic silver into silver bromide, which is converted to soluble silver compounds by the fixer. During bleaching, iron (III) EDTA is converted to iron (II) EDTA (Fe^{3+} EDTA + Ag + Br^{−}→ Fe^{2+} EDTA + AgBr) before fixing. Kodak also has a process variant which uses a higher concentration of bleach and a 4:00 bath time; but with process volumes declining, this variant has become uneconomical.
7	Wash step		(optional)			Rinses off the bleach and extends the life of the fixer bath. This wash step is recommended for rotary tube, sink line and other low volume processing.
8	Fixer bath	Bath 6	4	92–103 °F (33.3–39.4 °C)		This is a process-to-completion step.
9	Second fixer stage		(optional)			Using fresh fixer. The archival properties of film and paper are greatly improved using a second fixing stage in a reverse cascade. Many C-41RA (rapid access) minilab processors also use 2 stage reverse cascade fixing for faster throughput.
10	Final wash		4	92–103 °F (33.3–39.4 °C)		
11	Final rinse		1	Ambient		Up until the mid-1990s, the final rinse was called a stabilizer bath, since it contained formaldehyde. Currently, the final rinse uses a surfactant, and miconazole, an anti-fungal agent.
12	Drying		var.	<145 °F (63 °C)		Drying in a dust-free environment.

=== Three-bath process ===
Tetenal nearly closed in 2019, but was rescued through a management buyout, and relaunched its online store in 2020, operating as Tetenal 1847 GmbH. However, the chemical production part of Tetenal 1847 was spun off as Norderstedter Chemiewerke in 2022, which filed for bankruptcy in February 2023 and the Tetenal three-bath process is no longer available. Adox and others also provide the three-bath process with kits being widely available.

Tetenal Colortec E-6
Step			Time (min:sec)	Temp.	Schematic	Description
1	First developer (FD)	Bath 1	6:15 to 6:45	100 ± 0.5 °F (37.8 ± 0.3 °C)		The first developer bath is a black & white film developer, which forms a negative silver image in each layer of the film. The first developer is time and temperature sensitive because it controls contrast. The amount of time depends on the quantity of developer solution and the number of films present. Exposures may be pushed by increasing the time in the first bath, pulled by reducing the time in the first bath, with an adjustment of approximately 25% for a one-step change.
2	Wash		2:30	100 ± 1 °F (37.8 ± 0.6 °C)		Rinse with running water, change water after 30 seconds, or extend rinsing time if necessary.
3	Color developer (CD)	Bath 2	6 to 8	100 ± 1 °F (37.8 ± 0.6 °C)		This bath combines the reversal / fogging bath, which chemically sensitizes silver halide left unsensitized during the exposure, with the color developer (dye formation) bath. When this step is complete, a positive silver image is formed with the chemically exposed silver halide. The metallic negative silver image formed in the first developer has no part in the reaction of this step. As the color development progresses, a metallic positive silver image is formed and the color developing agent is oxidized. Oxidized color developer molecules react with the color couplers and color dyes are formed in each of the three layers of the film. Each layer of the film contains a specific, complementary (subtractive color) dye coupler; for example, the blue-sensitive layer forms a yellow (minus-blue) image.
4	Wash		2:30	97 ± 5 °F (36.1 ± 2.8 °C)		Rinse with running water, change water after 30 seconds, or extend rinsing time if necessary.
5	Bleach & fix (BX)	Bath 3	6 to 8	97 ± 5 °F (36.1 ± 2.8 °C)		Bleach converts metallic silver into silver bromide, which is converted to soluble silver compounds by the fixer.
6	Wash		4	97 ± 5 °F (36.1 ± 2.8 °C)		Rinse with running water, change water after 30 seconds, or extend rinsing time if necessary.
7	Stabilizer		1	68–77 °F (20.0–25.0 °C)		The film is taken out of the tank for the finishing stabilizer step.

== See also ==
- Replenishment (photography)
