= Ektachrome =

Brand name of a Kodak film

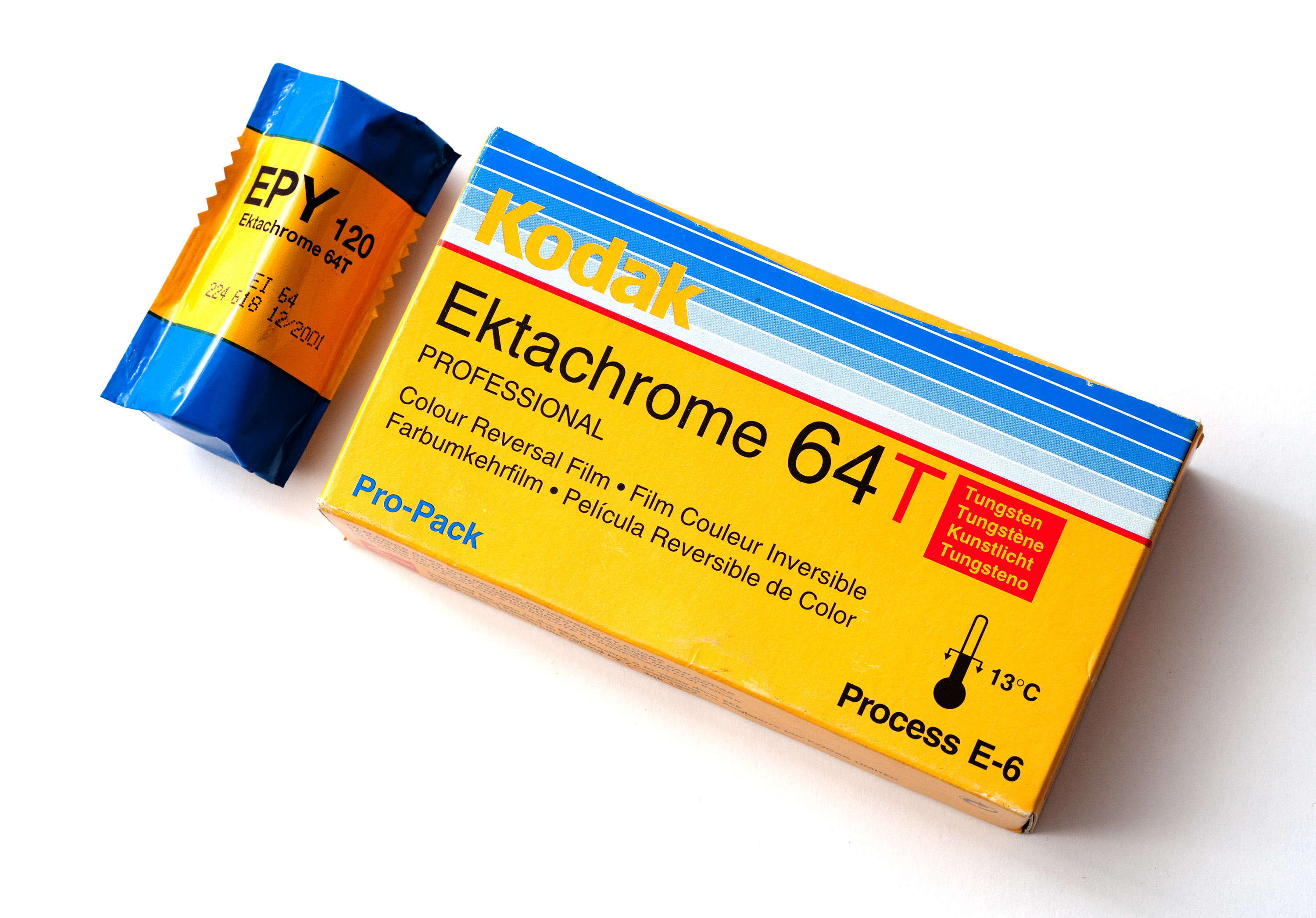
A box of Ektachrome 64T in 120 format, late 90's European package, expired December 2001

Ektachrome is a brand name owned by Kodak for a range of transparency, still and motion picture films available in many formats, including 35 mm and sheet sizes to 8 × 10 inch size. Introduced in 1946, Ektachrome has a distinctive look that became familiar to many readers of National Geographic, which used it extensively for color photographs for decades in settings where Kodachrome was too slow. In terms of reciprocity characteristics, Ektachrome is stable at shutter speeds between ten seconds and 1/10,000 of a second.

== History ==
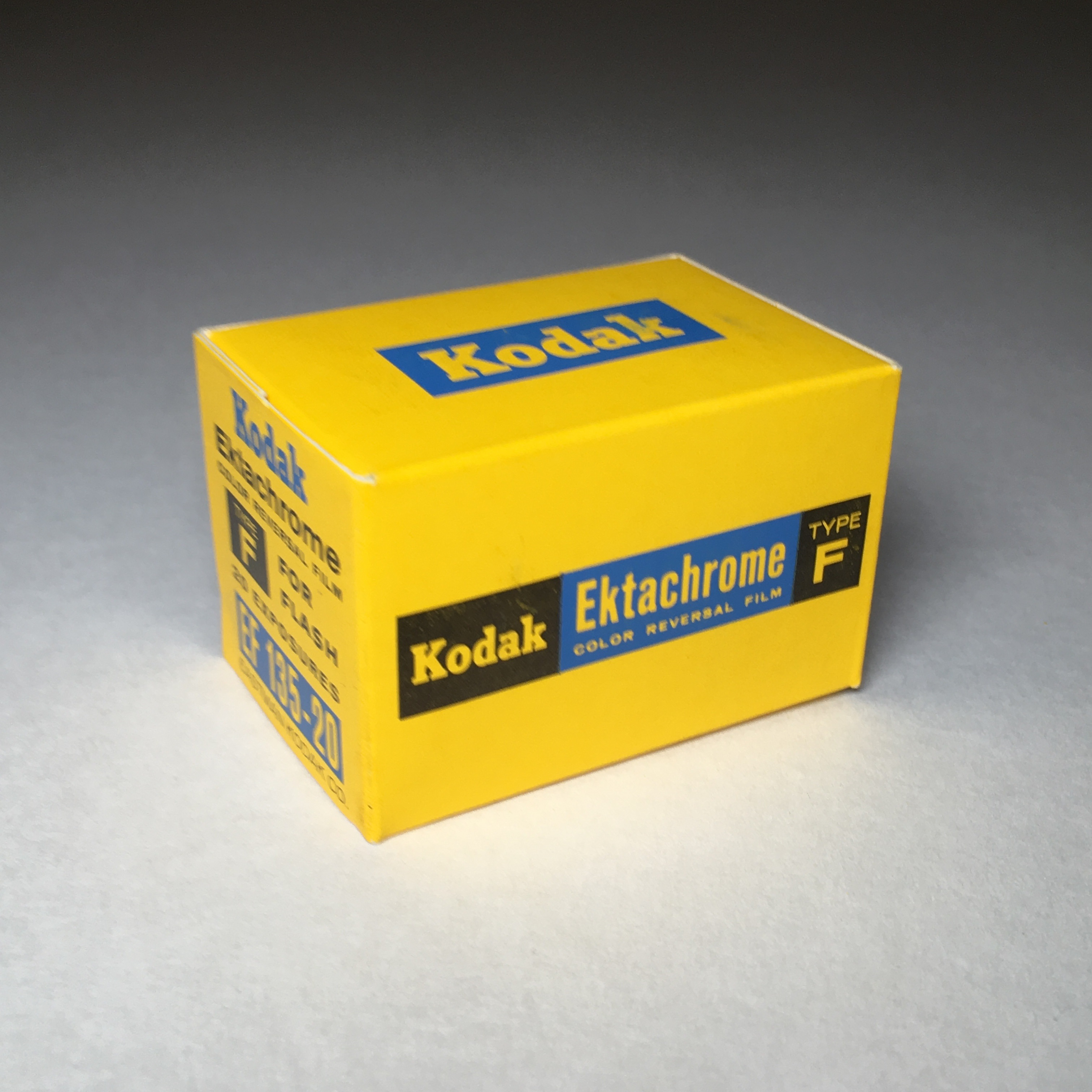
Kodak Ektachrome F 35mm Slide Film, E-2 Process, Expired: February 1963

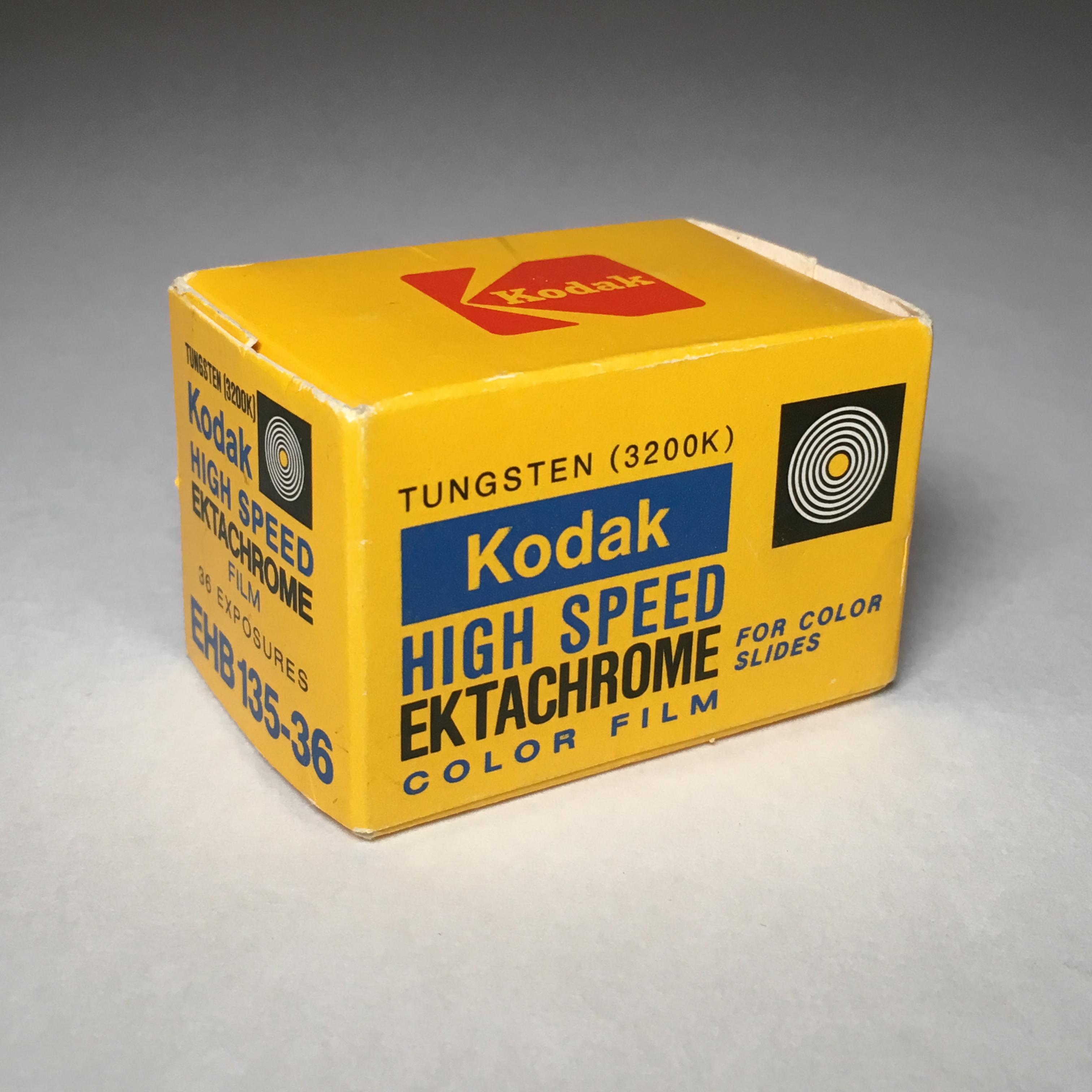
Kodak High Speed Ektachrome 35mm Film (Expired: 1970s)

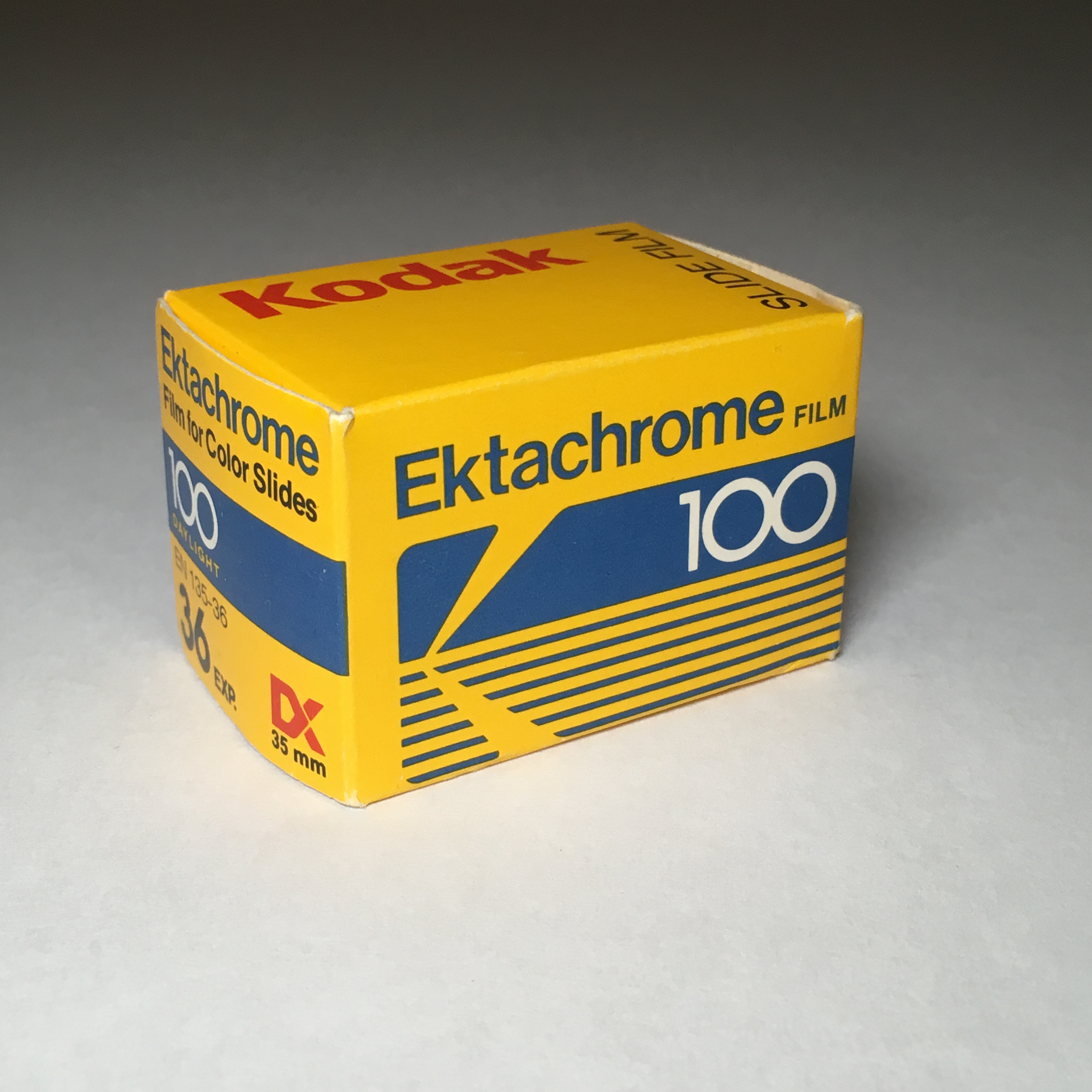
Kodak Ektachrome 100 35mm Slide Film

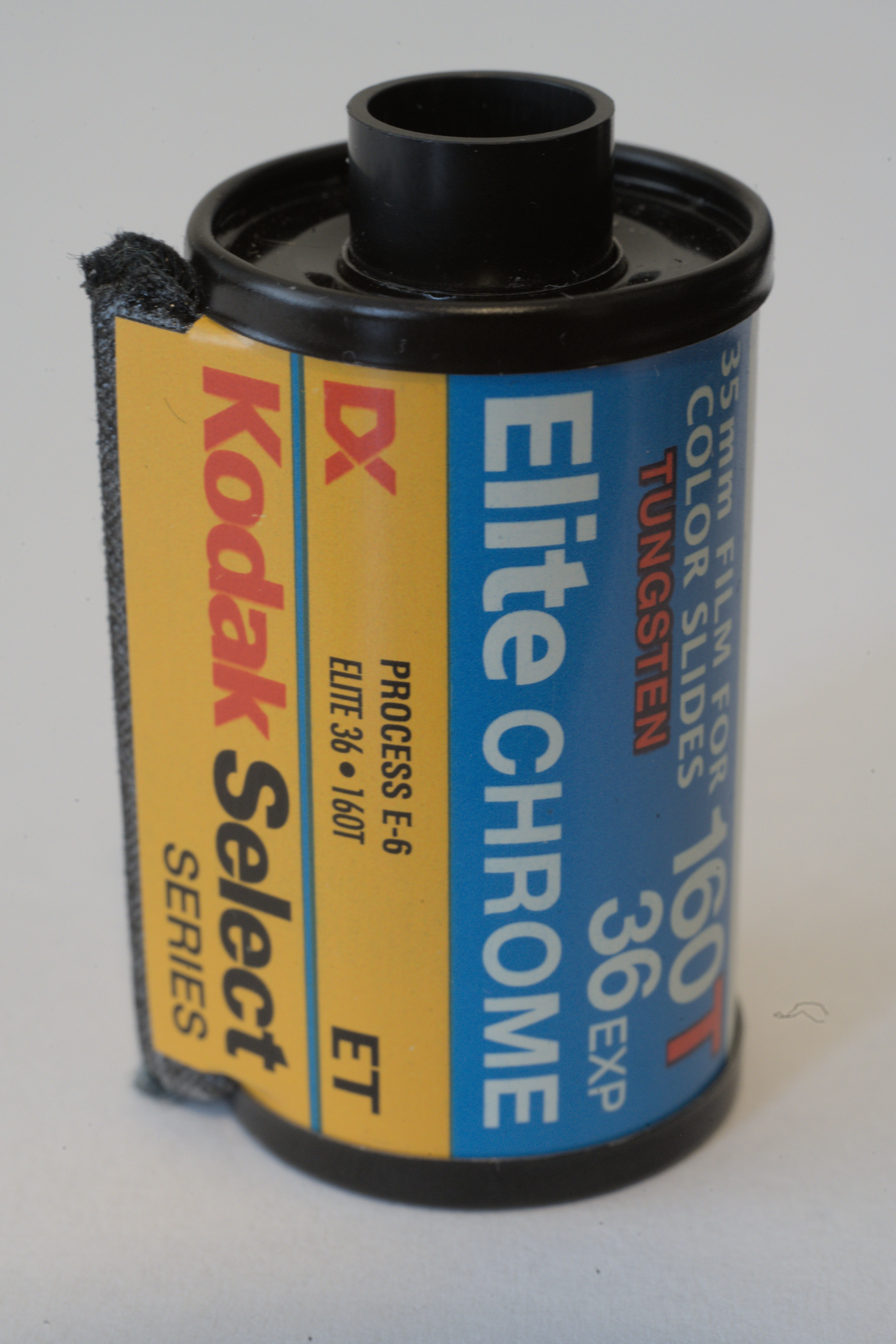
A cassette of the rebranded Elite Chrome 160T in 135 format

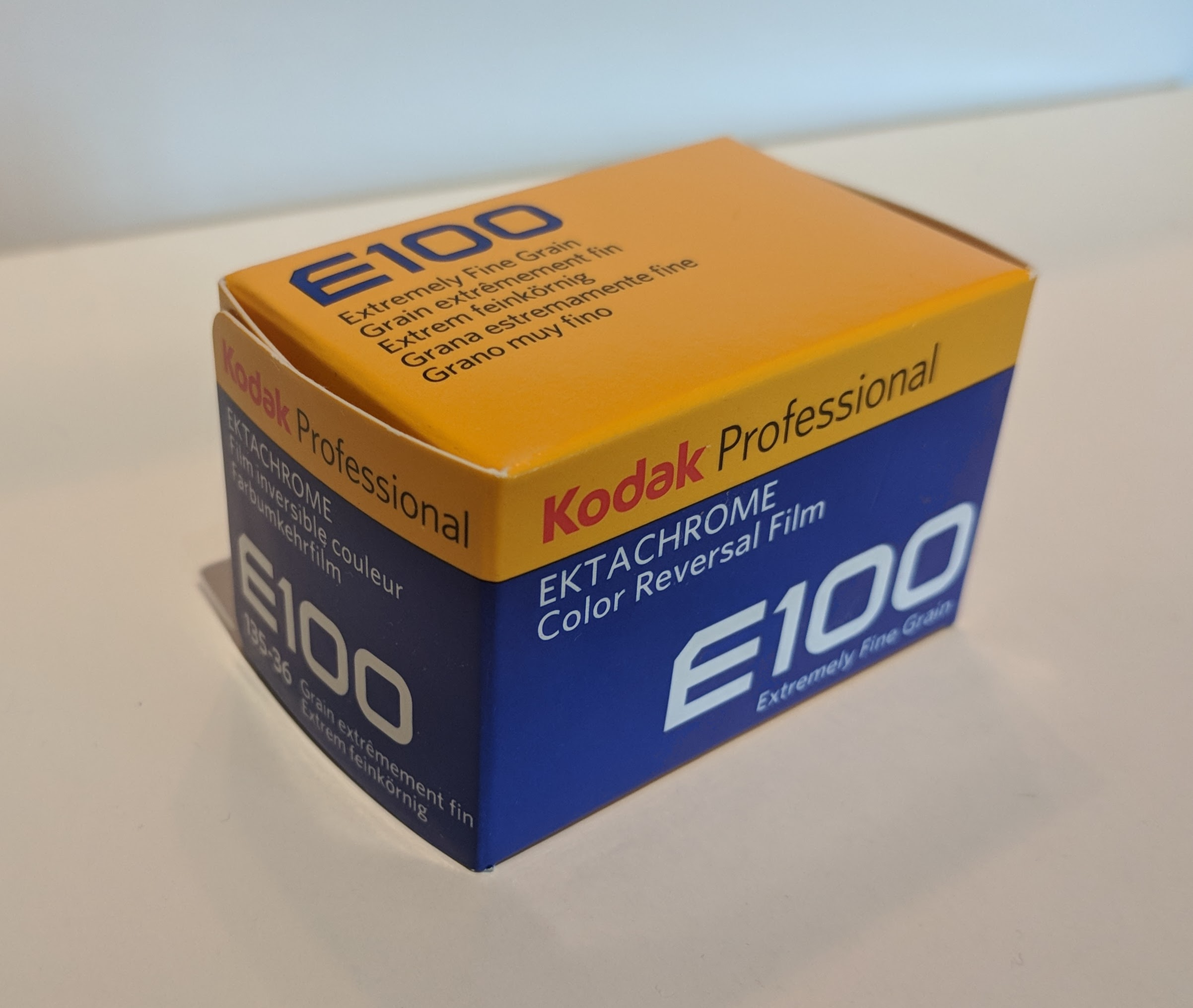
Kodak Ektachrome 100 35mm Color Reversal Film, 2018.

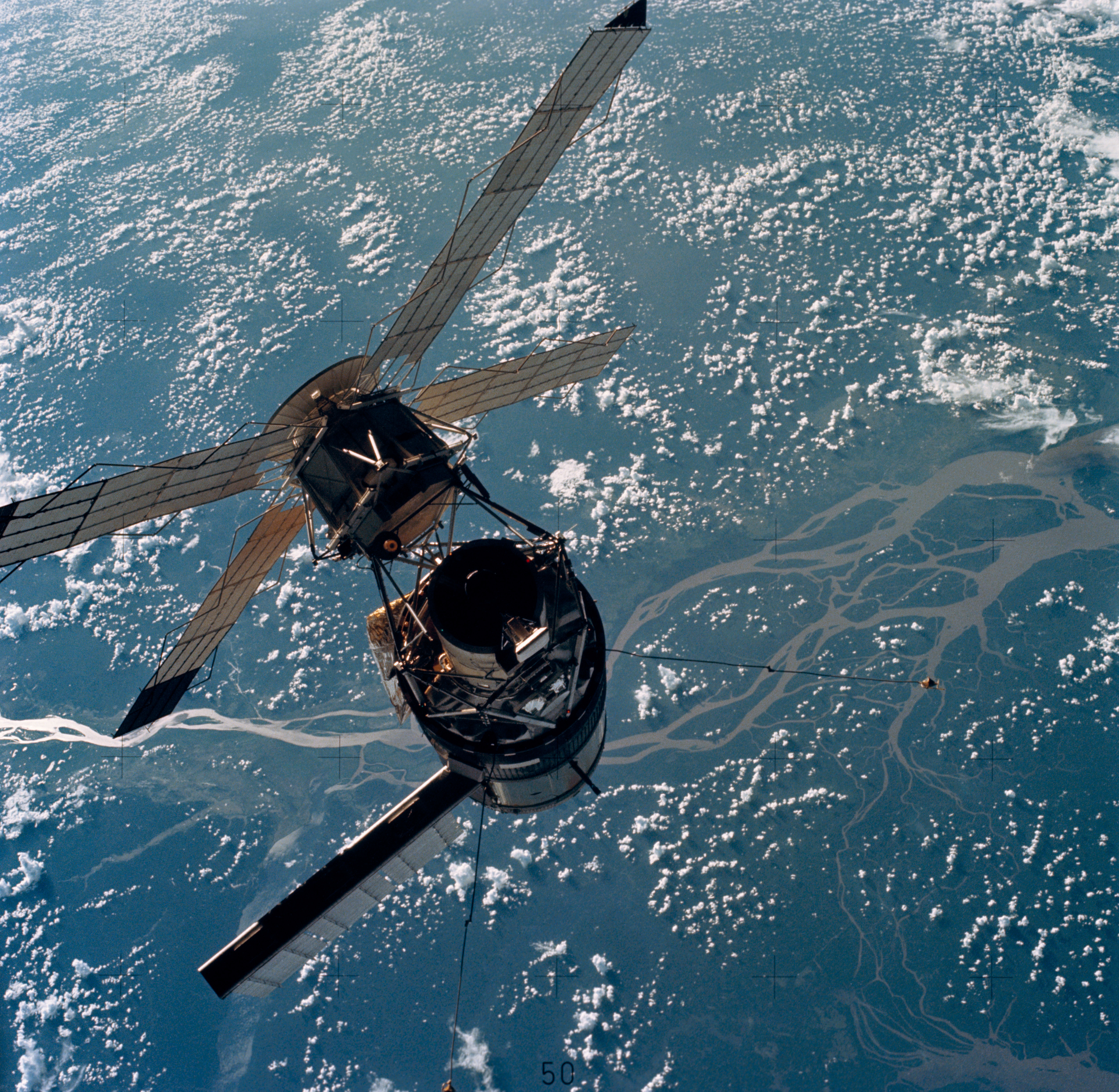
A view of the Skylab space station taken with a hand-held 70 mm Hasselblad camera using a 100 mm lens and SO-368 medium speed Ektachrome film

Ektachrome, introduced in 1946, allowed professionals and amateurs alike to process their own films. It also made color reversal film more practical in larger formats, and the Kodachrome Professional film in sheet sizes was later discontinued.

High Speed Ektachrome, announced in 1959 provided an ASA 160 color film, which was much faster than Kodachrome. In 1968, Kodak started offering push processing of this film, allowing it to be used at ASA 400.

Whereas the development process used by Kodachrome is technically intricate and beyond the means of amateur photographers and smaller photographic labs, Ektachrome processing is simpler, and small professional labs could afford equipment to develop the film. Many process variants (designated E-1 through E-6) were used to develop it over the years. Modern Ektachrome films are developed using the E-6 process, which can be carried out by small labs or by a keen amateur using a basic film tank and tempering bath to maintain the temperature at 100 °F (38 °C).

Several years before Ektachrome's discontinuation, some of Kodak's consumer E-6 films were rebranded as Elite Chrome. In late 2009, Kodak announced the discontinuation of Ektachrome 64T (EPY) and Ektachrome 100 Plus (EPP) films, citing declining sales. On February 4, 2011, Kodak announced the discontinuance of Ektachrome 200 on its website. On March 1, 2012, Kodak announced the discontinuance of three color Ektachrome films. In December 2012 Kodak announced its discontinuance of Ektachrome 100D color reversal movie film in certain formats. By late 2013, all Ektachrome products were discontinued.

On September 25, 2018, Kodak announced that the 35 mm format of Ektachrome was again available, while Super 8 and 16 mm motion picture versions would be available later.

== Processing ==
Although Kodachrome was often considered a superior film due to its archival qualities and color palette, advances in dye and coupler technology blurred the boundaries between the differing processes, along with Kodak having abandoned Kodachrome research and development after the mid-1990s. Furthermore, the developing of Kodachrome always required a complex, fickle process requiring an on-site analytical lab and typically required a turnaround of several days to allow for shipping times. By contrast, small professional labs have been able to process Ektachrome on-site since the 1950s, with product safety and effluent discharge having been drastically improved since the 1970s, when Kodak reformulated their entire color chemistry lineup. It is even possible for amateur labs to process Ektachrome within an hour using a rotary tube processor (made by Jobo, WingLynch or PhotoTherm), sink-line, or even by hand inversion in a small drum and E-2, E-4, and E-6 processing chemistry kits were sold for home darkrooms.

== Variants ==
- Before Process AR-5 there was EA-5 for aero film. This is a hot version of E-4 and similar to ME-4 for Ektachrome motion picture film.
- E-6 was made available to the public in 1975, but only the pro films were available at the time. There were some color stability ("keeping") issues to verify before the amateur films could be released.
- E-7 is the "mix-it-yourself" version of E-6. Functionally it was equivalent, but there were a few differences.
- ES-8 is a special process for one type of Super 8mm movie film. It was introduced in 1975.

There were some other Ektachrome processes for 16 mm motion picture films:

- ME-2A
- ECO-2
- EC0-3
- E-89
- E-99
- VNF-1 ("Video News Film", as this film was originally introduced for 16 mm news gathering)
- RVNP
- CRI-1

The following processes are used for amateur Ektachrome super 8 mm movie film:

- Ektachrome Movie process introduced in 1971 (movies without movie lights). The process was later designated EM-24
- EM-25 is the mix-it-yourself version of EM-24.
- EM-26 is the updated process for improved Ektachrome super 8 films introduced in 1981.
- EM-27 is the mix-it-yourself version of EM-26.

== Process history ==
E-1
Initial Ektachrome process for sheet and roll film (1946 – c. 1950s)
E-2
Updated Ektachrome process for roll film and 135 film (1955–1966). A 1959 modification was called "improved" E-2.
E-3
Updated "professional" Ektachrome process for sheet film and Kodak EP professional rollfilm (1959 to 1976)
E-4
Updated Ektachrome process for roll film and 135 film (1966–1996, see note) E-4 was better at resisting fading than the earlier processes, with a life around 30 years.
E-5
Research project, only saw minor use in a revised form as the aerial film process AR-5
E-6
Ektachrome process used for all major color reversal films and formats, as of 1977. The conditioner, bleach and stabilizer baths were modified in the mid-1990s to remove the formaldehyde from the stabilizer: This change was indicated by changing the names of the conditioner step to pre-bleach step, and the stabilizer step to the final rinse step; E-6P: Used for push processing of Kodak Ektachrome films in general, and particularly for Kodak Ektachrome EPH ISO 1600 film, which has a speed of ISO 400 in normal E6, but is exposed at EI 1600 and push processed two stops in the first developer bath (10:00 @100.0 °F) to achieve the ISO 1600 speed rating. (It is natural for a faster film to require a longer first development time. This is sacrificed in the case of most color processing for consistency in processing, especially in machine processing.)

Other film manufacturers use their own designations for nearly identical processes. They include Fujifilm's process CR-55 (E-4) and CR-56 (cross-licensed with Kodak's process E-6; but with slight variations in the first developer); and the now-discontinued Agfachrome and Konica's CRK-2 (E-6 equivalent).

The E-4 process was generally discontinued after 1977, although continued in use for Kodak PCF (Photomicrography Color Film) until the 1980s, and for Kodak IE (Color Infra-red film) until 1996. This was due to a legal commitment by Kodak to provide the process for 30 years.

The Ektachrome process differs significantly from the Agfa Process AP-41, used generally until 1983 to develop films such as Agfachrome CT18 and 50s Professional.

== Processing laboratories ==
The Washington (W) Processing Lab operated between 1967 and July 1999. The lab facility was located in Montgomery County at the address of 1 Choke Cherry Road, Rockville, Maryland.

The Palo Alto (P) California Processing Lab was located at 925 Page Mill Road, Palo Alto, California.

The Rochester (R) New York Processing Lab was located at Kodak Park in Rochester, New York.

There were also Kodak processing laboratories in other locations, including Chicago, (Illinois), Hollywood, (California-H), Atlanta (Georgia), Findlay (Ohio), Toronto (Canada) and Hemel Hempstead (England).

== Return of Ektachrome ==
On January 5, 2017, Kodak Alaris announced that Ektachrome would return in both ISO 100 35 mm still frame and Super 8 motion picture formats, before the end of the year. However, the release date was later pushed to 2018 after it was discovered certain materials used in its manufacture were now unavailable, requiring a reformulation. Kodak will manufacture the film and market the Super 8 version. Kodak Alaris will market the 35 mm still version.

The Super-8 version was exhibited at the 2018 Consumer Electronics Show, and was named Ektachrome 100D 7294.

In fall 2018, Kodak released the newly-formulated Ektachrome with 35 mm format being the first to arrive on September 25 and in Super 8 format on October 1.

On June 1, 2019, Kodak Alaris announced a wide coating trial of Ektachrome in 120 format for the end of July. Previously, in January 2019, a Kodak Alaris representative indicated work was progressing on Ektachrome in both 120 and larger formats. This project reached completion when, on December 10, 2019, Kodak Alaris announced the availability of Ektachrome E100 in a 120-format 5-roll propack and a 4 × 5 box of 10 sheets.

== Usage for motion pictures ==
=== TV news (1970s–1980s) ===
Ektachrome has occasionally been used as a motion picture film stock, particularly for TV news gathering in the late 1970s and early 1980s. In fact, Kodak released Ektachrome 7/5240 VNF (125T) in 1975 for that very purpose, where "VNF" stood for Video News Film.

=== Cross-processed use and use of old stock (1990s–2000s) ===
It has been featured in three 1990s and 2000s productions, none of which showed a genuine portrayal of the high technical standards of then-modern Ektachrome:

- Both the 1999 film Three Kings and the 2006 film Inside Man were shot on then-modern Ektachrome, but in both cases, the stock was cross-processed in C-41 color negative chemistry and subjected to a bleach bypass, in order to achieve a particularly gritty or "different" look.
  - The Ektachrome sections of Three Kings (1999) were made on custom-made rolls of Ektachrome 100 Plus, aka EPP,
  - The Ektachrome sections of Inside Man (2006) were made on Ektachrome 100D 5285, introduced in 2005/06 as a movie version of the still-photography stock Ektachrome EBX.
- The 1998 film Buffalo '66 was also shot on Ektachrome and actually processed in its genuine E6 reversal process, however this production used Ektachrome 160T 5239, an old stock originally introduced in 1975 that would turn out greenish upon processing and the film properties of which, although still sold by that time, were heavily outdated by the standards of 1990s Ektachrome.

=== Untarnished use in motion pictures (1990s–2000s) ===
Unlike the above films, one professional motion picture that shows the genuine properties and high standards of 1990s and 2000s Ektachrome was Oliver Stone's World Trade Center (2006). Released the same year as Inside Man, it also used Ektachrome 100D 5285 (alongside negative Kodak Vision 2 stock), but in this case, the stock was developed in its standard E6 reversal process. Stone would go on to use 5285 for some scenes in his 2012 film Savages, and had earlier used 5239 Ektachrome stock to shoot the majority of his 1997 film U Turn.

Next to his above film Inside Man (2006) where the Ektachrome stock was cross-processed, American filmmaker Spike Lee is known for using Ektachrome for some of his works as soon as digital intermediate scans (instead of traditional film prints, a process not suited for reversal stocks such as Ektachrome) had matured enough by the mid-1990s, namely Clockers (1995), Get on the Bus (1996), Summer of Sam (1999), and 25th Hour (2002), until Kodak discontinued Ektachrome in 2012.

=== Ektachrome 100D 5294/7294 (2018–present) ===
Upon the revival of the 16 mm format of Ektachrome in October 2018, Lee used the film stock again in some of the scenes of his 2020 film Da 5 Bloods. In that film, Lee specifically used Ektachrome in Super 8mm to simulate the footages captured by the actor Norman Lewis.

For the second season of the American TV series Euphoria released in 2022, Kodak revived the 35 mm motion picture format of Ektachrome at the request of the filmmakers. Ektachrome was also used to photograph sections of the film Poor Things (2023), whereupon its cinematographer Robbie Ryan noted that the unique color produced by the stock was referenced throughout the grading process to inform the film's overall visual style.

A 65 mm version was created specifically for the 2025 film Sinners, where it was used for a flashback sequence.

Music videos featuring new Ektachrome include:

- Who Cares (2018) by Paul McCartney (16 mm, used alongside 65mm Kodak Vision 3 stock)
- All Too Well: The Short Film (2021) by American singer-songwriter Taylor Swift (35 mm, alongside Vision 3)
- Body Paint (2022) by British indie rock band Arctic Monkeys (16 mm)
