= Dr5 chrome =

dr5, or dr5 Chrome, is a reversal black and white process, through which most kinds of black-and-white negative films produce transparencies, including Scala and Foma-r films (slides). The dr5 process is a chemical reversal process, rather than the standard, light-based reversal for black and white transparency (slide). It was developed by photographer and photographic chemist David Wood.

== History ==
The "dr5 process" is the fifth incarnation of the process, derived by experimentation by Wood from 1989 through 1991. Though reversal film processing was well known throughout photographic history, the dr5 process is proprietary. Privately performing the process alone until 1998.

The dr5 process won best new product in 1999 at the '99 Photo Expo-Plus Expo Review. In August 2001, Wood opened an independent lab, that used a processor made to dr5's specifications by Tecnolab in Italy.

== Current ==
As of 2023, the DR5 process—a unique black-and-white slide (reversal) development process—has been discontinued. This specialized process, which allowed certain black-and-white films to be developed into positives (slides) instead of negatives, was known for its exceptional sharpness, contrast, and tonality.

Like many other niche film processing methods, DR5 faced challenges due to declining demand, the rising costs of materials, rising operational costs, and challenges in maintaining the necessary chemistry, and the overall shrinking market for analog photography. This follows a historical pattern where specialized photographic processes have faded out over time.

Wood had been running the DR5 lab for decades, providing photographers with a specialized alternative to traditional black-and-white negative processing. David Wood continues to privately develop film for his own photography.
