= Reversal film =

Type of photographic film that produces a positive image on a transparent base

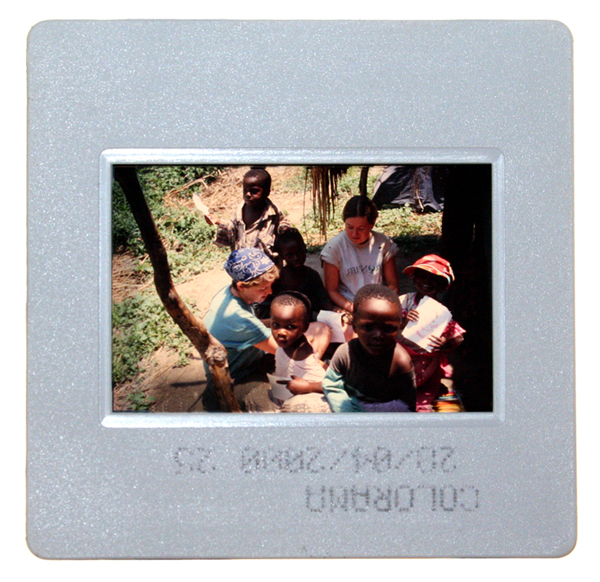
A square diapositive slide contains a single frame of reversal film, which image shows the bright colours of the people and the place.

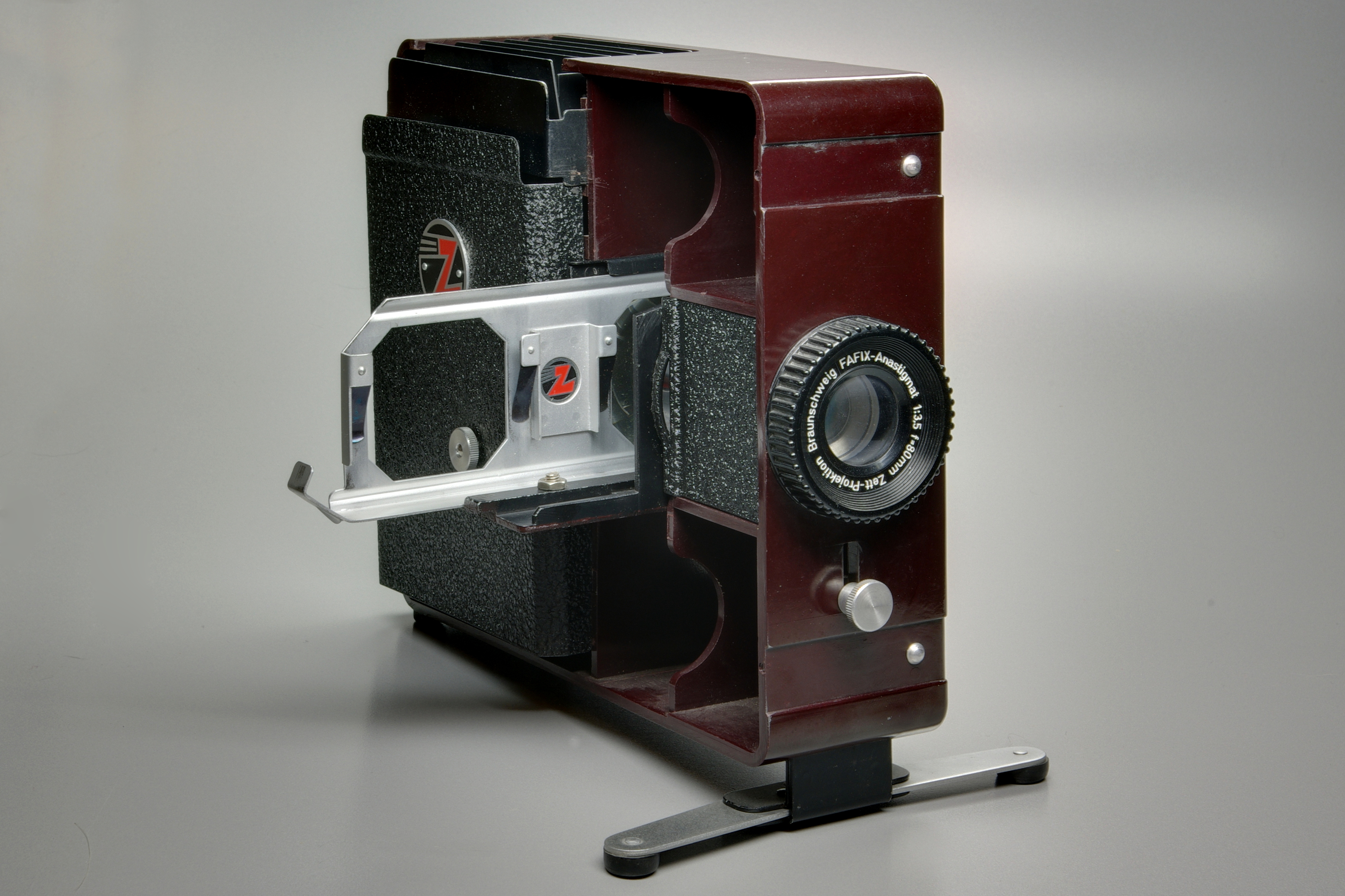
A Zett Fafix BW slide projector; note the large projection lens and the double slide carrier.

In photography, the terms reversal film, slide film, positive film, and transparency film describe a type of photographic film that produces a positive image on a transparent film base. In place of negatives and printed photographs, reversal film produces diapositive photographs, known as diafilm and dia images. A diapositive slide is a mounted frame of transparency film intended for large-format projection of the image onto a screen by a slide projector. Such large-format projection permits many spectators to view the diapositive image at one time. The usual transparency-film format is the 35 mm slide, wherein one frame of film is mounted into a 2 in. ×2 in. square made either of cardboard or of a plastic material. Reversal film is produced in format sizes that range from 35 mm to roll film to 8 in. ×10 in. sheet film.

Moreover, specialized photographic processing laboratories produce diapositive slides from digital-camera images in formats such as the JPEG, from computer-generated presentation graphics, and from images of physical materials such as fingerprints, microscopic evidence, paper documents, astronomic images, etc. Reversal film also is used as motion picture film in the 16 mm, Super 8 and 8 mm cine film formats, and produces a positive-image film that was originated in the cinematographic camera. In terms of film-production costs, such a cinematographic application of reversal film is more cost-effective than filming with negative film that then must be developed into a positive-image film for projection in a cinema.

== History ==
=== Additive method ===
The earliest practical and commercially successful color photography reversal process was the Lumière Autochrome, introduced in 1907. It was an additive method, using a panchromatic emulsion coated on a thin glass plate previously coated with a layer of dyed potato starch grains. Autochrome plates were discontinued in the 1930s, after the introduction of Lumière Filmcolor in sheet film and Lumicolor in roll film sizes. Also using the additive principle and reversal processing were the Agfa color screen plates and films and Dufaycolor film, all of which were discontinued by 1961.

=== Subtractive methods ===
Subtractive color reversal film exposure and development

Exposure: different wavelengths of light selectively sensitize each of the three layers; an internal yellow (blue-blocking) filter is used to prevent false sensitization of the red- and green-sensitive layers

Developed: E-6 process results in negative image layers with the appropriate subtractive colors

Leopold Godowsky, Jr. and Leopold Mannes, working with the Eastman Kodak Company, developed Kodachrome, the first commercially successful color film to use the subtractive method. Kodachrome was introduced in 1935 as 16mm motion picture film, and in 1936 as 35mm film for still cameras. Kodachrome films contain no color dye couplers; these are added during processing. The final development process published by Kodak as K-14 involves multiple re-exposure steps to sensitize the unsensitized grains.

In late 1936, Agfacolor Neu was launched, Agfa having overcome earlier difficulties with color sensitivity problems. This film had the dye couplers incorporated into the emulsion, making processing simpler than for Kodachrome.

Early color negative film had many shortcomings, including the high cost of the film, processing and printing, the mediocre color quality, rapid fading and discoloration of highlights of some types of print that became noticeable after several years. Amateurs who owned projection equipment used reversal films extensively because the cost of projection equipment and slide film was offset by not having to pay for prints. Eventually, print quality improved and prices decreased, and, by the 1970s, color negative film and color prints had largely displaced slides as the primary method of amateur photography.

Until about 1995, color transparency was preferred for publication because of the films' higher contrast and resolution, and was widely used in commercial and advertising photography, reportage, sports, stock and nature photography. Digital media gradually replaced transparency film.

== Film types ==
In motion picture film (like Super 8, Regular 8, and 16mm), one can find both color reversal film and black and white reversal. In still film (like 35mm, 120, 110, 620, etc.), the most common reversal film is color reversal; black and white reversal film also exists for still film but it is less common.

=== Color reversal film ===
All color reversal film sold today is developed with the E-6 process. The non-substantive Kodachrome films, the last of which was discontinued in 2009, were processed with the K-14 process.

Polaroid produced an instant slide film called Polachrome. It was packaged in cassettes like normal 35mm film. A separate processing unit was used to develop it after exposure.

=== Black and white reversal film ===
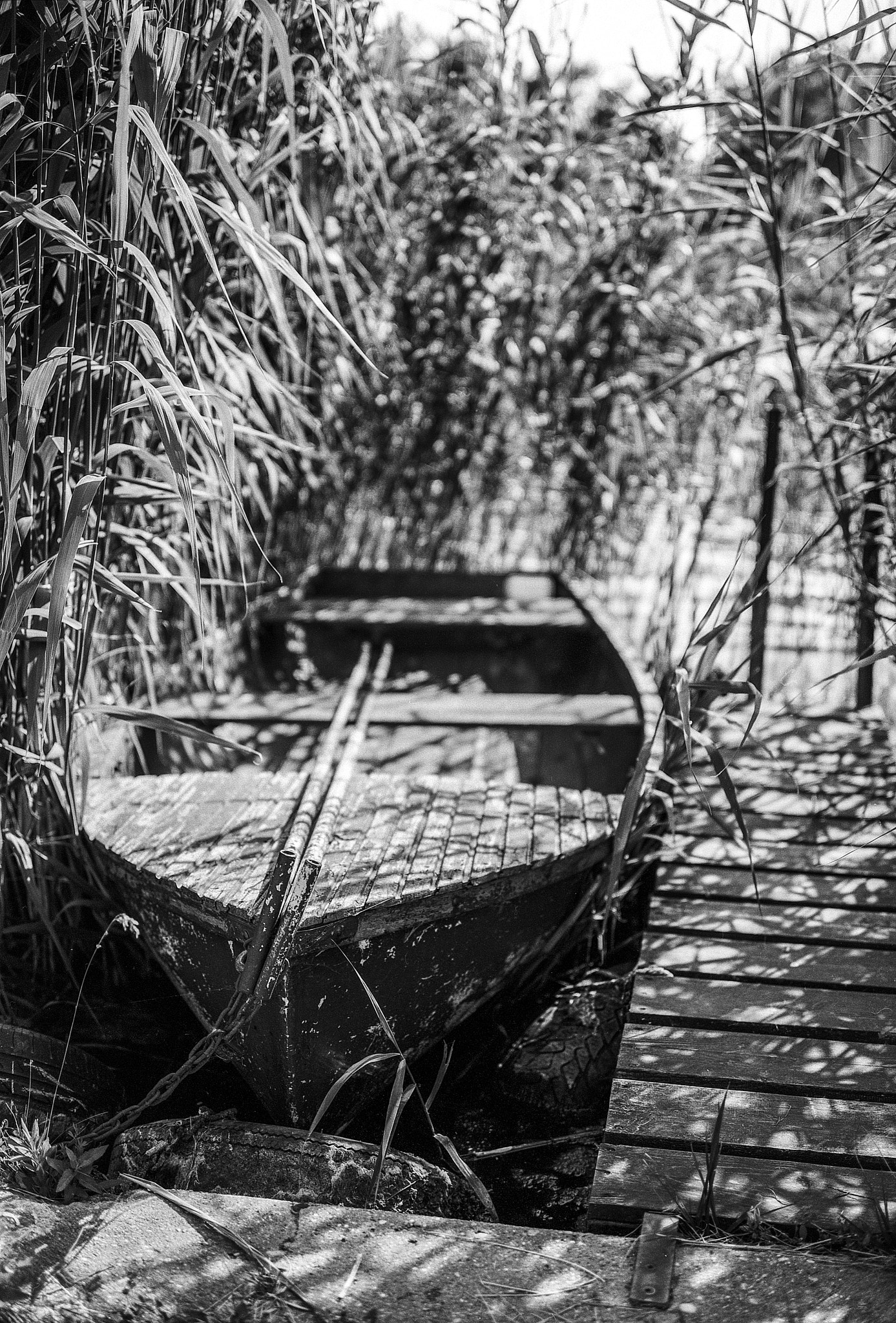
Picture of a boat taken on Fomapan R 100 black-and-white reversal film

Black-and-white transparencies can be made directly with some modern black-and-white films, which normally yield negatives. The negative image is developed but not fixed. The negative image is removed by bleaching with a solution of potassium permanganate or potassium dichromate in dilute sulfuric acid, which is removed by washing and a clearing bath containing sodium metabisulfite or potassium metabisulfite. The remaining silver halide salts are re-exposed to light, developed and fixed, and the film is washed and dried.

Black-and-white transparencies were once popular for presentation of lecture materials using 3¼"×4" (3¼" square in the UK) glass-mounted slides. Such positive black-and-white projection is now rarely done, except in motion pictures. Even where black-and-white positives are currently used, the process to create them typically uses an internegative with standard processing instead of a chemical reversal process.

Black-and-white reversal films are less common than color reversal films.

- Agfa-Gevaert discontinued its Agfa Scala 200x Professional black-and-white reversal film. This could be developed with their proprietary Scala process.
- The Adox company released Scala 160 in 2017, a black and white reversal film based on Agfa's discontinued Scala.
- The Foma company of the Czech Republic produces one of only remaining dedicated black-and-white reversal film for 35 mm stills, Fomapan R 100, which is also available in movie film formats.
- Kodak and Foma currently produce kits for reversal processing.
- Kodak formerly offered a kit ("Direct Positive Film Developing Outfit") for reversal processing of its now-discontinued Panatomic X film, which doubled the effective film speed from 32 to 64. The bleaching bath used potassium dichromate and sodium bisulfate; the redeveloper was a fogging developer, and so unstable that its shelf-life after mixing was only slightly longer than the amount of time needed to process a single roll. This was replaced with a "T-Max Direct Positive Film Developing Outfit", which uses potassium permanganate and sulfuric acid in the bleach. In this kit, the fogging redeveloper is stable, but the bleach is not, with a shelf-life, once mixed, of no more than two weeks.
- dr5 Chrome process, which produces black-and-white transparencies from most traditional halide (i.e., non-chromogenic) black-and-white negative films.
- Kodak Tri-X Reversal Film 7266 and Kodak Plus-X Reversal Film 7265 are black-and-white reversal films used for movie-making.
- Ilford has published a reversal process applicable to all current B&W emulsions, but recommended for Pan F+, FP4+, and Delta 100.

== Pros and cons ==
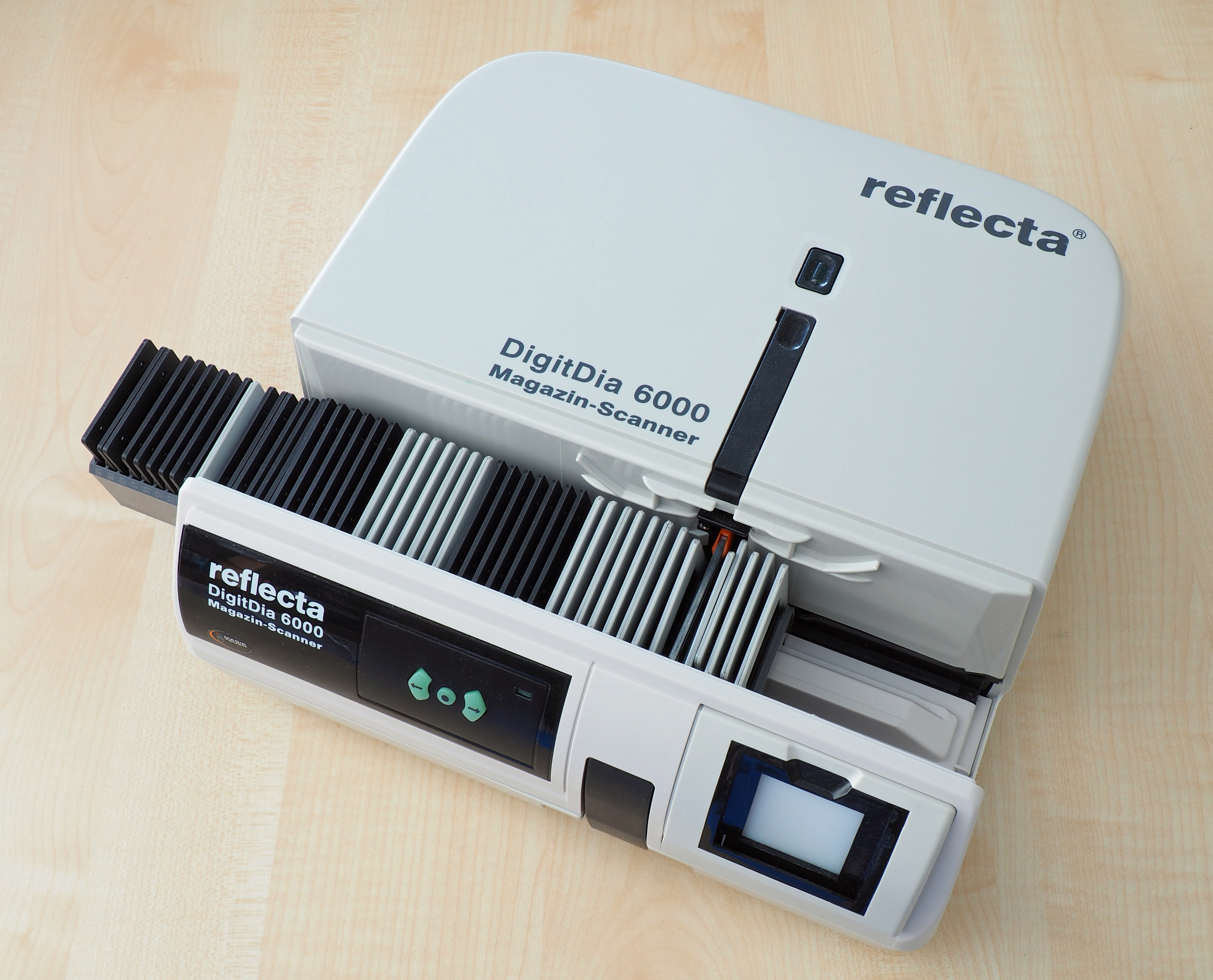
Film scanner

=== Pros ===
- Shows what exactly was captured on film without printing.
- More accurate color translation when digitizing. There is no need for color inversion processes.
- Much faster digitizing on professional scanner machines.
- In general, slide film produces much more vibrant colors than negative film.
- Finer grain, better resolution and sharpness compared to color negative films.

=== Cons ===
- Generally fewer stops of exposure latitude when compared to color negative film.
- Lower film speeds than color negative.
- Typically higher priced.

== Uses ==
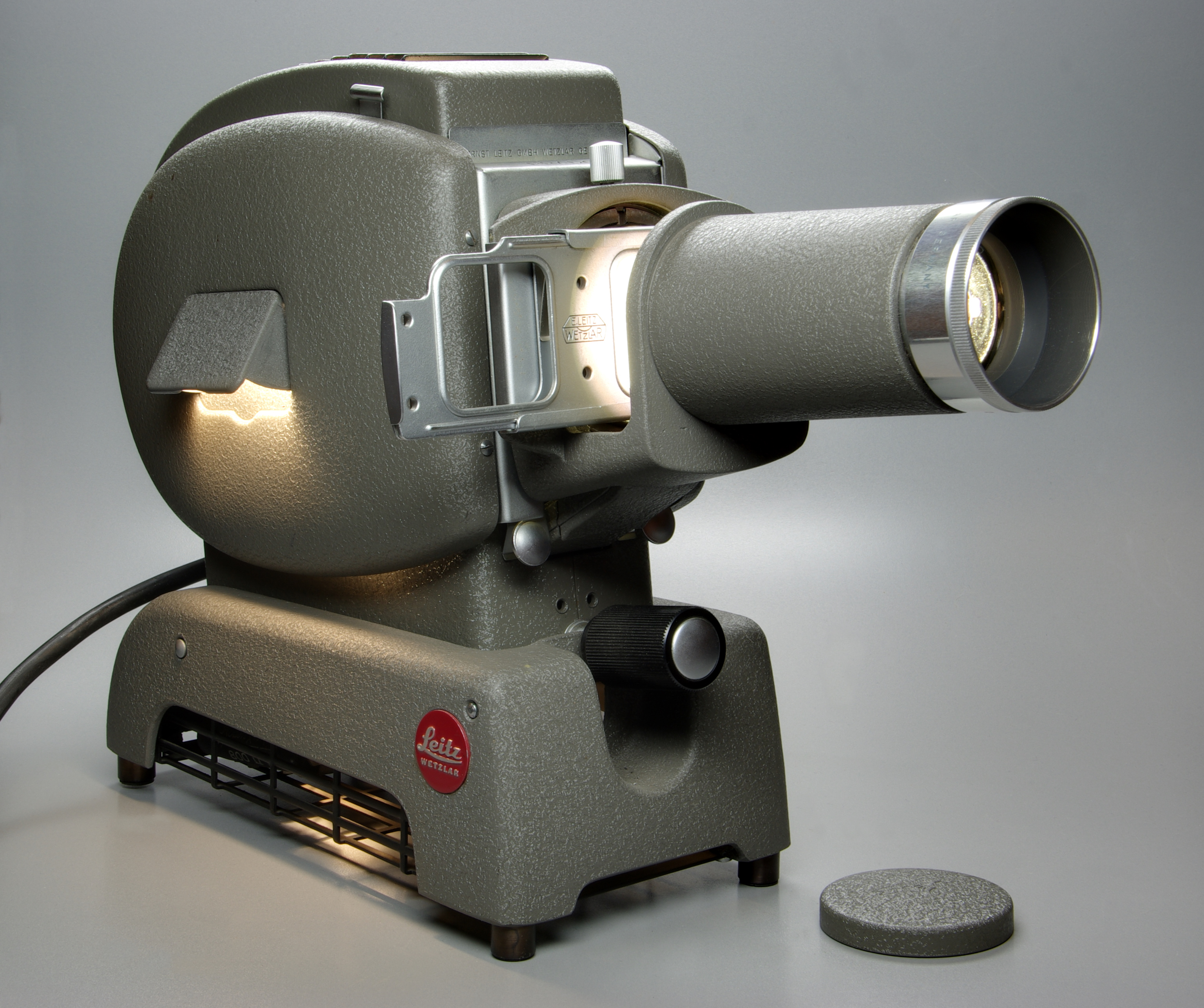
Slide projector Leitz Prado

=== Viewing ===
Finished transparencies are most frequently displayed by projection. Some projectors use a sliding mechanism to manually pull the transparency out of the side of the machine, where it is replaced by the next image. Modern, advanced projectors typically use a carousel that holds a large number of slides; a mechanism automatically pulls a single slide from the carousel and places it in front of the lamp. Small externally lit or battery-powered magnifying viewers are available.

In traditional newsrooms and magazine offices slides were viewed using a lightbox and a loupe, which allowed rapid side by side comparison of similar images.

=== Slide copier ===
A slide copier is a simple optical device that can be fastened to the lens mount of a camera to enable slide duplicates to be made. Whilst these devices were formerly used to make duplicates on to slide film, they are often now used in conjunction with digital cameras to digitize images from film-based transparencies. This method usually gives better resolution than using attachments for digital A4 flat-bed scanners.

The devices are typically about 30 cm long, and screw into an intermediate 't-mount' attached to the camera. The lens in the copier does not need to be complex, because the systems are usually stopped down to small f numbers (e.g. for the Makinon Zoom Unit, f/16 at 1:1 magnification, falling to f/22 at 3:1 magnification), and the object and image distances are similar, so that many aberrations are minimized.

=== Gallery ===
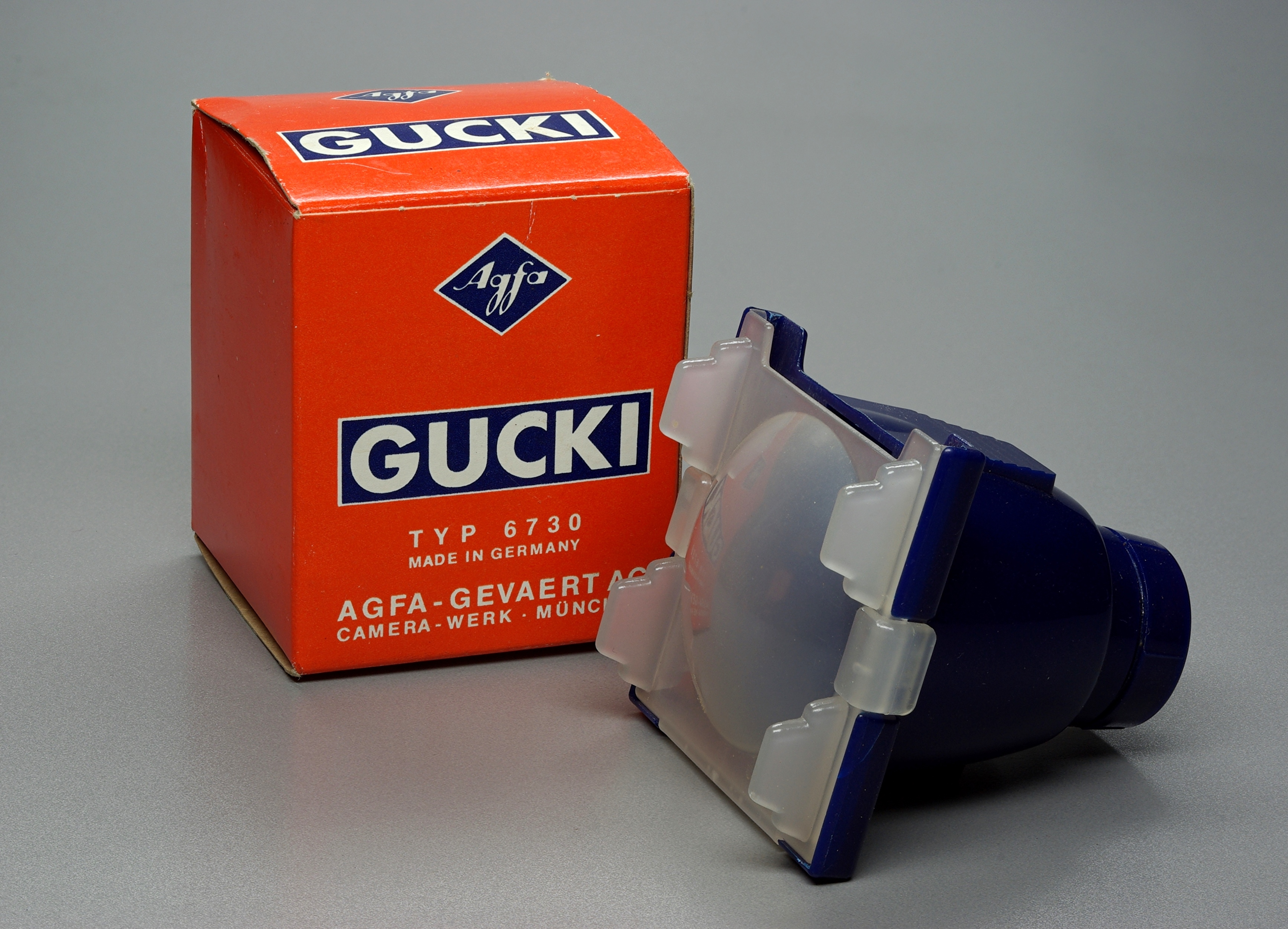
Slide viewer

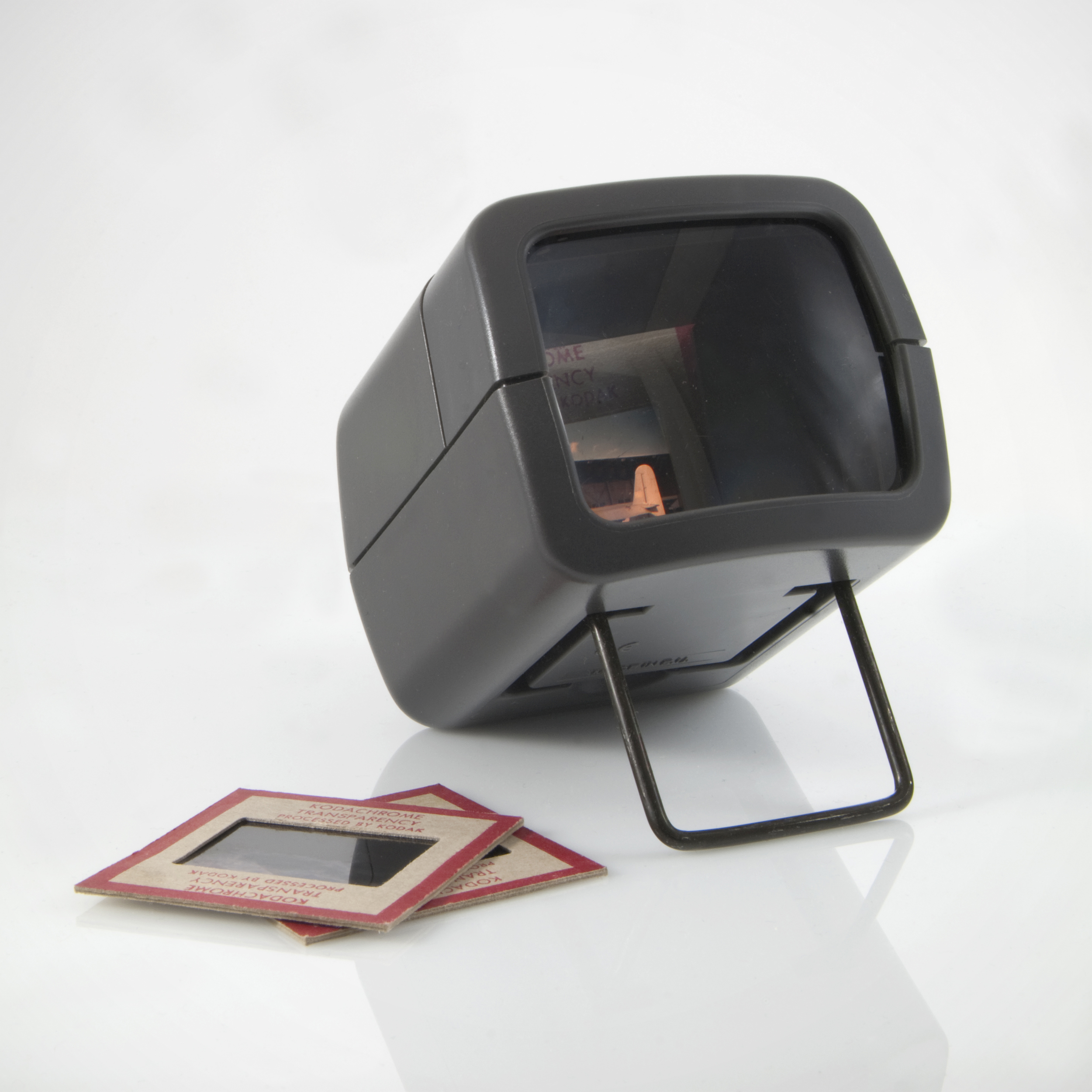
Slide viewer

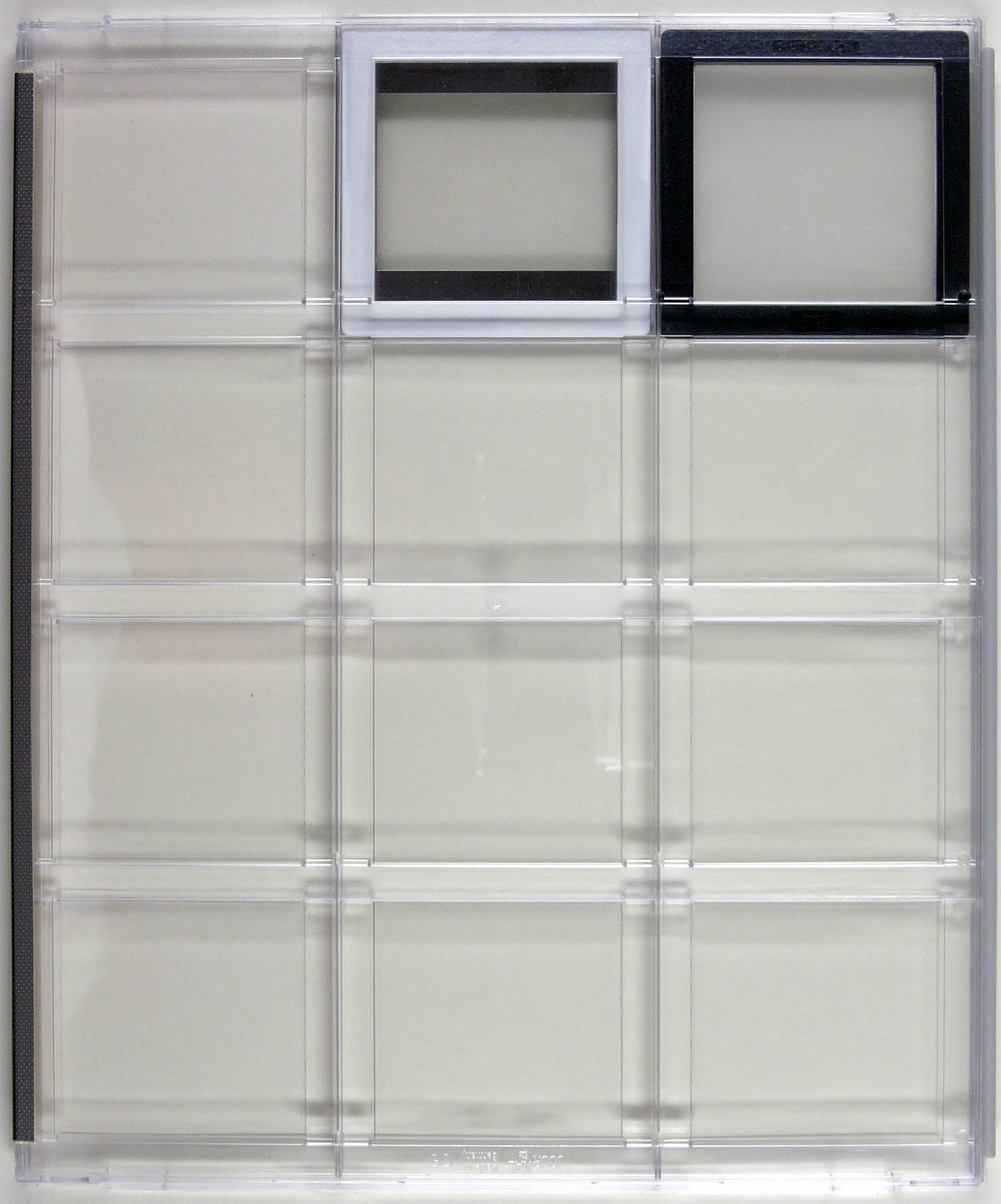
Slide archive box

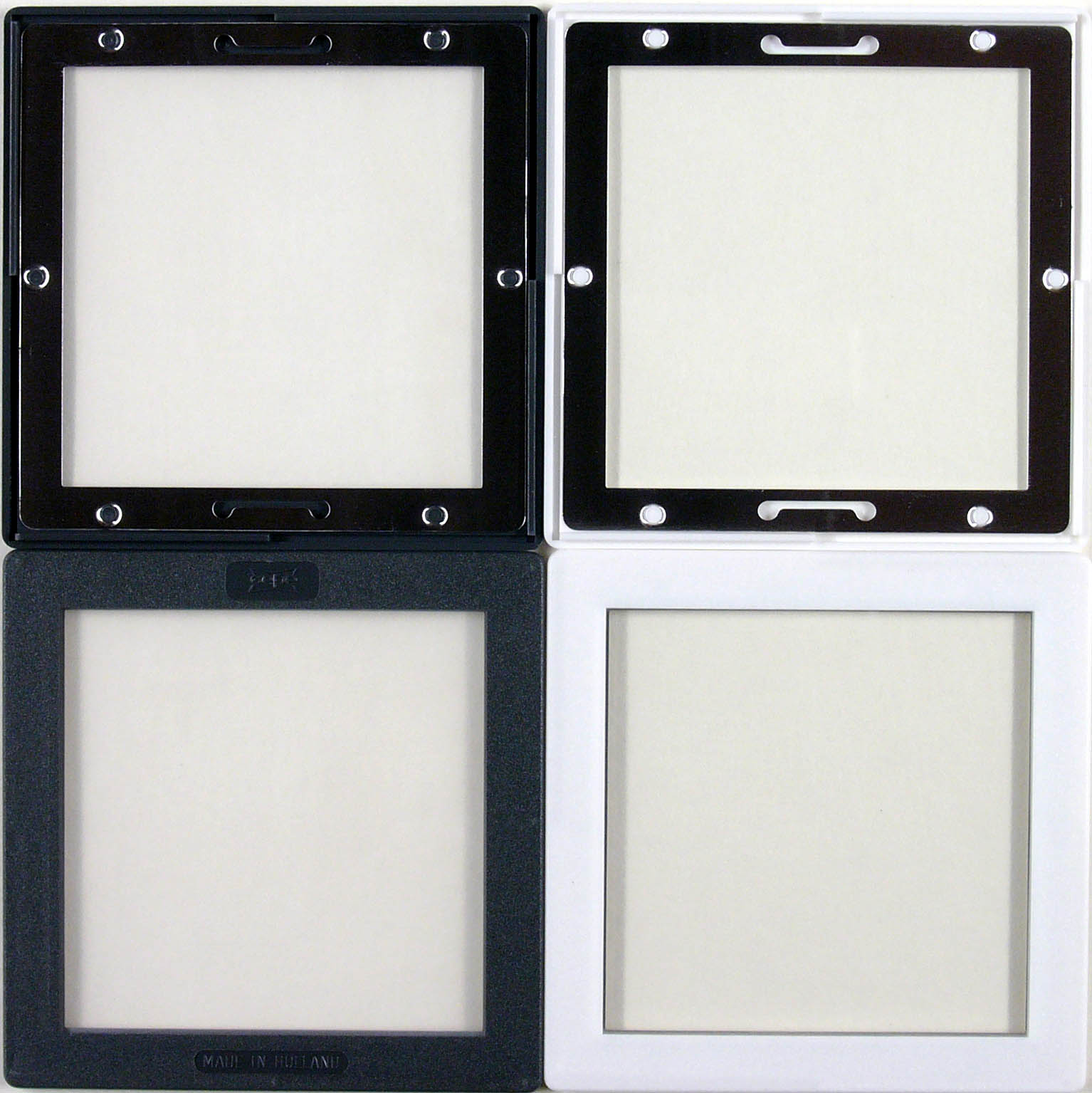
Slide frame 6×6 cm

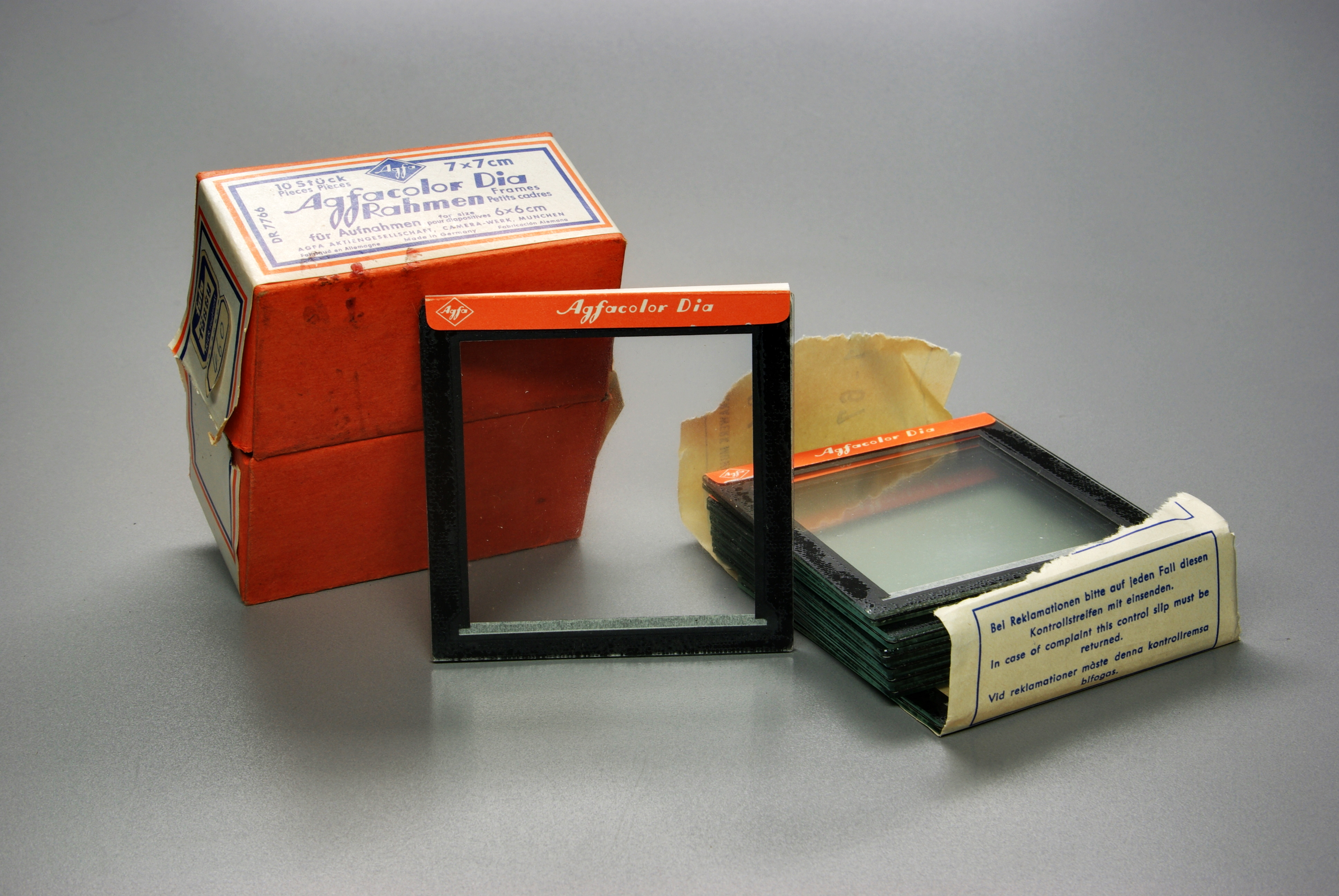
Slide frames 6×6 centimeters (2.4 in)

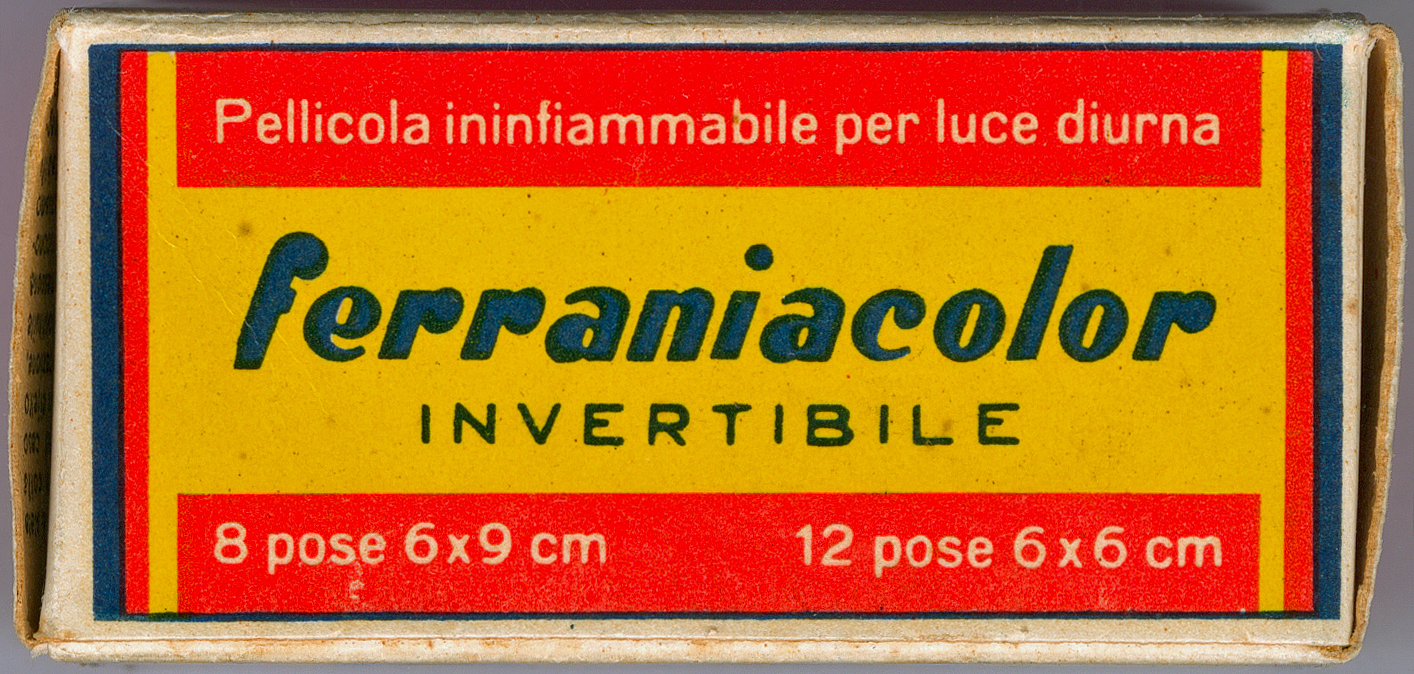
A type 120 reversal film from the mid-1950s: the Italian Ferraniacolor

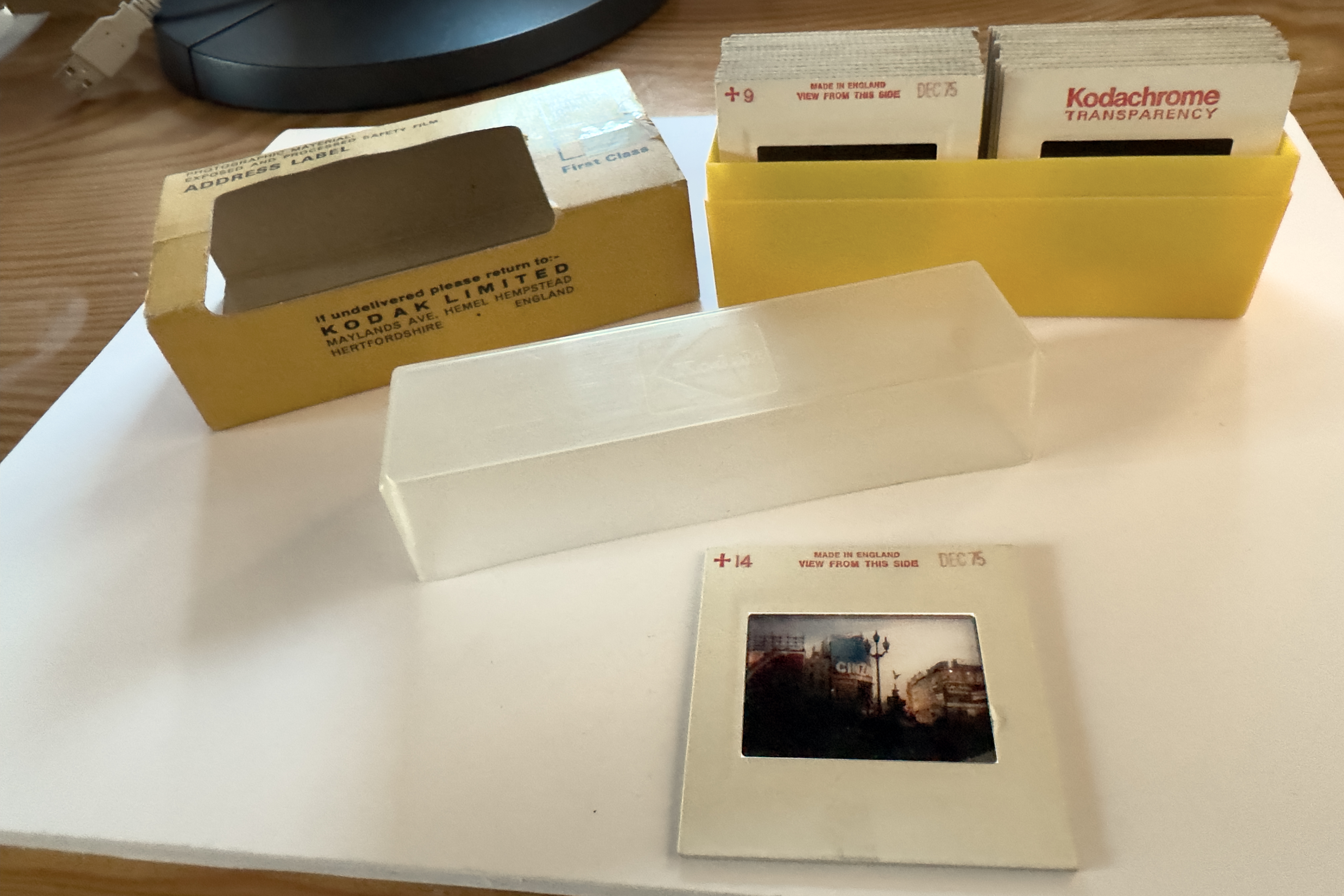
Kodak box for classic Kodak cardboard frames for 35 mm slides (Year 1975)

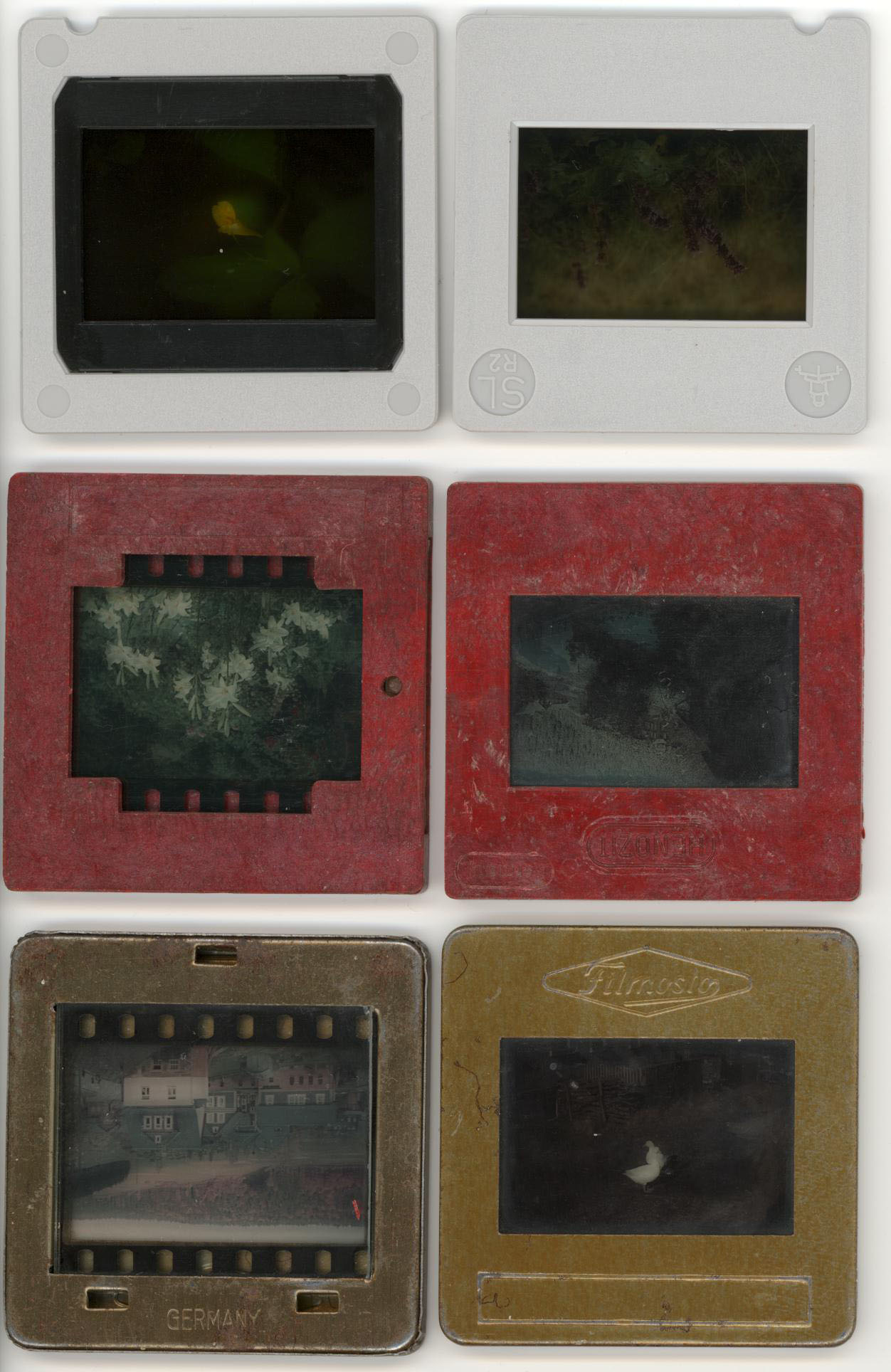
Slide frames, 1940 (metal or card) to 1985 (plastic)

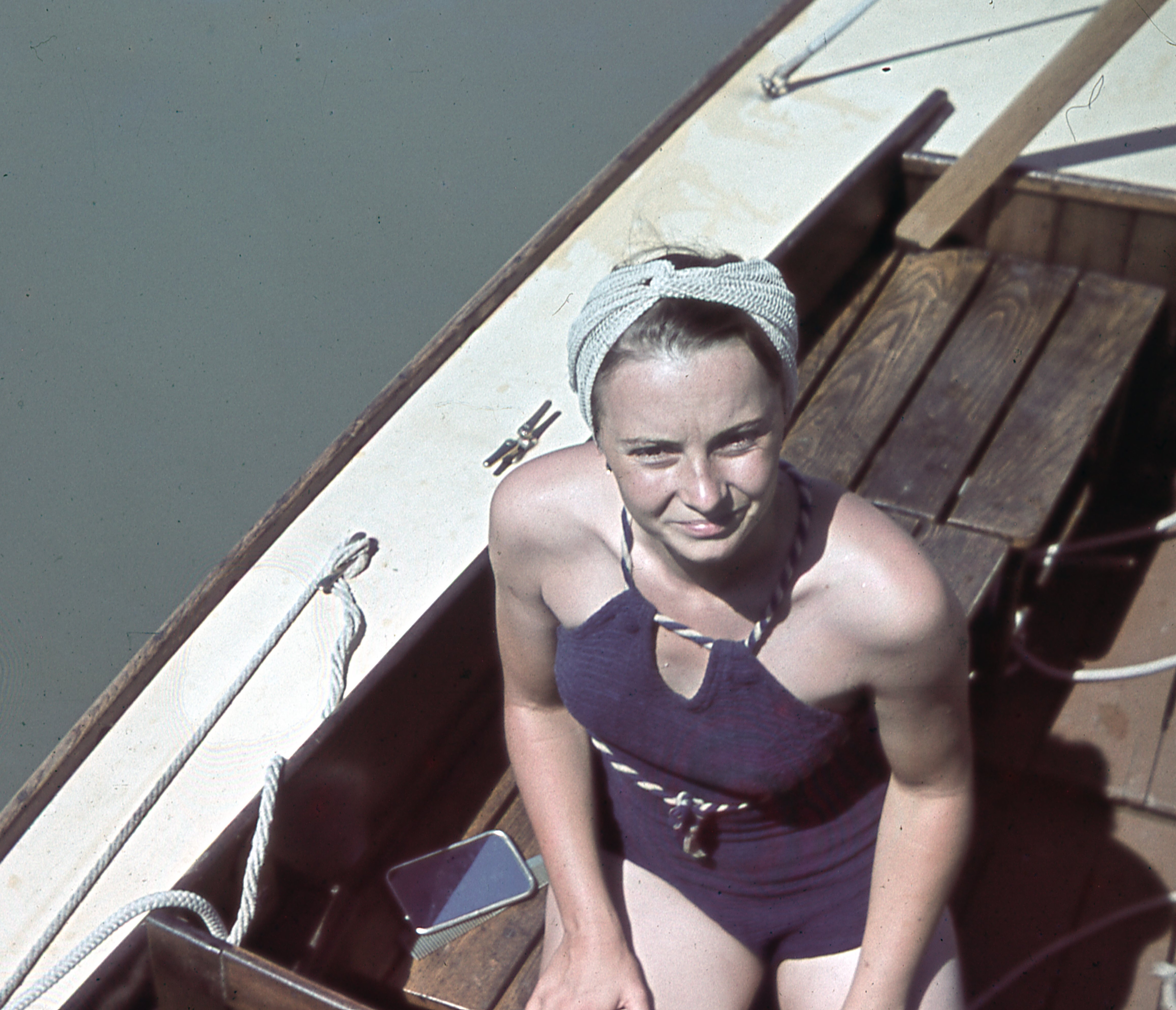
Agfacolor slide dated 1939

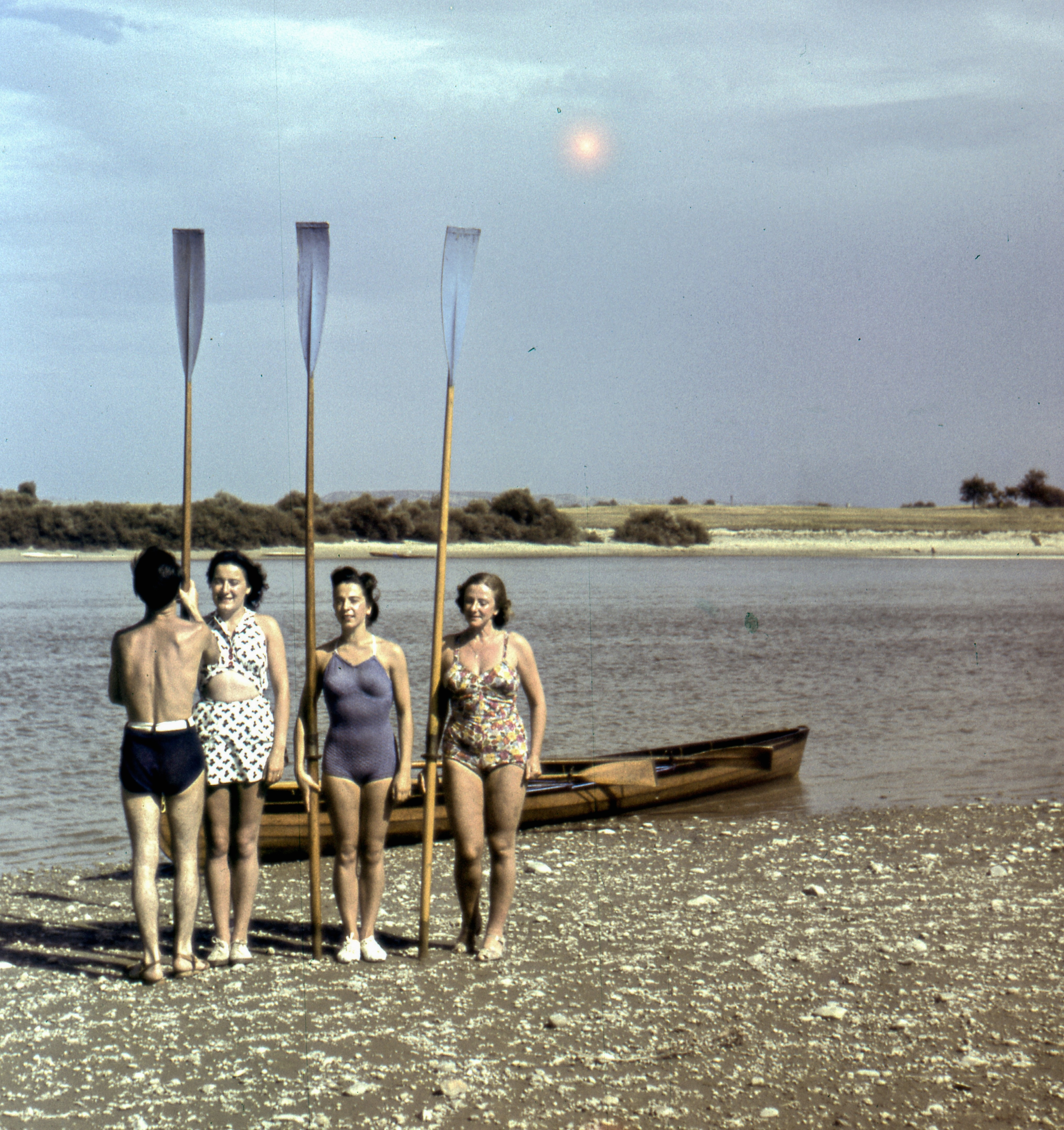
Agfacolor slide dated 1942

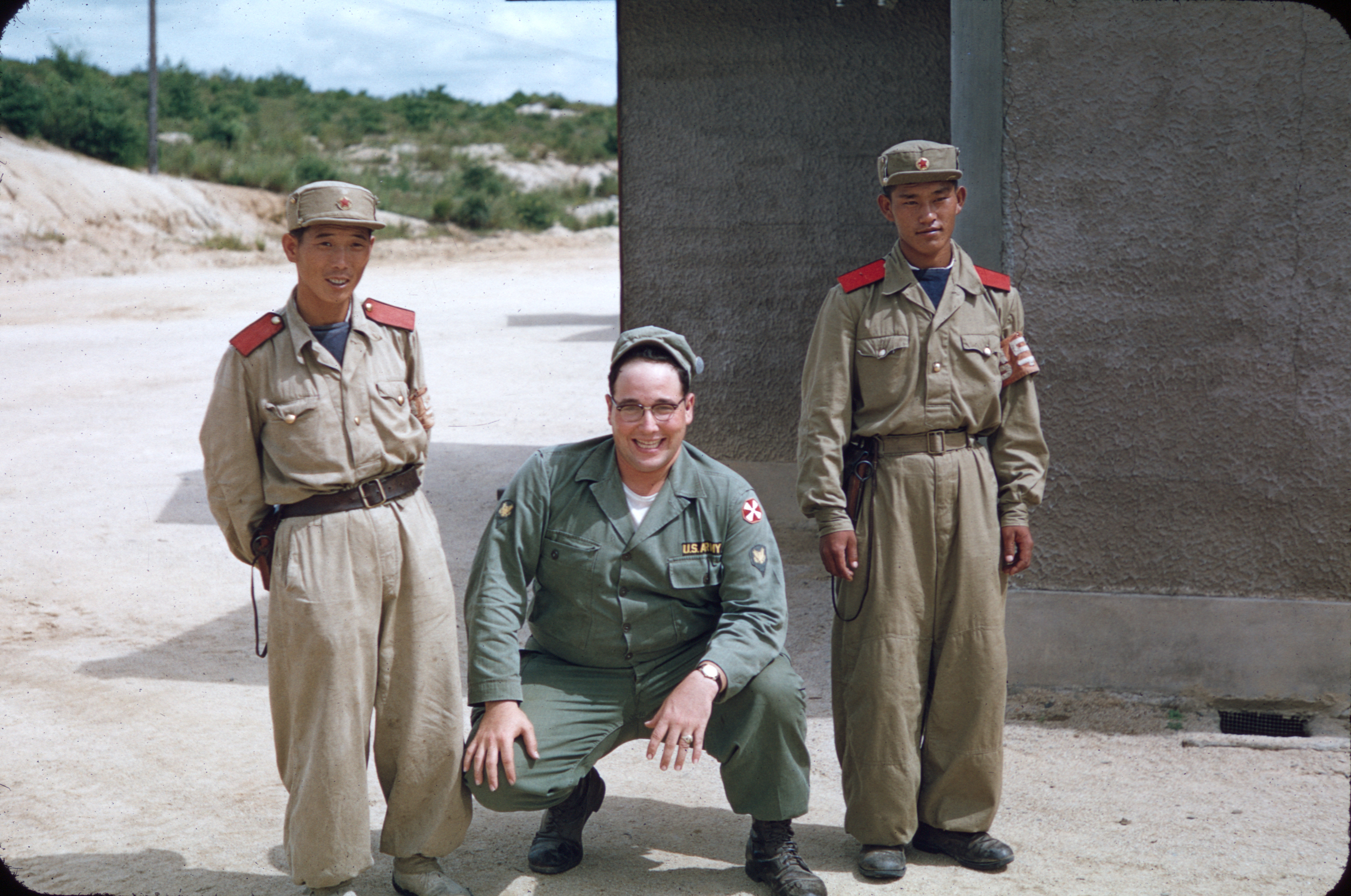
A U.S. soldier poses with North Korean soldiers in this Kodachrome slide from 1956

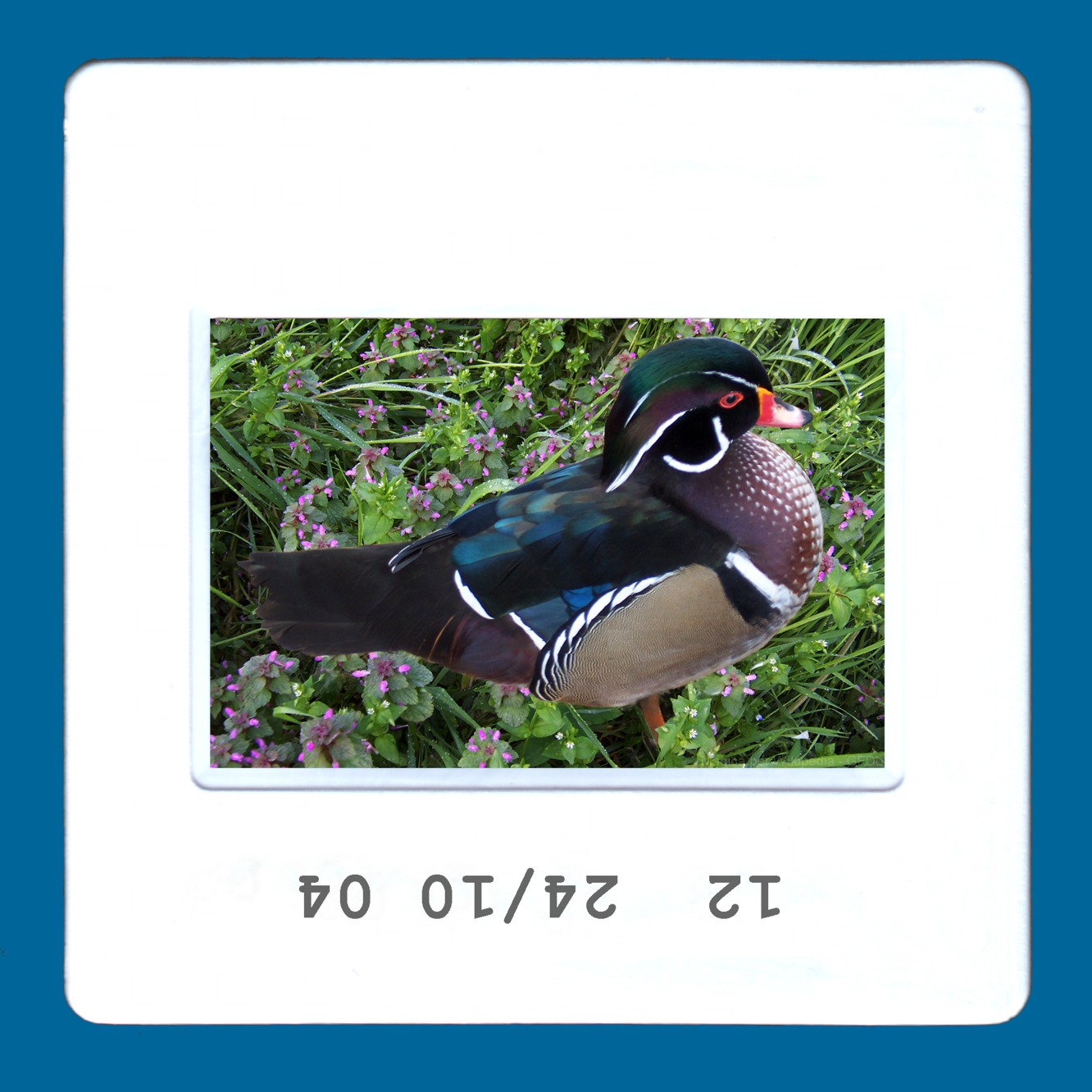
A positive image in a slide from 2004

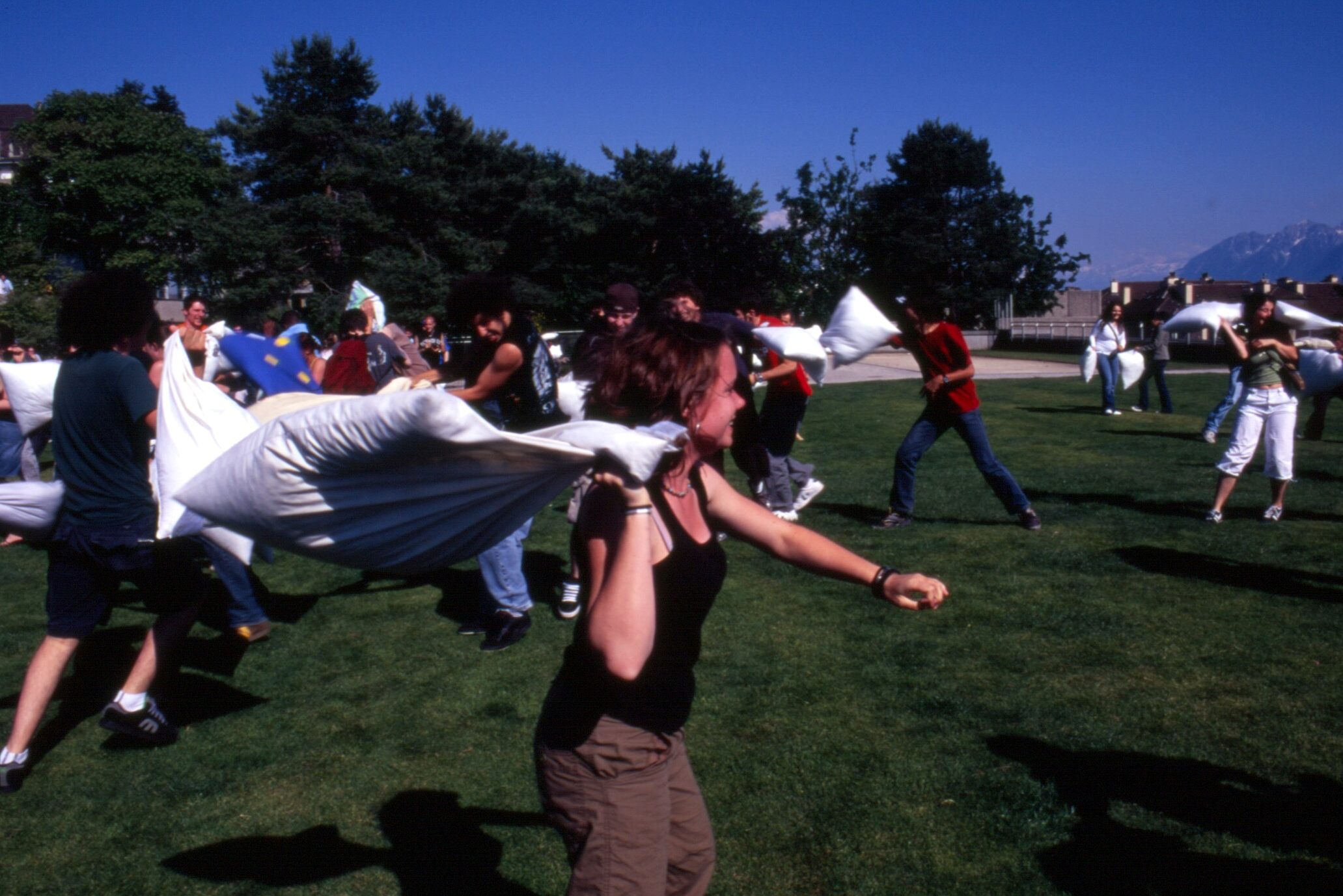
The typical high-contrast appearance of a Fuji Velvia slide image

== Notable films ==
Films notably shot on reversal film include

- Martin (1978) - Shot on color reversal stock.
- Buffalo '66 (1998) - Shot entirely on color 35mm Eastman Ektachrome 160T 5239 reversal film.
- Pi (1998) - Shot entirely on black & white 16mm Eastman Tri-X 200 and Plus-X reversal film.
- Da 5 Bloods (2020) - Select scenes shot on color 16mm Ektachrome reversal film.
- Poor Things (2023) - Select scenes shot on color 35mm Ektachrome reversal film.

== See also ==
- Filmstrip
- Slide library
- Slide show
- View-Master
- Transparency (projection)
