= List of photographic films =

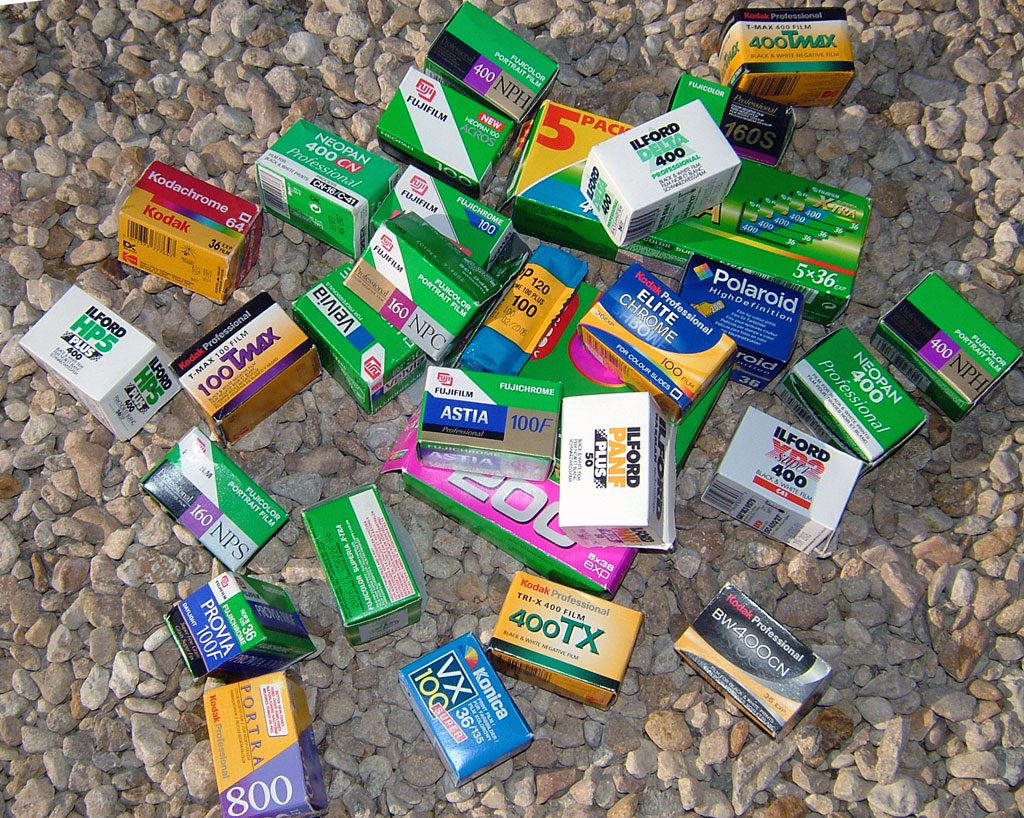
Various films in their boxes

This is a list of currently available photographic films in a still camera film format. This includes recently discontinued films that remain available from stock at main suppliers. Films are listed by brand name. Still camera photographic films no longer in production (or available) are included in the list of discontinued photographic films. Films for movie making are included in the list of motion picture film stocks.

Key:

In production (according to manufacturer)	Discontinued, stock only	Planned re-introduction or new film

- P – Polyester base
- T – Triacetate base
- SUC-27/39 – Single use camera with 27/39 exposures.

== ADOX ==
The current rights to the historic ADOX name were obtained in 2003 by Fotoimpex of Berlin, Germany, a company founded in 1992 to import photographic films and papers from the former Eastern Bloc. ADOX (Fotoimpex) subsequently established a film factory in Bad Sarrow outside Berlin to convert and package films, papers and chemicals. In February 2015 they acquired use of the former Ilford Imaging (Ciba Geigy) machine E, medium scale coating line at Marly, Switzerland. From 2017 to 2018 they doubled the size of the Bad Sarrow factory to be able to install film coating capability (still in progress in 2024) and medium scale photochemistry manufacture.

The ADOX name traces back to the oldest photographic film manufacturer in the world, started in 1860 in Germany. In the 1970s, Dupont the owners of the Adox brand sold the recipes and machinery of their B&W films to Fotokemika in Croatia who continued to produce the films under the Efke brand. The films were subsequently imported by Fotoimpex and sold as ADOX CHS Art thus re-uniting the ADOX name with the films. After Fotokemikas closure in 2012, ADOX CHS II was produced for ADOX using modern cascade coating and since then the range of products has been expanded.

=== Black and white negative films ===
Make	Name	Dates	Base	ISO	Process	Type	Details	Origin	Formats
ADOX	CMS 20 II PRO	available	P	20	B&W	Print	Agfa-Gevaert Copex HDP (High Definition Pan) (Now branded as EPM Imagelink HD) microfilm converted & packaged by ADOX (See also SPUR UR). "No other film is sharper, no other film is more finegrained, no other film resolves more lines per mm (up to 800 L /mm)." Needs special developer to manage extreme contrast. As of 2019 120 is out of stock.	Belgium/ Germany	135–36, 120, 4x5"
ADOX	HR-50	2018-	P	50	B&W	Print	Super-panchromatic ultra fine grain - Agfa-Gevaert Aviphot 80 modified to enhance usability. May also be used as an infra-red film with suitable filtration. Launched at Photokina in September 2018.	Belgium/ Germany	135–36, 120, 4x5"
ADOX	CHS 100 II	2013-2016 & 2018-	P	100	B&W	Print	Ortho-panchromatic emulsion from 1950s re-introduced as a modern cascade coating for ADOX (Fotoimpex) in 2013. Following test coating at Marly, sheet film was re-introduced in 2018 and 135 format in 2020. 120 film in 2023.	Germany	135–36, 120, Sheet film

=== Black and white reversal (slide) films ===
Make	Name	Dates	Base	ISO	Process	Type	Details	Origin	Formats
ADOX	Scala 50	2019-	P	50	B&W	Slide	Same film as the HR-50 but rebranded to show its suitability for reversal process. Super-panchromatic ultra fine grain – Agfa-Gevaert Aviphot 80 modified to enhance usability.	Belgium/ Germany	135–36

=== Color negative films ===
Make	Name	Dates	Base	ISO	Process	Type	Details	Origin	Formats
ADOX	Color Mission Helios	TBC	?	3	C-41	Print	Upcoming simplified 4 layer color film with low sensitivity.	Germany	135–36, Sheet film
ADOX	Color Mission 200	02.2022-	?	200	C-41	Print	One batch of color film co-researched with and coated for ADOX with finite supply. Vibrant colors. Proceeds to fund R&D for in-house production of a color film expected to take 4 years.	Germany	135–36

== Agfa-Gevaert ==
Agfa-Gevaert is headquartered in Mortsel, Belgium and following the sale of its consumer films division (See AgfaPhoto), now only manufactures commercial films; 'Aviphot' for aerial photography and 'Copex' archival microfilms (since 2013 Copex films are branded 'Imagelink' for Eastman Park Micrographics). Some of these films are however repackaged for consumer use by Maco under its Rollei brand and by Japan Camera Hunter, Silberra and ADOX.

Make	Name	Dates	Base	ISO	Process	Type	Details	Origin	Formats
Agfa	Copex Rapid	available	P	50	B&W	Print	Agfa Copex Rapid A.H.U. (Anti Halation Underlayer) (EPM Imagelink HS) is a high resolution black and white Panchromatic microfilm. (Converted by Maco Photo Products) See also SPUR DSX.	Belgium & Germany	135–36, 120

== AgfaPhoto ==
The Agfa consumer film division with its plant in Leverkusen, Germany was spun off by Agfa-Gevaert into a new company AgfaPhoto in 2004. At buy out the firm was split into a holding company Agfa-Photo Holding GMBH (licenses) and manufacturing company Agfa-Photo GMBH (Leverkusen). The manufacturing company went bankrupt in 7 months resulting in the closure of the Leverkusen plant in 2005. The holding company was unaffected and retains a trademark license from Agfa-Gevaert for the use of the AgfaPhoto brand and 'red dot' logo on products having a photographic application. Since 2005 these rights for consumer film products have been sub-licensed to Lupus Imaging & Media. The color negative and slide films were made by Ferrania from 2005, whilst black and white films were converted by Ferrania from stored master rolls of Agfastock. Ferrania closed in 2009. Replacement color films were supplied by Fujifilm until this contract ended in early 2018, ending the sale of color film under the AgfaPhoto brand. Black & White films were replaced by new films made by Harman Technology after 2013.

=== Black and white negative films ===
Make	Name	Dates	Base	ISO	Process	Type	Details	Origin	Formats
Agfa Photo	APX 100	2013-	T	100	B&W	Print	General purpose panchromatic film. Similar to Kentmere PAN 100. (A film nearer the original Agfa APX 100 is ADOX Silvermax/Scala).	UK	135–36
Agfa Photo	APX 200	2026-	T	200	B&W	Print	General purpose panchromatic film. Similar to Kentmere PAN 200.	UK	135-36
Agfa Photo	APX 400	2013-	T	400	B&W	Print	General purpose panchromatic film. Similar to Kentmere PAN 400.	UK	135–36

=== Color negative films ===
Make	Name	Dates	Base	ISO	Process	Type	Details	Origin	Formats
Agfa Photo	Color 400	2024-	?	400	C-41	Print	General purpose color film without an orange mask. Probably a FilmoTec emulsion.	Germany	135–24

== Argenti ==
Based in Gijón, Spain, Argenti offer a small range of B&W films, converted from bulk in their own packaging.

Make	Name	Dates	Base	ISO	Process	Type	Details	Origin	Formats
Argenti	Nanotomic X	available	P	32	B&W	Print	Technical monochrome film, with fine grain and high resolution, (600 pairs of lines per millimeter), polyester base of 130 um. Probably an Agfa-Gevaert microfilm on PET13 base.	Spain	135–36
Argenti	Scale-X	available	T	100	B&W	Print /Slide	Fine grain panchromatic film with a wide tonal scale on a clear triacetate base which can be processed as a negative (ISO100) or reverse processed (Scala) as a slide (ISO 160). Exposure Index of 100 - 800 ISO. Claimed to be original Agfa Scala. Similar characteristics to ADOX Scala/Silvermax.	Spain	135–36
Argenti	Pan-X	available	T	100	B&W	Print	Panchromatic film on a 135 μm triacetate base. Identical structure to Wolfen UN 54.	Spain	135–36
Argenti	ARF+ Reporter Film Plus	available	T	400	B&W	Print	Wolfen N 74 Plus high speed black-and-white panchromatic camera film for both outdoor and indoor usage with wide exposure latitude, 135 μm triacetate base.	Germany /Spain	135–36

== Arista EDU ==
Arista EDU Ultra is a budget range of Black & White films produced for Freestyle Photographic, USA in three speeds (ISO 100, 200, 400) in 135, 120 and sheet film formats. They are currently the same as the equivalent speed films produced by Foma. 135 films are not DX coded.

== Bergger ==
Based in France Bergger was established in 1995 and offers a single B&W film manufactured on their behalf; Pancro 400 introduced in 2015 replacing BRF400.

Make	Name	Dates	Base	ISO	Process	Type	Details	Origin	Formats
Bergger	Pancro 400	2015-	T / P	400	B&W	Print	General purpose panchromatic B&W film, using two emulsions (Silver-Bromide/Iodide) that differ in grain size in order to achieve a wide exposure range. 135 (T base), 120 and sheet film (P base).	Germany	135–36, 120, Sheet film

== CatLABS ==
CatLABS is a photographic retailer in Boston, USA. Two own branded films were launched in 2019.

Make	Name	Dates	Base	ISO	Process	Type	Details	Origin	Formats
CatLABS	X FILM 80	2019-	T?	80*	B&W	Print	Traditional black and white film with fine grain, moderate contrast and deep tonal range. *EI of 80, can also be shot at 100 ISO. Supplied in the same formats as Shanghai GP3, CatLABS confirmed that the roll films are converted by Shanghai after GP3 branded tape was found on rolls.	China	120, 4x5", 8x10"
CatLABS	X FILM 100 Color	2025-	T?	100	Color	Print	Unique color film emulsion offering superb sharpness, soft tones and vivid color palette. Characterized by distinct color coupler structure, contrast and tonal range. Balanced for daylight but suitable for low light and long exposures; near neutral color balance beyond 10 seconds under tungsten/artificial light. Fine grain, wide exposure latitude, dries flat with near-clear base ideal for scanning. Process C41 (or E6 for high-contrast positive slides). 35mm coming soon.	China	35mm*, 120, 4x5"
CatLABS	X FILM 320	2019-	T	320	B&W	Print	Medium-speed film, with distinct grain quality, contrast and tonal range, wider exposure latitude up to EI of 1600. Hand rolled onto reloadable cassettes, film edge markings state '5222' indicating this to be Kodak Double-X film stock.	USA	135
CatLABS	X FILM 320 Pro	2022-	P	320	B&W	Print	Medium-speed film, with distinct grain quality, contrast and tonal range, wide exposure latitude up to EI of 1600.	USA/EU	135, 120

== CineStill ==
Based in the US, CineStill was established in 2012 and converts Eastman Kodak motion picture stock into 135 and 120 still camera formats. Color stock is suitable for C-41 process in labs as it is produced by Eastman Kodak under contract without the normal Remjet backing, a separate lubricating and Anti-halation backing used to protect the film in motion picture cameras. This means that the films lack the normal anti-halation layer also found in still camera film resulting in a characteristic 'glow' in highlights due to the internal reflection back through the film in the camera.

=== Black and white films ===
Make	Name	Dates	Base	ISO	Process	Type	Details	Origin	Formats
CineStill	bwXX	2015-	T	250	B&W	Print	A classic B&W film stock left relatively unchanged since its release in 1959 for still and motion picture use (Kodak Double-X 5222). Medium format was added in May 2021.	USA	135–36, 120

=== Color negative films ===
Make	Name	Dates	Base	ISO	Process	Type	Details	Origin	Formats
CineStill	50D	2015-	T	50	C-41	Print	Daylight balanced color negative film (Kodak Vision3 50D 5203).	USA	135–36, 120
CineStill	400D	2022-	T	400	C-41	Print	Daylight balanced color negative film featuring a soft color palette with natural saturated color and rich, warm skin tones. Stated to be 'not a current film stock but based on advanced technology found in motion picture emulsions' but is similar to Kodak Vision3 250D 5207 – ISO 250 in native ECN-2 chemistry, without the remjet layer. A 'film backer' supported its production in 3 formats for delivery by summer 2022.	USA	135–36, 120, 4x5
CineStill	800T	2013-	T	800	C-41	Print	Tungsten balanced color negative film (Kodak Vision3 500T 5219 – ISO 500 in native ECN-2 chemistry).	USA	135–36, 120
CineStill	Red Rum	2021-	T	200	C-41	Print	Reverse rolled CineStill 800T film to give 'red-scale' effect.	USA	120

== dubblefilm ==
A range of 'creative' color films launched in 2017 in conjunction with mobile app 'dubble'. The films were produced by Kono! a small European analogue photographic company based in Austria. In 2019 they announced a tie up with Revelog also in Austria, films will now offer 36 exp, effects are improved and some films were renamed.

=== Black and white films ===
Make	Name	Dates	Base	ISO	Process	Type	Details	Origin	Formats
dubblefilm	Daily black&white	2020-	T	400	B&W	Print	Black and white panchromatic film with soft and clean tones. Cassettes are not DX coded.	TBC	135–36

=== Color negative films ===
Make	Name	Dates	Base	ISO	Process	Type	Details	Origin	Formats
dubblefilm	Apollo	2017-	T	200	C-41	Print	Creative color film with a that produces unconventional colors. Named Moonstruck to 2019.	Austria	135–36
dubblefilm	Bubblegum	2018-	T	200	C-41	Print	Creative color film with added tone to give candy colors.	Austria	135–36
dubblefilm	Jelly	2018-	T	200	C-41	Print	Creative color film with green, blue and orange hues top to bottom of frame.	Austria	135–36
dubblefilm	Pacific	2018-	T	200	C-41	Print	Creative color film with added tone to give deep colors inspired by the freshness of a post-monsoon rain. Named Monsoonto 2019.	Austria	135–36
dubblefilm	Solar	2017-	T	200	C-41	Print	Creative color film with light leaks Named Sunstroke to 2019.	Austria	135–36
dubblefilm	Stereo	2019-	T	200	C-41	Print	Creative color film with full frame red tint and fades to blue for the final part.	Austria	135–36
dubblefilm	Daily Color	2020-	T	400	C-41	Print	color film with neutral clean tones. Cassettes are not DX coded.	Austria	135–27

== Ferrania ==
FILM Ferrania s.r.l. is a photographic film manufacturing company located in Ferrania (Liguria), Italy. Following closure of the original Ferrania factory in 2009 the company was re-founded in 2013 following a kickstarter campaign and support from the regional government to build a new film manufacturing base using the former Ferrania Research Laboratory (L.R.F.) and its narrow coater. Although initial plans focused on re-introducing a color slide film, FILM Ferrania commenced manufacturing a B&W still film in February 2017 based on P30, a classic 1960s motion picture film stock, being a simpler proposition. Production of the P30 'Alpha' ceased in mid 2018 due to further works to the L.R.F building and need to refine production to reduce wastage and P30 production did not recommence until late 2019. Orto, a new Orthochromatic film was launched in 2023 followed by P33, a 160-ISO panchromatic film with more flexibility than P30, in 2024.

Make	Name	Dates	Base	ISO	Process	Type	Details	Origin	Formats
FILM Ferrania	Orto	04.2023-	T	50	B&W	Print	Orthochromatic film, similar characteristics to P30 but sensitised for blue/green colors associated with Ortho films of the 1920s.	Italy	135–36, 120
FILM Ferrania	P30	11.2019-	T	80	B&W	Print	Classic 1960's B&W panchromatic motion picture film for still photography. Production version.	Italy	135-36 & 30m, 120
FILM Ferrania	P33	02.2024-	T	160	B&W	Print	More flexible upgrade of the P30 panchromatic film.	Italy	135-36

== Film Photography Project ==
Established in 2009 by Michael Raso, Film Photography Project (FPP) sources a variety of still films including those originally made for technical, motion pictures, industrial or aerial applications for creative purposes.

=== Black and white films ===
Make	Name	Dates	Base	ISO	Process	Type	Details	Origin	Formats
FPP	Super Positive Film	available	T/P	0.8	B&W	Print	Orthochromatic, low contrast, low speed BW positive film. This film is a Dactylographic film, used in the study of finger prints. This film will produce a BW positive when processed in standard BW chemistry.		135–24
FPP	Mz3 Fine Grain	available	P	3	B&W	Print	Black and white, very slow speed, blue sensitive film with fine grain.	?	135–24
FPP	Eastman Kodak 5302 Fine Grain	available	P	3	B&W	Print	Blue sensitive positive motion picture film originally designed for direct contact copying titles and mats in motion picture work. Blue sensitive film needs to be shot in daylight or flash/strobe. Avoid yellow filtration and shooting in indoor/tungsten light.	USA	135-24
FPP	X-Ray Film	available	T/P	5-10	B&W	Print	Orthochromatic film with Blue/Green sensitivity, can be processed by inspection under red light.	?	4x5
FPP	Fine Grain Six	available	P	6	B&W	Print	Film intended for making archival black-and-white separation positives from color negative originals (Eastman 2238). Other product applications for this film include special effects, density cover mattes, panchromatic masters from black-and-white negatives, and restoration work.	USA	135–24
FPP	Low ISO Black & White	available	P	6	B&W	Print	This film will produce a film negative and produce very fine grain. This blue-sensitive black-and-white film has very high resolution and incorporates a yellow dye, which is removed during processing, to provide very high sharpness. Blue Sensitive films need to be shot in daylight or using a flash/strobe. Avoid using a yellow filter or shooting in tungsten (indoor) light.	?	135–24
FPP	Blue Sensitive	available	P	6	B&W	Print	Blue-sensitive black-and-white film needs to be shot in daylight or using a flash/strobe. Avoid using a yellow filter or shooting in tungsten (indoor) light.	?	135–24
FPP	Sonic 25 BW Film	available	T?	25	B&W	Print	High contrast, fine grained Orthochromatic blue sensitive film was manufactured for optical sound recording but will produce fine-grain images, for shooting in daylight or with daylight balanced lights.	?	135–24
FPP	Eastman Kodak Hi-Con 2369	available	P	25	B&W	Print	High-contrast, panchromatic film with ultra-high resolving power, excellent definition and amazing sharpness. The primary use of this film was for making silhouette mattes and special fx traveling mattes at motion picture labs. Discontinued by Kodak. DX coded.	USA	135–24
FPP	Eastman Kodak Hi-Fi 2374	available	P	50	B&W	Print	High contrast, panchromatic film designed for recording variable-area sound track negatives with a tungsten light source, and/or producing digital sound track negatives. Includes the words "KODAK Safety Film", the strip number, and year symbol located in the center, along the length of the film every 3-5 frames.	USA	135–24
FPP	Emulsion X	available	T?	100	B&W	Print	Panchromatic film with a gritty, grindy, grainy soft focus vintage look. Has a red tinted, age related, base fog after processing. Unknown origin.	?	135–36
FPP	S 200 ISO	available	T	200	B&W	Print	Surveillance film, the film has a wonderful latitude and is perfect for general use or long exposures.	USA	135–24
FPP	Film Love (Hearts) /Film Love (Shamrocks)	available	?	200	B&W	Print	Surveillance film, with wide exposure latitude, in 'hearts' or 'shamrocks' packaging.	USA	135–24
FPP	Dracula	available	P	64	B&W	Print	Super panchromatic negative fine grain film on a 0.1mm polyester base with a spectral sensitivity to up to 750 nm.	?	135–24, 120
FPP	WolfMan	available	T	100	B&W	Print	Panchromatic film with medium to low grain and high resolving power. Same as FPP Cine 16mm BW 100 film emulsion.	?	135–24, 120, 620
FPP	Frankenstein	available	T	200	B&W	Print	Medium speed, medium grain panchromatic film with great tonal range. Same as FPP Cine 16mm BW film emulsion.	?	135–24, 120, 620, 4x5
FPP	Let It Snow	available	P	100	B&W	Print	Super panchromatic medium speed film, Svema Foto 100.	Belgium	135–24
FPP	Derev Pan 100	available	P	100	B&W	Print	Panchromatic aerial surveillance film with good exposure latitude and extremely sharp fine grain.	Ukraine	135–36
FPP	Derev Pan 200	available	P	200	B&W	Print	Panchromatic aerial surveillance film, moderately red sensitive with terrific separation of green and blue tones and extremely sharp, very good exposure latitude.	Ukraine	135–36
FPP	Derev Pan 400	available	P	400	B&W	Print	Panchromatic aerial surveillance film with good exposure latitude and extremely sharp fine grain.	Ukraine	135–36
FPP	BW 100	available	T	100	B&W	Print	Wolfen UN 54 panchromatic medium speed motion picture stock converted for still film use.	Germany	135–24
FPP	Tasma NK-2	available	P	100	B&W	Print	Panchromatic cine film.	Russia	135–24
FPP	New Classic EZ400	available	T	400	B&W	Print	Panchromatic black and white negative film, cassette packaged in kraft paper containers.	?	135–36
FPP	X2	available	T	200	B&W	Print	Eastman Double-X Negative Film 5222 / 7222 motion picture film. Medium-speed panchromatic negative film.	USA	135-24
FPP	Svema FN64	available	P	64	B&W	Print	Panchromatic black and white negative film with spectral sensitivity that extends into near infrared (up to 750 nm). Same as 'Dracula.'	Ukraine	135-24
FPP	Svema Foto 100	available	P	100	B&W	Print	Panchromatic, fine grain black and white negative film with spectral sensitivity extends into near infrared (up to 750 nm). Same as 'Let It Snow.'	Ukraine	135-24 THE MUMMY 400 BW FILM
FPP	Svema Foto 200	available	P	200	B&W	Print	Panchromatic black and white negative film with spectral sensitivity that extends into near infrared (up to 750 nm).	Ukraine	135-24
FPP	Svema Foto 400	available	P	400	B&W	Print	Panchromatic black and white negative film with increased red sensitivity. The film also offers a good separation of green shades, and has a wide exposure latitude.	Ukraine	135-24
FPP	FPP X-Ray Film	available	P	100-400	B&W	Print	FPP X-Ray Film is medical xray film adapted to standard medium 120 format (with backing paper and proper numbering). The film is orthochromatic and lacks an anti-halation layer, which gives your photos a high diffusion effect and beautiful grain.		120
FPP	THE MUMMY 400	available	T	400	B&W	Print	Panchromatic medium-grain, medium contrast film ideally suited for striking portrait photography as it is for street photography and action shots! Formulated from our FPP Cine16 (400 film).		120, 135, 620, 4x5, 8x10 (25 Sheets) and Double 8 / 16mm (Movie Film)
FPP	Negative X-Ray Film	available	T	5-10	B&W	Print	Whether you're new to 4x5 photography and concerned about cost or an experienced shooter wanting a unique look, the Film Photography Project has you covered with its new, affordable and easy-to-use 4x5 BW Negative Xray Film.		4x5 (25 Sheets)

=== Color negative films ===
Make	Name	Dates	Base	ISO	Process	Type	Details	Origin	Formats
FPP	Low ISO Color	available	?	1.6	C-41	Print	Kodak low-speed duplicating film intended for making digital dupes in motion picture post production. When used in a camera this film will produce a film negative and soft, shifted colors. No rem jet layer. Non standard anti-halation layer.	USA	135–24
FPP	Blue Ultra Color	available	P	3	C-41	Print	Originally intended for making contact prints in motion picture post production. When used in camera this film will produce a film negative and soft, blue/violet colors. Non standard anti-halation layer.	?	135–24
FPP	Basic color film	available	P	100	C-41	Print	Bright vibrant colors.	?	620

=== Color reversal (slide) films ===
Make	Name	Dates	Base	ISO	Process	Type	Details	Origin	Formats
FPP	Retrochrome 400	available	T	400	E-6	Slide	Eastman Ektachrome color positive film made for industrial and governmental applications. Color reversal camera film that is intended for photography under daylight illumination. Expired 2004, but considered to still achieve ISO. DX coded.	USA	135–36

== Film Washi ==
Factory in Saint-Nazaire, France. Launched in 2013, producing a handcrafted B&W film, handcoated on traditional Washi paper. Also converting other B&W films industrially coated in larger factories and originally made for technical, motion pictures, industrial or aerial applications for creative purposes.

=== Black and white films ===
Make	Name	Dates	Base	ISO	Process	Type	Details	Origin	Formats
Film Washi	'E'	2024-	P	3	B&W	Print	PCB board industrial film with low grain and high contrasts and no sensitivity to green color.	France	120, 4x5"
Film Washi	'F'	2018-	P	100	B&W	Print	Orthochromatic X-ray film used for mass lung disease diagnose with no anti-halation layer and high diffusion effect.	France	135
Film Washi	'I'	available	P	80	B&W	Print	Industrial X-ray film used for non-destructive tests. Coated on both sides of polyester base, no anti-halation layer.	France	120
Film Washi	'K'	2024-	P	100	B&W	Print	Expired Kodak Plus-X film stock for aerial photography .	France	120, 4x5", 5x7"
Film Washi	'P'	Special order	P	100	B&W	Print	Panchromatic film on polyester base, no anti-halation layer.	France	135, 120, Sheet film
Film Washi	'V'	2017-2025	SP	100	B&W	Print	Panchromatic film hand coated on Japanese Gampi paper with high transparency, soft texture and wide latitude exposure. 135 limited to 16 exp. Discontinued due to Gampi paper shortages.	France	135, 120
Film Washi	'W'	available	SP	25	B&W	Print	Orthochromatic film hand coated in France on Japanese Kozo paper with a fibre effect. 135 limited to 16 exp.	France	135, 120, Sheet film
Film Washi	'Y'	available	SP	100	B&W	Print	Described as 'W 2.0' Orthochromatic film hand coated in France on Japanese Kozo paper with a fibre effect.	France	120
Film Washi	'Z'	available	P	400	B&W	Print	Near infrared super-panchromatic aerial photography film to 750 nm.	France	135

=== Color negative films ===
Make	Name	Dates	Base	ISO	Process	Type	Details	Origin	Formats
Film Washi	'X'	available	P	100	C-41	Print	Re-spooled aerial color negative film, Kodak Aerocolor IV.	USA	135

== Flic Film ==
Located in Alberta, Canada, Flic Film packages 35mm cinema film from Eastman Kodak and FilmoTec into cassettes for stills photography and also produces its own house brand photo chemicals. The film is rolled by machine directly from 1000 foot reels and finished with a machine cut leader.

=== Black and white films ===
Make	Name	Dates	Base	ISO	Process	Type	Details	Origin	Formats
Flic film	'Wolfen 100'	2022-	T	100	B&W	Print	Wolfen UN 54. General-use panchromatic black-and-white negative film.	Germany/ Canada	135-36 & 100 ft.
Flic film	XX-250	2022-	T	250	B&W	Print	Kodak Eastman Double-X. High-speed, general-use panchromatic black-and-white negative film. Nominal sensitivity of 250 in daylight conditions and 200 under tungsten lighting.	USA/ Canada	135–36
Flic film	Flic UltraPan 100	2024-	T/P	100	B&W	Print	Fomapan 100 'Classic'.	Czech Rep./Canada	135-36, 120, 100 ft.
Flic film	Flic UltraPan 200	2024-	T/P	200	B&W	Print	Fomapan 200 'Creative'.	Czech Rep./Canada	135-36, 120, 100 ft.
Flic film	Flic UltraPan 400	2024-	T/P	400	B&W	Print	Fomapan 400 'Action'.	Czech Rep./Canada	135-36, 120

=== Color negative films ===
Make	Name	Dates	Base	ISO	Process	Type	Details	Origin	Formats
Flic film	Cine color 50D	2022-	T	50	ECN-2	Print	Daylight balanced color negative cinema film, Kodak Vision3 5203.	USA/Canada	135-36
Flic film	Cine color 250D	2022-	T	250	ECN-2	Print	Daylight balanced color negative cinema film, Kodak Vision3 5207.	USA/Canada	135-36
Flic film	Cine color 200T	2022-	T	200	ECN-2	Print	Tungsten balanced color negative cinema film, Kodak Vision3 5213.	USA/Canada	135-36
Flic film	Cine color 500T	2022-	T	500	ECN-2	Print	Tungsten balanced color negative cinema film, Kodak Vision3 5219.	USA/Canada	135-36
Flic film	Elektra 100	2023-	P	100	C-41	Print	Re-spooled aerial color negative film, Kodak Aerocolor IV. Available starting 2023.	USA/Canada	135-36
Flic film	Aurora 400	2025-	?	400	C-41	Print	Daylight balanced film, commonly considered to be re-spooled Kodak Ultramax.		
Flic film	Aurora 800	2024-2026	?	800	C-41	Print	Daylight balanced color negative film, available starting 2024. Discontinued in early 2026 due to unknown reasons.	USA/Canada	135-36

=== Color reversal (slide ) films ===
Make	Name	Dates	Base	ISO	Process	Type	Details	Origin	Formats
Flic film	Chrome	2024-	T	100	E-6	Slide	Daylight balanced color transparency film, Kodak Ektachrome E100D.	USA/Canada	135-36

== Foma ==
Foma Bohemia spol. s r.o., established in 1921 with factory located in Hradec Králové, Czech Republic, remains one of the last traditional producers of black and white photographic materials including films, papers and chemistry. Films branded as Arista EDU also come from this manufacturer.

=== Black and white films ===
Make	Name	Dates	Base	ISO	Process	Type	Details	Origin	Formats
Foma	Fomapan 100 Classic	1991-	T/P	100	B&W	Print	Traditional general purpose panchromatic fine grain film. 135 (T base), 120 and Sheet film (P base).	Czech Rep.	135-24/36, 17m, 30.5m, 50m, 120, Sheet film
Foma	Fomapan 200 Creative	1996-	T/P	200	B&W	Print	Modern general purpose panchromatic film using both cubic grains and tabular 'T' grains. The emulsion was revised in 2015. Formats: 135 (T base), 120 and Sheet film (P base).	Czech Rep.	135-24/36, 17m, 30.5m, 50m, 120, Sheet film
Foma	Fomapan 400 Action	1994-	T/P	400	B&W	Print	Traditional general purpose panchromatic film. 135 (T base), 120 and Sheet film (P base).	Czech Rep.	135-24/36, 17m, 30.5m, 50m, 120, Sheet film
Foma	Retropan 320 Soft	2015-2021	T/P	320	B&W	Print	Retro 1950s style traditional panchromatic film characterised by a wide range of half tones and 'soft' images. 135 (T base), 120 and Sheet film (P base). 120 format from 2018. 135 format was discontinued in 2019.	Czech Rep.	135–36, 120, Sheet film
Foma	Foma Ortho 400	2023-	T/P	400	B&W	Print	Orthochromatic B&W film.	Czech Rep.	135-36, 120, Sheet film

=== Black and white reversal (slide) films ===
Make	Name	Dates	Base	ISO	Process	Type	Details	Origin	Formats
Foma	Fomapan R 100	1998-	P	100	B&W	Slide	B&W reversal film, intended for B&W motion picture movie making (Cine film) and also converted for still camera use. Processing available through DR5 (USA) or Photo Studio 13 (DE) or using Foma Direct Reversal Kit.	Czech Rep.	135–36, 30.5m

== Fujifilm ==
Fujifilm is a Japanese manufacturer of photographic films, chemistry, papers and cameras established in 1934. Although now a diversified company it is one of only two remaining major manufacturers (with Kodak) of color film. The film range currently comprises: Consumer films; Fujicolor/ Fujicolor Superia and Professional films; Neopan, Velvia and Provia. Fujicolor Pro professional color negative films were discontinued in 2021. Instax is a range of instant films and cameras launched in 1998 which now outsell the traditional products. In 2021 Fujifilm began sourcing some of its color negative film production from Eastman Kodak under 'Fujifilm' branding and in 2024 production partner Yes!Star opened a new conversion and packaging facility for this film in China. Fujifilm distribution depends on worldwide region with Japan specific products sometimes available as Parallel imports.

=== Black and white films ===
Make	Name	Dates	Base	ISO	Process	Type	Details	Origin	Formats
Fujifilm	Neopan 100 Acros II	11.2019-	T	100	B&W	Print	Reformulation of Acros 100 which was discontinued in 2018. A fine-grain ortho-panchromatic 'T' grain film noted for its low rate of reciprocity failure. Film manufacture by Fujifilm, Ashigara, Japan with 120 format conversion and packaging by Harman Technology, UK.	Japan /UK	135–36, 120

=== Color negative films ===
Make	Name	Dates	Base	ISO	Process	Type	Details	Origin	Formats
Consumer films - Japan (Parallel import in other markets)
Fujifilm	Fujicolor 100	available	T	100	C-41	Print	General purpose color film with natural skin tones updated 2011 with super fine grain technology and sold in retail single roll packs and bulk 100 roll plain packs for the business market (Often split by retailers to sell as a budget film). Japan market product. Discontinued SKU; 3 roll packs 03/2020; 24 exp rolls 1/2022.	Japan	135–36
Fujifilm	Fujicolor Superia Premium 400	2009-	T	400	C-41	Print	Variant of Superia 400 X-tra film with improved exposure latitude and optimised for reproduction of Japanese skin tones. Japan/Asia market product. (code CH24). Discontinued SKU; 3 roll packs in 3/2020. 27 exp rolls in 3/2022.	Japan	135–36
Consumer films - Worldwide excluding Japan
Fujifilm	200	2021-	T	200	C-41	Print	General purpose color film replacing C200 in North America in 2021 and Europe in 2022, without FujiColor branding and 'C' prefix. (Code CA24). Later identified as re-branded Kodak Gold 200.	USA or Japan	135–36
Consumer films - Worldwide
Fujifilm	400	2023-	T	400	C-41	Print	'All conditions' consumer color film replacing Fujicolor Superia 400 X-Tra in North America market in Spring 2023. Manufacture by Eastman Kodak. Single rolls and 3-packs.	USA	135–36

=== Color reversal (slide) films ===
Make	Name	Dates	Base	ISO	Process	Type	Details	Origin	Formats
Fujifilm	Fujichrome Velvia 50	2007-	T/P	50	E-6	Slide	Professional-quality, saturated vivid natural colors for nature/landscape photography (RVP 50). Replacement for the original Velvia 50, which was discontinued owing to availability issues with original chemistry. 135 & 120 (T base), sheet film 4x5", 5x7", 8x10" (P base). Discontinued SKU; Sheet films, Europe/USA in 2012, 5x7" in 2013 Japan, 220 in 2015 All sheet films discontinued in Japan 10/2021.	Japan	135–36, 120
Fujifilm	Fujichrome Velvia 100	2005- (To 2021 US)	T/P	100	E-6	Slide	Professional-quality, saturated vivid natural colors for nature, landscape and travel photography. (RVP 100) 135 & 120 (T base), sheet film 4x5", 5x7", 8x10" (P base). Discontinued; 5x7" (2013), 220 (2015), 8x10" (Europe/USA). In 2021 All formats were discontinued in the US due to the presence of minuscule quantities of a chemical banned by the EPA.	Japan	135–36, 120, 4x5" (8x10" JP only) Not US
Fujifilm	Fujichrome Provia 100F	1999-	T/P	100	E-6	Slide	Professional-quality, fine grain general purpose color slide film with natural colors (RDP III). 135 & 120 (T base), sheet film 4x5", 8x10" (P base). Discontinued; 5x7" (2013), 220 (2015).	Japan	135–36, 120, 4x5", 8x10"

=== Instant films ===
These are marketed by format, rather than emulsion.

Make	Name	Dates	Base	ISO	Process	Type	Details	Origin	Formats
Fujifilm	Instax mini	1998-	N/A	800	Instant	Print	General purpose, credit card-sized, instant film available in color (daylight balanced) or black and white, with various frame styles. Print: 54 mm × 86 mm, image size, 46 mm × 62 mm.	Japan	46 mm × 62 mm
Fujifilm	Instax wide	1999-	N/A	800	Instant	Print	General purpose, landscape format, daylight balanced instant color film. Print: 108 mm × 86 mm, image size 99 mm × 62 mm.	Japan	99 mm × 62 mm
Fujifilm	Instax Square	2017-	N/A	800	Instant	Print	General purpose, Square-format, daylight balanced instant color film. Print: 72 mm × 85.6 mm, image size 62 mm × 62 mm.	Japan	62 mm × 62 mm

== Harman ==
See Ilford for company details.

=== Color negative films ===
Make	Name	Dates	Base	ISO	Process	Type	Details	Origin	Formats
Harman	Phoenix 200	2023-2026	T	200	C-41	Print	An experimental color negative film with strong contrast and no anti-halation layer. In 2026 replaced by Phoenix 125.	UK	135–36, 120
Harman	Phoenix II 200	2025-	T	200	C-41	Print	A revised version of phoenix color negative film with improved contrast.	UK	135–36, 120
Harman	RED 125	2025-	T	125	C-41	Print	Redscale film, a reverse rolled version of Phoenix 200. 120 film was added in June 2025.	UK	135–36, 120
Harman	Switch Azure 125	2026-	T	125	C-41	Print	Creative film with switched color couplers similar to Lomo Turquoise.	UK	135-36, 120
Harman	Phoenix 125	2026-	T	125	C-41	Print	Re-released original Phoenix emulsion with exposure rating of 125.	UK	135-36, 120

== Holga ==
The Holga is a low cost plastic medium format 120 film camera, made in Hong Kong, known for its low-fidelity aesthetic. A Holga branded B&W film stock is produced by FOMA.

Make	Name	Dates	Base	ISO	Process	Type	Details	Origin	Formats
Holga	400	2010 on	T/P	400	B&W	Print	Traditional general purpose panchromatic film. 135 in non DX cartridges. Rebranded Fomapan 400.	Czech Rep.	135, 120

== Ilford ==
Harman Technology trading as Ilford Photo is a UK manufacturer of photographic materials based in Mobberley, Cheshire known worldwide for its Ilford branded black and white films, papers and chemicals. The company also produces films under its Kentmere and Harman brands, with a color negative film added in 2023. Harman Technology undertakes contract coating of B&W films and/or conversion/packaging of films for other brands. Ilford films are also produced in a wider range of sheet and bulk roll film sizes including Ultra Large Format arranged through an annual group buying scheme.

(Note: the Ilford brand is shared with Ilford Imaging Europe who also own the Ilfocolor tradermark but other than a common heritage, there is no connection between the two companies).

=== Black and white films ===
Make	Name	Dates	Base	ISO	Process	Type	Details	Origin	Formats
Ilford	PAN 100	available	T	100	B&W	Print	General purpose budget panchromatic film for selected markets (parallel import back into UK)	UK	135–36, 30.5m
Ilford	PAN 400	available	T	400	B&W	Print	General purpose budget panchromatic film for selected markets (parallel import back into UK)	UK	135–36, 30.5m
Ilford	PANF Plus	1992-	T	50	B&W	Print	Very fine grain panchromatic film for portraiture, architecture, still life. Poor image latency so needs to be developed promptly.	UK	135–36, 30.5m, 120
Ilford	FP4 Plus	1990-	T	125	B&W	Print	Fine grain, general purpose panchromatic film with a wide exposure latitude. Originally launched as Ilford Fine grain Panchromatic emulsion in 1935.	UK	135-24/36, 17/30.5m, 120, Sheet film
Ilford	HP5 Plus	1989-	T	400	B&W	Print	Medium contrast, general purpose panchromatic film with a wide exposure latitude. A film tracing its heritage back to the Ilford HyPer sensitive emulsion in 1931. Well suited to photojournalism. Available as a single use camera.	UK	135-24/36, 17/30.5m, 120, Sheet film, SUC-27
Ilford	DELTA 100	1992-	T	100	B&W	Print	Very fine grain modern panchromatic professional film using core-shell crystal technology, Ilford's response to Kodak T-MAX.	UK	135-24/36, 30.5m, 120, Sheet film
Ilford	DELTA 400	2001- (rev)	T	400	B&W	Print	Fine grain modern panchromatic professional film using core-shell crystal technology, first released 1990, Ilford's response to Kodak T-MAX.	UK	135-24/36, 30.5m, 120
Ilford	DELTA 3200	1998-	T	1000	B&W	Print	Modern panchromatic professional film using core-shell crystal technology for fast action and low light photography. An ISO 1000 film suitable for push processing to an EI of 3200 or higher.	UK	135–36, 120
Ilford	ORTHO Plus	available/ *11/2019-	T/P	80D 40T	B&W	Print	Very fine grain Orthochromatic film for continuous tone copy work, B&W duplicating, alternative processes, creative portraiture and architectural photography. The blue and green sensitivity enables the film to be handled in red safelight and processing by inspection. *The addition of 135 and 120 formats was announced in October 2019, on sale from November 2019.	UK	135–36, 120, Sheet film
Ilford	SFX 200	Re-intro 2007	T	200	B&W	Print	Super-panchromatic film with extended red sensitivity up to about 750 nm. To achieve moderate IR effects requires a very deep red filter (Heliopan 715, Hoya R72 or the Ilford SFX filter) or deep red filter otherwise it will give similar results to HP5 upon which it is based.	UK	135–36, 120
Ilford	XP2 Super	available	T	400	C-41	Print	(Chromogenic Dye) C-41 process B&W film. Replaced XP2 Plus, Ilford decided not to call it XP3. Available as a single use camera.	UK	135-24/36, 30.5m, 120, SUC-27

== Ilford Imaging (Europe) ==
Ilford Imaging Europe GmbH and based in Germany, was created following the bankruptcy of Ilford Imaging Switzerland in 2014 and its plant at Marly, Friborg built for Cibachrome/Ilfochrome production, later inkjet paper. The Ilford Imaging and Ilford trademarks was acquired by a joint venture of Australian firm CR Kennedy & Company Pty Ltd and the Japan-based Chugai Photo Chemical Company. The Galerie range of inkjet papers was relaunched in August 2014. The company holds the rights to the Ilford trademark for photographic applications but otherwise has no connection to Ilford Photo.

=== Color negative films ===
Make	Name	Dates	Base	ISO	Process	Type	Details	Origin	Formats
Ilford	Ilfocolor 400 Vintage tone	2023-	T	400	C-41	Print	General purpose color film with 1990s 'retro' tones. Potentially Original Wolfen NC 400. Packaged in China	China	135–24, SUC-27
Ilford	Ilfocolor 400 Plus Vintage tone	2024?-	T	400	C-41	Print	General purpose color film with 1990s 'retro' tones. Potentially Original Wolfen film.	China	135-24/36
Ilford	Ilfocolor 400 Cine tone	2024-	T	400	ECN-2	Print	General purpose color film requiring ECN-2 processing. Rebranded Eastman Kodak Vision3 500T 5219. Packaged in China	China	135–24

=== Color reversal (slide) films ===
Make	Name	Dates	Base	ISO	Process	Type	Details	Origin	Formats
Ilford	Ilfochrome 100	2025?-	T	100	E-6	Slide	General purpose color reversal film for daylight. Rebranded Eastman Kodak Ektachrome E100D 5294.	China	135-24/36

== Japan Camera Hunter ==
Bellamy Hunt is a camera collector and runs the website Japan Camera Hunter. He released his own branded film in 2016, using a B&W traffic surveillance film manufactured by Agfa Gevaert.

Make	Name	Dates	Base	ISO	Process	Type	Details	Origin	Formats
JCH	Streetpan 400	2016-	P	400	B&W	Print	General purpose, Super-panchromatic (up to 750 nm) high speed film	Belgium	135, 120

== Kentmere ==
Kentmere is a brand of classic grain B&W films introduced in 2009 and produced by Harman Technology in Mobberley, Cheshire, UK. Originally designed as a lower priced brand to their Ilford offer to compete in the US market they are now available worldwide. Similar films are also made by Harman Technology for the Agfaphoto, Oriental and Rollei brands. The name is derived from the Kentmere based photographic paper brand acquired by Ilford in 2007 and the films are particularly aimed at the student market and those new to black and white photography, due to their lower cost and 'forgiving' exposure latitude. Film names and packaging were revised in 2018. On 1 December 2022, 120 format film was added to the range. An ISO 200 film was added in May 2025.

Make	Name	Dates	Base	ISO	Process	Type	Details	Origin	Formats
Kentmere	PAN 100	2009-	T	100	B&W	Print	General purpose, panchromatic film with a broad tonal range with ‘medium’ contrast. Finer grain than PAN 400, and a touch more contrast.	UK	135-24/36, 30.5m, 120
Kentmere	PAN 200	2025-	T	200	B&W	Print	General purpose, panchromatic film formulated for enhanced contrast.	UK	135-24/36, 30.5m, 120
Kentmere	PAN 400	2009-	T	400	B&W	Print	General purpose, panchromatic film with excellent ‘push’ characteristics. More noticeable grain than PAN 100, touch less contrast and better latitude for pushing.	UK	135-24/36, 30.5m, 120

== Kodak ==
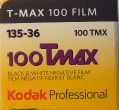
Kodak T-MAX 100

Kodak is a USA manufacturer of photographic films established in 1888 and one of only two major manufacturers (with Fujifilm) still producing color film. Kodak films for still cameras are manufactured by Eastman Kodak in Rochester, New York, USA but following its Chapter 11 bankruptcy in 2012, distribution and marketing was controlled by Kodak Alaris, a UK based company, acquired in 2024 by Los Angeles-based private equity firm Kingswood capital management In September 2025 Eastman Kodak was once again able to distribute films under its own branding, initially in US and Canada, but expanding to Europe in 2026. Kodak Alaris distribution continues in parallel and as they retain key trademarks, Eastman Kodak has revived older brands such as Kodacolor, resulting in some films now being available under two different names.

The film range is divided into Consumer films (Kodacolor, ColorPlus, Gold and Ultramax) and Professional films ( Ektachrome, Portra (Ektacolor Pro), Ektar, Tri-X and T-Max (Ektapan)). A wider range of sheet film sizes for some products are available by a group buying scheme managed for Kodak Alaris by Canham Cameras, USA.

=== Black and white films ===
Make	Name	Dates	Base	ISO	Process	Type	Details	Origin	Formats
Kodak	Tri-X	1940- / 2007-	T/P	320/ 400	B&W	Print	Traditional cubic grain panchromatic film with high contrast and known for its use in photojournalism. Introduced in 1940 as sheet film and in 1954 in other formats (TX), re-engineered in 2007 with a finer grain. A Tri-X single use camera was added in 2021. Sheet film – PET base ISO 320 (TXP). Since January 2026 distributed directly by Eastman Kodak in US and Canada.	USA	135-24/36, 100 ft, 120, 4x5", 5x7", 8x10"
Kodak	T-Max 100 (Ektapan 100)	1986-	T/P	100	B&W	Print	Modern general purpose continuous tone 'T' grain panchromatic film (TMX). Sheet film – PET base. In March 2026 Eastman Kodak began directly distributing the film under the name "Ektapan 100" in US and Canada.	USA	135-24/36, 100 ft, 120, 4x5"
Kodak	T-Max 400 (Ektapan 400)	2008-	T/P	400	B&W	Print	Modern general purpose continuous tone 'T' grain panchromatic film, introduced in 1986 (TMY), revised in 2008 (TMY-2). Sheet Film – PET Base. In March 2026 Eastman Kodak began directly distributing the film under the name "Ektapan 400" in US and Canada.	USA	135-24/36, 100 ft, 120, 4x5"
Kodak	T-Max P3200 (Ektapan P3200)	1988–2012, 2018-	T	800	B&W	Print	High-speed continuous tone 'T' grain panchromatic film (TMZ). Launched in 1998 the film was discontinued in 2012. Re-introduced in March 2018. The “P” means although it is an ISO 800 film it is designed to be push processed to an EI 3200 or higher. In March 2026 Eastman Kodak began directly distributing the film under the name "Ektapan P3200" in US and Canada.	USA	135–36

=== Color negative films ===
Make	Name	Dates	Base	ISO	Process	Type	Details	Origin	Formats
Consumer films
Kodak	Kodacolor 100	2025-	P	100	C-41	Print	General purpose color film. Manufactured from an existing film stock and sold directly by Eastman Kodak.	USA	135-36
Kodak	Kodacolor 200	2025-	P	200	C-41	Print	General purpose color film. Manufactured from an existing film stock and sold directly by Eastman Kodak.	USA	135-36
Kodak	ColorPlus 200	1990-	P	200	C-41	Print	General purpose budget color film. Mid 1980s Kodacolor VR 200 re-introduced as a budget offer to Gold 200, (not USA market), no datasheet available. Moved to estar base in 2021.	USA	135-24/36
Kodak	ProImage 100	1997-	P	EI 100*	C-41	Print	Budget 'Professional' color film with neutral skin tones for portraits, weddings and social events, more saturated colors than Portra. *An EI100 film (ISO ca. 160) originally made for selected markets with hot climates (Latin America & SE Asia) without needing cold storage. Derived from Gold v6 films and uses a Kodak Gold print profile. In 2018 Kodak added it to official distribution in Europe. Estar base from 2023 and in 2019 to North America.	USA	135–36
Kodak	Gold 200	2007-	P	200	C-41	Print	General purpose consumer color film (GB) with saturated colors, fine grain and high sharpness. Kodacolor Gold films introduced in 1988. Kodak Gold (v6) from 1997, current v7 introduced 2007. Estar base from 2023. 120 format reintroduced in March 2022. Since 2025 sold also directly by Eastman Kodak.	USA	135-24/36, 120
Kodak	UltraMax 400	2007-	P	400	C-41	Print	General purpose 'all conditions' consumer film (GC) with bright vibrant colors and natural skin-tones. Originally Gold 400 (1997 to 2007). Estar base from 2023. Since 2025 sold also directly by Eastman Kodak.	USA	135-24/36
Kodak	UltraMax 800	2007-	T	800	C-41	Print	General purpose high speed consumer film (GT) with bright vibrant colors and natural skin-tones. Since 2008 only sold in Kodak single use cameras	USA	SUC-27/39
Professional films
Kodak	Ektar 100	2008-	T/P	100	C-41	Print	Professional fine grain film with ultra-vivid colors for nature, travel & fashion photography. Sheet film – PET base. Since January 2026 also sold directly by Eastman Kodak.	USA	135–36, 120, 4x5", 8x10"
Kodak	Portra 160 (Ektacolor Pro 160)	2011-	T/P	160	C-41	Print	Professional, very fine grain film with natural colors and low contrast/saturation for portraits, fashion & wedding photography. Vision3 technology. Sheet film – PET base. In March 2026 Eastman Kodak began directly distributing the film under the name "Ektacolor Pro 160" in US and Canada.	USA	135–36, 120, 4x5", 8x10"
Kodak	Portra 400 (Ektacolor Pro 400)	2010-	T/P	400	C-41	Print	Professional, fine grain film with natural colors for portraits, fashion & commercial photography. Slightly higher contrast than Portra 160. Vision3 technology. Sheet film – PET base. In March 2026 Eastman Kodak began directly distributing the film under the name "Ektacolor Pro 400" in US and Canada.	USA	135–36, 120, 4x5", 8x10"
Kodak	Portra 800 (Ektacolor Pro 800)	1998-	P	800	C-41	Print	Professional, fine grain film with natural colors for low light situations. Estar base from 2021. In March 2026 Eastman Kodak began directly distributing the film under the name "Ektacolor Pro 800" in US and Canada.	USA	135–36, 120

=== Color reversal (slide) films ===
Make	Name	Dates	Base	ISO	Process	Type	Details	Origin	Formats
Kodak	Ektachrome E100	2018-	T	100	E-6	Slide	Professional very fine grain film with moderate saturation and neutral tones. Based on a reformulation of Ektachrome E100G (last available in 2012). Launched at Photokina September 2018 in 135 format. 120 and sheet film formats went on sale in December 2019. Since February 2026 also distributed directly by Eastman Kodak in 135 and 120 formats.	USA	135–36, 120, 4x5", 8x10"

== Kono! ==
Launched in 2014, Kono! is a small European analogue photographic company based in Austria that produces a range of 'creative' 35mm format films. Most Kono! films are based on stock originally intended for shooting motion pictures, scientific purposes or other places photosensitive emulsions were used. All films are hand rolled onto recycled 135 film cassettes. Kono! also produced creative films for the 'dubblefilm' brand until early 2019.

=== Black and white films ===
Make	Name	Dates	Base	ISO	Process	Type	Details	Origin	Formats
Kono!	Monolit 64	2018-	T	64	B&W	Print	Medium contrast black & white film. Produced with assistance from Astrum. Potentially Svema FN 64.	Austria/ Ukraine	135–36
Kono!	Rekorder 100-200	2018-	T	100-200	B&W	Print	'Creative' B&W film featuring pre-exposed numbers and letters.	Austria	135–24

=== Color negative films ===
Make	Name	Dates	Base	ISO	Process	Type	Details	Origin	Formats
KONO!	Donau 6	available	T	6	C-41	Print	Creative color film with strong blues and ultra slow speed suitable for long exposure photography in the daytime, extremely long exposures in the evening or at night.	Austria	135–24
Kono!	Kolorit 125 Tungsten	available	T	125	C-41	Print	Tungsten balanced color film, motion picture film stock suitable for C-41 process.	Austria	135–24
Kono!	Kolorit 400 Tungsten	available	T	400	C-41	Print	Tungsten balanced color film, motion picture film stock suitable for C-41 process.	Austria	135–24
Kono!	Rotwild 400	available	T	400	C-41	Print	Creative color film with intense tints, ranging from yellow to deep red with re-animated motion picture film stock suitable for C-41 process. Probably a redscale film.	Austria	135–24
Kono!	Alien 200	available	T	200	C-41	Print	Creative color film pre-exposed with green aliens.	Austria	135–24
Kono!	UFO 200	available	T	200	C-41	Print	Creative color film pre-exposed with UFOs.	Austria	135–24
Kono!	Katz 200	available	T	200	C-41	Print	Creative color film pre-exposed with cats paw prints.	Austria	135–24
Kono!	Luft 200	available	T	200	C-41	Print	Creative color film pre-exposed with light blue hearts.	Austria	135–24
Kono!	Liebe 200	available	T	200	C-41	Print	Creative color film pre-exposed with red hearts.	Austria	135–24
Kono!	Wintermärchen 200	available	T	200	C-41	Print	Creative color film 'Winter fairytale' pre-exposed with festive images.	Austria	135–24

== Kosmo Foto ==
Stephen Dowling runs the website Kosmo Foto (Previously Zorki Photo, renamed because the name Zorki was still being used in Russia). He released his own branded B&W film in 2017, supplied by Foma Bohemia, the packaging of which is noted for its bold Soviet-era inspired artwork, with a second film added in 2021.

Make	Name	Dates	Base	ISO	Process	Type	Details	Origin	Formats
Kosmo Foto	Mono	2017-	T	100	B&W	Print	Traditional general purpose panchromatic fine grain film. Re-branded Fomapan 100 120 format was added in May 2019.	Czech Rep.	135–36, 120
Kosmo Foto	Agent Shadow	2021-	T	400	B&W	Print	Traditional general purpose panchromatic ISO 400 fine grain film. Rebranded Kentmere 400 Launched in 2021 following a successful Kickstarter campaign. Packaging features film noir inspired artwork.	TBC	135–36

== Lomography ==
Headquarters in Vienna, Austria. Lomography is a globally-active organization dedicated to analogue, experimental and creative photography. Lomography procures films from film manufacturers to sell under the Lomography brand. They also provide film in 110 format.

=== Black and white negative films ===
Make	Name	Dates	Base	ISO	Process	Type	Details	Origin	Formats
Lomography	Orca	2012-	T	100	B&W	Print	General purpose panchromatic film in 110 format. Probably Wolfen UN 54.	Germany	110–24
Lomography	Earl Grey	2017-	T/P	100	B&W	Print	General purpose panchromatic film. Currently Fomapan 100	Czech Rep.	135–36, 120
Lomography	Lady Grey	2017-	T/P	400	B&W	Print	General purpose, panchromatic film. Kodak T-MAX 400 to mid 2017, currently Fomapan 400.	Czech Rep.	135–36, 120
Lomography	Berlin 400	2018-	T	400	B&W	Print	Cinematic (Kino) panchromatic film with wide exposure latitude (EI to 3200) and suitable for reversal processing 'from a German company changing the face of cinema since the 1900s' Probably Wolfen N 74 or N 74 Plus (before 2019) and N 75 ('2019 formula').	Germany	135–36, 120
Lomography	Potsdam 100	2019-	T	100	B&W	Print	Cinematic (Kino) panchromatic film with fine grain 'from a German company changing the face of cinema since the 1900s' Probably Wolfen UN 54. Available in May 2019.	Germany	135–36, 120
Lomography	Fantome Kino	2020-	T	8	B&W	Print	Slow speed panchromatic film with high contrast. The edge markings show an Wolfen DP 31 duplicating positive film.	Germany	135–36
Lomography	Babylon Kino	2020-	P	13	B&W	Print	Slow-speed panchromatic film with soft contrast, sharp detail, low grain and subtle gradient transitions based on a 'German cinema film'. Characteristics suggest an Wolfen DN 21 duplicating negative technical emulsion.	Germany	135–36

=== Color negative films ===
Make	Name	Dates	Base	ISO	Process	Type	Details	Origin	Formats
Lomography	Color Negative 100	available	T	100	C-41	Print	General purpose color film for sunny conditions.	USA	135–36, 120
Lomography	Color Negative 400	available	T	400	C-41	Print	General purpose color film.	USA	135–36, 120
Lomography	Color Negative 800	available	T	800	C-41	Print	General purpose color film.	USA	135–36, 120
Lomography	LomoChrome Turquoise XR	2015-	T	100-400	C-41	Print	Creative color negative film with orange to turquoise hues, initial limited edition, followed by 2nd batch with finer grain. 2021 formula.	tbc	110-24, 135–36, 120
Lomography	LomoChrome Purple XR	2017-	T	100-400	C-41	Print	Creative color negative film with purple hues, initial limited edition, followed by 2nd batch with finer grain. Further limited batch in both formats in 2019.	Germany	110–24, 135–36, 120
Lomography	Redscale XR	2018-	T	50-200	C-41	Print	Creative redscale film with an extended exposure range.	tbc	135–36, 120
Lomography	LomoChrome Metropolis XR	2019-	T	100-400	C-41	Print	Creative color negative film featuring a desaturated look with washed out colors. Funding was launched via a kickstarter campaign in 2019 which met its funding target in 72 hours. First deliveries to funders and retailers December 2019.	Germany	110–24, 135–36, 120
Lomography	Color Tiger 200	2022-	T	200	C-41	Print	General purpose color film.	USA	110–24
Lomography	Lobster Redscale	2022-	T	200	C-41	Print	Creative redscale film with an extended exposure range.	tbc	110–24
Lomography	LomoChrome Color '92	2023-	T	400	C-41	Print	Retro general purpose color film. The grain and the hues are reminiscent of consumer film available in the 1990s. As a LomoChrome, it is a limited edition film.	Germany	110–24, 135–36, 120
Lomography	LomoChrome Color '92 Sun-kissed	2024-	T	400	C-41	Print	Similar properties to LomoChrome Color '92, but with orange and yellow hues.	Germany	110-24, 135–36, 120
Lomography	LomoChrome Classicolor 200	2025-	T	200	C-41	Print	General purpose color negative film with stronger red tones.	tbc	135-36

== Luckyfilm ==
Lucky Group Corporation in Baoding, Héběi province, China produced a range of color, black and white, and chromogenic black and white consumer films. color film was produced initially in conjunction with Kodak after signing a 20-year partnership which Kodak ended in 2007 after four years. However, after a long pause in 2024 Luckyfilm re-released their SHD 100 and SHD 400 black and white films. Luckyfilm also plans, if the demand is there, to re-release color film stock as well.

=== Black and white negative films ===
Make	Name	Dates	Base	ISO	Process	Type	Details	Origin	Formats
Lucky	SHD 100	2024-	T	100	B&W	Print	General purpose panchromatic film.	China	135–36, 120
Lucky	SHD 400	2024-	?	400	B&W	Print	General purpose panchromatic film.	China	135-36, 120

=== Color negative films ===
Make	Name	Dates	Base	ISO	Process	Type	Details	Origin	Formats
Lucky	C200	2025-	?	200	C-41	Print	General purpose color negative film.	China	135–36, 120
Lucky	C400	2026-	?	400	C-41	Print	General purpose color negative film.	China	135–36

== Optik Oldschool ==
Based in Düsseldorf, Germany, film lab Optik Oldschool sponsored the production of an improved version of the upcoming Original Wolfen NC 200 color film incorporating a conventional orange mask for easier lab scanning and improved color rendition. Initial production will be on a thicker 135μm triacetate base followed by a production version on thinner polyester. In 2025 Optik Oldschool acquired the SantaColor brand and released new film.

=== Black and white negative films ===
Make	Name	Dates	Base	ISO	Process	Type	Details	Origin	Formats
Optik Oldschool	Motion DBL-X	available	T	250	B&W	Print	Black and white panchromatic film. Respooled Kodak Double-X 5222.	USA	135–36
Optik Oldschool	OptiMono 100	2026-	T	100	B&W	Print	Black and white panchromatic film based on Wolfen UN 54 and NP 100.	Germany	135–36

=== Color negative films ===
Make	Name	Dates	Base	ISO	Process	Type	Details	Origin	Formats
Optik Oldschool	Motion 200T	available	T	200	ECN-2 / C-41	Print	Color negative film for artificial light. Respooled Kodak Vision3 200T 5213.	USA	135–36
Optik Oldschool	Motion 250D	available	T	250	ECN-2 / C-41	Print	Color negative film for daylight. Respooled Kodak Vision3 250D 5207.	USA	135–36
Optik Oldschool	Motion 500T	available	T	500	ECN-2 / C-41	Print	Color negative film for artificial light. Respooled Kodak Vision3 500T 5219.	USA	135–36
Optik Oldschool	OptiColour 200	2025-	T	200	C-41	Print	Improved version of Original Wolfen NC 200 color negative film with orange mask and improved color rendition.	Germany	135–36, 120, 4x5", 5x7", 8x10"
Optik Oldschool	SantaColor 800	2025-	T	800	C-41	Print	High speed color negative film made in USA.	USA	135–36
Optik Oldschool	SantaColor 100	2026-	T	100	C-41	Print	Color negative aerial surveillance film without orange mask. Respooled Kodak Aerocolor IV.	USA	135–36

== Oriental ==
Oriental is a Japanese brand of photographic films and papers owned by Cyber Graphics Co, Tokyo. The photographic films are produced by Harman Technology, UK and are similar to the Kentmere films. They were developed as a budget B&W film for the Japanese market.

Make	Name	Dates	Base	ISO	Process	Type	Details	Origin	Formats
Oriental	Seagull 100	2016-	T	100	B&W	Print	General purpose, panchromatic film, similar to Kentmere 100.	UK	135–36
Oriental	Seagull 400	2016-	T	400	B&W	Print	General purpose, panchromatic film, similar to Kentmere 400.	UK	135–36

== Original Wolfen ==
Original Wolfen is a brand of black and white film products, made in Germany. Once part of Agfa, the partition of Germany saw the company divided, the East German company becoming VEB Film- und Chemiefaserwerk Agfa Wolfen, which later adopted the brand ORWO in 1964. The company was privatised in 1990 as ORWO AG, but film production ceased in 1994 following the liquidation of the company. One of the successor companies, ORWO FilmoTec GmbH was founded in 1998 to produce high quality black and white cinema and technical films, based in Wolfen including the Camera films UN 54 and N 75 (List of motion picture film stocks) which are widely re-packaged for still film use. In 2020 FilmoTec was brought under common ownership with part of film manufacturer InovisCoat GmbH, also based in Germany to offer products for the film industry under the traditional brand “ORWO”. A trademark dispute resulted in use of Original Wolfen branding instead. In 2022 they announced the introduction of a 'still' camera black and white film and a new colour film. In July 2026, Chris Vandebroek, co-founder of lab and film brand Optik Oldschool based in Düsseldorf, acquired Filomotec GmbH and InovisCoat GmbH.

=== Black and white negative films ===
Make	Name	Dates	Base	ISO	Process	Type	Details	Origin	Formats
Original Wolfen	UN 54	2022-	T	100	B&W	Print	Panchromatic medium speed black-and-white negative cine camera film for both outdoor and indoor usage.	Germany	135–36
Original Wolfen	NP 100	2022-	T	100	B&W	Print	Fine grained still film. UN 54 with an added dyed anti-haltion layer. Since 2026 available in 120 format.	Germany	135–36, 120
Original Wolfen	P 400	2022-	T	250	B&W	Print	Panchromatic film originally developed for bank surveillance, ISO 250/25°.	Germany	135–36

=== Color negative films ===
Make	Name	Dates	Base	ISO	Process	Type	Details	Origin	Formats
Original Wolfen	NC 500	2022-	T	400	C-41	Print	Color negative film based on the Agfa XT320 cinefilm stock emulsion without remjet for still photography. Low colour saturation/de-saturated shadows with emphasis to green and enhanced grain. EI ca. 250-320.	Germany	135-36
Original Wolfen	NC 400	2023-	T	400	C-41	Print	Color negative film, similar to NC 500 with slightly less grain and cooler tones	Germany	135-36

== Polaroid ==
Polaroid B.V. is a Dutch photography company that was founded in 2008 as the 'Impossible Project' to re-introduce instant film for Polaroid cameras. Impossible bought the production machinery from Polaroid for $3.1 million and leased a building, called Building Noord, which was formerly part of the Polaroid plant in Enschede, Netherlands but had to re-invent the emulsions and processes, resulting in a reduction in number of shots per pack of film, from 10 to 8. Polaroid Corporation's brand and intellectual property were acquired by Impossible Project's largest shareholder in 2017 and the company was later renamed 'Polaroid Originals' before becoming 'Polaroid' in 2020. Based in Enschede, Polaroid manufactures film for its own and selected original Polaroid instant cameras. Instant films are marketed by format rather than emulsion.

Make	Name	Dates	Base	ISO	Process	Type	Details	Origin	Formats
Polaroid	i-Type film	available	N/A	640	Instant	Print	General purpose instant color or black and white film. As with Fujifilm's Instax film, various frame styles are available.	Netherlands	107x 88mm
Polaroid	600 film	2015-	N/A	640	Instant	Print	General purpose instant color or black and white film. Various frame styles.	Netherlands	107x 88mm
Polaroid	SX-70 film	2013-	N/A	160	Instant	Print	General purpose instant color or black and white (ISO 160) film. Various frame styles	Netherlands	107x 88mm
Polaroid	8x10 film	available	N/A	640	Instant	Print	General purpose instant color or black and white film.	Netherlands	325x 215mm (8x10")

== Rera ==
Rera is a brand of photographic film for 127 (4x4) format roll film cameras assembled in Japan by Kawauso-Shoten. Film is converted for 127 format and sold through main retailers.

=== Black and White films ===
Make	Name	Dates	Base	ISO	Process	Type	Details	Origin	Formats
Rera	Pan 100S	2019-	P	100	B&W	Print	General purpose super panchromatic medium speed black and white film with extended red sensitivity to 750 nm on a polyester base. High contrast but high resolution and fine grain. Different film to the original Pan 100 discontinued in 2018. Recommendation to process as per Silberra Pan 100.	Japan	127
Rera	Pan 400	2018-	T	400	B&W	Print	General purpose panchromatic traditional high-speed black and white film. Recommendation to process as per Rollei RPX 400.	Japan	127

=== Color negative films ===
Make	Name	Dates	Base	ISO	Process	Type	Details	Origin	Formats
Rera	Cool 100	2018-	P	100	C-41	Print	Limited edition color negative film only available direct from supplier.	Japan	127

=== Color reversal (slide) films ===
Make	Name	Dates	Base	ISO	Process	Type	Details	Origin	Formats
Rera	Chrome 100	2018-	P	100	E-6	Slide	General purpose color slide film last available in 2017. Yellow cast means reduced suitability for flowers and landscapes.	Japan	127

== Revolog ==
Revolog is a small company based in Vienna, Austria which re-manufactures and sells a range of creative 'special effects' still camera films. Revolog take standard ISO 200 color film in 135 format and pre-expose the rolls with a special effect. In 2019 they also re-manufacture creative films for dubblefilm.

=== Black and white films ===
Make	Name	Dates	Base	ISO	Process	Type	Details	Origin	Formats
Revolog	Snovlox	2019-	T	200	B&W	Print	Snow effect, similar to Volvox film, based on Kodak T-MAX 100 emulsion.	Austria	135–36

=== Color negative films ===
Make	Name	Dates	Base	ISO	Process	Type	Details	Origin	Formats
Revolog	Echo	available	T	200	C-41	Print	Color shifts with prismatic textures.	Austria	135–36
Revolog	Kolor	available	T	200	C-41	Print	Adds a rainbow of colors - including red, blue, orange, green, pink, turquoise to images.	Austria	135–36
Revolog	Kosmos	available	T	200	C-41	Print	Blue stardust will make little galaxies appear on your images.	Austria	135–36
Revolog	Laser	available	T	200	C-41	Print	Thick green and blue lines effect.	Austria	135–36
Revolog	Nebula	2020-	T	200	C-41	Print	Blue and green stardust effect. Also limited availability in ISO 400.	Austria	135–36
Revolog	Plexus	available	T	200	C-41	Print	Organic looking, bluish structure effect to that of a neural net or underwater reflections.	Austria	135–36
Revolog	Rasp	available	T	200	C-41	Print	colored scratches/narrow lines effect running through images.	Austria	135–36
Revolog	Streak	available	T	200	C-41	Print	Cintage effect, which will look as if they were taken through a scratched window or lens.	Austria	135–36
Revolog	Tesla I	available	T	200	C-41	Print	Unexpected bluish-white lightning bolts effect.	Austria	135–36
Revolog	Tesla II	available	T	200	C-41	Print	Unexpected red lightning bolts effect.	Austria	135–36
Revelog	Texture	available	T	200	C-41	Print	Bubble-like structure effect.	Austria	135–36
Revolog	Volvox	available	T	200	C-41	Print	Bright green dot effect in different shapes and sizes.	Austria	135–36
Revolog	460 nm	available	T	200	C-41	Print	Depending on exposure/scanner settings pictures will either appear blue/violet or yellow/green.	Austria	135–36, 120
Revolog	600 nm	available	T	200	C-41	Print	Depending on exposure/scanner settings pictures will have a reddish or a bluish–green tint.	Austria	135–36, 120

== Rollei ==
The Rollei brand for photographic film is licensed to Maco (Hans O. Mahn GmbH & Co. KG, Maco Photo Products) a German-based supplier of photographic films. Headquarters in Stapelfeld, Germany. They offer a range of polyester* base black and white and color films originally for aerial photography produced by Agfa-Gevaert and converted by Maco for still camera use and general purpose triacetate base RPX 100/400 black and white films from Harman Technology / Ilford Photo. (Note: Polyester base films must be loaded in subdued light to avoid light piping effect).

=== Black and white films ===
Make	Name	Dates	Base	ISO	Process	Type	Details	Origin	Formats
Rollei	RPX 25	2014-	P	25	B&W	Print	General purpose low speed Panchromatic film E.I. 12–50. Considered to be Agfa-Gevaert Aviphot 80 PE1 film (same as 80S) converted and packaged by Harman Technology.	Belgium/ UK	135–36, 120, 4x5"
Rollei	RPX 100	2014-	T	100	B&W	Print	General purpose, medium speed Panchromatic film. Similar to Kentmere 100.	UK	135–36, 120
Rollei	RPX 400	2014-	T/P	400	B&W	Print	General purpose, high speed Panchromatic film. Similar to Kentmere 400, 135 & 120 triacetate base. Discontinued; ca. 2020 4x5" (Polyester base).	UK	135–36, 120
Rollei	Ortho 25 Plus	2017-	P	25	B&W	Print	Orthochromatic film. Replaced Rollei Ortho in 2017.	Germany	135–36, 120, sheet film
Rollei	Retro 80S	2009-	P	80	B&W	Print	Super-panchromatic film (extended red to 750 nm). (Agfa-Gevaert Aviphot Pan 80). Converted & packaged by Harman Technology (135) or Foma (120).	Belgium/ Czech Rep/ UK	135–36, 120
Rollei	SuperPan 200	2007-	P	200	B&W	Print	Super-panchromatic film (extended red sensitivity) (Agfa-Gevaert Aviphot Pan 200).	Belgium	135–36, 120
Rollei	Retro 400S	available	P	400	B&W	Print	Super-panchromatic film (extended red sensitivity). (Agfa-Gevaert Aviphot Pan 400). Polyester base.	Belgium	135–36, 120
Rollei	Infrared 400	available	P	400	B&W	Print	Super-panchromatic film (extended red sensitivity). (Agfa-Gevaert Aviphot Pan 400).	Belgium	135–36, 120, 4x5"
Rollei	Blackbird	2019-	P	25-100	B&W	Print	'Creative' orthpanchromatic B&W film giving high contrast sharp images with results dependent on ISO/development process. Re-introduced in August 2019.	Belgium	135–36
Rollei	Paul & Reinhold	2020 -	P	640	B&W	Print	Fine grain & natural contrasts Exposure latitude from ISO 320/26° to ISO 1600–33°. Limited Edition to celebrate Rollei brands 100 Year anniversary since founding in 1920 by Paul Franke and Reinhold Heidecke.	?	135-36 2 pack

=== Color negative films ===
Make	Name	Dates	Base	ISO	Process	Type	Details	Origin	Formats
Rollei	Redbird	2018-	P	400	C-41	Print	A reverse-rolled 'creative' color negative film. The redscale effect is achieved by exposing through the base of the film which gives extremely warm red, yellow and orange tones. Re-introduced in 2018.	Belgium	135–36

=== Color reversal (slide) films ===
Make	Name	Dates	Base	ISO	Process	Type	Details	Origin	Formats
Rollei	CrossBird	2018-	P	200	E-6 (C-41)	Slide (Print)	Normal results in E-6 reversal process specially designed 'creative' effects film for cross-processing in C-41. 135 format to be introduced later in 2018. Edge markings reported to be same as the discontinued Rollei CR 200.	Belgium	135–36, 127, 120

== SFL ==
Sreda film lab is based in Moscow, Russia. These films are repackaged from bulk rolls into 35mm cassettes or 120 rolls by Sreda for still camera use. Film is packaged with distinctive original artwork. 120 films are wrapped in silver foil.

=== Black and white films ===
Make	Name	Dates	Base	ISO	Process	Type	Details	Origin	Formats
SFL	T-25	available	P	125	B&W	Print	Panchromatic film.	Russia	135–36
SFL	T-42	available	P	125	B&W	Print	Panchromatic film.	Russia	135–36
SFL	UN54	available	T	100	B&W	Print	Wolfen UN 54 panchromatic cinefilm for still use.	Germany	135–36
SFL	UN75	available	T	320	B&W	Print	Wolfen N 75 panchromatic cinefilm for still use.	Germany	135–36
SFL	Double-X 5222	available	?	250	B&W	Print	Kodak Double-X 5222	USA	135–36
SFL	Double-X Aerographic 400	available	?	400	B&W	Print	Kodak Double-X Aerographic 2405. Panchromatic film 2012 exp.	USA	120

=== Color negative films ===
Make	Name	Dates	Base	ISO	Process	Type	Details	Origin	Formats
SFL	A-Color 125	available	P	125	C-41	Print	Kodak Aerocolor IV	USA	135-12/24, 120
SFL	50D	available	T	50	ECN-2	Print	Kodak Vision3 50D (5203)	USA	135–36
SFL	250D	available	T	250	ECN-2	Print	Kodak Vision3 250D (5207)	USA	135-24/36, 120
SFL	200T	available	T	200	ECN-2	Print	Kodak Vision3 200T (5213)	USA	135–36, 120
SFL	500T	available	T	500	ECN-2	Print	Kodak Vision3 500T (5219)	USA	135-24/36, 120

== Shanghai ==
The Shanggong Shanghai Photosensitive material factory (formerly Shanghai ShenBei photosensitive material factory), was established in 1958 in Shanghai, China producing a black and white film primarily for domestic production as well as X-ray materials. Production was interrupted in 2015–6 due to new factory construction. It is part of the Shanggong group conglomerate. In 2019, 135 film was announced under the Shanghai name by a new company and photographic wholesaler Shanghai Jiancheng Technology Ltd that has acquired the rights to the name and companies assets, but initially appears to be re-packaged FilmoTec product. Formats includes 220 and 620 medium format film.

=== Black and white films ===
Make	Name	Dates	Base	ISO	Process	Type	Details	Origin	Formats
Shanghai	GP3 100 PAN	1958-	P	100	B&W	Print	Traditional black and white panchromatic film with a thin anti-halation layer giving a retro look.	China	3.25x 4.25", 4x5", 8x10"
Shanghai	GP3 100 PAN	2019-	P	100	B&W	Print	General purpose panchromatic film. In 2019 a 135 format was announced coated in Europe and packaged in plastic cassettes in China. Considered to be Wolfen UN 54 cinefilm based on edge rebate markings. Further formats added in 2021.	Germany/ China	135, 120, 127, 220, 620
Shanghai	GP3 400 PAN	2019-	P	400	B&W	Print	General purpose panchromatic film coated in Europe and packaged in plastic cassettes in China. Considered to be Wolfen N 74 cine film based on edge rebate markings.	Germany/ China	135, 120

=== Color negative films ===
Make	Name	Dates	Base	ISO	Process	Type	Details	Origin	Formats
Shanghai	Shenguang 400	2024-	P	400	C-41	Print	General purpose colour negative, considered to be Original Wolfen NC 400 packaged in China.	Germany/ China	135–36

== Silberra ==
The company based in Saint Petersburg, Russia was founded in 2009 producing analog film products. It adopted the Silberra name in 2017 to introduce a range of Black & white films. Funding was sought through an indiegogo crowdfunding campaign to launch six new films. Three panchromatic films are available from launch based on Agfa-Gevaert Aviphot products. Two orthochromatic films were added in 2018. Silberra also offer cinema film from FilmoTec and Kodak in 135 cassettes for still use Фотопленки

=== Black and white films ===
Make	Name	Dates	Base	ISO	Process	Type	Details	Origin	Formats
Silberra	S25	2020-	P	25	B&W	Print	Limited edition extra fine grain, moderate contrast and high resolution with extended red sensivity - Can be used as an IR film with suitable filter. Limited to 800 rolls.	Russia	135–36
Silberra	Orta 50	2018-	P	50	B&W	Print	Orthochromatic film (insensitive to red light) high resolution and high contrast.	Russia	135–36
Silberra	Pan 50 /Ultima 50	2017-	P	50	B&W	Print	General purpose panchromatic film with extended red sensitivity. Ultima - 80 μm thick base, Pan 100 μm thick base. Agfa-Gevaert Aviphot film.	Russia/ Belgium	135–36
Silberra	Ultima 100	2017-	P	100	B&W	Print	General purpose panchromatic film with extended red sensitivity. 100 μm thick base. Agfa-Gevaert Aviphot film.	Russia/ Belgium	135–36
Silberra	Pan 160 /Ultima 160	2017-	P	160	B&W	Print	General purpose panchromatic film with extended red sensitivity. Ultima - 80 μm thick base, Pan 100 μm thick base. Agfa-Gevaert Aviphot film.	Russia/ Belgium	135–36, 120
Silberra	Pan 200 /Ultima 200	2017-	P	200	B&W	Print	General purpose panchromatic film with extended red sensitivity. Pan & Ultima, same emulsion different polyester base thickness (PAN 100 μm vs Ultima 80 μm). Agfa-Gevaert Aviphot film.	Russia/ Belgium	135–36
Silberra	U200	2018-	P	200	B&W	Print	General purpose panchromatic film. High contrast mixed T/classic grain emulsion on a thin 80 μm polyester base.	Russia	135–36
Silberra	U400	2018-	P	400	B&W	Print	General purpose panchromatic film. igh contrast mixed T/classic grain emulsion on a thin 80 μm polyester base.	Russia	135–36
Silberra	Cinema UN54	2018-	T	100	B&W	Print	Converted from Wolfen UN 54 cinema film.	Russia/ Germany	135–36
Silberra	Cinema 75N+	2019-	T	400	B&W	Print	Converted from Wolfen N 75 Plus cinema film.	Russia/ Germany	135–36
Silberra	Cinema 52XX	2018-	P	200	B&W	Print	Converted from Eastman Kodak 5222 Double-X cinema film. Silberra rate it at 200 rather than native 250 ISO.	Russia/ USA	135–36

=== Color negative films ===
Make	Name	Dates	Base	ISO	Process	Type	Details	Origin	Formats
Silberra	Color 50	2020-	T/P	50	C-41	Print	Push +2, pull -1		135–36, 120
Silberra	Color 100	2020-	T/P	100	C-41	Print	Push +1, pull -2		135-24/36, 120
Silberra	Color 160	2020-	T/P	160	C-41	Print	Push +1, pull -1		135-24/36, 120

== SPUR ==
SPUR (Speed Photography & Ultra high Resolution) is a supplier of own brand specialist photochemistry and films based in Langerwehe, Germany. Two black & white films produced by Agfa-Gevaert are sold under their own brand.

Make	Name	Dates	Base	ISO	Process	Type	Details	Origin	Formats
SPUR	DSX	Available	P	32-64	B&W	Print	High resolution black and white Panchromatic document film. Resolution of up to 600 LP/mm. Rebranded Agfa-Gevaert Copex Rapid A.H.U.	Belgium	135, 120
SPUR	Ultra R 800	2019-	P	6	B&W	Print	Orthopanchromatic document film with resolution of up to 800 LP/mm replacing SPUR UR.	?	135

== Svema (Astrum) ==
Founded in Soviet times in 1931, the Svema film factory and chemical plant in Shostka, Ukraine was once the second largest film producer in Europe. Final coating of X-ray films occurred in 2003 and the plant closed completely in 2005. After attempts by the state to sell the business, bankruptcy processes were completed in 2015. The coating machinery was sold for scrap and the main buildings were demolished ca. 2018. However, a decade prior to closure, a small group of Svema employees had founded Astrum holdings in a rented building on the site in 1995, buying bulk film from various sources which they converted and packaged, for retail sale. Originally sold under the Astrum name (film expiring up to 2019), they later acquired rights to the Svema trademark and now apply the name to a range of films for nostalgic value. (Tasma for NK-2). The current range comprises polyester (thin) base films of the kind used for aerial/surveillance photography. Potential suppliers include Agfa-Gevaert and Tasma.

=== Black and white films ===
Make	Name	Dates	Base	ISO	Process	Type	Details	Origin	Formats
Svema	МЗ-3 (MZ-3)	available	P	3	B&W	Print	Very slow blue sensitive B&W film	Ukraine	135
Svema	ФН 64 (FN 64)	available	P	64	B&W	Print	General purpose panchromatic film.	Ukraine	135, 120, Sheet film
Svema	Фoto 100 (Foto 100)	available	P	100	B&W	Print	General purpose panchromatic film.	Ukraine	135, 120, Sheet film
Svema	Фoto 200 (Foto 200)	available	P	200	B&W	Print	General purpose panchromatic film.	Ukraine	135
Svema	Фoto 400 (Foto 400)	available	P	400	B&W	Print	General purpose panchromatic film.	Ukraine	135
Svema	А-2Ш (A-2SH)	available	P	400	B&W	Print	General purpose panchromatic film.	Ukraine	135
Tasma	НК-2Ш (NK-2SH)	available	P	100	B&W	Print	General purpose panchromatic film.	Ukraine	135

Svema Микрофиш МА-10 4,8 ISO

=== Color negative films ===
Make	Name	Dates	Base	ISO	Process	Type	Details	Origin	Formats
Svema	Color	available	P	125	C-41	Print	Bold fine grain film with an unusual color palette. Possibly a Kodak aero film	Ukraine	135

== UltraFine ==
UltraFine is the house trade brand of photo retailer Photo Warehouse of California, USA who has been producing own brand products since 1979. Photo Warehouse has historically offered three major Black and White Photo Films, Ultrafine Black and White Films 1979 to 2012, Ultrafine Plus Films 2002 to 2011, and Ultrafine Xtreme Films from 2008 to the present day. The current Xtreme films are manufactured by Harman Technology based on packaging and codes. The 135 films are still offered in 12 exp cassettes.

Make	Name	Dates	Base	ISO	Process	Type	Details	Origin	Formats
Ultrafine	Ortho Litho Film	Available	T	10	B&W	Print	Orthochromatic Film originally designed primarily for making line and halftone negatives for photomechanical reproduction and can be utilized as a continuous tone film.	US	135–20, 100 ft, Sheet
Ultrafine	Finesse 100	Available	T	100	B&W	Print	All purpose, panchromatic film for bulk loading.	US	135–100 ft
Ultrafine	Finesse 400	Available	T	400	B&W	Print	All purpose, panchromatic film for bulk loading.	US	135–100 ft
Ultrafine	Xtreme 100	Available	T	100	B&W	Print	General purpose, panchromatic film.	US /UK	135-12/24/36, 100 ft, 120
Ultrafine	Xtreme 400	Available	T	400	B&W	Print	General purpose, panchromatic film.	US /UK	135-12/24/36, 100 ft, 120

== Vibe ==
Film brand mainly sold in Asia, but can also be found on sale in Europe.

=== Black and white films ===
Make	Name	Dates	Base	ISO	Process	Type	Details	Origin	Formats
Vibe	Photo B&W 100	available	T	100	B&W	Print	Panchromatic film, not DX coded.	EU	135–36
Vibe	Photo B&W 400	available	T	400	B&W	Print	Panchromatic film, not DX coded.	EU	135–36

=== Color negative films ===
Make	Name	Dates	Base	ISO	Process	Type	Details	Origin	Formats
Vibe	Photo 400	available	T	400	C-41	Print	Daylight balanced color negative film.	Japan	135–27
Vibe	Photo 800	available	T	800	C-41	Print	Tungsten balanced color negative film (3200k). For daylight rate at EI 500 with an 85b filter. (Kodak 5219 Vision 3 500T – ISO 500 in native ECN-2 chemistry).	USA	135–27

== Yodica ==
Yodica is a small company established in Milan, Italy in 2018, which produces and sells a range of creative 'special effects' still camera films. Yodica takes ISO 400 color film in 135 format and pre-expose the film with a special effect. Films are not DX coded.

=== Color negative films ===
Make	Name	Dates	Base	ISO	Process	Type	Details	Origin	Formats
Yodica	Antares	2018-	T	400	C-41	Print	Warming tint to the top half of each frame and a cooling tint to the bottom.	Italy	135–36
Yodica	Andromeda	2018-	T	400	C-41	Print	Adds a rose/pink tint - Indoor Only.	Italy	135–36
Yodica	Atlas	2018-	T	400	C-41	Print	Rainbow effect in random patchwork.	Italy	135–36
Yodica	Pegasus	2018-	T	400	C-41	Print	Rainbow-effect which travels horizontally across each frame (landscape orientation).	Italy	135–36
Yodica	Polaris	2018-	T	400	C-41	Print	Adds a cooling blue tint.	Italy	135–36
Yodica	Sirio	2018-	T	400	C-41	Print	Adds blue/green tones.	Italy	135–36
Yodica	Vega	2018-	T	400	C-41	Print	Cooling tint to the top half of each frame and a warming tint to the bottom.	Italy	135–36

== See also ==
- Photographic film
- List of discontinued photographic films
- List of motion picture film stocks
- List of photographic film formats
- Film format
