= Tabular-grain film =

Type of photographic film

Tabular-grain film is a type of photographic film. By contrast with more traditional emulsions, the silver halide crystals in tabular grain films are flatter (i.e. more tabular, hence the name). Tabular grain technology offers improved sensitivity with- in turn- scope for improvements in resolution and granularity.

Tabular grain films first became widely available during the 1980s. Today they include nearly all modern color films, as well as many black and white films such as the T-MAX range from Kodak (including their T-grain emulsion), Delta from Ilford Photo, Agfa's now-discontinued APX series, and Fujifilm Neopan.

== Tabular crystals ==
In panchromatic emulsions, the sensitivity of the silver halide crystal is enhanced by sensitizing dyes that adsorb on the crystal surface. Therefore, sensitivity can be increased by adsorbing more sensitizing dye. This requires increasing the surface area of the crystal, and also improving the dye molecules to form a dense assembly. Tabular grain emulsion solves the first part of this problem.

Tabular crystals tend to lie along the film's surface when coated and dried. This reduces scattering of light and increases resolution.

Tabular crystals usually have two twinned planes parallel to each other. They are formed at the very beginning of the crystallization. The crystal tends to grow at the edges and not on the main planes, forming very thin crystals of very large surface areas. Tabular crystals probably existed from very early days of silver-gelatin photography. However, it took until roughly 1970 for emulsion engineers to be able to make emulsions that consisted mainly of tabular crystals. Moreover, it was not until the 1980s that tabular crystals began to be used in production emulsions.

=== Fixing tabular crystals ===
Tabular crystals grow along the edges and not on the main planes. Similarly, tabular crystals dissolve mainly along the edges and this causes the crystals to be more difficult and slow to fix in the fixing stage. Users of tabular grain films are advised to ensure sufficient fixing time, at least twice the clearing time in rapid fixer.

== Performance improvements ==
Tabular grain technology brought significant improvements to the image quality of the film, particularly in the improvement of resolution and granularity. However, several more key technologies were implemented into tabular grain products. Many of these concurrent improvements were applied to non-tabular grain products to improve image quality. Therefore, when tabular grain technology is described by uninformed writers, its advantage tends to be overemphasized. For example, excellent reciprocity law is not an inherent property of tabular crystals but rather the result of other techniques introduced at about the same time.
