= Reala =

Reala may refer to:

- A protagonist of the 1996 video game Nights into Dreams
- A variant of Fujifilm Superia film
