= Maco (film company) =

German photographic film company

Maco (Hans O. Mahn GmbH & Co. KG, Maco Photo Products) is a Germany-based supplier of photographic films, including former Agfa film types. They also make 127 film.

Most of their films are now sold under the Rollei label, a brand licensed from RCP Technik Verwaltungs GmbH / RCP-Technik GmbH & Co. KG / Rollei GmbH & Co. KG.

== See also ==
- List of photographic films
- List of discontinued photographic films
