= DigitalRev TV =

YouTube information
- Channel: DigitalrevTV
- Years active: 2007-2019
- Genre: Photography
- Subscribers: 1.78 million
- Views: 455 million
- Last updated: 23 Apr 2026
- Website: tv.digitalrev.com

DigitalRev TV is the YouTube channel of DigitalRev Media, a Hong Kong–based photography Retail, social media platform and content producer. The channel was created by DigitalRev CEO and producer Richard Yu and was co-produced and presented by Kai Man Wong. DigitalRev TV routinely published new product reviews, parodies, challenges and how-to guides, and was known for its irreverent style in the vein of Top Gear. It was once the most subscribed to photography channel on YouTube. Changes were made to the presentation staff in late 2016, which have led to intermittent content from the channel and sister channel DigitalRev Plus. The most recent video uploaded to the channel was published on October 18, 2019, and is considered the last video of the channel.

== Background ==
The channel began in 2007 with a format that usually involved a fixed-camera view of a reviewer's hands showing off the details of a particular photography product available at its store. In each video, there was an un-boxing of a product and run down of some of its features.

The format changed with the introduction of lead presenter Kai Man Wong. Location shooting was introduced, along with a shift to actively testing products, making group comparisons, and looking at wider aspects of photography such as techniques, construction projects and camera culture. Richard Yu became the unseen producer who set challenges. In 2015 when Wong moved to the UK, the channel's content was produced by a team in Hong Kong and by Wong in the UK. DRTV worked with Bellamy Hunt on some of their videos, usually featuring camera shops of Japan, and 35mm film cameras.

== Presenters ==
Kai Man Wong was the main presenter of DigitalRev from December 2009, and was joined by camera man and editor Lok Cheung in 2010. In 2011 Alamby Leung, the channel's then project coordinator, began to make appearances in the show. Change came after the departure of Leung in 2013, and the introduction of DigitalRev's Bokeh blog and Bokeh YouTube channel in 2014. From 2015 Kai presented videos from East Anglia in the UK, often with British fashion photographer Paul John Bayfield, while Lok fronted Hong Kong–based episodes with Ian Wong and Warren Ng. Other former contributors have included Garcia, Barry, Asuka, Rita Law and Hannah Scott.

Kai and Lok left DigitalRev in November and December 2016 respectively. Both made an announcement on their personal YouTube channels. Warren Ng and Ian Wong also made announcements shortly after that they have also left DigitalRev TV.

From 2017 onwards, Rebecca Leung, Eugene Chan and Tianran He have taken over hosting on the channel.
