= Bergger =

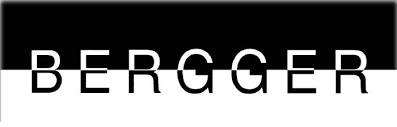
- Company type: Simplified Joint Anonymous Company
- Industry: Photography
- Founded: 1995
- Founder: Guy Géreld and Daniel Boucher
- Headquarters: Vicq-sur-Breuilh
- Website: https://bergger.com

The Bergger company was begun over a century ago by French manufacturer Guilleminot. The company manufactures monochrome photographic film 35mm to 20"x24" as well as photographic paper and chemicals.

As of 2021, Bergger currently offer a single B&W film manufactured on their behalf, Pancro 400 introduced in 2015 replacing BRF400Plus (in 120, 35 mm and sheet formats), and a low sensitivity (ISO 3) print film for darkroom use (in sheet format).

== History ==
Bergger was established in 1995 by Guy Gérald, a chemical engineer and former employee of Guilleminot, and Daniel Boucher, an economics expert. The company specializes in producing black-and-white photosensitive materials in various formats and chemicals for photographic development.

In 2014, Aurélien Le Duc became the majority shareholder and CEO. This led to the modernization of production lines that had remained largely unchanged since the 2000s. In 2015, Bergger introduced Pancro400 film for large format, which gained popularity among enthusiasts of black-and-white analog photography. By 2017, Pancro400 was also made available in 135 and 120 formats for traditional and medium-format cameras.

To further support analog photography, Bergger developed black-and-white film developers such as Berspeed and Superfine and revived traditional formulas like PMK, a pyrogallic acid-based developer dating back to the early days of photography. In 2019, Bergger launched the Bergger PrintFilm, a continuous-tone film on a PET base designed for creating inter-negatives or inter-positives for darkroom printing.

== Products ==
=== Photographic films ===
Initially, Bergger offered three black-and-white films:

- BRF-100: Equivalent to Fortepan 100
- BRF-200: Equivalent to Fortepan 200
- BRF-400: Equivalent to Fortepan 400

These films remained in production until 2007. In 2015, Bergger introduced Pancro 400, a black-and-white film designed to replace BRF400Plus. Initially available in sheet film format, Pancro 400 was expanded to 135 and 120 formats in 2017.

=== Chemicals ===
In addition to films, Bergger produces a range of photographic chemicals:

==== Film Developers: ====
- PMK: A pyrogallic acid-based developer
- Berspeed
- Superfine
- BER49

==== Fixer ====
- BERFIX

==== Paper Developers ====
- Bergger Neutral Print
- Bergger WarmTone Print

== See also ==
- List of photographic films
- List of discontinued photographic films
