= Bellamy Hunt =

- Other names: Japan Camera Hunter
- Occupations: Photographer, blogger, camera dealer
- Known for: Japan Camera Hunter website
- Website: www.Japancamerahunter.com

Bellamy Hunt is a camera collector and runs the website Japan Camera Hunter. Based in Tokyo, Hunt focuses on film cameras. Hunt scours the city's many camera stores looking for collectible cameras- often by request of online customers. Most of the classic cameras Hunt searches for are collectible Leica and Nikon models. From 2011 to 2013 Hunt's business boomed.

Hunt has recently become well known for working with Kai Man Wong and Lok Cheung, the former presenters of DigitalRev TV, producing videos in Hong Kong such as "5 Top Film Cameras for Under $1000", showcasing the renowned camera stores of Hong Kong.
