= Ilford Delta =

Product line of black & white film

Delta 100
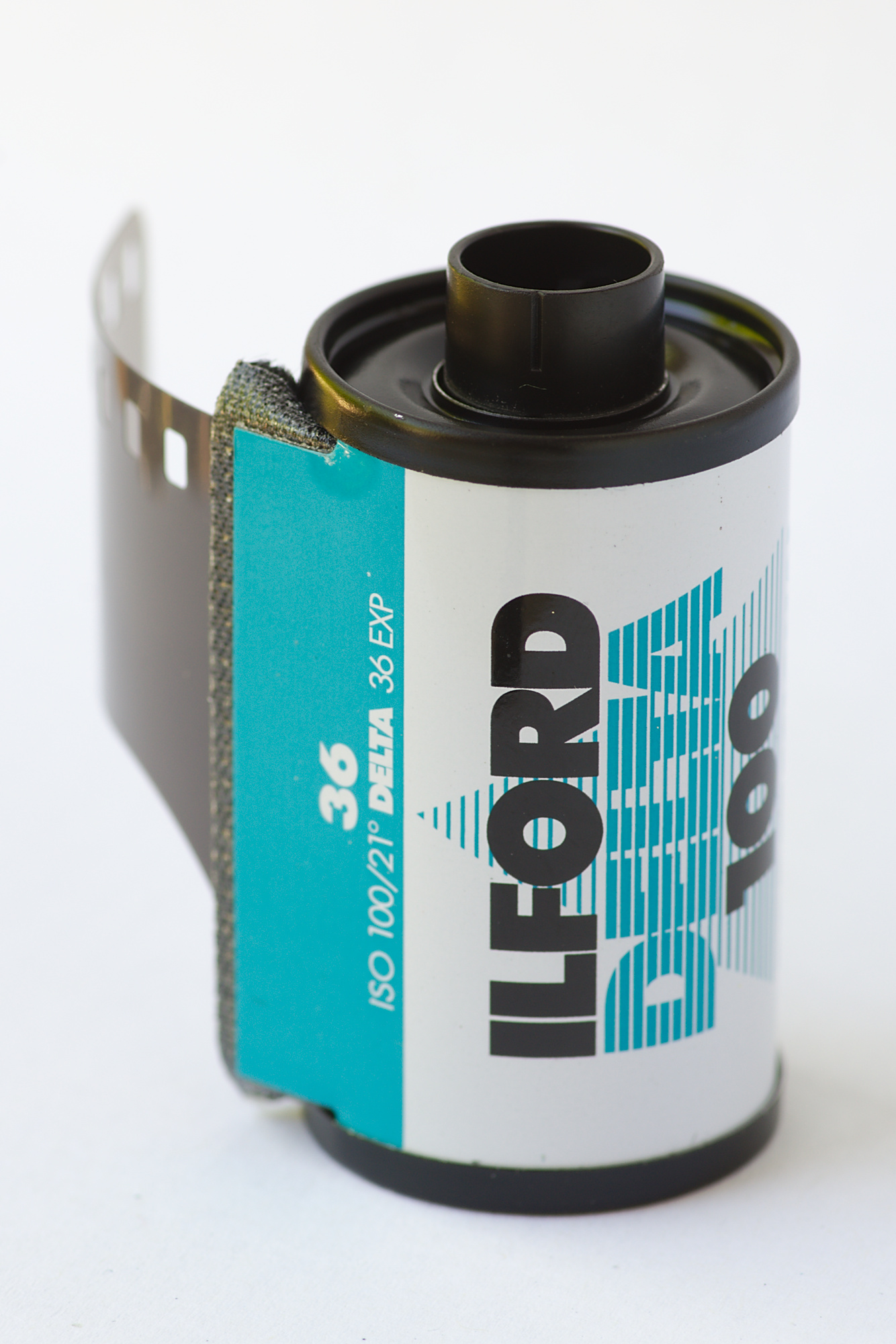
- Maker: Ilford Photo
- Speed: 100/21°
- Type: B&W print
- Process: Gelatin-silver
- Format: 35mm, 120, sheet film
- Application: General, portraits
- Introduced: 1992

Delta 400
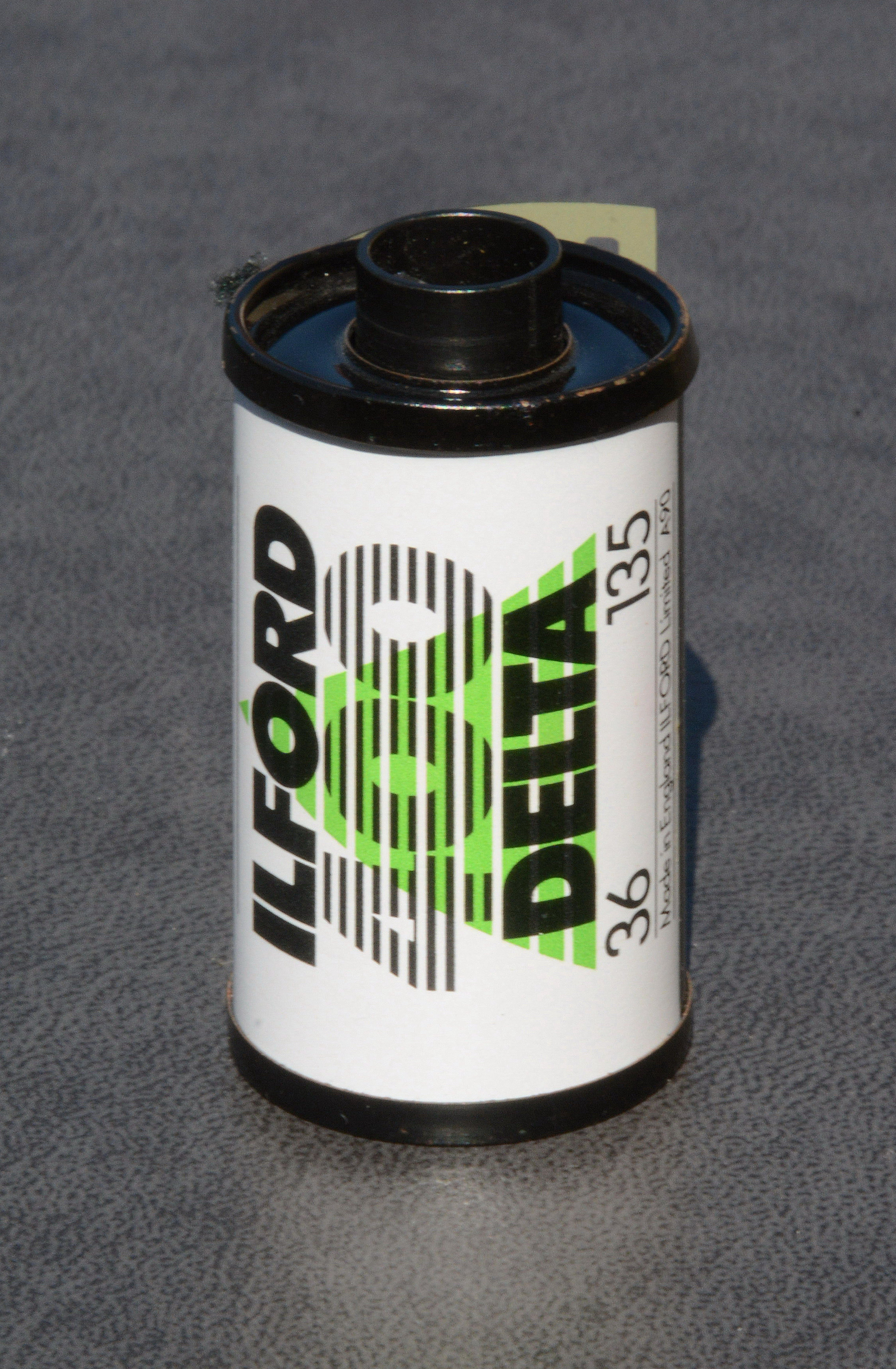
- Speed: 400/27°
- Push: EI 3200/36°
- Type: B&W print
- Format: 35mm, 120
- Application: General, sports
- Introduced: 1992

Delta 3200
- Speed: 1000/31°
- Push: EI 3200/36° or much more
- Type: B&W print
- Format: 35mm, 120
- Application: General, sports, low-light
- Introduced: 1998

Ilford Delta is a series of photographic films manufactured by Harman Technology Limited. Delta films are tabular-grain black-and-white films, and originally released in 400 ISO only to compete with Kodak's T-Max film.

Ilford recommends Delta 100 and 400 as replacements for the discontinued Agfa APX100 and APX400 films, respectively. Delta 100 can be used at ISO speeds of 50 to 200.

== Delta 3200 ==
The 'Delta 3200' product is not actually rated at ISO 3200/36°. Its speed is only 1000/31° following the ISO methods, but it has a very wide exposure latitude. Thus it can be successfully push processed to EI 3200 or 6400, or even 12500. Delta 3200 was introduced in 1998, 10 years after Kodak's similar T-MAX P3200. It replaced Ilford's high speed 'HPS' film.

== Delta 400 ==
Delta 400 can also be pushed to EI 3200.
