= Fujifilm Superia =

Brand of photographic film

Superia
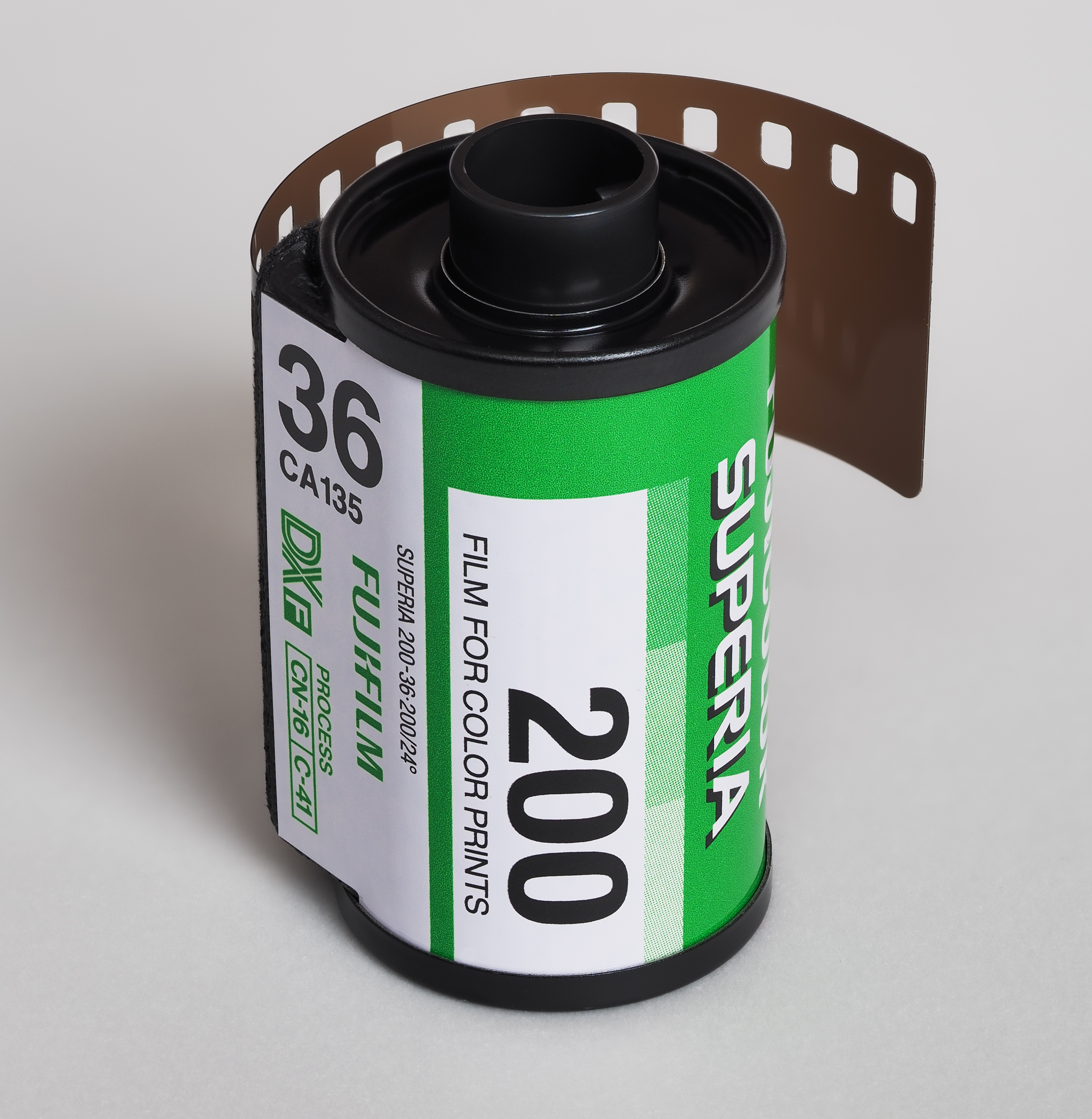
- Maker: Fujifilm
- Speed: 100/21°, 200/24°, 400/27°, 800/30°, 1600/33°
- Type: Color print
- Balance: Daylight
- Process: C-41
- Format: 35mm, 120/220, 110
- Application: General (consumer)

Superia 200
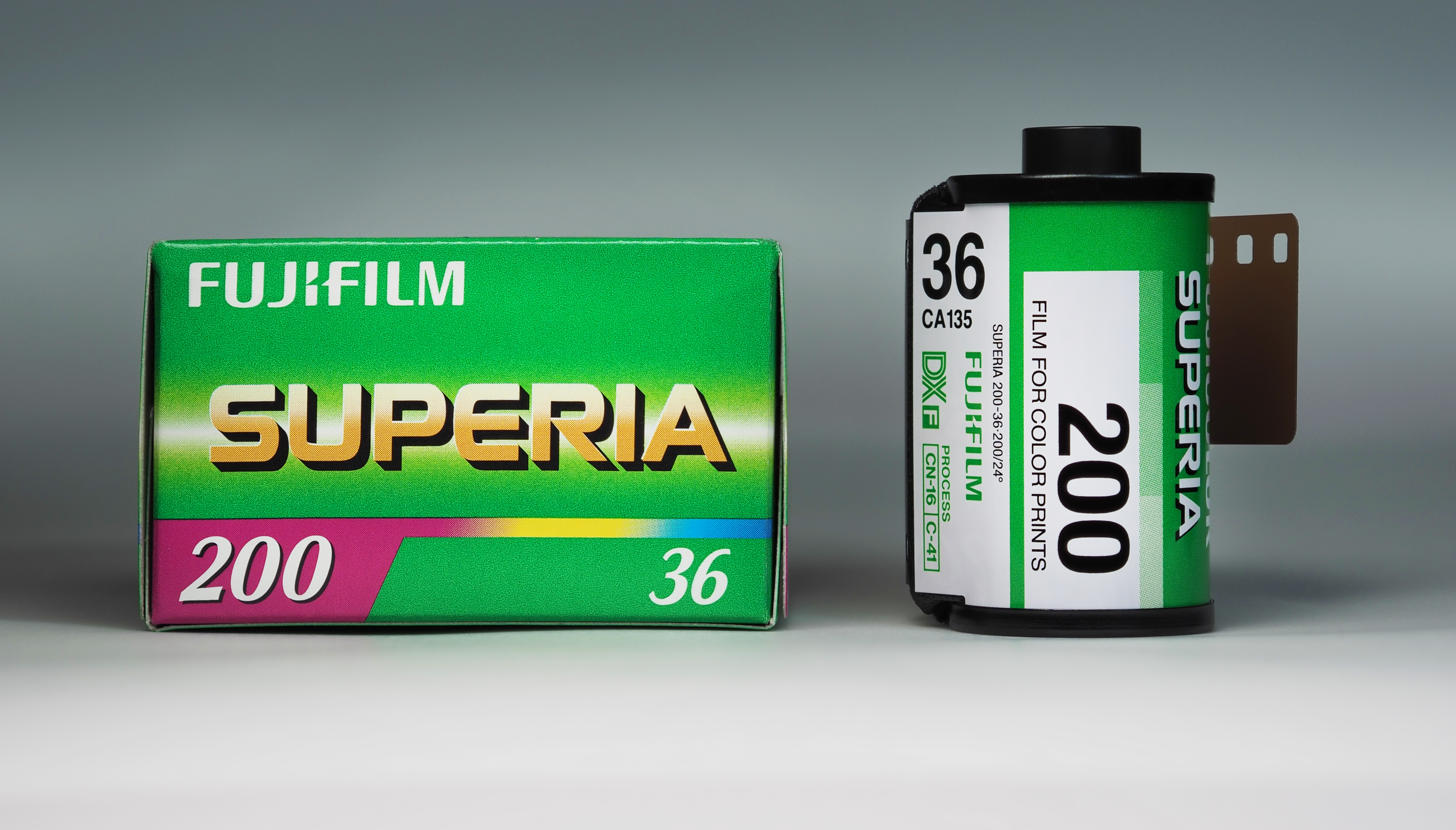
- Speed: 200/24°
- Type: Color print
- Process: C-41
- Format: 35mm
- Application: General (enthusiast)

Superia Reala
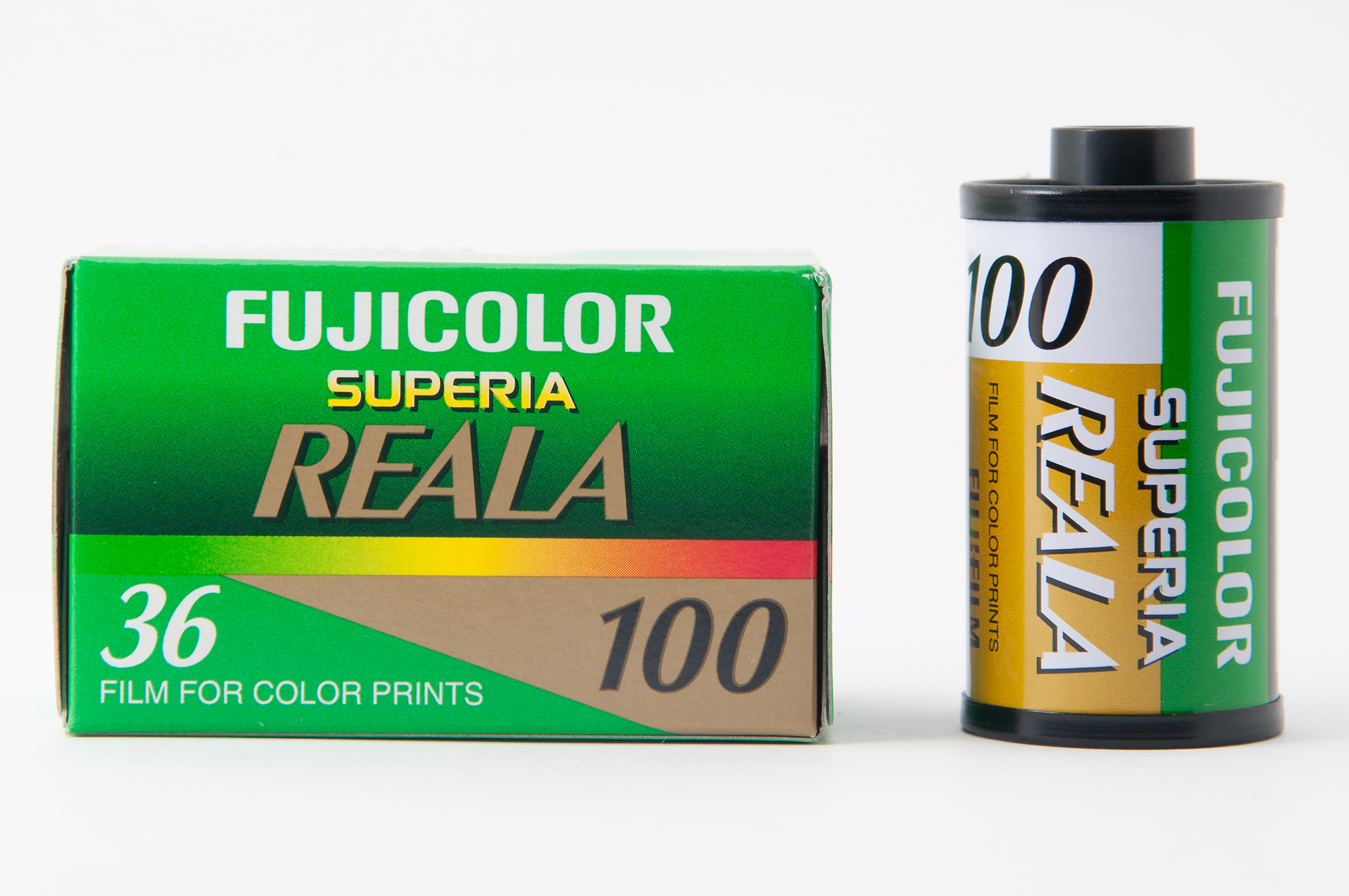
- Speed: 100/21°
- Type: Color print
- Process: C-41
- Format: 35mm, 120/220
- Application: General (enthusiast)

Fujicolor Superia is a Fujifilm brand of daylight balanced colour negative film introduced ca.1998 primarily aimed at the consumer market, but was also sold in a professional 'press' variant. A key feature at launch was the '4th' cyan colour layer designed to provide improved colour reproduction under fluorescent lighting. Its Kodak equivalent is the Kodacolor (later Kodak) Gold/Ultramax line.

By mid 2024, the only film in the product line is Superia Premium 400 (officially distributed in Japan only).

== History ==
Fujicolor Superia is a Fujifilm brand of daylight balanced consumer colour negative film introduced c1998 replacing the previous 'Super G plus' films. This film has been manufactured in 100, 200, 400, 800 and 1600 ISO speeds. Superia Premium 400 a Japanese market variant was added in 2009. The Superia line was primarily aimed at the consumer point and shoot market but is also popular with enthusiasts. All speeds of all films were available in 135 format. Superia 100 and 400, as well as Reala 100 were additionally available in the 120 format. Superia 200 was also made in the 110 format. Despite the launch of Superia, Fujifilm also continued to offer a budget 'fujicolour' negative film in ISO 100 or 200 speeds based on older technology for price sensitive markets.

The end of the first decade of the 2000s saw the heavy decline of the market for consumer colour film with the substitution of compact film cameras with digital cameras (and subsequently camera phones)

Consequently the range has been steadily rationalised with films discontinued; Superia 100 (2009?), Reala 100 (2012), Superia X-tra 800 & Superia 1600 (outside Japan – 2016). Superia 200 (2017) and Natura 1600 (Japan – 2017). Additionally the range of packaging options for the remaining films was reduced. In January 2019 Superia X-tra 400 was removed from sale in the Japan market. In May 2019 Fujifilm announced the discontinuation of Venus 800 in Japan effective December 2019. 3-roll packs of Superia Premium in Japan were withdrawn in March 2020.

By mid 2019 the product line had been consolidated into two ISO 400 'all conditions' films in 135 format only; Superia X-tra 400 (distributed outside Japan) and Superia Premium 400 (officially distributed in Japan). In April 2024, Superia X-tra 400 was also discontinued in all markets.

== Film Layers ==
All current films in the Superia range list the following layer composition in their product information.

Layer Diagram

Press
- Speed: 400/27°, 800/30°
- Type: Color
- Format: 35mm
- Application: General (professional)

The '4th' cyan colour layer was designed to provide improved colour reproduction under fluorescent lighting, although use of filters is still recommended. Later films dropped the 4th layer (see Superia 400 X-tra and Premium 400).

== Current Variants ==
=== Superia Premium 400 ===
Japanese market variant of Superia X-tra 400 consumer film launched in 2009 with improved exposure latitude and optimised for reproduction of Japanese skin tones. No 4th color layer. Sold in single rolls and 3 packs. Not generally available outside of the Japanese Market. In February 2020 it was announced that the 3 roll packs will be discontinued in March 2020. Format 135 (36 & 24 exp).

== Discontinued Variants ==
=== Superia Reala ===
An ISO 100/21° speed portrait film aimed at professionals and enthusiasts, originally known as Fuji Reala (CS). First 4th layer technology film for improved colors (no greenish cast) under fluorescent lighting later extended to fujifilm Superia and Pro color negative films. Formats 135, 120, and 220. 135 format discontinued in 2012 and 120 format in 2013.

=== Superia 100 ===
General purpose ISO 100 daylight colour negative film designed for flexibility and ease of use. Sharp, accurate vibrant colours (Code CN). Formats 135, 120. Discontinued 2009.

=== Superia 200 ===
General purpose ISO 200/24° daylight colour negative film designed for flexibility and ease of use, Superia 200 worked outdoors in daylight or indoors with flash. It offered enhanced color reproduction, sharpness, and smooth, fine grain. (Code CA) in formats 110 and 135. 110 was discontinued first. One of the most widely available consumer films of the early 2000s as the main competitor to the equally ubiquitous Kodak Gold 200, discontinuation of the 135 format was confirmed in May 2017 with stock in some stores lasting to early 2018. Older technology Fujicolor C200 (without 4th color layer) was advised as a replacement.

=== Superia X-tra 400 ===
General purpose daylight type ISO 400 color negative film that incorporated the 4th Color Layer and fine grain (Sigma) technology from Pro line of films and later revisions (2003) incorporated the improved 'Super' Fine-Σ (Sigma) Grain Technology (Code CH). Updated 2006, with improved shelf life and super uniform fine grain technology. Marketed as an 'All conditions' consumer film competing with Kodak Ultramax. The Japanese datasheet revision 8.2007 (code CH-23) indicates that the 4th colour layer was later dropped.

Formats 135, 120. 120 format was discontinued in 2013. 135 format multipacks (except Japan/US) and 24 exp rolls were discontinued in 2017 leaving 135-36 exp single rolls only (plus 3x36 multipacks in Japan/US). In January 2019 the film was removed from sale in Japan and in 2024 discontinued in all markets, replaced by Fujifilm 400, contract manufactured by Kodak.

=== True Definition 400 ===
A USA market variant of Superia X-tra 400 launched 2005 (possibly to compete with Kodaks High Definition 400 film) with similar characteristics to X-tra 400 including sigma fine grain and 4th colour layer but adding newly developed 'Fine Color Film Technology' – a technology which realizes natural and smooth gradation that captures precise detail over a wide exposure range with brilliant color maintained. Natural skin tones, softer graduation including the precise depiction of textures.(code CH-11, contemporary X-tra 400 CH-7). Format 135 (3x24 exp. packs) only. Discontinued.

=== Superia 800/X-tra 800/Venus 800 ===
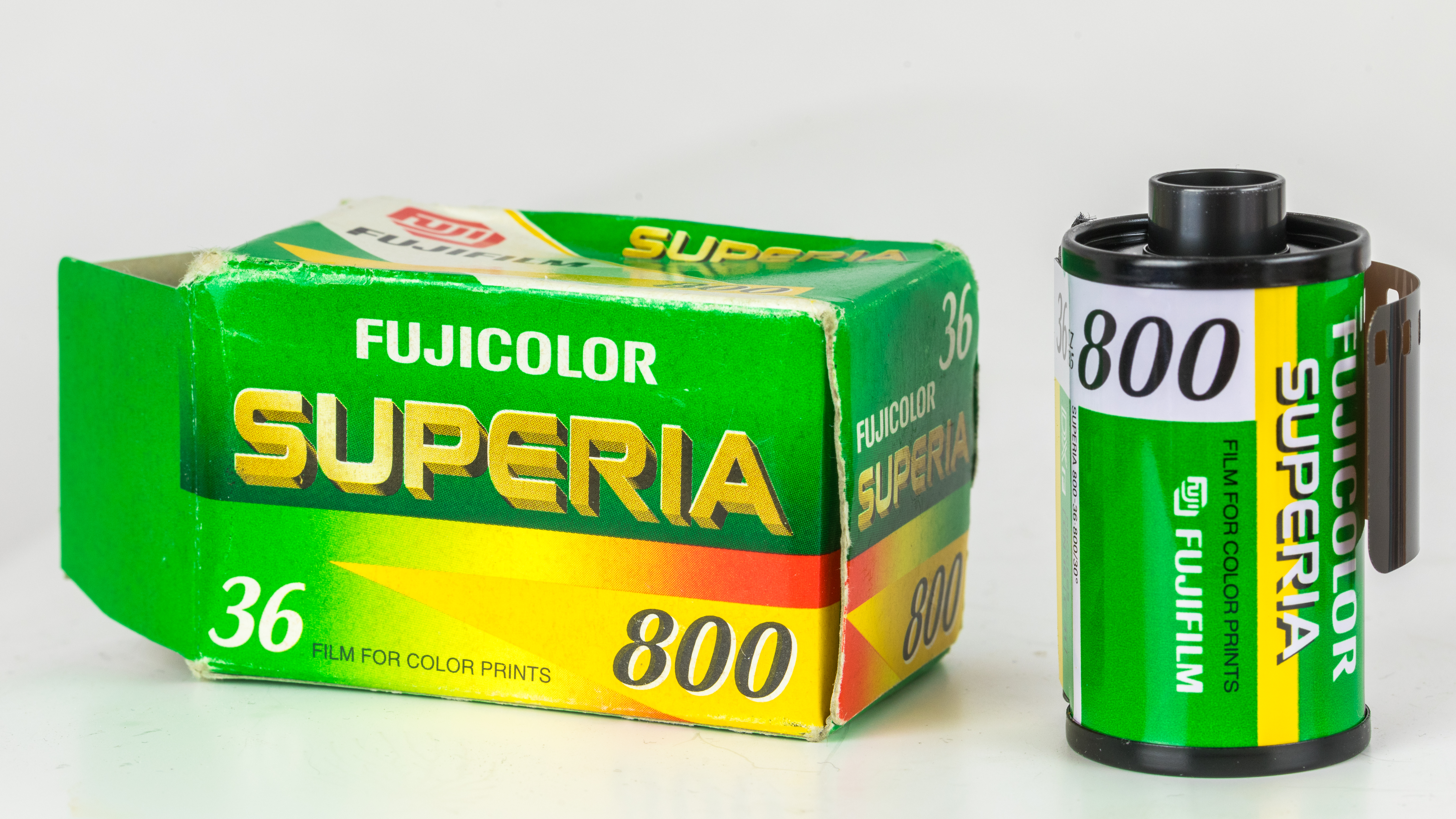
36 exposure package and roll of Fujicolor Superia 800, pre-2001 specimen

High speed 800 ISO daylight consumer color negative films using 4th layer and nano grain technology aimed at zoom lens compact cameras. X-tra 800 was sold globally whilst Venus 800 was the Japanese market variant. Both shared the same emulsion code CZ, but there were claimed differences. Both films were manufactured in 135 format only, 27 exp (Venus) and 36 exp (X-tra 800 & Venus). Superia X-tra 800 was discontinued in 2016 outside Japan, final stock with 8/18 expiry dates. Venus 800, the Japanese market version continued to be available and was sold as a parallel import. In May 2019 Fujifilm announced the discontinuation of Venus 800 in Japan with supply expected to last until December 2019. Parallel imports into Western Europe ceased at that time. Limited stock remained with retailers into early 2020.

=== Superia 1600/Natura 1600 ===
The fastest multi-purpose color negative film in the Superia line. Daylight-type ISO 1600 color negative film that incorporates a 4th Color Layer and the newly developed Nano-structured Σ(Sigma) Grain Technology (Code CU). Aimed at use in compact zoom lens cameras and flash photography under low light conditions. Superia 1600 was discontinued outside Japan in 2016. Natura 1600 the Japanese market version, branded after the Natura range of compact cameras continued to be available, including as parallel import elsewhere although only as single rolls (multipacks discontinued in Japan October 2016). Full discontinuation was announced Oct 2017, stock lasted to May/June 18 in Europe (parallel imported), having sold out first in Japan. 135 format only.

=== Press 400, 800 & 1600 ===
A professional film made by Fujifilm in 400, 800 & 1600 ISO speeds. It uses the same emulsions as Superia at those speeds, but has been specially handled (refrigerated) since the time of manufacture.

== See also ==
- List of photographic films
- List of discontinued photographic films
