= Neopan =

Black and white films from Fujifilm

Neopan 100 ACROS II
- Maker: Fujifilm
- Speed: 100/21°
- Type: B&W print
- Process: Gelatin-silver
- Format: 135, 120
- Exposure latitude: ±2½ stops
- Application: General purpose, Sports, Daylight
- Introduced: November 2019

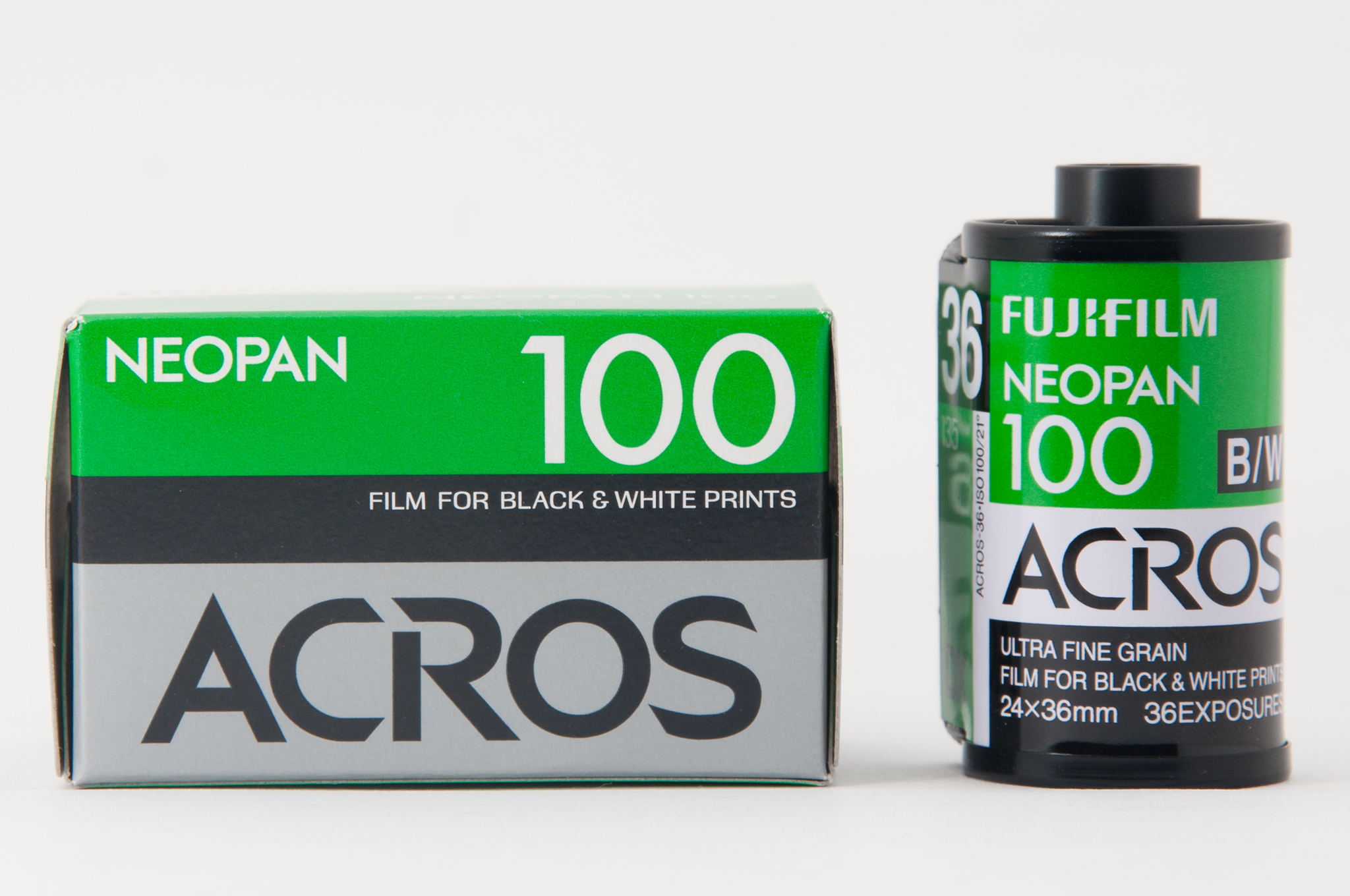
The Fujifilm Neopan 100 ACROS B/W film 35mm

Neopan 400CN
- Maker: Fujifilm
- Speed: 400/27°
- Type: B&W print
- Process: C-41
- Format: 135, 120
- Application: General purpose, chromogenic
- Introduced: 2003
- Discontinued: 2020

Neopan 100 ACROS
- Maker: Fujifilm
- Speed: 100/21°
- Type: B&W print
- Process: Gelatin-silver
- Format: 135, 120, Sheet film
- Exposure latitude: ±2½ stops
- Application: General purpose, Sports, Daylight
- Introduced: 2000
- Discontinued: October 2018

Neopan SS
- Maker: Fujifilm
- Speed: 100/21°
- Type: B&W print
- Process: Gelatin-silver
- Format: 135, 120, Sheet film
- Application: General purpose
- Introduced: 1952
- Discontinued: 2011

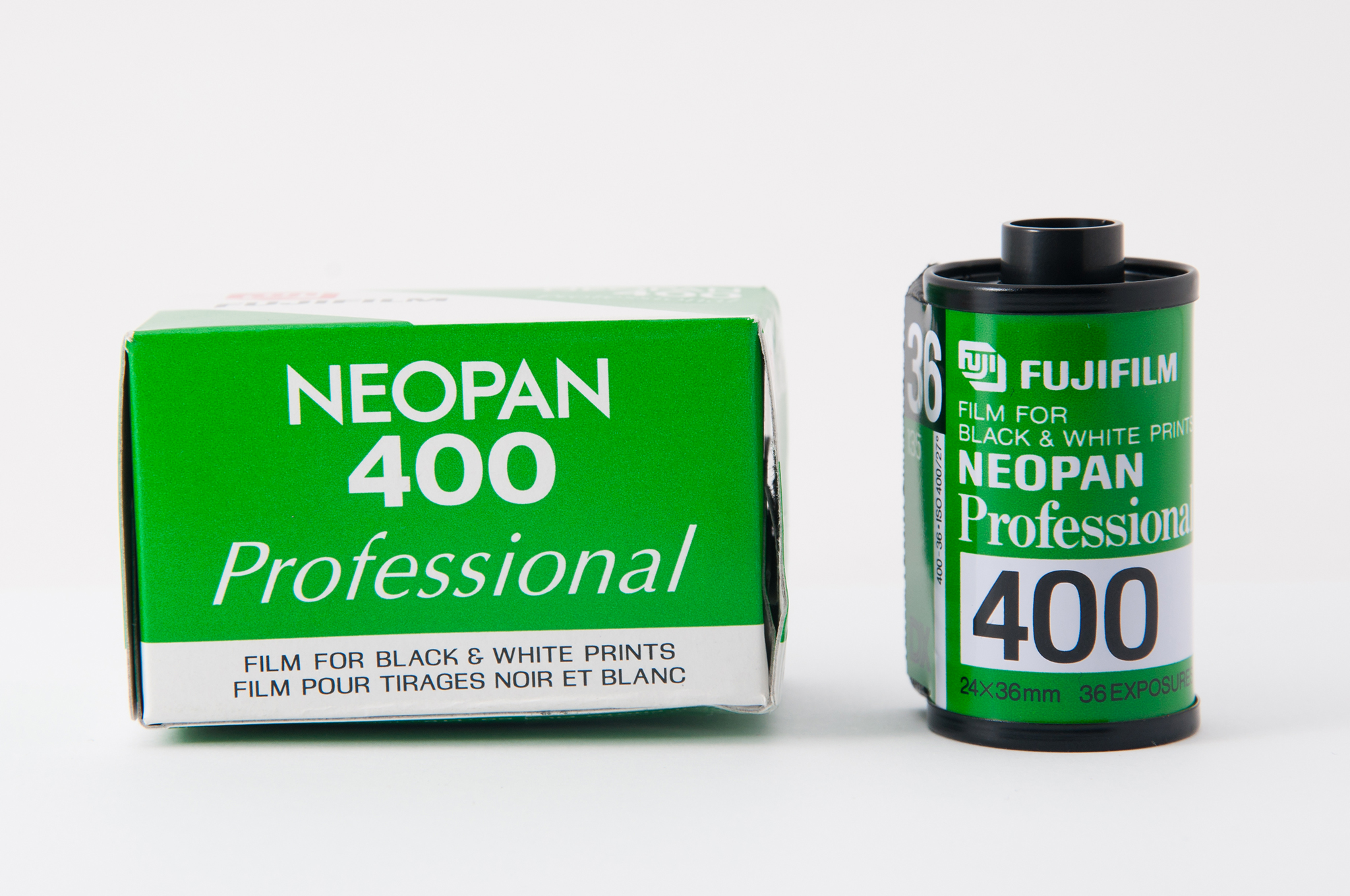
Fujifilm Neopan 400 black and white film for 35mm cameras

Neopan 400
- Maker: Fujifilm
- Speed: 400/27°
- Type: B&W print
- Process: Gelatin-silver
- Format: 135, 120
- Exposure latitude: ±2½ stops
- Application: General purpose, Sports, Low light
- Introduced: 1978
- Discontinued: 2013

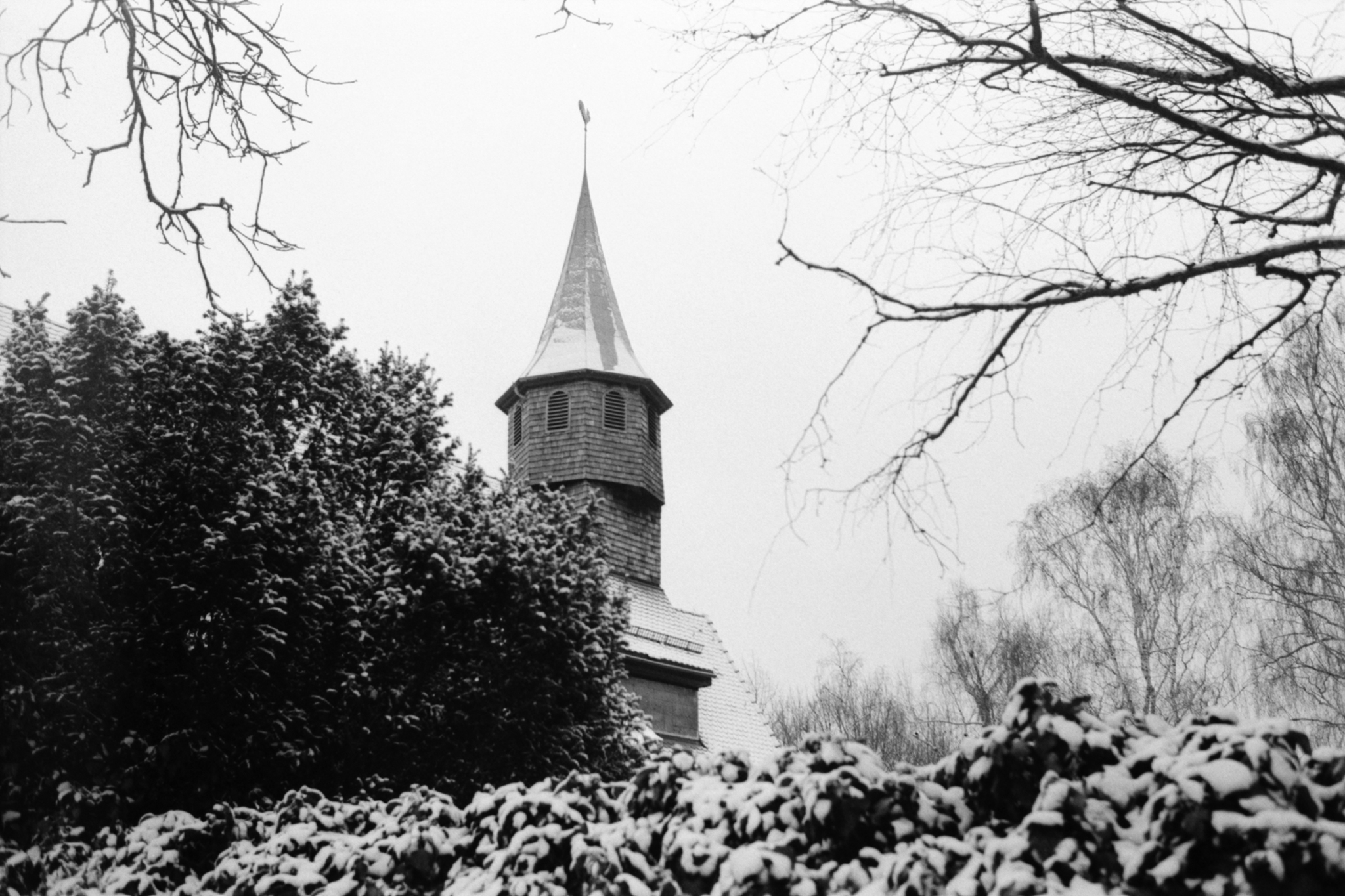
Picture taken with the Fuji Neopan 400

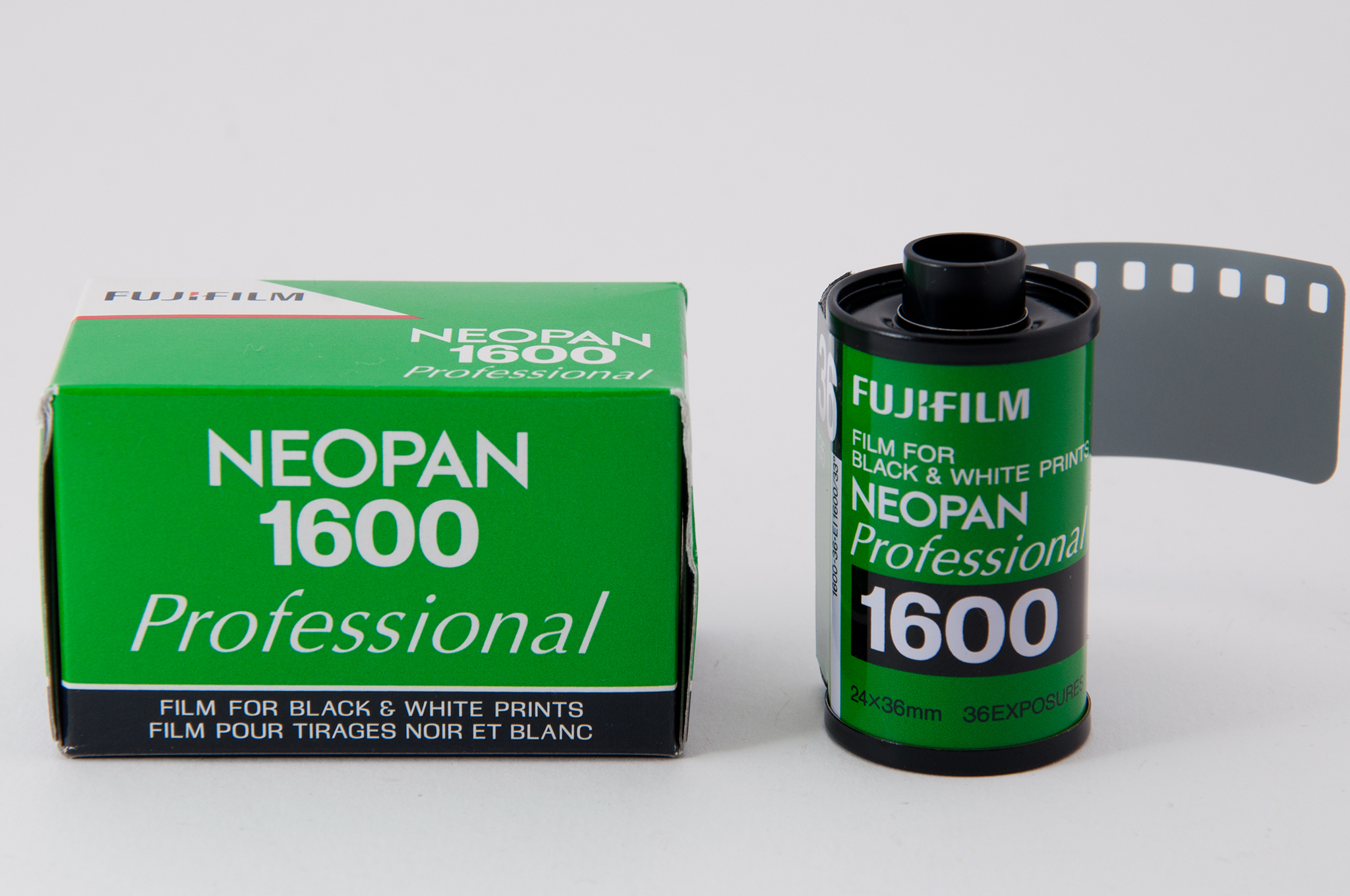
The Fujifilm Neopan 1600 B/W film for 35mm cameras

Neopan 1600
- Maker: Fujifilm
- Speed: 1600/33°
- Type: B&W print
- Process: Gelatin-silver
- Format: 135
- Exposure latitude: ±2 stops
- Application: General purpose, Sports, Low light, Night
- Discontinued: 2010

Neopan was originally a family of black-and-white films from Japanese manufacturer Fujifilm for both professional and amateur use. The range now only comprises one film; Neopan ACROS 100 II, a traditional silver halide black and white film re-launched in 2019 and currently sold worldwide.

== Current Films ==
=== Neopan ACROS 100 II ===
After the discontinuation of ACROS in April 2018, just over a year later in June 2019 Fujifilm announced their return to traditional silver halide black and white film with an updated Neopan ACROS 100 II. Film shipments commenced in Japan in November 2019, with global availability expected from Spring 2020.

A reformulated version of Neopan 100 ACROS,“achieving ultra-high image quality with world-class granularity and three-dimensional tone reproduction" to address the loss of some component raw materials that led to the original's withdrawal. This new emulsion appears to differ slightly from the original ACROS with "the gradation of the highlight part [..] designed to be sharper" according to machine translations of the Japanese press release. The film retains the reciprocity characteristics of the original. Formats: 135-36 exp. and 120 single rolls.

The new packaging for 120 format comes with 'Made in UK' labelling and is only available in single rolls compared to Fujifilms normal 5-roll packs leading to speculation about the films origin. Although the emulsion coating is still undertaken at the Kanagawa Factory, Ashigara in Japan, users speculate that conversion and packaging has been outsourced to Harman Technology in the UK.

== Discontinued Films ==
=== Fuji Orthochrome ===
The first Fuji film for still cameras, not sensitive to green or red light, released in 1936, available only as roll film (120 and others).

=== Fuji Chrome ===
Sensitive to blue and green but not red, released in 1936, available only as roll film.

=== Fuji Neochrome ===
Sensitive to blue and green/yellow but not red, released in 1936, available only as roll film.

=== Fuji Neo Panchromatic Film ===
Sensitive across more of the visible spectrum, released in 1937, available only as roll film.

=== Fuji 35mm Film SP ===
SP stood for super panchromatic. It was Fuji's first general-use 35mm (135 size) film, released in 1938. The film required being loaded manually into a 35mm cassette in a darkroom. It had a speed of 40 ISO.

=== Fuji 35mm Film FP ===
FP stood for fine grain panchromatic. It was a grain improvement over SP, released in 1940.

=== Neopan S ===
Neopan S was a 50 ISO super fine grain film released shortly after Neopan SS, sometime between 1954 and 1958. It was advertised as panchromatic and high speed, with a nitrate base that was dangerous if exposed to heat or flame.

=== Neopan SS ===
Neopan SS was a 100 ISO, fine grain, ortho-panchromatic film with a wide exposure latitude introduced as a roll film in 1952 and 35mm in 1953. The film came with a 2.5 times sensitivity increase in comparison to what Fujifilm was currently producing (SP). Over the years, improvements were made to this film. In 1961, Fuji's 35mm films were switched over to preloaded 35mm cassettes, rather than require the photographer to load it themselves in a darkroom. It was sold in Asia and selected markets, parallel import elsewhere. The film was packaged for 35mm, medium format, and sheet film cameras in various sizes and discontinued in 2011. It had similar spectral sensitivity characteristics to Kodak Plus-X 125, discontinued in the same year.

=== Neopan SSS ===
Neopan SSS was a 200 ISO film marketed as panchromatic ultra high speed safety film. It was released shortly after Neopan SS, sometime between 1954 and 1958. It was produced until the 1980s, when it was replaced by Neopan 1600.

=== Neopan F ===
Neopan F was a 32 ISO ultra fine grain film. It was released shortly after Neopan SS, sometime between 1954 and 1958. It was discontinued in the early 2000s.

=== Neopan 400 Professional (Presto) ===
Neopan 400 Professional ('Presto' in Japan) was a high speed, black and white negative film with an ISO speed of 400 for action and press photography. It was produced for 35mm, medium format and 4x5" cameras starting from 1978 and discontinued in 2013.

=== Neopan 1600 Professional (Super Presto) ===
Neopan 1600 Professional ('Super Presto' in Japan) was an ultra high speed panchromatic film with E.I. 1600 for sports, journalism, stage shows and low light situations. It offers the same development time as Neopan ACROS 100 and Neopan 400 to enable the films to be processed together. It was produced for 35mm cameras from the 1980s and discontinued in 2009.

=== Neopan 400CN ===
Neopan 400CN was an ISO 400 General purpose C-41 process chromogenic B&W film on a triacetate base. Ilford were Fuji’s partners for this film which has therefore similar characteristics to Ilford XP2 plus. Since at least 2018 distribution was limited to the UK only and was discontinued in 2020. Formats: 135, 120.

=== Neopan ACROS 100 ===
ACROS was an ISO 100 speed professional ortho-panchromatic black-and-white photographic film for portraits, landscape, architectural subjects and product photography. It used fuji color film technology to give high sharpness and fine grain. The film was particularly suited for night and long exposure photography due to its reciprocity characteristics: it does not require adjustments for exposures shorter than 120 seconds, and only requires a ½ stop of compensation for exposures between 120 and 1000 seconds. The film was produced in 135, 120 and Sheet film formats.

ACROS sheet film (4x5" & 8x10") was discontinued in October 2017. ACROS in the remaining 135 and 120 formats was discontinued in April 2018. 120 format was largely sold out by June 2018, whilst 135 format stock remained on sale in most markets until Spring 2019. All Fujifilm black and white photopapers were also discontinued at the same time. The lack of availability of some of the film component raw materials was cited as the reason for its withdrawal.

== See also ==
- List of photographic films
- List of discontinued photographic films
