= Sensitometry =

Study of light-sensitive materials

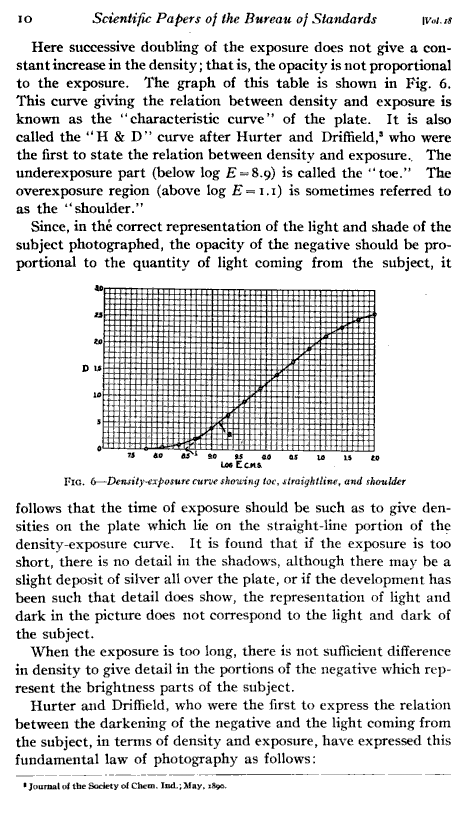
Page 10 of Raymond Davis Jr. and F. M. Walters, Jr., Scientific Papers of the Bureau of Standards, No. 439 (Part of Vol. 18) "Sensitometry of Photographic Emulsions and a Survey of the Characteristics of Plates and Films of American Manufacture," 1922. The next page starts with the H & D quote: "In a theoretically perfect negative, the amounts of silver deposited in the various parts are proportional to the logarithms of the intensities of light proceeding from the corresponding parts of the object." The assumption here, based on empirical observations, is that the "amount of silver" is proportional to the optical density.

Sensitometry is the scientific study of light-sensitive materials, especially photographic film. The study has its origins in the work by Ferdinand Hurter and Vero Charles Driffield (circa 1876) with early black-and-white emulsions. They determined how the density of silver produced varied with the amount of light received, and the method and time of development.

== Details ==
Plots of film density (log of opacity) versus the log of exposure are called characteristic curves, Hurter–Driffield curves, H–D curves, HD curves, H & D curves, D–logE curves, or D–logH curves. At moderate exposures, the overall shape is typically a bit like an "S" slanted so that its base and top are horizontal. There is usually a central region of the HD curve which approximates to a straight line, called the "linear" or "straight-line" portion; the slope of this region is called the gamma. The low end is called the "toe", and at the top, the curve rounds over to form the "shoulder". At extremely high exposures, the density may come back down, an effect known as solarisation.

Different commercial film materials cover a gamma range from about 0.5 to about 5. Often it is not the original film that one views but a second or later generation. In these cases the end-to-end gamma is approximately the product of the separate gammas. Photographic paper prints have end-to-end gammas generally somewhat over 1. Projection transparencies for dark surround viewing have end-to-end gamma approximately 1.5. A full set of HD curves for a film shows how these vary with developer type and time.

== Sensitometry and film in television ==
Conventional 35 mm. and 16 mm. motion picture films are widely used to supplement television programmes. They carry images which are visually similar to those used in the cinema. Continuous-tone images are derived from conventional motion picture cameras, whilst images built up in the form of line structures are derived from telerecordings. To synthesise a moving picture these films are projected at the rate of 25 frames per second—the television picture frequency in Great Britain instead of 24 frames per second as in the motion picture industry. In America the television picture frequency is 30 frames per second and this raises considerable problems when conventional motion pictures which have been shot for the cinema at 24 frames per second are to be televised.

Although films originally made for television in Great Britain (whether by telerecording or by conventional cinematography) will be photographed at 25 frames per second, films exposed for cinema exhibition at 24 frames per second are also transmitted for television at 25 frames per second. This naturally causes an increase in the speed of image movement and raises the frequency of sound reproduction by approximately 4 per cent. (this results in the pitch of musical notes rising by something less than a semi-tone and is acceptable to all but the most critical ear).

Five types of film image are acceptable for television transmission: (1) conventional motion picture camera negatives, (2) conventional motion picture laboratory positive prints derived from (1), (3) telerecordings made by filming a cathode-ray tube display to produce a negative image, (4) telerecordings as in (3) but arranged to produce a direct positive image on the original telerecording camera film, (5) motion picture laboratory prints made from (3).

Gamma-control amplifiers in television transmission equipment are capable of inverting the phase or contrast relationship of the signal—in practice this means that an incoming negative image can be electronically converted eventually to appear as a positive image displayed by the television receiver. This facility may also be employed during live studio transmissions, for special trick effects, and is not confined only to film work. Because of this it is not necessary to make prints from motion picture negatives before they can be utilised in television programmes although, for several reasons connected with programme acquisition and distribution, it often happens that positive film images are used. Furthermore, the presence of any dirt or dust on the film will appear as a white spot when negative is transmitted, but as a black spot if a positive film is transmitted. Since black spots are far less noticeable to the viewer, this is one strong reason for transmitting positive film images whenever possible.

In television the original image passes through many stages before finally emerging as a recognisable picture but, in all cases, the film is ultimately projected via a telecine machine—this is basically a special form of film projector in conjunction with a television camera. Telecine equipment scans the pictorial image information and creates an electrical version of the picture in terms of a television signal. This signal is eventually converted back into a recognisable picture when, at suitably modified strength, it energises the phosphor in the cathode-ray tube of the domestic receiver.

Apart from the widely employed factors such as log-exposure, density, opacity and transmission, sensitometric control of film for television transmission is also particularly concerned with contrast ratios. The definition of contrast ratio is therefore re-stated as follows : 'The ratio between the opacities of the darkest and lightest points in the film image', thus:

contrast ratio = ^{O}max. / ^{O}min.

As we have already seen, opacity is not easily measured with standard photographic equipment—but the logarithm of opacity is continually measured since, in fact, it is the unit of image saturation known as density. Since density is a logarithm we must take the ratio of the anti-logarithms of the maximum and minimum densities in the image in order to arrive at the contrast ratio. This may be written so:

contrast ratio = antilog ( D_{max.}— D_{min.} )

If this is applied to the well-known B.B.C. Test Card 'C', we find that, in the positive film version of the card, the maximum density is 2.0 whilst the minimum density is 0.3. Therefore the contrast ratio is as follows:

contrast ratio = antilog (2.0 — 0.3)

= antilog (1.7)

= 50

Therefore contrast ratio = 50 : 1 (50 to 1).

When applied to the negative film version of the same test card, the maximum density is 1.30 although the minimum density remains at 0.30. The contrast ratio of the negative is therefore as follows:

contrast ratio = antilog (1.3-0.3)

= antilog (1.0)

= 10

Therefore contrast ratio = 10: 1 (10 to 1).

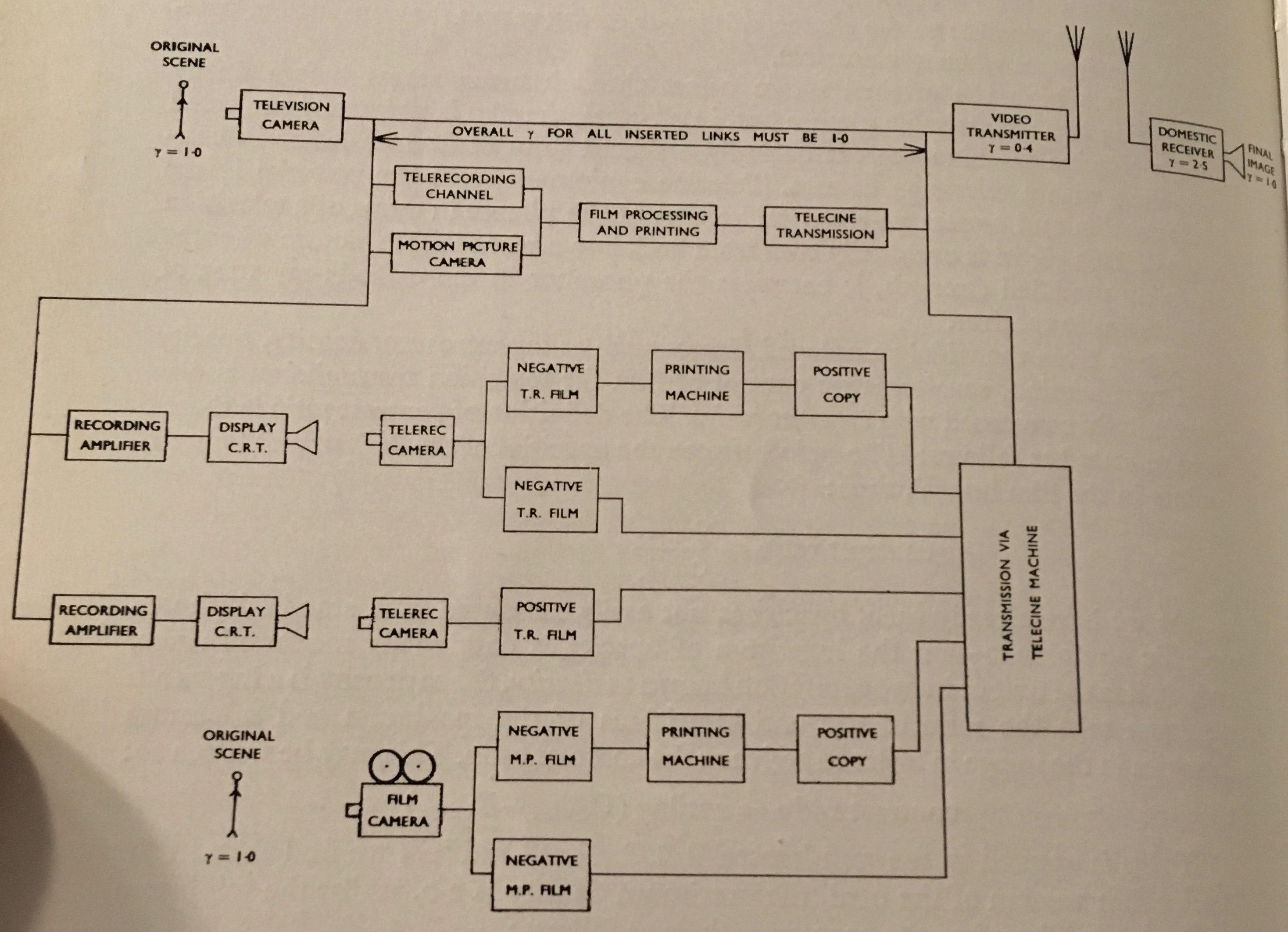
Fig.1. Monochrome Telefilm Transmission.

Figure 1 illustrates the several ways in which the viewer may receive monochrome television pictures. At the top of the diagram we see that an original scene is fed from the television camera during a live transmission via a video transmitter having a gamma value of 0.4. Since the cathode-ray tube in the domestic receiver has an effective gamma value of 2.5, the final screen picture will be at a gamma of 1.0—equal to the original scene. Film is used to supplement television programmes in two ways; either originating as a telerecording or as a motion picture film. In any event it must pass through film processing and possibly printing equipment before reaching the telecine machine and, in all cases, the overall gamma for the entire film-using system must be 1.0 so that, for example, sections of film may be inter-cut with live transmissions. One example of this is, of course, the many sections of television newsfilm material rapidly intercut with live announcements by the newsreader.

The telerecording film chain can be arranged to produce a direct negative-image film recording, a direct positive-image film recording, or a positive print can be made from the negative. In the first two cases we have the following four units in which local gamma or effective image contrast may be adjusted:

The recording channel amplifier.

The display cathode-ray tube.

The negative and positive film processing.

The telecine transmitting machine.

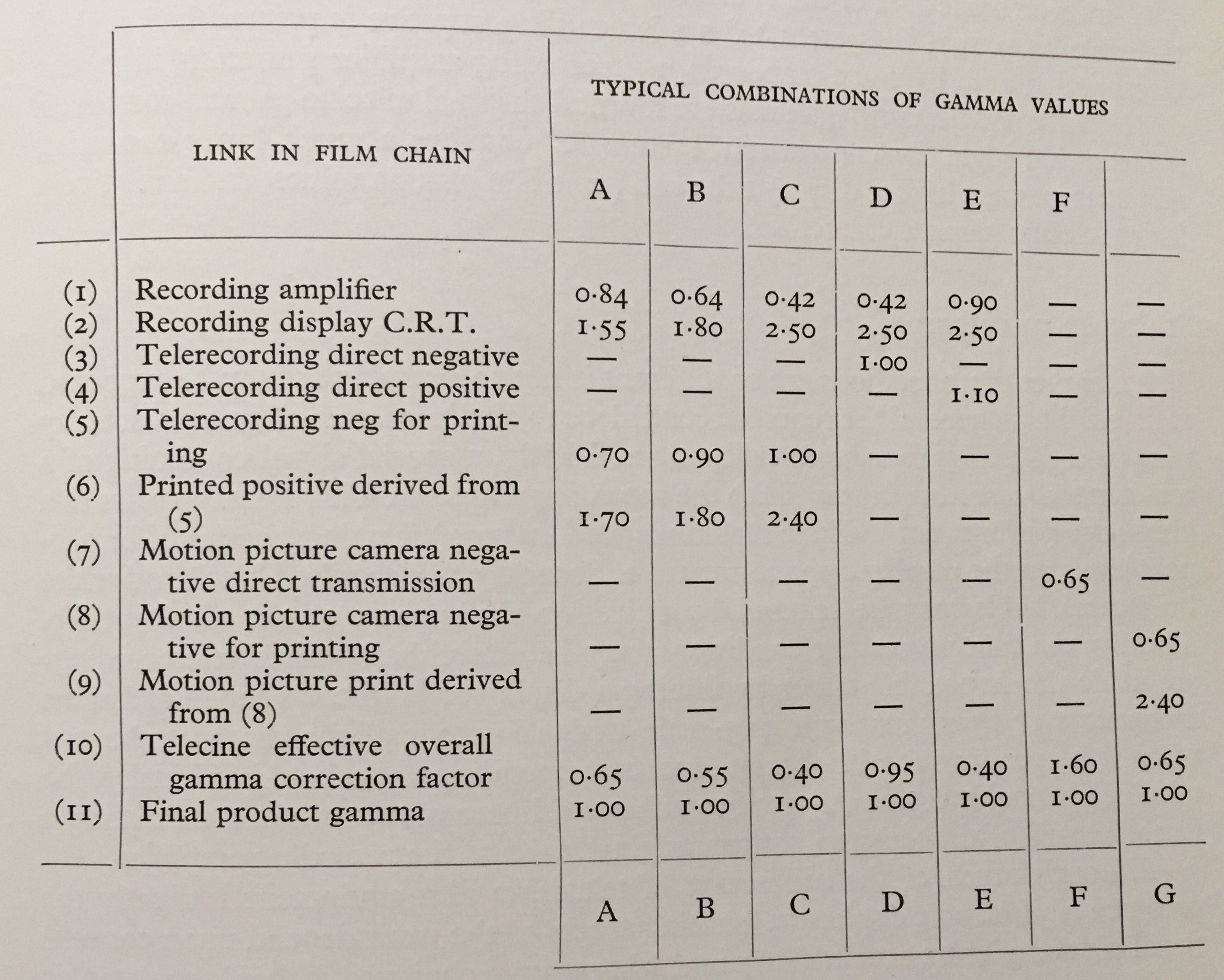
Fig. 2. Combinations of gamma values in film chain.

In the remaining case the gamma of the film printing machine and also of the positive film processing must also be accommodated. When motion picture films are made for television purposes the conditions shown at the foot of Figure 1 will apply. Here it is possible to transmit the negative film image directly by phase or contrast inversion, or to make a positive film copy and to transmit this instead, in either case the gamma of the films plus the telecine equipment must result in a product-gamma of unity.

There are several ways of displaying the picture which is to be telerecorded; there are several types of film on which to make the recording; there are various types of telerecording cameras, some of which record a so-called suppressed-field image, whilst others record full information; finally, there are various types of telecine equipment, such as vidicon or flying-spot image transducers. It is quite impossible to discuss all the various techniques and fundamental principles of television equipment in a book of this nature; for similar reasons, it is not possible to quote one fixes set of gamma and density values which, one achieved, would satisfy each stage of the various combinations of equipment involved in the basic methods outlined in Figure 1.

However, some idea of the variations which may be encountered is gained from the table on Figure 2. In system 'A' a telerecording negative is printed before final transmission and, by some standards, the recording amplifier gamma is high, the display tube and film print gammas are low and the final telecine gamma correction is somewhat high. By comparison, system 'C' employs a much lower recording amplifier gamma, higher display tube and print film gamma values, and a relatively lower telecine gamma correction.

== See also ==
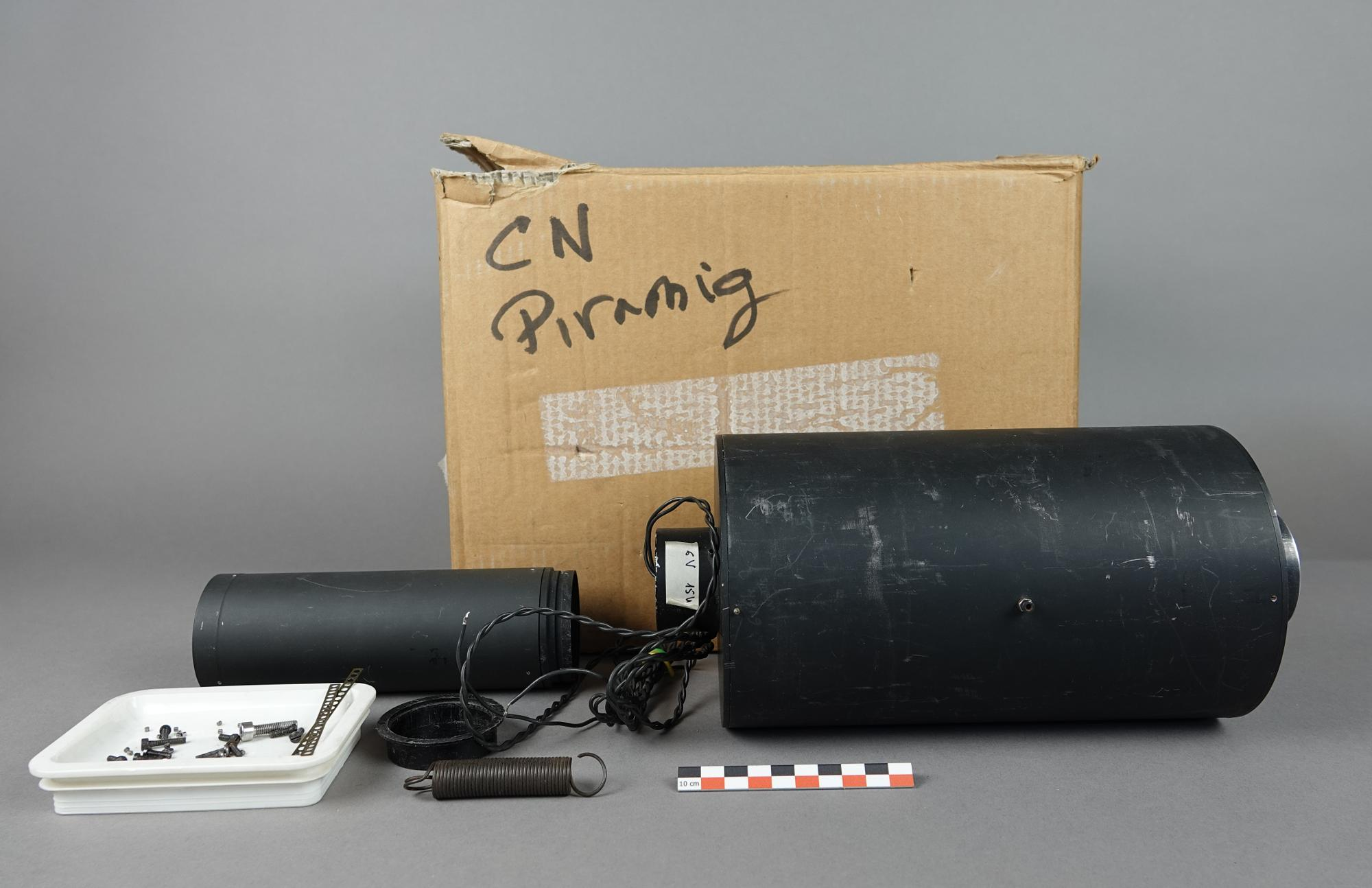
Sensitometer from the Institut d'Astrophysique de Paris (Sorbonne University).

- Film speed
- Densitometry
- Callier Effect
- Leon Warnerke, inventor of the first practical sensitometer in 1880
- Hurter and Driffield
- Josef Maria Eder – Eder–Hecht neutral wedge sensitometer
- Julius Scheiner – Scheiner sensitometer
- Emanuel Goldberg - Goldberg mirror, Goldberg wedge, Goldberg gamma rule, contributions to sensitometry
- Spectral sensitivity
- Zone system
