= Solarization (photography) =

Photographic tone reversal due to overexposure

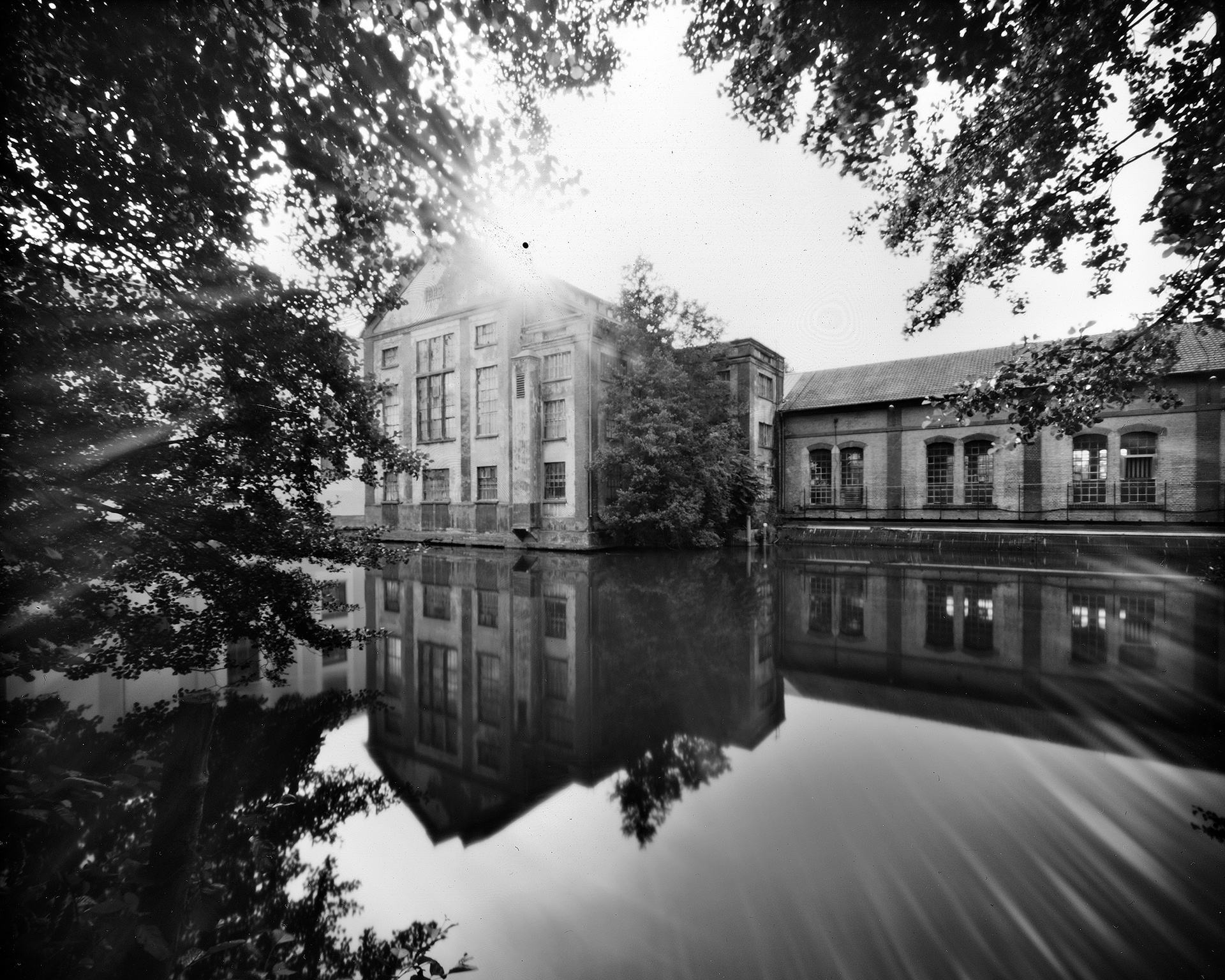
Photograph exhibiting solarization effect: the sun appears black.

In analog photography, solarization is the effect of tone reversal observed in cases of extreme overexposure of the photographic film in the camera. Most likely, the effect was first observed in landscape photographs including the sun. The sun, instead of being the whitest spot in the image, turned black or grey. For instance, Minor White's photograph of a winter scene, The Black Sun 1955, was a result of the shutter of his camera freezing in the open position, producing severe overexposure. Ansel Adams also earlier created a solarized sun image, titled Black Sun, Owens Valley, California, 1939, by overexposure.

== Definition ==
When a photographic layer, suitable for solarization (see below), is exposed to actinic radiation, the resulting darkening after development will not increase steadily, but reaches a maximum which decreases under more intense exposure. In general, the phenomenon is only then called solarization if the exposure has been produced in one "shot", meaning no pauses or double exposures. The exposure to achieve solarization can be increased by exposure time or by increasing the light intensity

In photographic practice, solarization refers to the complete or partial reversal of image tones caused by extreme overexposure: beyond a certain point, additional exposure (1,000 to 10,000 times that required to produce the maximum density of which the material is capable) no longer increases the developed density but reduces it, so that the brightest parts of the subject — classically the sun itself — appear dark in the print.

== History ==
The solarization effect was already known to Daguerre and is one of the earliest known effects in photography. John William Draper was the first to call the overexposure effect solarization. J. W. F. Herschel had already observed the reversal of the image from negative to positive by extreme overexposure in 1840. Also N. M. P. Lerebours observed the phenomenon in 1842 (without him recognizing what it was) when he made a daguerreotype of an image of the sun. The result was seen as unsatisfactory because the solar disk (image of the sun on the daguerreotype plate) was overexposed and solarized. Ludwig Moser reported in 1843: "...that the light in the camera obscura produces at first the well known negative image; with continued action of the light the image turns into a positive image.... and recently I have obtained in fact on occasion a third image which is negative". In 1880 Janssen had obtained in the strongest sunlight (with refractors), a repetition of the solarization phenomena. The different phases through which the picture passes are: (1) negative; (2) a neutral condition (total intensification); (3) a positive; (4) a second neutral condition, in which the plate becomes uniformly light in the developer; (5) a negative of the second order; (6) a third neutral condition, of uniform intensification.

== Explanation ==
=== Source ===
The first theories explaining solarization originated from W. de W. Abney. He argued in 1873 that, under strong light, the subhalide Ag_{2}Br oxidizes to a difficult-to-reduce oxyhalide, preventing the developer from achieving effective reduction, resulting in a lower density of the developed silver, thus creating the effect. J.M. Eder, R. Luther, and E. English thought that Bromine would be released upon exposure to light, thereby hardening the gelatine. This would affect the diffusion of the developer to the grains. But also gelatine-free emulsions show solarization; therefore, this simple theory cannot be the true explanation of solarization. Until 1928, solarization was generally understood as a combination of two main processes: the coagulation (clotting) theory and the regression or rehalogenization theory:

=== Regression theory ===
The regression process theory was formulated by H. Luppo-Cramer in 1911, based on research by F. Hurter, V. C. Driffield and H. Luggin. By exposure, the surface and the interior of a silver-bromide sphere will disintegrate by the expulsion of bromide. Whereas the bromide on the surface can permeate away, the bromide can not so easily permeate away from the interior. The overexposure now generates a bromide pressure that escapes from the internal sphere and permeates to the surface, where it oxidizes the latent image there, thereby forming the regular latent image under normal exposures. This destroys the latent image because only the surface silver can be developed.

=== Coagulation theory ===
H. Arens published a paper in 1925 on reversal effects in which he concluded that solarization is based on the finding that under increasing exposure, the latent image successively coagulates, thereby increasing the size of each particular silver speck. This again causes the silver speck to lose its catalytic effect for the development.

=== Rebromination theory ===
Heinz Kieser published a paper in 1928 in which he speculated about the possibility of bromine migration by defect electrons (see: Photosensitivity).

The rebromination theory was experimentally supported in 1940 by a series of experiments conducted by Webb and Evans (Kodak Research Laboratories): exposures across a temperature range of +68 °C to −196 °C, emulsions treated with various bromine acceptors (including semicarbazide, acetone semicarbazone, and sodium nitrite), post-treatment with silver halide solvents, comparisons between physical and chemical development, and tests with different exposure intensities all produced results consistent with the theory.

Not every photographic layer exhibits solarization. Pure chloride and iodine based silver emulsions are difficult or impossible to solarize. In general, it can be stated that solarization can only be observed if the photographic layer is capable of creating a latent image inside the halide grain under exposure by actinic radiation.

In recent years, an understanding has been agreed upon in which this bromine migration to the surface due to overexposure forms a bromine condensation, resulting in bromine molecules or bromine atoms diffusing to the silver specks of the latent image. Thus, the latent image at the crystal surface can be re-halogenated by chemical reaction, notwithstanding an increase in the amount of latent image in the interior of the crystal. Still, the regression and coagulation theories are believed to contribute up to a certain level to the solarization effect.

Despite the experimental support for the rebromination theory, the mechanism of solarization cannot be regarded as conclusively established.

== Pseudo-solarization ==
Pseudo-solarisation (or pseudo-solarization) is a phenomenon in photography in which the image recorded on a negative or on a photographic print is wholly or partially reversed in tone. Dark areas appear light or light areas appear dark. The term is synonymous with the Sabattier effect when referring to negatives. Solarisation and pseudo-solarisation are quite distinct effects.

In short, the mechanism is due to halogen ions released within the halide grain by exposure diffusing to the grain surface in amounts sufficient to destroy the latent image.
