= Hurter and Driffield =

19th-century photographic scientists

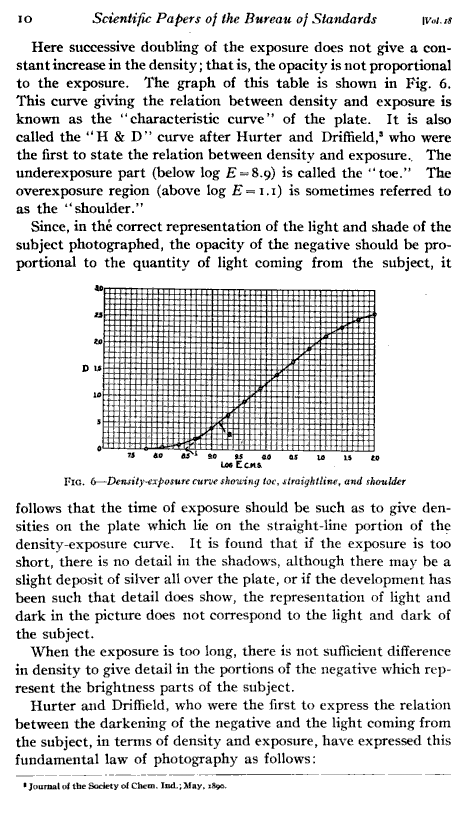
H & D curve used in sensitometry

Ferdinand Hurter (1844–1898) and Vero Charles Driffield (1848–1915) were nineteenth-century photographic scientists who brought quantitative scientific practice to photography through the methods of sensitometry and densitometry.

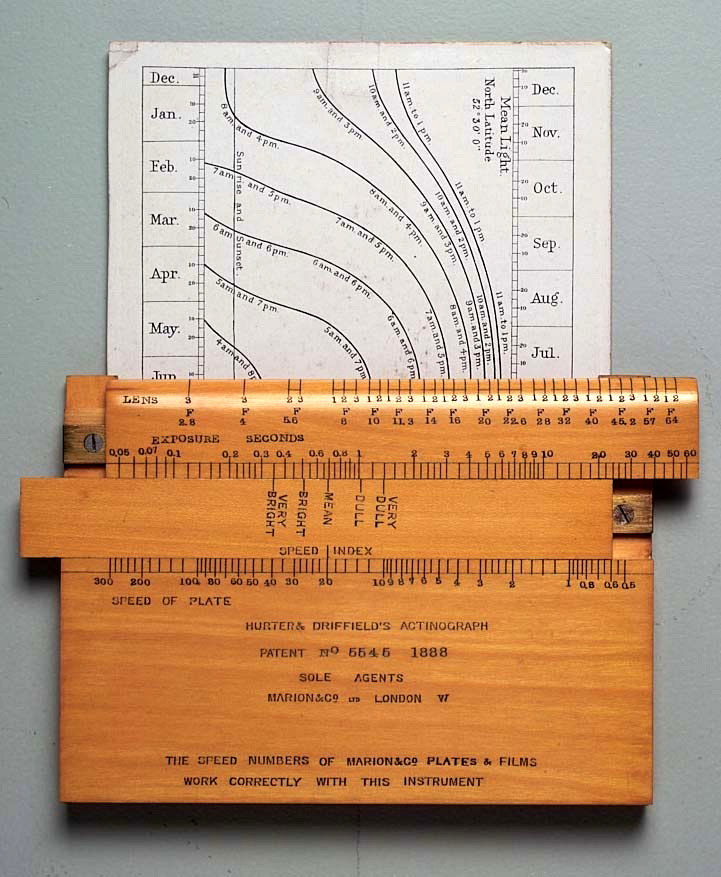
Hurter & Driffield's actinograph.

Among their other innovations was a photographic exposure estimation device known as an actinograph.

== See also ==
- H&D speed numbers, originally described in 1890, for film speed measurements
