= Film speed =

Measure of a photographic film's sensitivity to light

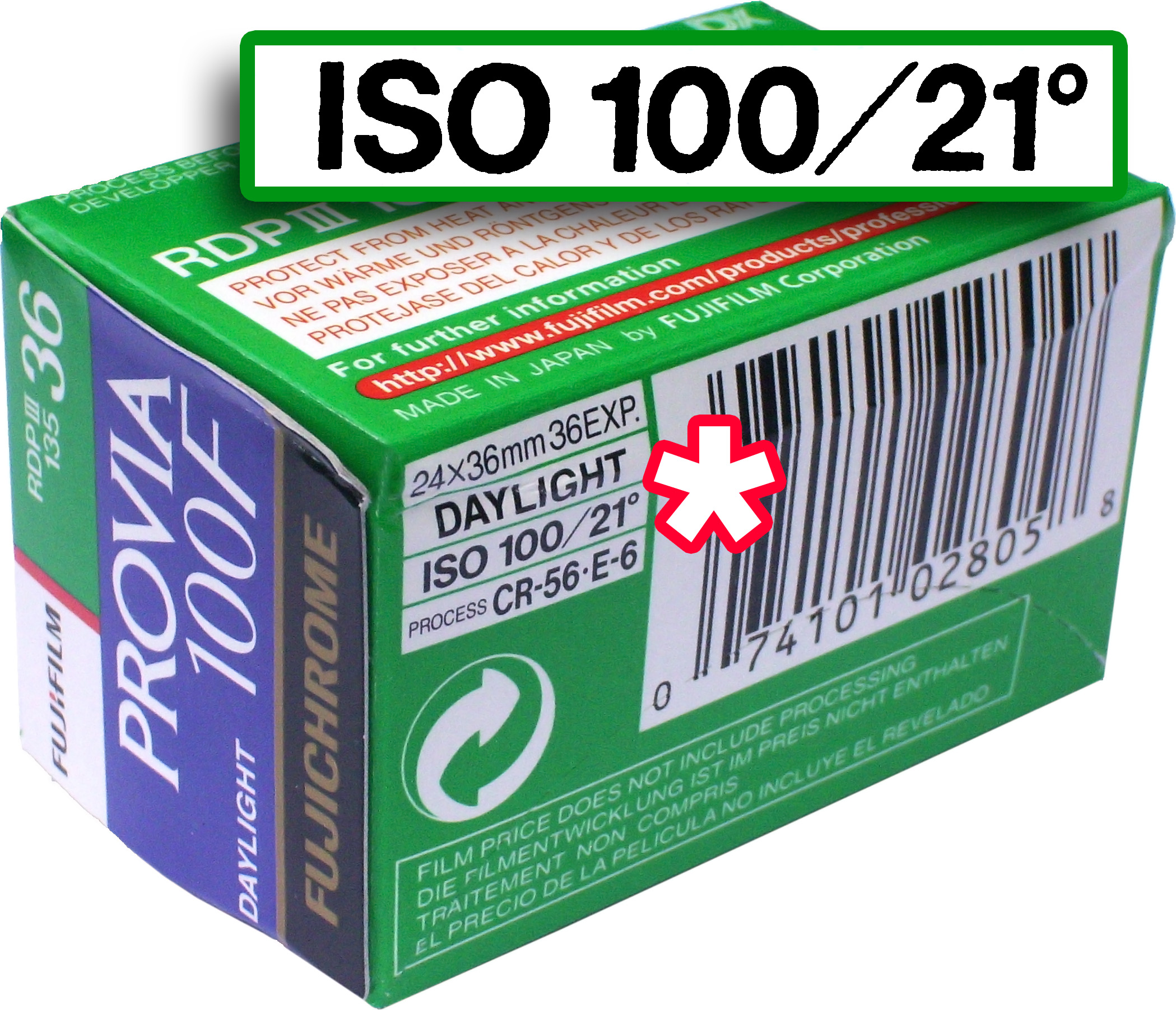
This film container denotes its speed as ISO 100/21°, including both arithmetic (100 ASA) and logarithmic (21 DIN) components. The second is often dropped, making (e.g.) "ISO 100" effectively equivalent to the older ASA speed. (As is common, the "100" in the film name alludes to its ISO rating.)

In analog photography, film speed is the measure of a photographic film's sensitivity to light; in digital photography, the term describes the lightness of an image sensor's output in relation to its exposure.

The measurement of film speeds is a concern of sensitometry, the scientific study of light-sensitive materials. Various numerical scales were developed to specify film speeds, with the most recent being the ISO system introduced in 1974. Prior to that, the ASA system were commonly used in the United States, and the DIN in Europe.

The term speed comes from the early days of photography. Photographic emulsions that were more sensitive to light needed less time to generate an acceptable image and thus a complete exposure could be finished faster, with the subjects having to hold still for a shorter length of time. Emulsions that were less sensitive were deemed "slower" as the time to complete an exposure was much longer and often usable only for still life photography. Exposure times for photographic emulsions shortened from hours to fractions of a second by the late 19th century.

In both film and digital photography, choice of speed will almost always affect image quality. Higher sensitivities, which require shorter exposures, typically result in reduced image quality due to coarser film grain or increased digital image noise. Lower sensitivities, which require longer exposures, will retain more viable image data due to finer grain or less noise, and therefore more detail. Ultimately, sensitivity is limited by the quantum efficiency of the film or sensor.

To determine the exposure time needed for a given film, a light meter is typically used.

== Film speed measurement systems ==
=== Emulsion speed rating criteria ===
Five criteria for the rating of emulsion speed have been used since the late 19th century, listed here by name and date, these criteria are: threshold (1880), inertia (1890), fixed density (1934), minimum useful gradient (1939) and fractional gradient (1939).

==== Threshold ====
The threshold criterion is the point on the characteristic curve corresponding to just perceptible density above fog.

==== Inertia ====
The inertia speed point of an emulsion is determined on the Hurter and Driffield characteristic curve by the intercept between the gradient of the straight line part of the curve and the line representing the base + fog (B+F) on the density axis.

==== Fixed density ====
The fixed density speed point is determined by defining a fixed minimum density as the basis of the emulsion speed (e.g. 0.1 above B+F).

==== Minimum useful gradient ====
The minimum useful gradient criterion places the speed point where the gradient first reaches an agreed value (e.g. tan 𝜃 = 0.2).

==== Fractional gradient ====
The fractional gradient is defined as the speed point at which the slope of the characteristic curve first reaches a fixed fraction (e.g. 0.3) of the average gradient over a range (e.g. 1.5) of the characteristic curve.

=== Historical systems ===
==== Warnerke ====
The first known practical sensitometer, which allowed measurements of the speed of photographic materials, was invented by the Polish engineer Leon Warnerke – pseudonym of Władysław Małachowski (1837–1900) – in 1880, among the achievements for which he was awarded the Progress Medal of the Photographic Society of Great Britain in 1882. It was commercialized since 1881.

The Warnerke Standard Sensitometer consisted of a frame holding an opaque screen with an array of typically 25 numbered, gradually pigmented squares brought into contact with the photographic plate during a timed test exposure under a phosphorescent tablet excited before by the light of a burning magnesium ribbon. The speed of the emulsion was then expressed in 'degrees' Warnerke (sometimes seen as Warn. or °W.) corresponding with the last number visible on the exposed plate after development and fixation. Each number represented an increase of 1/3 in speed, typical plate speeds were between 10° and 25° Warnerke at the time.

His system saw some success but proved to be unreliable due to its spectral sensitivity to light, the fading intensity of the light emitted by the phosphorescent tablet after its excitation as well as high built-tolerances. The concept, however, was later built upon in 1900 by Henry Chapman Jones (1855–1932) in the development of his plate tester and modified speed system.

==== Hurter & Driffield ====
Another early practical system for measuring the sensitivity of an emulsion was that of Hurter and Driffield (H&D), originally described in 1890, by the Swiss-born Ferdinand Hurter (1844–1898) and British Vero Charles Driffield (1848–1915). In their system, speed numbers were inversely proportional to the exposure required. For example, an emulsion rated at 250 H&D would require ten times the exposure of an emulsion rated at 2500 H&D.

The methods to determine the sensitivity were later modified in 1925 (in regard to the light source used) and in 1928 (regarding light source, developer and proportional factor)—this later variant was sometimes called "H&D 10". The H&D system was officially accepted as a standard in the former Soviet Union from 1928 until September 1951, when it was superseded by GOST 2817–50.

==== Scheiner ====
The Scheinergrade (Sch.) system was devised by the German astronomer Julius Scheiner (1858–1913) in 1894 originally as a method of comparing the speeds of plates used for astronomical photography. Scheiner's system rated the speed of a plate by the least exposure to produce a visible darkening upon development. Speed was expressed in degrees Scheiner, originally ranging from 1° to 20° Sch., with each increment of a degree corresponding to a multiplicative factor of increased light sensitivity. This multiplicative factor was determined by the constraint that an increment of 19° Sch. (from 1° to 20° Sch.) corresponded to a hundredfold increase in sensitivity. Thus emulsions that differed by 1° Sch. on the Scheiner scale were $\sqrt[19]{100} = 1.2742...$-fold more (or, less) sensitive to each other. An increment of 3° Sch. came close to a doubling of sensitivity $(\sqrt[19]{100})^3 = 2.06914...$.

The system was later extended to cover larger ranges and some of its practical shortcomings were addressed by the Austrian scientist Josef Maria Eder (1855–1944) and Flemish-born botanist Walter Hecht (1896–1960), (who, in 1919/1920, jointly developed their Eder–Hecht neutral wedge sensitometer measuring emulsion speeds in Eder–Hecht grades). It remained difficult for manufacturers to reliably determine film speeds, often only by comparing with competing products, so that an increasing number of modified semi-Scheiner-based systems started to spread, which no longer followed Scheiner's original procedures and thereby defeated the idea of comparability.

Scheiner's system was eventually abandoned in Germany, when the standardized DIN system was introduced in 1934. In various forms, it continued to be in widespread use in other countries for some time.

==== DIN ====
The DIN system, officially DIN standard 4512 by the Deutsches Institut für Normung (then known as the Deutscher Normenausschuß (DNA)), was published in January 1934. It grew out of drafts for a standardized method of sensitometry put forward by the Deutscher Normenausschuß für Phototechnik as proposed by the committee for sensitometry of the Deutsche Gesellschaft für photographische Forschung since 1930 and presented by Robert Luther (1868–1945) and Emanuel Goldberg (1881–1970) at the influential VIII. International Congress of Photography (German: Internationaler Kongreß für wissenschaftliche und angewandte Photographie) held in Dresden from 3 to 8 August 1931.

The DIN system was inspired by Scheiner's system, but the sensitivities were represented as the base 10 logarithm of the sensitivity multiplied by 10, similar to decibels. Thus an increase of 20° (and not 19° as in Scheiner's system) represented a hundredfold increase in sensitivity, and a difference of 3° was much closer to the base 10 logarithm of 2 (0.30103...):

$$\log_{10}{(2)} = 0.30103... \approx 3/10$$.

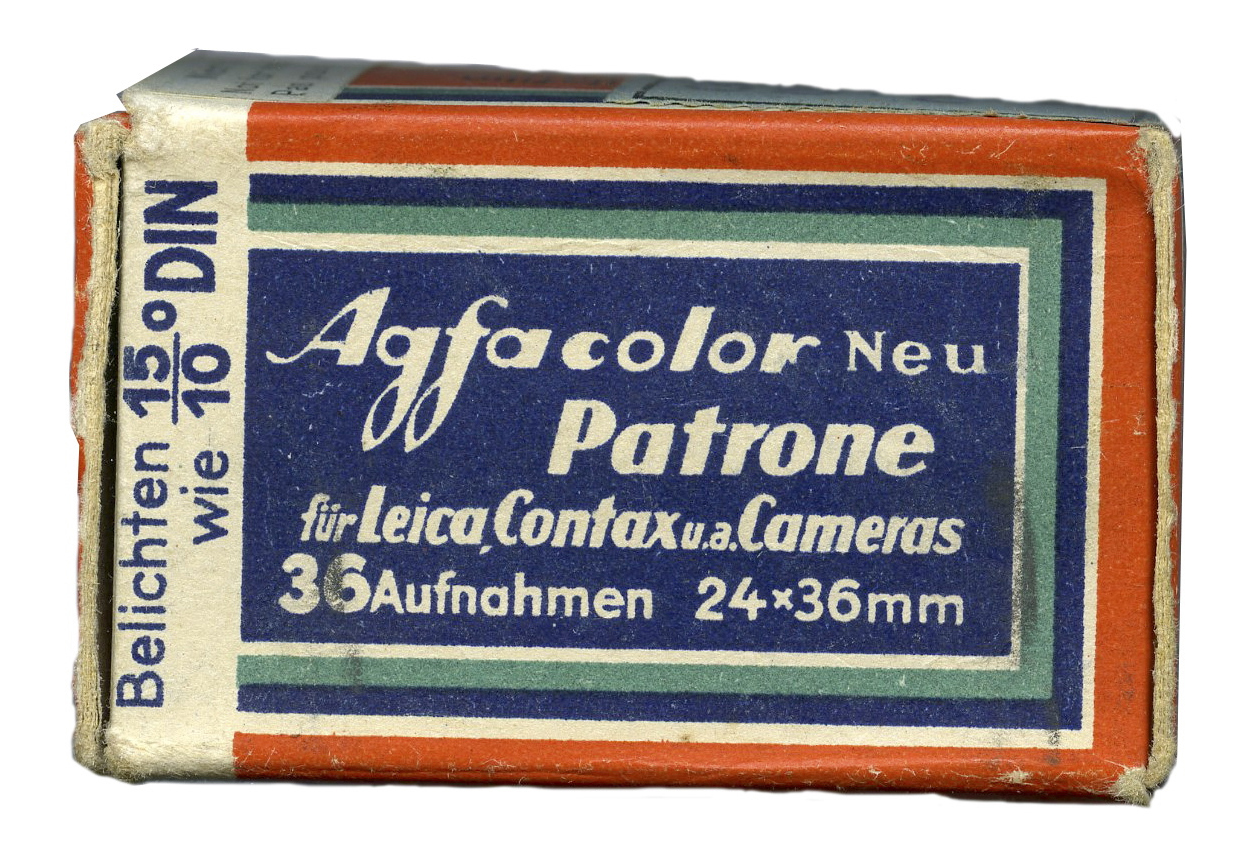
A box of Agfacolor Neu with the instruction "expose as 15/10° DIN" (in German)

As in the Scheiner system, speeds were expressed in 'degrees'. Originally the sensitivity was written as a fraction with 'tenths' (for example "18/10° DIN"), where the resultant value 1.8 represented the relative base 10 logarithm of the speed. 'Tenths' were later abandoned with DIN 4512:1957-11, and the example above would be written as "18° DIN". The degree symbol was finally dropped with DIN 4512:1961-10. This revision also saw significant changes in the definition of film speeds in order to accommodate then-recent changes in the American ASA PH2.5-1960 standard, so that film speeds of black-and-white negative film effectively would become doubled, that is, a film previously marked as "18° DIN" would now be labeled as "21 DIN" without emulsion changes.

Originally only meant for black-and-white negative film, the system was later extended and regrouped into nine parts, including DIN 4512-1:1971-04 for black-and-white negative film, DIN 4512-4:1977-06 for color reversal film and DIN 4512-5:1977-10 for color negative film.

On an international level the German DIN 4512 system has been effectively superseded in the 1980s by ISO 6:1974, ISO 2240:1982, and ISO 5800:1979 where the same sensitivity is written in linear and logarithmic form as "ISO 100/21°" (now again with degree symbol). These ISO standards were subsequently adopted by DIN as well. Finally, the latest DIN 4512 revisions were replaced by corresponding ISO standards, DIN 4512-1:1993-05 by DIN ISO 6:1996-02 in September 2000, DIN 4512-4:1985-08 by DIN ISO 2240:1998-06 and DIN 4512-5:1990-11 by DIN ISO 5800:1998-06 both in July 2002.

==== BSI ====
When BS 935:1941 was published during World War II, specifying exposure tables for negative materials, it employed the same fixed-density speed criterion used in the German DIN 4512:1934 system. The British Standard also used logarithmic speed numbers, following the example of Scheiner and DIN. When the American ASA Z38.2.1:1943 standard was published, it used a fractional gradient speed criterion and arithmetic speed numbers, for compatibility with Weston and GE.

British standard BS 1380:1947 adopted the fractional gradient criterion of the American 1943 standard, and also included arithmetic speed numbers in addition to logarithmic numbers. The logarithmic speed number proposed in the later BS 1380:1957 standard was almost identical to the DIN 4512:1957 standard, except that the BS number was +9 degrees greater than the corresponding DIN number; in 1971, the BS and DIN standards changed this to +10 degrees.

Following an increasing effort to produce international standards, the British, American, and German standards became identical in ISO 6:1974, which corresponded to BS 1380:Part1:1973.

==== Weston ====
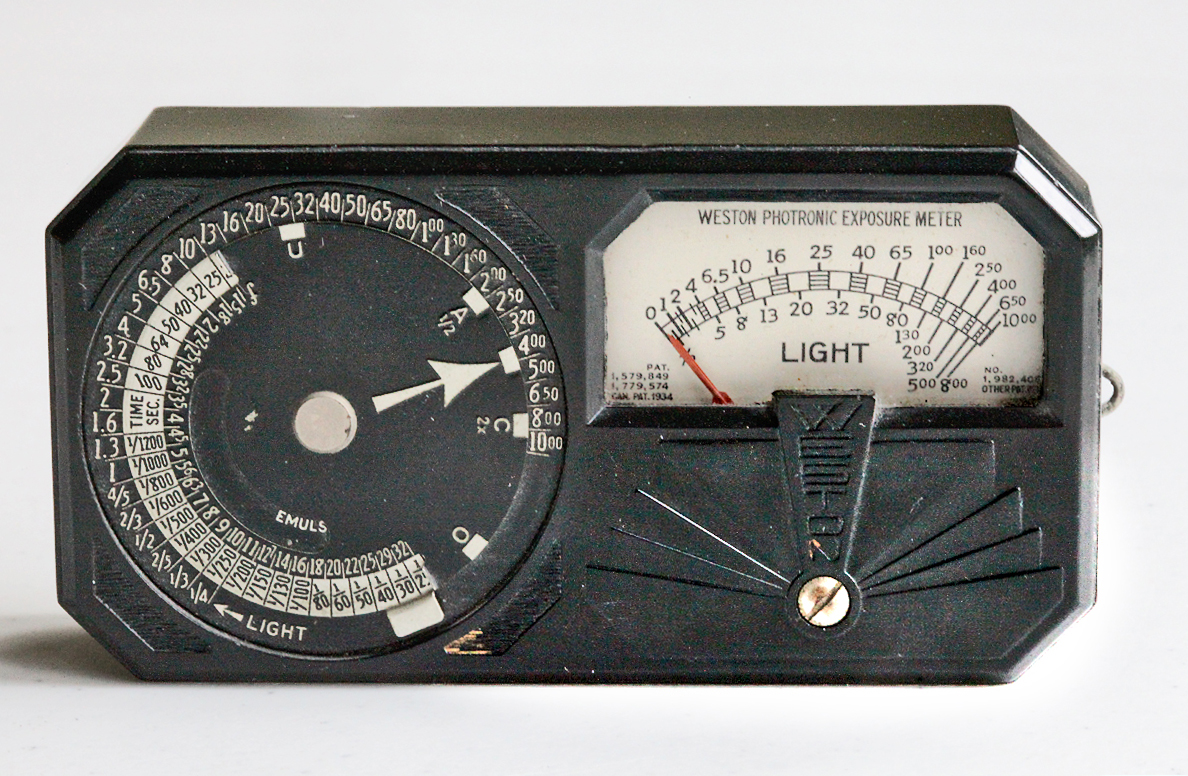
Weston Model 650 light meter from about 1935

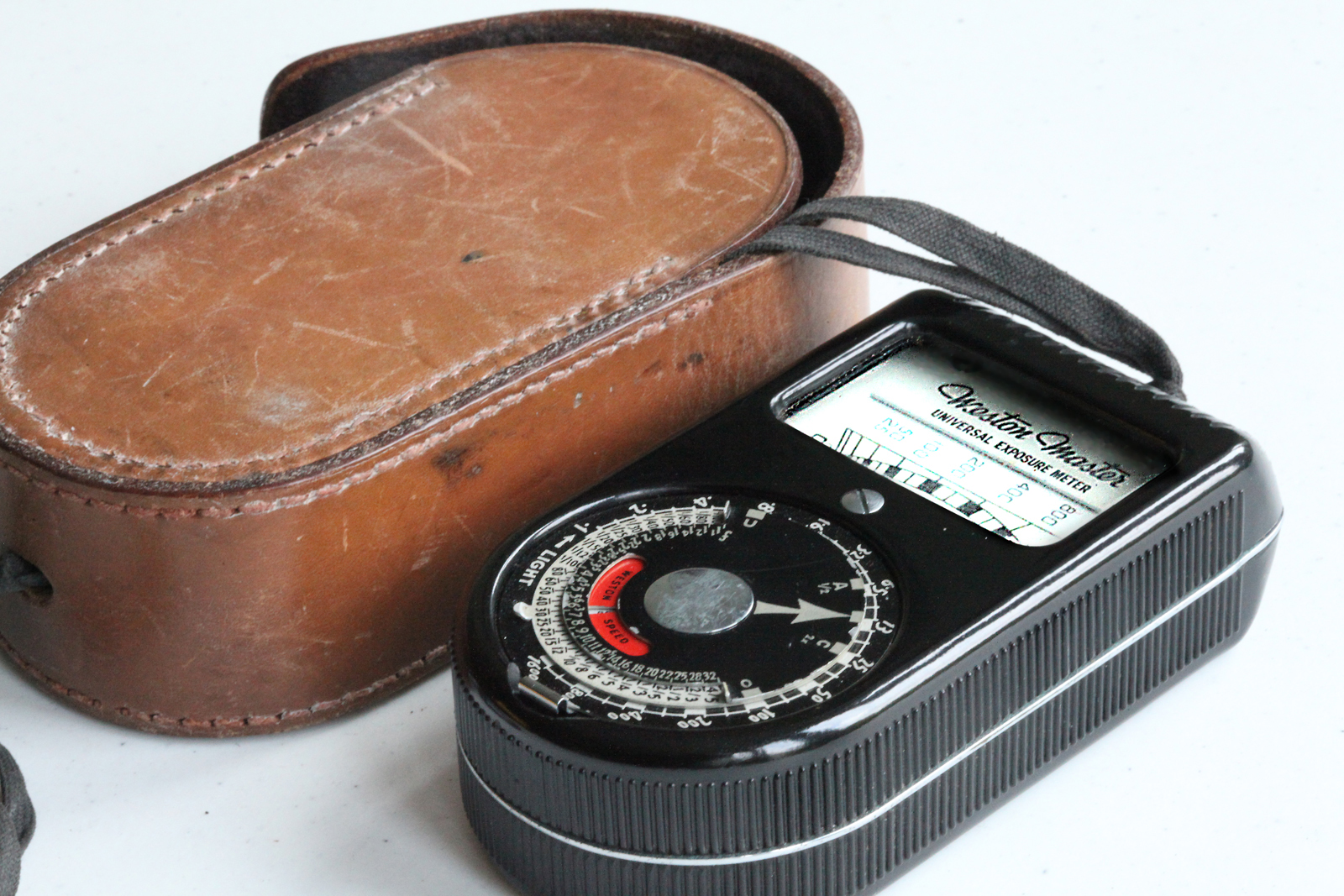
Early Weston Master light meter 1935–1945

Before the advent of the ASA system, the system of Weston film speed ratings was introduced by Edward Faraday Weston (1878–1971) and his father, Edward Weston (1850–1936), a British-born electrical engineer, industrialist and founder of the US-based Weston Electrical Instrument Corporation, with the Weston model 617, one of the earliest photo-electric exposure meters, in August 1932. The meter and film rating system were invented by William Nelson Goodwin, Jr., who worked for them and later received a Howard N. Potts Medal for his contributions to engineering.

The company tested and frequently published speed ratings for most films of the time. Weston film speed ratings could since be found on most Weston exposure meters and were sometimes referred to by film manufacturers and third parties in their exposure guidelines. Since manufacturers were sometimes creative about film speeds, the company went as far as to warn users about unauthorized uses of their film ratings in their "Weston film ratings" booklets.

The Weston Cadet (model 852 introduced in 1949), Direct Reading (model 853 introduced in 1954) and Master III (models 737 and S141.3 introduced in 1956) were the first in their line of exposure meters to switch and utilize the meanwhile established ASA scale instead. Other models used the original Weston scale up until ca. 1955. The company continued to publish Weston film ratings after 1955, but while their recommended values often differed slightly from the ASA film speeds found on film boxes, these newer Weston values were based on the ASA system and had to be converted for use with older Weston meters by subtracting 1/3 exposure stop as per Weston's recommendation. Vice versa, "old" Weston film speed ratings could be converted into "new" Westons and the ASA scale by adding the same amount, that is, a film rating of 100 Weston (up to 1955) corresponded with 125 ASA (as per ASA PH2.5-1954 and before). This conversion was not necessary on Weston meters manufactured and Weston film ratings published since 1956 due to their inherent use of the ASA system; however, the changes of the ASA PH2.5-1960 revision may be taken into account when comparing with newer ASA or ISO values.

==== General Electric ====
Prior to the establishment of the ASA scale and similar to Weston film speed ratings another manufacturer of photo-electric exposure meters, General Electric, developed its own rating system of so-called General Electric film values (often abbreviated as G-E or GE) around 1937.

Film speed values for use with their meters were published in regularly updated General Electric Film Values leaflets and in the General Electric Photo Data Book.

General Electric switched to use the ASA scale in 1946. Meters manufactured since February 1946 are equipped with the ASA scale (labeled "Exposure Index") already. For some of the older meters with scales in "Film Speed" or "Film Value" (e.g. models DW-48, DW-49 as well as early DW-58 and GW-68 variants), replaceable hoods with ASA scales were available from the manufacturer. The company continued to publish recommended film values after that date, however, they were then aligned to the ASA scale.

==== ASA ====
Based on earlier research work by Loyd Ancile Jones (1884–1954) of Kodak and inspired by the systems of Weston film speed ratings and General Electric film values, the American Standards Association (now named ANSI) defined a new method to determine and specify film speeds of black-and-white negative films in 1943. ASA Z38.2.1–1943 was revised in 1946 and 1947 before the standard grew into ASA PH2.5-1954. Originally, ASA values were frequently referred to as American standard speed numbers or ASA exposure-index numbers. (See also: Exposure Index (EI).)

The ASA scale is a linear scale, that is, a film denoted as having a film speed of 200 ASA is twice as fast as a film with 100 ASA.

The ASA standard underwent a major revision in 1960 with ASA PH2.5-1960, when the method to determine film speed was refined and previously applied safety factors against under-exposure were abandoned, effectively doubling the nominal speed of many black-and-white negative films. For example, an Ilford HP3 that had been rated at 200 ASA before 1960 was labeled 400 ASA afterwards without any change to the emulsion. Similar changes were applied to the DIN system with DIN 4512:1961-10 and the BS system with BS 1380:1963 in the following years.

In addition to the established arithmetic speed scale, ASA PH2.5-1960 also introduced logarithmic ASA grades (100 ASA = 5° ASA), where a difference of 1° ASA represented a full exposure stop and therefore the doubling of a film speed. For some while, ASA grades were also printed on film boxes, and they saw life in the form of the APEX speed value S_{v} (without degree symbol) as well.

ASA PH2.5-1960 was revised as ANSI PH2.5-1979, without the logarithmic speeds, and later replaced by NAPM IT2.5–1986 of the National Association of Photographic Manufacturers, which represented the US adoption of the international standard ISO 6. The latest issue of ANSI/NAPM IT2.5 was published in 1993.

The standard for color negative film was introduced as ASA PH2.27-1965 and saw a string of revisions in 1971, 1976, 1979, and 1981, before it finally became ANSI IT2.27–1988 prior to its withdrawal.

Color reversal film speeds were defined in ANSI PH2.21-1983, which was revised in 1989 before it became ANSI/NAPM IT2.21 in 1994, the US adoption of the ISO 2240 standard.

On an international level, the ASA system was superseded by the ISO film speed system between 1982 and 1987, however, the arithmetic ASA speed scale continued to live on as the linear speed value of the ISO system.

==== GOST ====
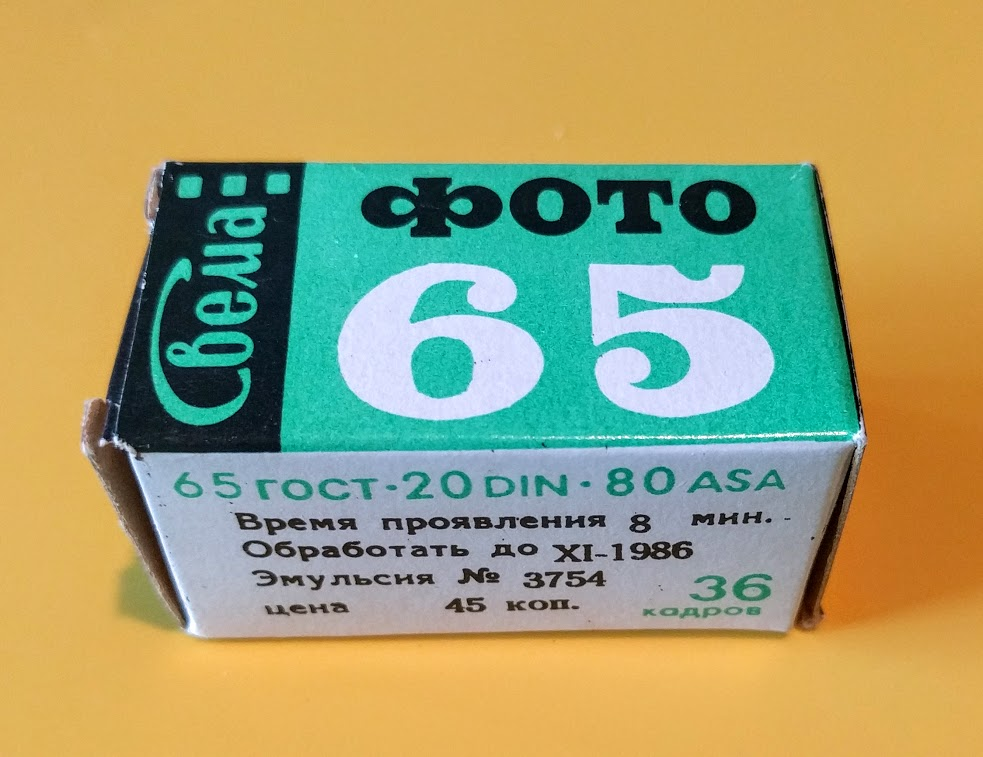
A box of Svema film, with a sensitivity of 65 GOST (ГОСТ)

GOST (Cyrillic: ГОСТ) was an arithmetic film speed scale defined in GOST 2817-45 and GOST 2817–50. It was used in the former Soviet Union from October 1951, replacing Hurter & Driffield (H&D, Cyrillic: ХиД) numbers, which had been used since 1928.

GOST 2817-50 was similar to the ASA standard, having been based on a speed point at a density 0.2 above base plus fog, as opposed to the ASA's 0.1. GOST markings are only found on pre-1987 photographic equipment (film, cameras, lightmeters, etc.) of Soviet Union manufacture.

On 1 January 1987, the GOST scale was realigned to the ISO scale with GOST 10691–84,

This evolved into multiple parts including GOST 10691.6–88 and GOST 10691.5–88, which both became functional on 1 January 1991.

=== Current system: ISO ===
The ASA and DIN film speed standards have been combined into the ISO standards since 1974.

The current International Standard for measuring the speed of color negative film is ISO 5800:2001 (first published in 1979, revised in November 1987) from the International Organization for Standardization (ISO). Related standards ISO 6:1993 (first published in 1974) and ISO 2240:2003 (first published in July 1982, revised in September 1994 and corrected in October 2003) define scales for speeds of black-and-white negative film and color reversal film, respectively.

The determination of ISO speeds with digital still-cameras is described in ISO 12232:2019 (first published in August 1998, revised in April 2006, corrected in October 2006 and again revised in February 2019).

The ISO system defines both an arithmetic and a logarithmic scale. The arithmetic ISO scale corresponds to the arithmetic ASA system, where a doubling of film sensitivity is represented by a doubling of the numerical film speed value. In the logarithmic ISO scale, which corresponds to the DIN scale, adding 3° to the numerical value constitutes a doubling of sensitivity. For example, a film rated ISO 200/24° is twice as sensitive as one rated ISO 100/21°.

Commonly, the logarithmic speed is omitted; for example, "ISO 100" denotes "ISO 100/21°", while logarithmic ISO speeds are written as "ISO 21°" as per the standard.

=== Conversion between current scales ===
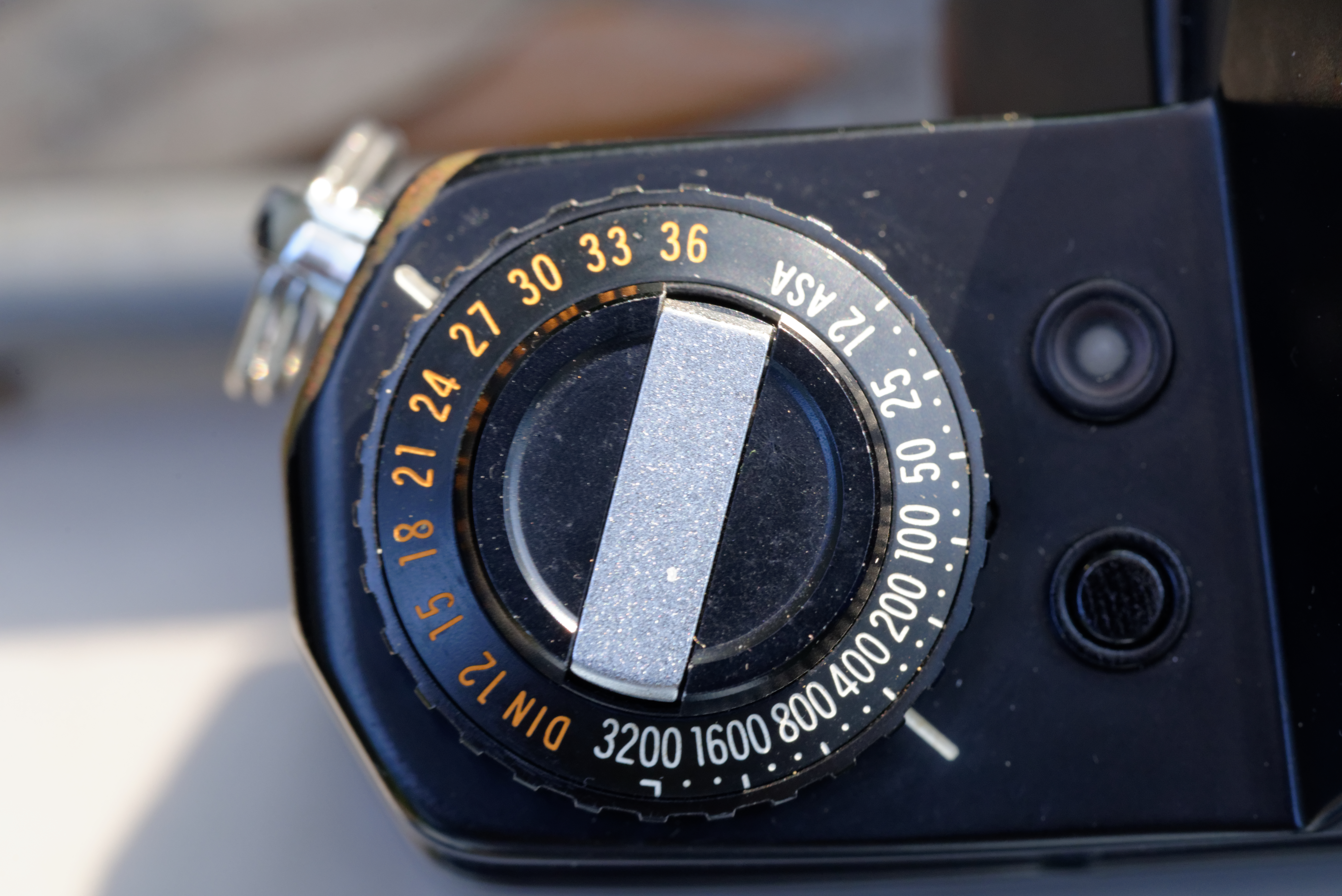
A Yashica FR with both ASA and DIN markings

Conversion from arithmetic speed S to logarithmic speed S° is given by

$$S^\circ = 10 \log S + 1$$

and rounding to the nearest integer; the log is base 10. Conversion from logarithmic speed to arithmetic speed is given by

$$S = 10^{\left( {S^\circ - 1} \right)/10}$$

and rounding to the nearest standard arithmetic speed in Table 1 below.

Table1. Comparison of various film speed scales
| APEX S_{v} | ISO arith/log° | Camera mfrs. | ASA arith | DIN log | GOST arith | Example of film stock with this nominal speed |
|---|---|---|---|---|---|---|
| −2 | 0.8/0° | | 0.8 | 0 | | FPPBW Super Positive |
| | 1/1° | | 1 | 1 | (1) | Svema Micrat-orto, Astrum Micrat-orto |
| | 1.2/2° | | 1.2 | 2 | (1) | |
| −1 | 1.6/3° | | 1.6 | 3 | 1.4 | |
| | 2/4° | | 2 | 4 | (2) | |
| | 2.5/5° | | 2.5 | 5 | (2) | |
| 0 | 3/6° | | 3 | 6 | 2.8 | Svema MZ-3, Astrum MZ-3 |
| | **4/7°** | | **4** | 7 | (4) | |
| | **5/8°** | | **5** | 8 | (4) | Original three-strip Technicolor |
| **1** | **6/9°** | | **6** | 9 | 5.5 | Original Kodachrome |
| | **8/10°** | | **8** | 10 | (8) | Polaroid PolaBlue |
| | **10/11°** | | **10** | 11 | (8) | Kodachrome 8mm film |
| **2** | **12/12°** | | **12** | 12 | 11 | Gevacolor 8mm reversal film, later Agfa Dia-Direct |
| | **16/13°** | | **16** | 13 | (16) | Agfacolor 8mm reversal film |
| | **20/14°** | | **20** | 14 | (16) | Adox CMS 20 |
| **3** | **25/15°** | | **25** | 15 | 22 | Old Agfacolor, KodachromeII and (later) Kodachrome 25, Efke 25 |
| | **32/16°** | | **32** | 16 | (32) | Kodak Panatomic-X |
| | **40/17°** | | **40** | 17 | (32) | Kodachrome 40 (movie) |
| **4** | **50/18°** | | **50** | 18 | 45 | Fuji RVP (Velvia), Ilford Pan F Plus, Kodak Vision 250D 5201 (movie), AGFA CT18, Efke 50, Polaroid type 55 |
| | **64/19°** | | **64** | 19 | (65) | Kodachrome 64, Ektachrome-X, Polaroid type 64T |
| | **80/20°** | | **80** | 20 | (65) | Ilford Commercial Ortho, Polaroid type669 |
| **5** | **100/21°** | | **100** | 21 | 90 | Kodak T-MAX 100 (TMX), Kodak Ektar, Fujichrome Provia 100F, Fujifilm Acros 100 II Efke 100, Fomapan/Arista 100, Kentmere Pan 100 |
| | **125/22°** | | **125** | 22 | (130) | Ilford FP4+, Kodak Plus-X Pan, Svema Color 125 |
| | **160/23°** | | **160** | 23 | (130) | Fujicolor Pro 160C/S, Kodak High-Speed Ektachrome, Kodak Portra 160NC and 160VC |
| **6** | **200/24°** | | **200** | 24 | 180 | Kodak Gold 200, Fujicolor Superia 200, Agfa Scala 200x, Fomapan/Arista 200, Wittner Chrome 200D, Agfa Aviphot Chrome 200 PE1 |
| | **250/25°** | | **250** | 25 | (250) | Tasma Foto-250, Eastman Double-X |
| | **320/26°** | | **320** | 26 | (250) | Kodak Tri-X Pan Professional (TXP) |
| **7** | **400/27°** | | **400** | 27 | 350 | Kodak T-Max400 (TMY), Kodak Tri-X 400, Kodak Portra 400, Ilford HP5+, Fujifilm Superia X-tra 400, Fujichrome Provia 400X, Fomapan/Arista 400, KentmerePan 400 |
| | **500/28°** | | **500** | 28 | (500) | Kodak Vision3500T5219 (movie) |
| | **640/29°** | | **640** | 29 | (500) | Polaroid600 |
| **8** | **800/30°** | | **800** | 30 | 700 | Fuji Pro 800Z, Fuji Instax |
| | **1000/31°** | | **1000** | 31 | (1000) | Ilford Delta 3200, Kodak P3200 TMAX; Kodak Professional T-Max P3200 (see Marketing anomalies below) |
| | **1250/32°** | | **1250** | 32 | (1000) | Kodak Royal-X Panchromatic |
| **9** | **1600/33°** | | **1600** | 33 | 1400 (1440) | Fujicolor 1600, Fuji Natura 1600 and Superia 1600, Neopan 1600 |
| | **2000/34°** | | **2000** | 34 | (2000) | |
| | **2500/35°** | | **2500** | 35 | (2000) | |
| **10** | **3200/36°** | | **3200** | 36 | 2800 (2880) | Konica 3200, Polaroid type 667, Fujifilm FP-3000B, Kodak Tmax 3200 B&W |
| | **4000/37°** | | | 37 | (4000) | |
| | **5000/38°** | | | 38 | (4000) | |
| 11 | **6400/39°** | | 6400 | 39 | 5600 | |
| | **8000/40°** | | | | | |
| | **10000/41°** | | | | | |
| 12 | 12500/42° | 12800 | 12500 | | | ISO speeds greater than 10000 have not been defined officially before ISO12232:2019. |
| | 16000/43° | | | | | |
| | 20000/44° | | | | | Polaroid type 612 |
| 13 | 25000/45° | 25600 | | | | |
| | 32000/46° | | | | | |
| | 40000/47° | | | | | |
| 14 | 50000/48° | 51200 | | | | |
| | 64000/49° | | | | | |
| | 80000/50° | | | | | |
| 15 | 100000/51° | 102400 | | 51 | | Nikon D3s and Canon EOS-1D Mark IV (2009) |
| | 125000/52° | | | | | |
| | 160000/53° | | | | | |
| 16 | 200000/54° | 204800 | | | | Canon EOS-1D X (2011), Nikon D4 (2012), Pentax 645Z (2014) |
| | 250000/55° | | | | | |
| | 320000/56° | | | | | |
| 17 | 400000/57° | 409600 | | | | Nikon D4s, Sony α ILCE-7S (2014), Canon EOS 1D X Mark II (2016) |
| | 500000/58° | | | | | |
| | 640000/59° | | | | | |
| 18 | 800000/60° | | | | | |
| | 1000000/61° | | | | | |
| | 1250000/62° | | | | | |
| 19 | 1600000/63° | | | | | |
| | 2000000/64° | | | | | |
| | 2500000/65° | | | | | |
| 20 | 3200000/66° | 3280000 | | | | Nikon D5 (2016) |
| | 4000000/67° | 4560000 | | | | Canon ME20F-SH (2015) |

Table notes:

1. Speeds shown in bold under APEX, ISO, and ASA are values actually assigned in speed standards from the respective agencies; other values are calculated extensions to assigned speeds using the same progressions as for the assigned speeds.
2. APEX S_{v} values 1 to 10 correspond with logarithmic ASA grades 1° to 10° found in ASA PH2.5-1960.
3. ASA arithmetic speeds from 4 to 5 are taken from ANSI PH2.21-1979 (Table 1, p. 8).
4. ASA arithmetic speeds from 6 to 3200 are taken from ANSI PH2.5-1979 (Table 1, p. 5) and ANSI PH2.27-1979.
5. ISO arithmetic speeds from 4 to 3200 are taken from ISO 5800:1987 (Table "ISO speed scales", p. 4).
6. ISO arithmetic speeds from 6 to 10000 are taken from ISO 12232:1998 (Table 1, p. 9).
7. ISO 12232:1998 does not specify speeds greater than 10000. However, the upper limit for S_{noise} 10000 was given as 12500, suggesting that ISO may have envisioned a progression of 12500, 25000, 50000, and 100000, similar to that from 1250 to 10000. This was consistent with ASA PH2.12-1961. For digital cameras, Nikon, Canon, Sony, Pentax, and Fujifilm chose to express the greater speeds in an exact power-of-2 progression from the highest previously realized speed (6400) rather than rounding to an extension of the existing progression. Speed ratings greater than 10000 have finally been defined in ISO 12232:2019.
8. Most of the modern 35 mm film SLRs support an automatic film speed range from ISO 25/15° to 5000/38° with DX-coded films, or ISO 6/9° to 6400/39° manually (without utilizing exposure compensation). The film speed range with support for TTL flash is smaller, typically ISO 12/12° to 3200/36° or less.
9. The Booster accessory for the Canon Pellix QL (1965) and Canon FT QL (1966) supported film speeds from 25 to 12800 ASA.
10. The film speed dial of the Canon A-1 (1978) supported a speed range from 6 to 12800 ASA (but already called ISO film speeds in the manual). On this camera exposure compensation and extreme film speeds were mutually exclusive.
11. The Leica R8 (1996) and R9 (2002) officially supported film speeds of 8000/40°, 10000/41° and 12800/42° (in the case of the R8) or 12500/42° (in the case of the R9), and utilizing its ±3 EV exposure compensation the range could be extended from ISO 0.8/0° to ISO 100000/51° in half exposure steps.
12. Digital camera manufacturers' arithmetic speeds from 12800 to 409600 are from specifications by Nikon (12800, 25600, 51200, 102400 in 2009, 204800 in 2012, 409600 in 2014), Canon (12800, 25600, 51200, 102400 in 2009, 204800 in 2011, 4000000 in 2015), Sony (12800 in 2009, 25600 in 2010, 409600 in 2014), Pentax (12800, 25600, 51200 in 2010, 102400, 204800 in 2014), and Fujifilm (12800 in 2011).

=== Historical ASA and DIN conversion ===
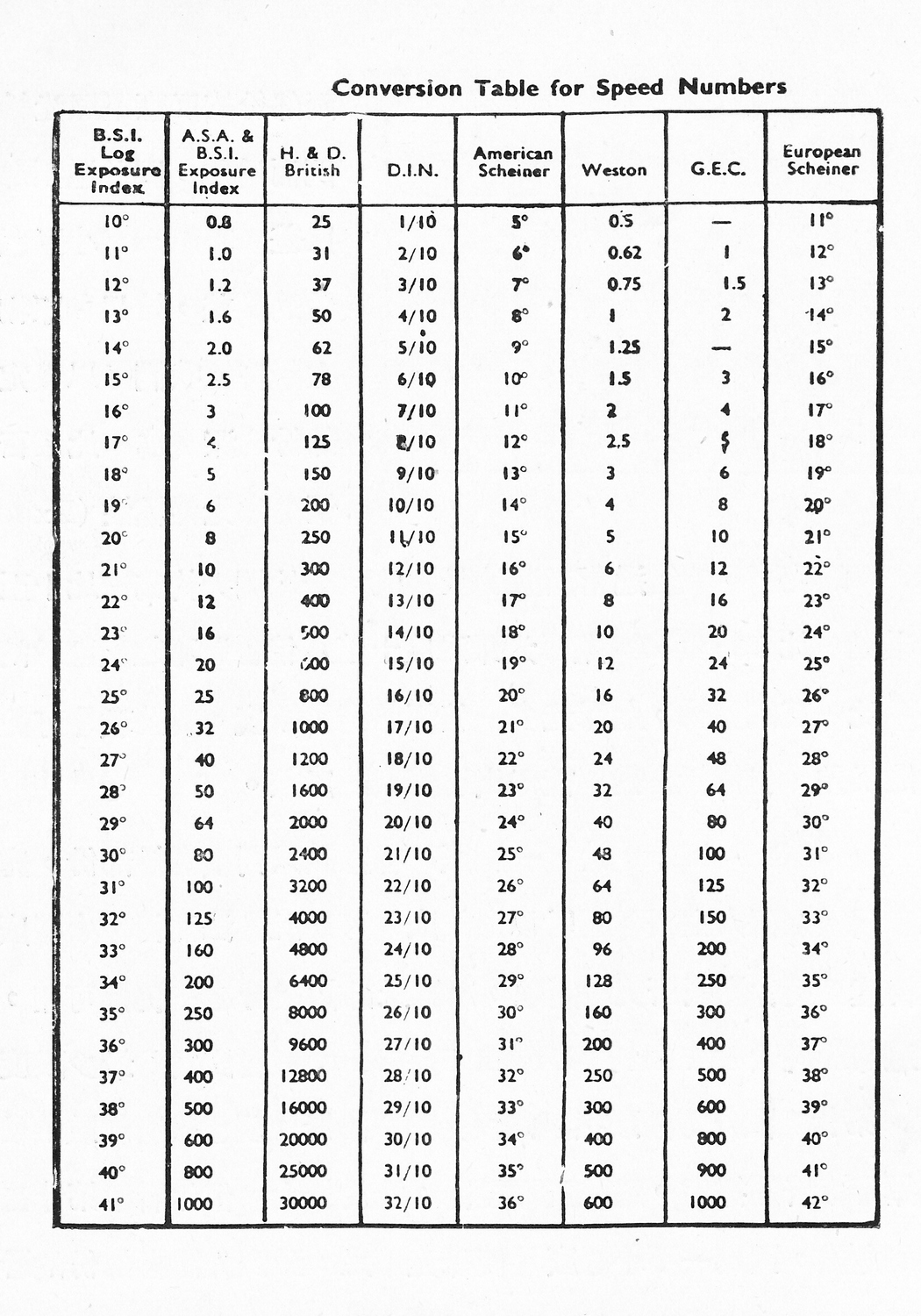
Historical film speed conversion table, 1952

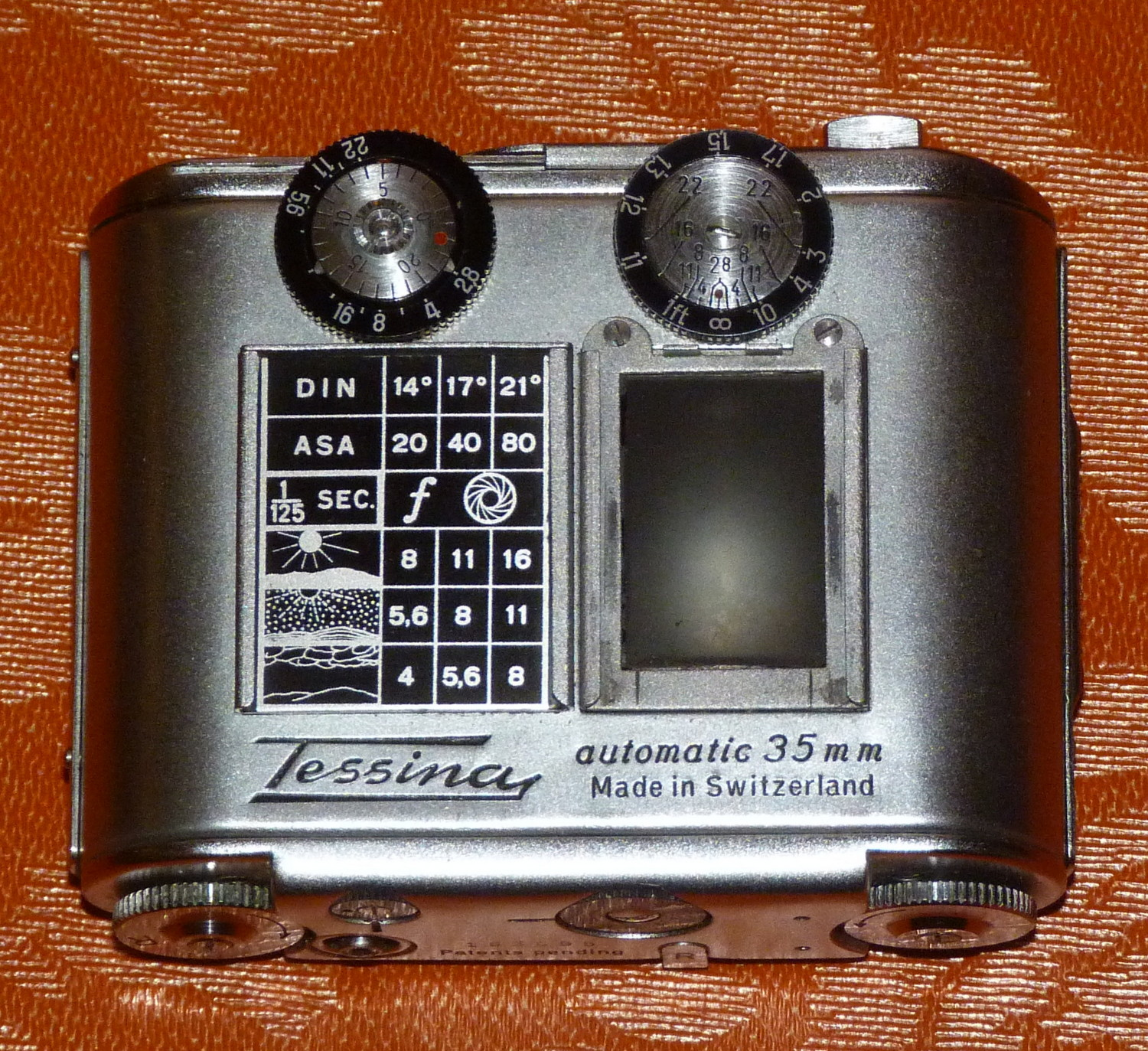
Classic camera Tessina with exposure guide, late 1950s

As discussed in the ASA and DIN sections, the definition of the ASA and DIN scales changed several times in the 1950s up into the early 1960s making it necessary to convert between the different scales. Since the ISO system combines the newer ASA and DIN definitions, this conversion is also necessary when comparing older ASA and DIN scales with the ISO scale.

The picture shows an ASA/DIN conversion in a 1952 photography book in which 21/10° DIN was converted to ASA 80 instead of ASA 100.

Some classic camera's exposure guides show the old conversion as they were valid at the time of production, for example the exposure guide of the classic camera Tessina (since 1957), where 21/10° DIN is related to ASA 80, 18° DIN to ASA 40, etc. Users of classic cameras may become confused if they are not aware of the historical background of changing standards.

=== Determining film speed ===
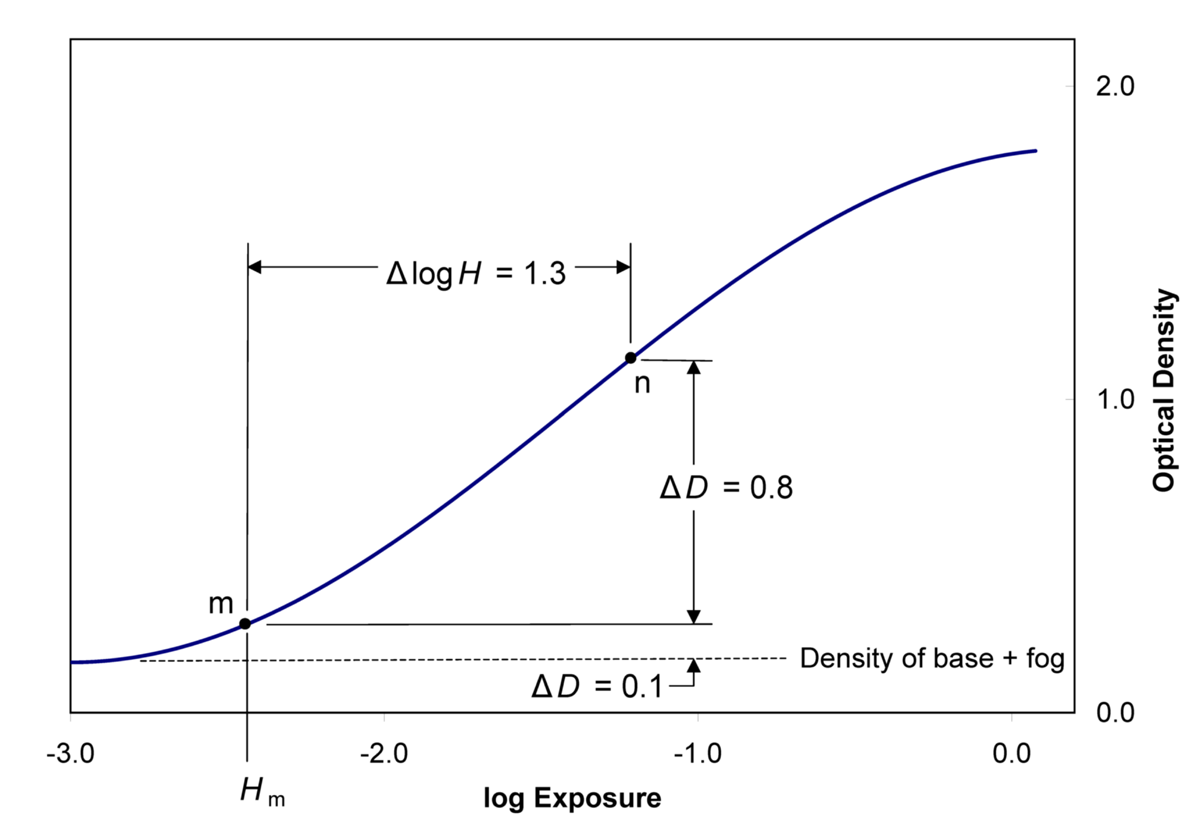
ISO 6:1993 method of determining speed for black-and-white film

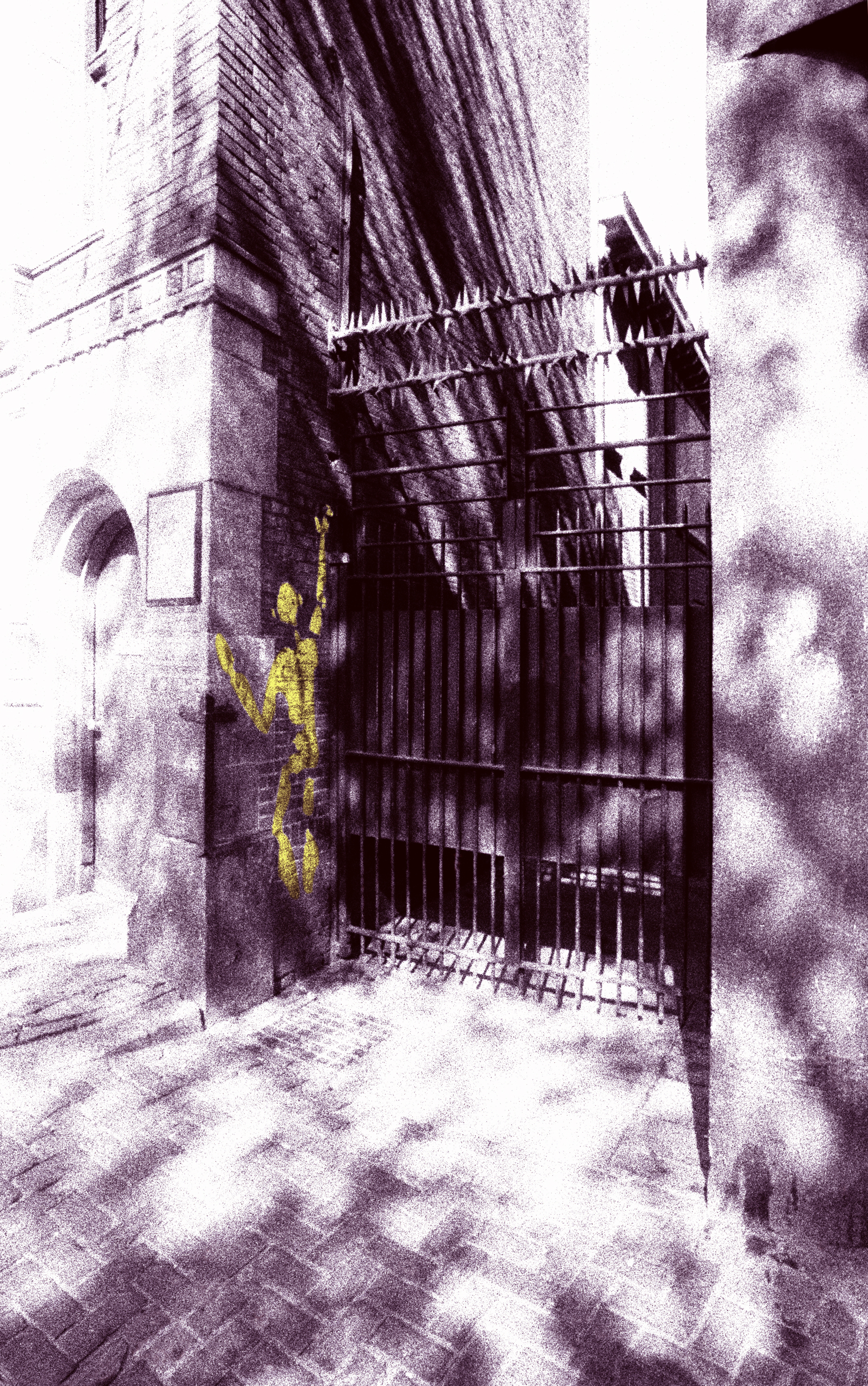
Recording film 1000 ASA, Red Light District, Amsterdam, Graffiti 1996

Film speed is found from a plot of optical density vs. log of exposure for the film, known as the D–log H curve or Hurter–Driffield curve. There typically are five regions in the curve: the base + fog, the toe, the linear region, the shoulder, and the overexposed region. For black-and-white negative film, the "speed point" m is the point on the curve where density exceeds the base + fog density by 0.1 when the negative is developed so that a point n where the log of exposure is 1.3 units greater than the exposure at point m has a density 0.8 greater than the density at point m. The exposure H_{m}, in lux-s, is that for point m when the specified contrast condition is satisfied. The ISO arithmetic speed is determined from:

$$S = \frac {0.8\;\text{lx⋅s}} {H_\mathrm{m}}$$

This value is then rounded to the nearest standard speed in Table 1 of ISO 6:1993.

Determining speed for color negative film is similar in concept but more complex because it involves separate curves for blue, green, and red. The film is processed according to the film manufacturer's recommendations rather than to a specified contrast. ISO speed for color reversal film is determined from the middle rather than the threshold of the curve; it again involves separate curves for blue, green, and red, and the film is processed according to the film manufacturer's recommendations.

=== Applying film speed ===
Film speed is used in the exposure equations to find the appropriate exposure parameters. Four variables are available to the photographer to obtain the desired effect: lighting, film speed, f-number (aperture size), and shutter speed (exposure time). The equation may be expressed as ratios, or, by taking the logarithm (base 2) of both sides, by addition, using the APEX system, in which every increment of 1 is a doubling of exposure; this increment is commonly known as a "stop". The effective f-number is proportional to the ratio between the lens focal length and aperture diameter, the diameter itself being proportional to the square root of the aperture area. Thus, a lens set to f/1.4 allows twice as much light to strike the focal plane as a lens set to f/2. Therefore, each f-number factor of the square root of two (approximately 1.4) is also a stop, so lenses are typically marked in that progression: f/1.4, 2, 2.8, 4, 5.6, 8, 11, 16, 22, 32, etc..

The ISO arithmetic speed has a useful property for photographers without the equipment for taking a metered light reading. Correct exposure will usually be achieved for a frontlighted scene in bright sun if the aperture of the lens is set to f/16 and the shutter speed is the reciprocal of the ISO film speed (e.g. 1/100 second for 100 ISO film). This is known as the sunny 16 rule.

=== Exposure index ===
Exposure index, or EI, refers to speed rating assigned to a particular film and shooting situation in variance to the film's actual speed. It is used to compensate for equipment calibration inaccuracies or process variables, or to achieve certain effects. The exposure index may simply be called the speed setting, as compared to the speed rating.

For example, a photographer may rate an ISO 400 film at EI 800 and then use push processing to obtain printable negatives in low-light conditions. The film has been exposed at EI 800.

Another example occurs where a camera's shutter is miscalibrated and consistently overexposes or underexposes the film; similarly, a light meter may be inaccurate. One may adjust the EI setting accordingly in order to compensate for these defects and consistently produce correctly exposed negatives.

== Reciprocity ==
Upon exposure, the amount of light energy that reaches the film determines the effect upon the emulsion. If the brightness of the light is multiplied by a factor and the exposure of the film decreased by the same factor by varying the camera's shutter speed and aperture, so that the energy received is the same, the film will be developed to the same density. This rule is called reciprocity. The systems for determining the sensitivity for an emulsion are possible because reciprocity holds over a wide range of customary conditions. In practice, reciprocity works reasonably well for normal photographic films for the range of exposures between 1/1000 second to 1/2 second. However, this relationship breaks down outside these limits, a phenomenon known as reciprocity failure.

== Film sensitivity and grain ==
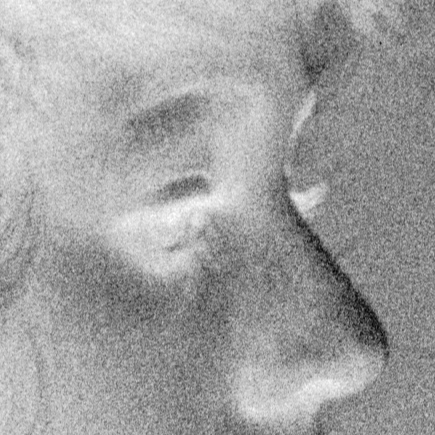
Grainy high-speed B&W film negative

The size of silver halide grains in the emulsion affects film sensitivity, which is related to granularity because larger grains give film greater sensitivity to light. Fine-grain film, such as film designed for portraiture or copying original camera negatives, is relatively insensitive, or "slow", because it requires brighter light or a longer exposure than a "fast" film. Fast films, used for photographing in low light or capturing high-speed motion, produce comparatively grainy images.

Kodak has defined a "Print Grain Index" (PGI) to characterize film grain (color negative films only), based on perceptual just-noticeable difference of graininess in prints. They also define "granularity", a measurement of grain using an RMS measurement of density fluctuations in uniformly exposed film, measured with a microdensitometer with 48 micrometre aperture. Granularity varies with exposure — underexposed film looks grainier than overexposed film.

=== Marketing anomalies ===
Some high-speed black-and-white films, such as Ilford Delta 3200 and P3200 T-Max are marketed with film speeds in excess of their true ISO speed as determined using the ISO testing method. According to the respective data sheets, the Ilford product is actually an ISO 1000 film, while the Kodak film's speed is nominally 800 to 1000 ISO. The manufacturers do not indicate that the 3200 number is an ISO rating on their packaging. Kodak and Fuji also marketed E6 films designed for pushing (hence the "P" prefix), such as Ektachrome P800/1600 and Fujichrome P1600, both with a base speed of ISO 400. The DX codes on the film cartridges indicate the marketed film speed (i.e. 3200), not the ISO speed, in order to automate shooting and development.

== Digital camera ISO speed and exposure index ==
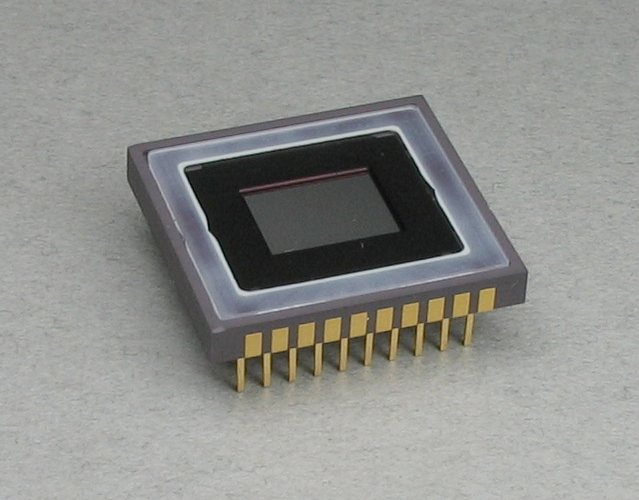
A CCD image sensor, 2/3 inch size

In digital camera systems, an arbitrary relationship between exposure and sensor data values can be achieved by setting the signal gain of the sensor. The relationship between the sensor data values and the lightness of the finished image is also arbitrary, depending on the parameters chosen for the interpretation of the sensor data into an image color space such as sRGB.

For digital photo cameras ("digital still cameras"), an exposure index (EI) rating—commonly called ISO setting—is specified by the manufacturer such that the sRGB image files produced by the camera will have a lightness similar to what would be obtained with film of the same EI rating at the same exposure. The usual design is that the camera's parameters for interpreting the sensor data values into sRGB values are fixed, and a number of different EI choices are accommodated by varying the sensor's signal gain in the analog realm, prior to conversion to digital. Some camera designs provide at least some EI choices by adjusting the sensor's signal gain in the digital realm ("expanded ISO"). A few camera designs also provide EI adjustment through a choice of lightness parameters for the interpretation of sensor data values into sRGB; this variation allows different tradeoffs between the range of highlights that can be captured and the amount of noise introduced into the shadow areas of the photo.

Digital cameras have far surpassed film in terms of sensitivity to light, with ISO equivalent speeds of up to 4,560,000, a number that is unfathomable in the realm of conventional film photography. Faster microprocessors, as well as advances in software noise reduction techniques allow this type of processing to be executed the moment the photo is captured, allowing photographers to store images that have a higher level of refinement and would have been prohibitively time-consuming to process with earlier generations of digital camera hardware.

=== The ISO (International Organization of Standards) 12232:2019 standard ===
The ISO standard ISO 12232:2006 gave digital still camera manufacturers a choice of five different techniques for determining the exposure index rating at each sensitivity setting provided by a particular camera model. Three of the techniques in ISO 12232:2006 were carried over from the 1998 version of the standard, while two new techniques allowing for measurement of JPEG output files were introduced from CIPA DC-004. Depending on the technique selected, the exposure index rating could depend on the sensor sensitivity, the sensor noise, and the appearance of the resulting image. The standard specified the measurement of light sensitivity of the entire digital camera system and not of individual components such as digital sensors, although Kodak has reported using a variation to characterize the sensitivity of two of their sensors in 2001.

The Recommended Exposure Index (REI) technique, new in the 2006 version of the standard, allows the manufacturer to specify a camera model's EI choices arbitrarily. The choices are based solely on the manufacturer's opinion of what EI values produce well-exposed sRGB images at the various sensor sensitivity settings. This is the only technique available under the standard for output formats that are not in the sRGB color space. This is also the only technique available under the standard when multi-zone metering (also called pattern metering) is used.

The Standard Output Sensitivity (SOS) technique, also new in the 2006 version of the standard, effectively specifies that the average level in the sRGB image must be 18% gray plus or minus 1/3 stop when the exposure is controlled by an automatic exposure control system calibrated per ISO 2721 and set to the EI with no exposure compensation. Because the output level is measured in the sRGB output from the camera, it is only applicable to sRGB images—typically JPEG—and not to output files in raw image format. It is not applicable when multi-zone metering is used.

The CIPA DC-004 standard requires that Japanese manufacturers of digital still cameras use either the REI or SOS techniques, and DC-008 updates the Exif specification to differentiate between these values. Consequently, the three EI techniques carried over from ISO 12232:1998 are not widely used in recent camera models (approximately 2007 and later). As those earlier techniques did not allow for measurement from images produced with lossy compression, they cannot be used at all on cameras that produce images only in JPEG format.

The saturation-based (SAT or S_{sat}) technique is closely related to the SOS technique, with the sRGB output level being measured at 100% white rather than 18% gray. The SOS value is effectively 0.704 times the saturation-based value. Because the output level is measured in the sRGB output from the camera, it is only applicable to sRGB images—typically TIFF—and not to output files in raw image format. It is not applicable when multi-zone metering is used.

The two noise-based techniques have rarely been used for consumer digital still cameras. These techniques specify the highest EI that can be used while still providing either an "excellent" picture or a "usable" picture depending on the technique chosen.

An update to this standard has been published as ISO 12232:2019, defining a wider range of ISO speeds.

=== Measurements and calculations ===
ISO speed ratings of a digital camera are based on the properties of the sensor and the image processing done in the camera, and are expressed in terms of the luminous exposure H (in lux seconds) arriving at the sensor. For a typical camera lens with an effective focal length f that is much smaller than the distance between the camera and the photographed scene, H is given by

$$H=\frac{qLt}{N^2}$$,

where L is the luminance of the scene (in candela per m²), t is the exposure time (in seconds), N is the aperture f-number, and

$$q=\frac{\pi}{4} T\,v(\theta)\,\cos^4\theta$$

is a factor depending on the transmittance T of the lens, the vignetting factor v(θ), and the angle θ relative to the axis of the lens. A typical value is q = 0.65, based on θ = 10°, T = 0.9, and v = 0.98.

==== Saturation-based speed ====
The saturation-based speed is defined as

$$S_{\mathrm{sat}}=\frac{78\;\text{lx⋅s}}{H_{\mathrm{sat}}}$$,

where $H_{\mathrm{sat}}$ is the maximum possible exposure that does not lead to a clipped or bloomed camera output. Typically, the lower limit of the saturation speed is determined by the sensor itself, but with the gain of the amplifier between the sensor and the analog-to-digital converter, the saturation speed can be increased. The factor 78 is chosen such that exposure settings based on a standard light meter and an 18-percent reflective surface will result in an image with a grey level of 18%/√2 = 12.7% of saturation. The factor √2 indicates that there is half a stop of headroom to deal with specular reflections that would appear brighter than a 100% reflecting diffuse white surface.

==== Noise-based speed ====
Digital noise at 3200 ISO vs. 100 ISO

The noise-based speed is defined as the exposure that will lead to a given signal-to-noise ratio on individual pixels. Two ratios are used, the 40:1 ("excellent image quality") and the 10:1 ("acceptable image quality") ratio. These ratios have been subjectively determined based on a resolution of 70 pixels per cm (178 DPI) when viewed at 25 cm (9.8 inch) distance. The noise is defined as the standard deviation of a weighted average of the luminance and color of individual pixels. The noise-based speed is mostly determined by the properties of the sensor and somewhat affected by the noise in the electronic gain and AD converter.

==== Standard output sensitivity (SOS) ====
In addition to the above speed ratings, the standard also defines the standard output sensitivity (SOS), how the exposure is related to the digital pixel values in the output image. It is defined as

$$S_{\mathrm{sos}} = \frac{10\;\text{lx⋅s}}{H_{\mathrm{sos}}},$$

where $H_{\mathrm{sos}}$ is the exposure that will lead to values of 118 in 8-bit pixels, which is 18 percent of the saturation value in images encoded as sRGB or with gamma = 2.2.

==== Discussion ====
The standard specifies how speed ratings should be reported by the camera. If the noise-based speed (40:1) is higher than the saturation-based speed, the noise-based speed should be reported, rounded downwards to a standard value (e.g. 200, 250, 320, or 400). The rationale is that exposure according to the lower saturation-based speed would not result in a visibly better image. In addition, an exposure latitude can be specified, ranging from the saturation-based speed to the 10:1 noise-based speed. If the noise-based speed (40:1) is lower than the saturation-based speed, or undefined because of high noise, the saturation-based speed is specified, rounded upwards to a standard value, because using the noise-based speed would lead to overexposed images. The camera may also report the SOS-based speed (explicitly as being an SOS speed), rounded to the nearest standard speed rating.

For example, a camera sensor may have the following properties: $S_{40:1}=107$, $S_{10:1}=1688$, and $S_{\mathrm{sat}}=49$. According to the standard, the camera should report its sensitivity as

ISO 100 (daylight)
ISO speed latitude 50–1600
ISO 100 (SOS, daylight).

The SOS rating could be user controlled. For a different camera with a noisier sensor, the properties might be $S_{40:1}=40$, $S_{10:1}=800$, and $S_{\mathrm{sat}}=200$. In this case, the camera should report

ISO 200 (daylight),

as well as a user-adjustable SOS value. In all cases, the camera should indicate for the white balance setting for which the speed rating applies, such as daylight or tungsten (incandescent light).

Despite these detailed standard definitions, cameras typically do not clearly indicate whether the user "ISO" setting refers to the noise-based speed, saturation-based speed, or the specified output sensitivity, or even some made-up number for marketing purposes. Because the 1998 version of ISO 12232 did not permit measurement of camera output that had lossy compression, it was not possible to correctly apply any of those measurements to cameras that did not produce sRGB files in an uncompressed format such as TIFF. Following the publication of CIPA DC-004 in 2006, Japanese manufacturers of digital still cameras are required to specify whether a sensitivity rating is REI or SOS.

A greater SOS setting for a given sensor comes with some loss of image quality, just like with analog film. However, this loss is visible as image noise rather than grain. APS- and 35 mm-sized digital image sensors, both CMOS and CCD based, do not produce significant noise until about ISO 1600.

== See also ==
- Frame rate
- Lens speed
- Preferred number
