= Julius Scheiner =

German astronomer

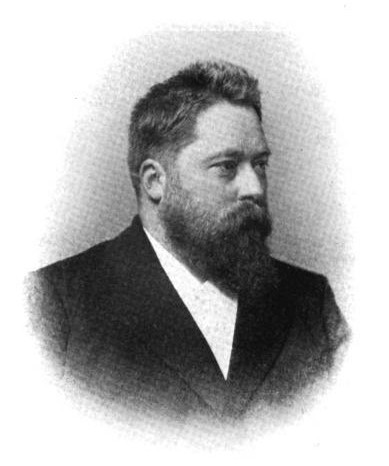
Julius Scheiner

Julius Scheiner (25 November 1858 – 20 December 1913) was a German astronomer, born in Cologne and educated at Bonn. He became assistant at the astrophysical observatory in Potsdam in 1887 and its observer in chief in 1898, three years after his appointment to the chair of astrophysics in the University of Berlin. Scheiner paid special attention to celestial photography and wrote Die Spektralanalyse der Gestirne (1890); Lehrbuch der Photographie der Gestirne (1897); Strahlung und Temperatur der Sonne (1899); Der Bau des Weltalls (1901); third edition (1909). In 1899 he began the publication of the Photographische Himmelskarte; Zone +31° bis +40° Deklination.

He is also credited with developing the first system for measuring the sensitivity of photographic emulsions in 1894, Scheinergrade, which also inspired the later DIN 4512 standard to measure film speeds.
