= Henry Deacon (industrialist) =

British chemist and businessman

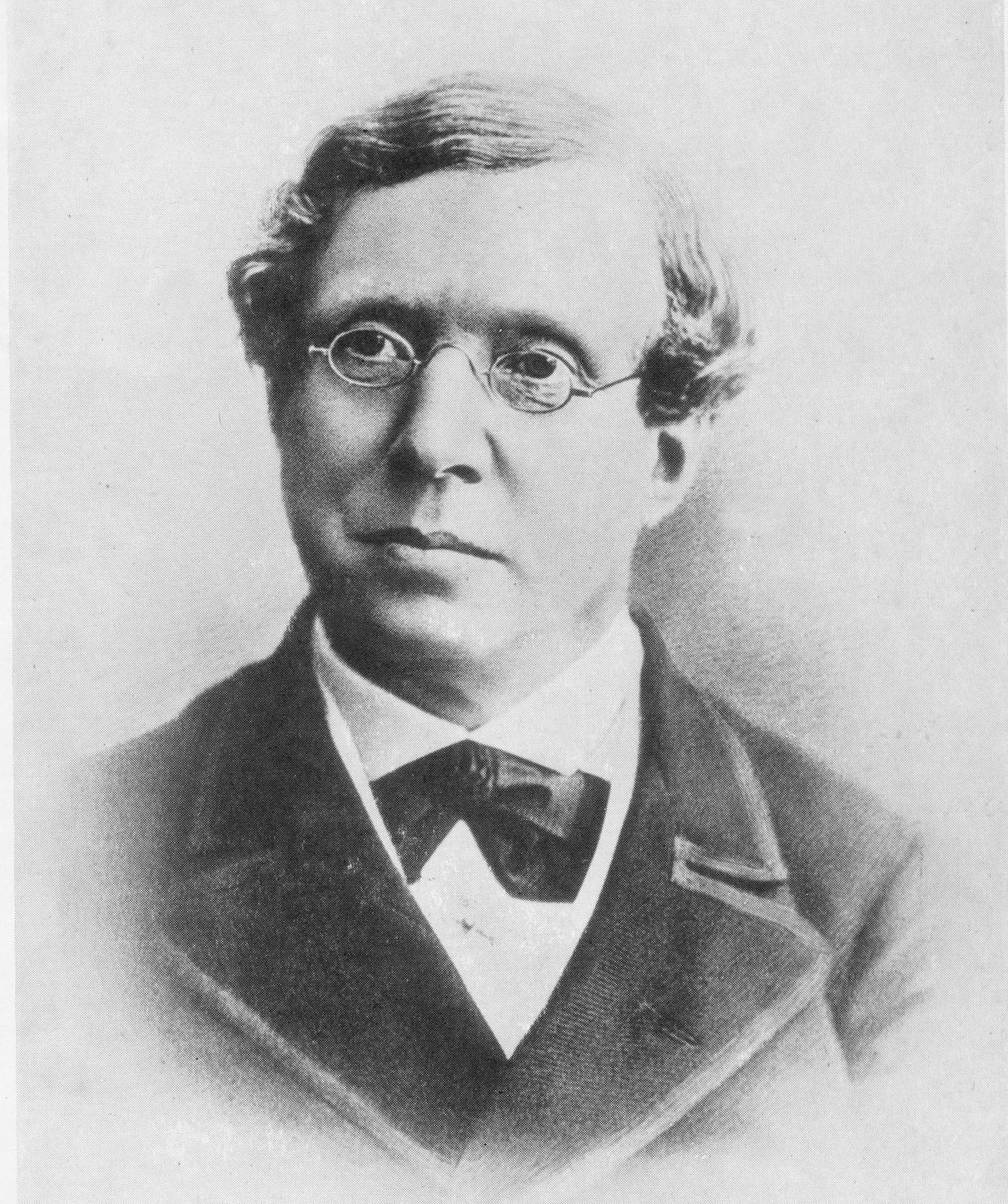
- Henry Deacon
- Born: 30 July 1822; London, England
- Died: 23 July 1876 (aged 53); Widnes, Lancashire
- Known for: Manufacture of alkali and chlorine
- Scientific career
- Fields: Chemist, engineer
- Workplaces: Nasmyth, Gaskell and Company; Pilkington Brothers; Gaskell, Deacon and Co

Henry Deacon (30 July 1822 – 23 July 1876) was a chemist and industrialist who established a chemical factory in Widnes, Lancashire, England.

Henry Deacon's father was also named Henry Deacon and his mother was Esther Deacon, his father's cousin. The family were members of the Sandemanian church, one of whose members, Michael Faraday, was a friend of the Deacon family. Faraday played an important part in the development of Henry junior's life and development. His education was at a Quaker school in Tottenham. He was apprenticed at the age of 14 to the London engineering firm of Galloway & Sons. When this company failed, he joined the business of Nasmyth, Gaskell and Company in their factory at Patricroft, Manchester, on the banks of the Bridgewater Canal. In the 1840s he moved to Pilkington Brothers at St Helens and became manager of their glass-polishing department. While he was there he invented an apparatus for the grinding and smoothing of glass. In 1851 he left to join John Hutchinson, alkali manufacturer, in Widnes.

In 1853 Deacon, with Edmond Leyland, filed his first patent, which was for an improved manufacturing process for sulphuric acid. Later that year Deacon left Hutchinson and went into partnership with the younger of the Pilkington brothers, William, to establish their own alkali works in Widnes on land between the Sankey Canal and St Helens and Runcorn Gap Railway. This partnership was dissolved in 1855. In a new partnership with his previous employer, Holbrook Gaskell who provided the capital, the firm of Gaskell, Deacon and Co was founded. At that time all factories manufacturing alkali were doing so by the Leblanc process. In 1838 Harrison Grey Dyar and John Henmming patented an ammonia-soda process of making alkali. Deacon experimented with this process but had no success and Gaskell persuaded him to abandon this project.

Between 1854 and 1876 Deacon, alone or in collaboration with others, filed at least 29 patents, all relating to alkali manufacture. Deacon also presented a number of papers to learned societies, including the British Association for the Advancement of Science in 1870, the Chemical Society in 1870, and the Warrington Literary and Philosophical Society in 1874.

He was elected to membership of the Manchester Literary and Philosophical Society on 15 November 1870

In 1867 Deacon took on a chemist, Ferdinand Hurter, on a month's probation. In time Hurter was to become the chief chemist to the company. Deacon worked with him to discover an improved method of manufacturing chlorine from hydrochloric acid, a noxious by-product of the Leblanc process, and in 1870 discovered a better process, using cupric chloride as a catalyst.

Henry Deacon also played a part in public life in Widnes. He was chairman of the Local Board and played a significant part in establishing the waterworks at Pex Hill. He was chairman of the first school board in the town.

Deacon married Emma Wade from Basford, Nottingham in 1851 with whom he had at least three sons and three daughters. After Emma's death he married Caroline Rutt of Islington, Middlesex, in 1866. They had at least three sons and a daughter. Deacon died in 1876 from typhoid fever at his home in Widnes. He was survived by his widow, seven sons and four daughters. His estate was in excess of £100,000.
