= Densitometry =

Measurement of optical density

Densitometry is the quantitative measurement of optical density in light-sensitive materials, such as photographic paper or photographic film, due to exposure to light.

== Overview ==
Optical density is a result of the darkness of a developed picture and can be expressed absolutely as the number of dark spots (i.e., silver grains in developed films) in a given area, but usually it is a relative value, expressed in a scale.

Since density is usually measured by the decrease in the amount of light which shines through a transparent film, it is also called absorptiometry, the measure of light absorption through the medium. The corresponding measuring device is called a densitometer (absorptiometer). The decadic (base-10) logarithm of the reciprocal of the transmittance is called the absorbance or density.

DMax and DMin refer to the maximum and minimum density that can be produced by the material. The difference between the two is the density range. The density range is related to the exposure range (dynamic range), which is the range of light intensity that is represented by the recording, via the Hurter–Driffield curve. In the context of photography, the dynamic range is often measured in "stops", which is the binary logarithm of the ratio of highest and lowest distinguishable exposures; in an engineering context, the dynamic range is usually given by its decadic logarithm expressed in decibels.

== Uses ==
According to the principle of operation of the densitometer, one can have:

- spot densitometry: the value of light absorption is measured at a single spot
- line densitometry: the values of successive spots along a dimension are expressed as a graph
- bidimensional densitometry: the values of light absorption are expressed as a 2D synthetic image, usually using false-color shading

Dual-energy X-ray absorptiometry is used in medicine to evaluate calcium bone density, which is altered in several diseases such as osteopenia and osteoporosis. Special devices have been developed and are in current use for clinical diagnosis, called bone densitometers.

== See also ==
- Sensitometry
