= Leon Warnerke =

Polish-born English inventor in photography

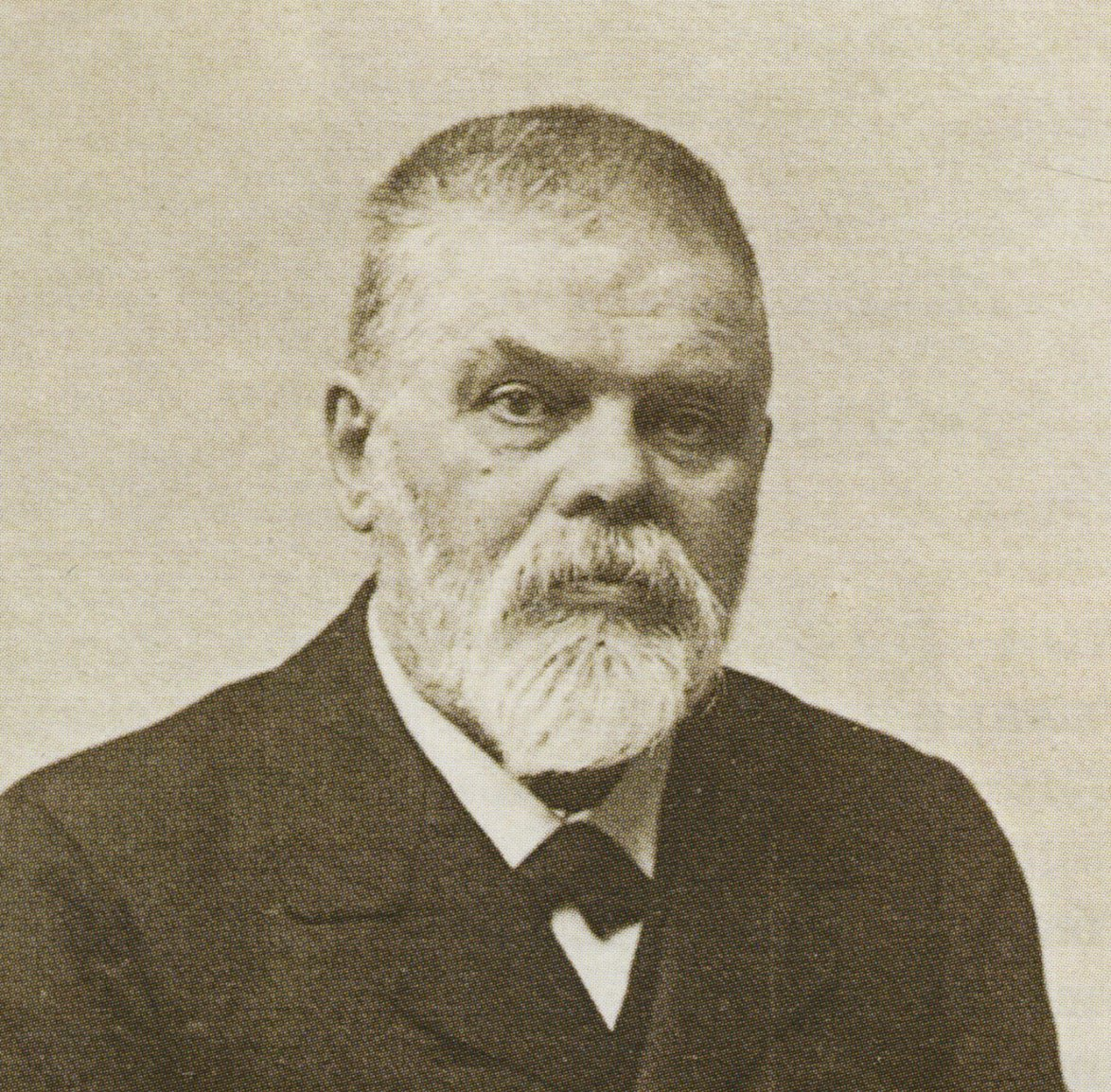
- Portrait of Warnerke, 1890s
- Born: Władysław Małachowski; Kobryń, Russian Empire
- Died: 7 October 1900; Geneva, Swiss Confederacy
- Education: Institute of Communication Engineers
- Occupations: Civil engineer and inventor
- Awards: Progress Medal (RPS)

Leon Warnerke (26 May 1837 – 7 October 1900) was a Polish civil engineer and inventor in the field of photography, independence activist, revolutionary and successful forger. Leon Warnerke was a pseudonym; his real name was Władysław Małachowski.

== Early career ==
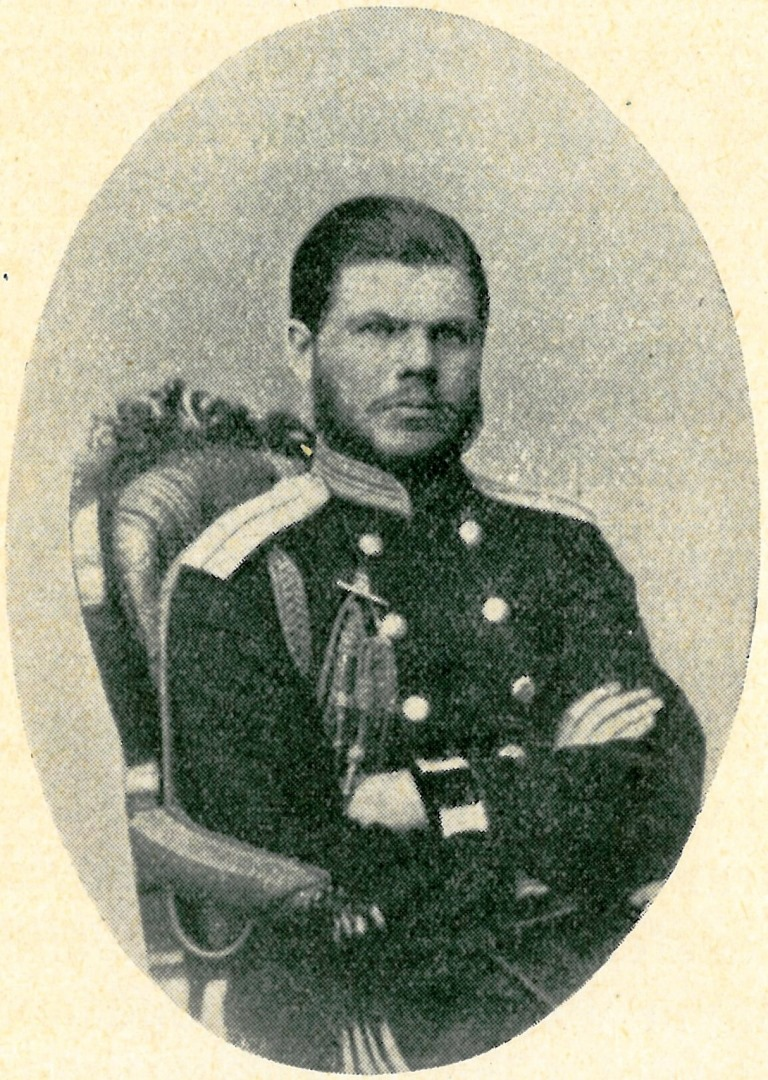
Uładzisłaŭ Małachoŭski (Leon Warnerze) in 1850

Małachowski was born in the Kobryń district of the Grodno Governorate in the Russian Empire to Julian Malachowski and Theophilia (née Jakubowska). Whilst his date of birth is unconfirmed, sources have referred to 1827, 1830 and 1839. Małachowski, whilst using the name Warnerke, claimed to have been born in Weißkirchen in the Austrian Empire, on the 27 May 1837. He graduated from the Institute of Communication Engineers in St. Petersburg in 1859, then worked in Vilnius on the construction of the Petersburg-Warsaw Railway. In 1863 he joined the January Uprising and then became a member of the National Government in Vilnius. After the collapse of the uprising, the police, on the orders of general M. Murawjow, issued an arrest warrant for Małachowski with a reward of 10 thousand zlotys, as a result of which he was forced to flee the country. He escaped with his wife on board an English ship to Great Britain, carrying a false passport in the name of Warnerke. Around 1870, he settled with his wife and daughter in London, and under a changed name - Leon Warnerke, began research and design in the field of photography. He lived in both London and St Petersburg, establishing a factory, the "Photographic Laboratory Varnerke and Co.", St. Petersburg, at 31 Voznesensky Ave., which manufactured his photographic materials.

== Inventor ==
=== Roll film ===
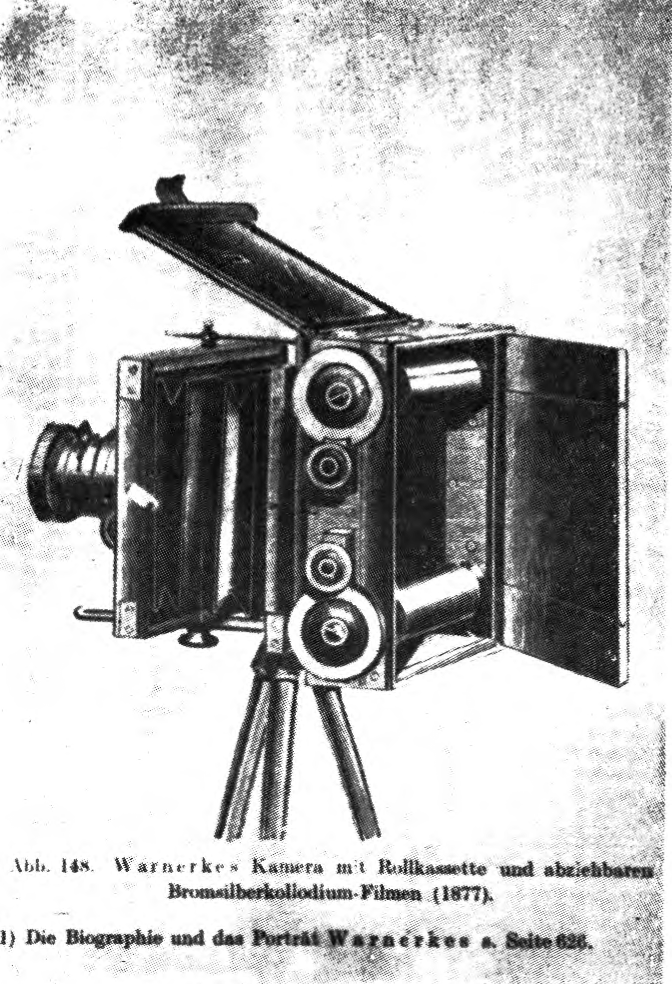
Wernerke's 1875 Roll-film camera

Warnerke is credited in 1875 with discovering the tanning effect of pyrogallic acid when used in the development of collodion, and an improvement of "dry" collodion emulsion, which he poured on a paper substrate in the form of a film layer. He covered the smooth tissue paper successively with several layers of pure collodion and a solution of gum arabic, which through the formed a base for a photosensitive collodion or gelatin emulsion thick enough to be easily separated from the paper and permanently transferred to a moistened glass plate. The negative thus obtained could be used to make a positive, just like a glass negative. This photosensitive material was produced by Warnerke's own company in sheets and rolls, from which rolls were cut into 100 photos for a single loading. Though, Warnerke achieved satisfactory results, the high production costs mitigated against greater than moderate commercial success.

In 1875, Warnerke constructed a camera equipped with a special cassette for the film he produced in loads of 100 photos. A monorail bellows camera, it was one of the first cameras in the world that permitted taking such a large number of photos on a single load. Warnerke's construction was 9 years ahead of the 1884 invention of roll film by George W. Eastman and Fr. Hannibal Goodwin. Warnerke's camera had a small window of orange glass in the rear wall through which could be read the number of the negative's frame and position each precisely as the film was wound through; a device commonly used in later, modern cameras.

In 1881, Warnerke constructed another model of a photographic film camera, this time reduced to 40 negatives. The film used in this model was perforated with small holes at intervals of one shot. Because the sensitive gelatin emulsion had no paper backing, the orange window had to be replaced in this model with a tiny alarm bell triggered by an electrical contact being made through the perforations, which sounded after each frame moved to the appropriate point for taking a photo. The battery was inside the film roll. Warnerke's idea was later used by Eastman's company.

=== Sensitometry ===
Warnerke's achievements include the sensitometer, the first effective means of measuring plate speed, developed in 1880, which in the following year was recognized as a standard by a special commission and became the basis for standardisation in the field of photosensitive materials. A reliable speed rating number for a given emulsion could be calculated against the known sensitivity of a collodion plate. Warnerke's sensitometer was equipped with an energised phosphorescent block of calcium sulphide for his exposing source through a glass plate with 25 square fields of increasing density, so that the light absorption coefficient increased twice every three degrees, similar to the scale of the modern DIN system. Sensitivity in Warnerke degrees was a measure used in England almost until the end of the 19th century, but abandoned by 1920.

From 1889 Warnerke manufactured silver chloride gelatin papers for photographic printing.

== Networking ==
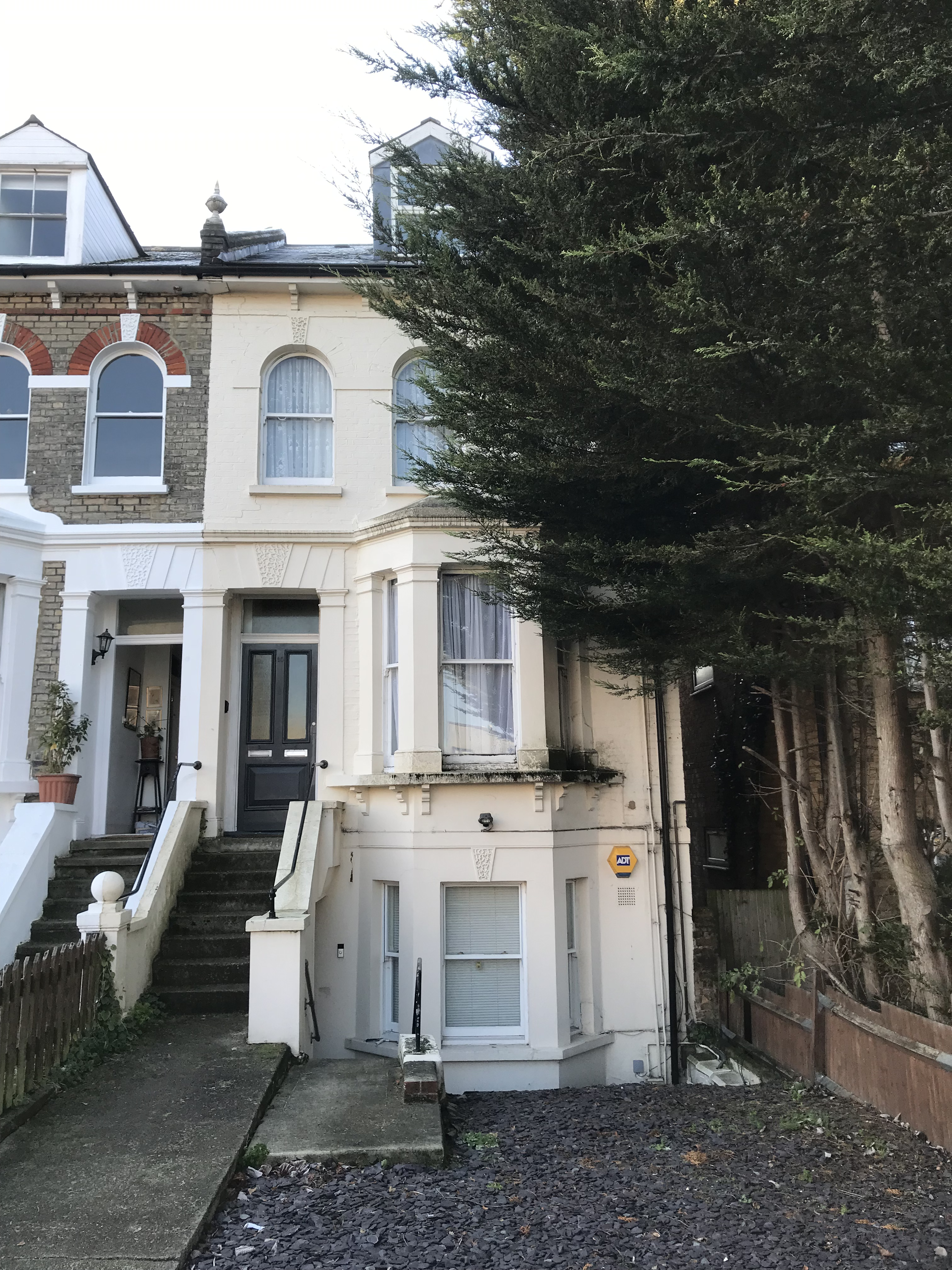
Warneke’s former residence on Linden Grove in Nunhead, London

Apart from his inventive and entrepreneurial activity, Warnerke maintained contacts with other designers and inventors in the field of photography, as well as with photographic organizations and societies in various European countries. It was thanks to Warnerke that the photographic community in London had the opportunity to learn about the latest achievements on the continent, such as the latest achievements of the Lumière brothers in the field of colour photography, or the Gabriel Lippmann interference method.

== Forger ==
Warnerke was a successful forger of several eastern European currencies, Russian roubles in particular, for which he was charged in Marseilles, though not convicted. His supposed death in 1900 at the age of 63 he may also have faked to avoid arrest.

== Legacy ==
In the 1990s a previously unknown archive of Warnerke's correspondence, forgeries, and personal documents was discovered by workers demolishing a building in London. The collection was subsequently split into two parts and auctioned by Phillips and Spink in 1991 and 2008 respectively.

== Awards ==
Malachowski was awarded the Progress Medal of the Photographic Society of Great Britain (known as Royal Photographic Society today) in 1882.
