= Vero Charles Driffield =

English chemical engineer

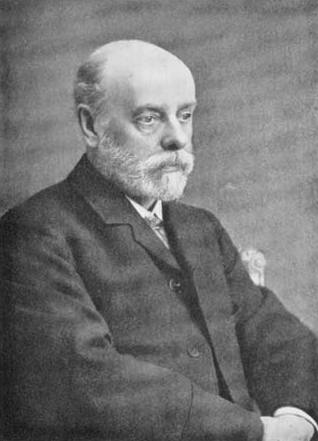
Vero Charles Driffield

Vero Charles Driffield (7 May 1848 – 14 November 1915) was an English chemical engineer who also became involved in photographic research.

Driffield was educated at Liverpool Collegiate and Sandbach Grammar School. He also attended a private school in Southport where he came into contact with a Swiss master called Dr Knecht. Leaving school he became an apprentice to a photographer in Southport but then decided to study engineering. In 1871 he became an engineer at the Gaskell–Deacon Works in Widnes, Lancashire where the chief chemist was the Swiss Ferdinand Hurter. Through a common interest in music they became friends and around 1876 Driffield persuaded Hurter to take up photography as a hobby. Hurter applied his scientific mind to photography and together they carried out important research into the subject. They published eight papers and in 1898 they were jointly awarded the Progress Medal of the Royal Photographic Society.

Driffield died in 1915 and is buried in the churchyard of Farnworth church near his former collaborator Ferdinand Hurter.

== See also ==
- Hurter and Driffield
- H&D speed numbers for film speed measurements
