= List of motion picture film stocks =

This is a list of motion picture films. Those films known to be no longer available have been marked "(discontinued)". This article includes color and black-and-white negative films, reversal camera films, intermediate stocks, and print stocks.

== 3M ==
3M no longer manufactures motion picture film.

- CR 160 Camera Reversal Film 16mm B&W (negative or reversal) (discontinued)
- CR 250 Camera Reversal Film 16mm B&W (negative or reversal) (discontinued)
- CR 64 Camera Reversal Film 16mm B&W (negative or reversal) (discontinued)
- Fine Grain Release Positive, Type 150, B&W, 35mm & 16mm (discontinued)
- Reversal Print, Type 160, B&W, 16mm (discontinued)
- Color Print, Type 650, 35mm & 16mm (discontinued)

Note: 1973 is first and last appearance in American Cinematographer Manual (4th edition).

== Agfa ==
Although a very early pioneer in trichromatic color film (as early as 1908), invented by German chemists Rudolf Fischer and Benno Homolka, Agfa film was first made commercially available in 1936 (16 mm reversal and 35 mm), Agfa-Gevaert has discontinued their line of motion picture camera films. Agfa Wittner-Chrome, Aviphot-Chrome or Agfachrome reversal stocks (rated at 200 ISO, made from Wittner-Chrome 35 mm still film) are available in 16 mm and 8 mm from Wittner-Cinetec in Germany or Spectra Film and Video in the United States. The Agfa brand was also used on widely produced East German film stocks, manufactured at the original Agfa plant in Wolfen, before rebranding to ORWO in 1964.

=== Consumer black and white reversal films ===
Make	Name	ISO	Dates	Notes	Process	Formats
Discontinued films
Agfa	Isopan F Umkehrfilm	25/15°	c1935–c1958	Very fine grain ortho-panchromatic reversal film.	B&W reversal	1×8, 2×8, 16 mm
Agfa	Isopan ISS Umkehrfilm	64/19°	c1935–c1958	Fine grain Ortho-panchromatic reversal film.	B&W reversal	1×8, 2×8, 16 mm

=== Consumer color reversal films ===
Make	Name	ISO	Dates	Notes	Process	Formats
Discontinued films
Agfa	Agfacolor CU T	25/15°	1952–1958	Consumer reversal film for daylight.	AP 41	1×8, 2×8, 16 mm
Agfa	Agfacolor CU K	25/15°	c1954–1960	Consumer reversal film for artificial light.	AP 41	1×8, 2×8, 16 mm
Agfa	Agfacolor CT13	16/13°	1958–1963	Very fine grain consumer reversal film for daylight.	AP 41	2×8, 16 mm
Agfa	Agfacolor CK16	32/16°	1960–1967	Consumer reversal film for artificial light. Replaced by Agfacolor CK17.	AP 41	1×8, 2×8, 16 mm
Agfa	Agfacolor CT13 Type S	16/13°	1963–1977	Improved version of Agfacolor CT13. Sold as "Agfachrome" in the USA.	AP 41	Single-8, 2×8, 16 mm
Agfa	Agfacolor CK17	40/17°	1967–1975	Consumer reversal film for artificial light. First Super 8 film from Agfa. EI 25/15° in daylight with 85B filter. Sold as "Agfachrome CK17" in the USA. Replaced by Agfachrome.	AP 41	Super 8, 2×8, 16 mm
Agfa	Agfachrome	40/17°	1974–1980	Consumer reversal film for artificial light. EI 25/15° in daylight with 85B filter. Replaced by Moviechrome 40.	AP 41	Super 8
Agfa	Agfachrome Plus	40/17°	1976–1980	Agfachrome with magnetic sound track in silent cartridge.	AP 41	Super 8
Agfa	Agfachrome Sound	40/17°	1976–1980	Agfachrome with magnetic sound track in sound cartridge.	AP 41	Super 8
Agfa	Moviechrome 40	40/17°	1980–1994	Consumer reversal film for artificial light. EI 25/15° in daylight with 85B filter. The emulsion was updated 3 times: twice in 1986, then in 1990. Production ended in 1991, sales continued until 1994.	AP 44 / E-6	Super 8
Agfa	Moviechrome 40 Plus	40/17°	1980–1986	Moviechrome 40 with magnetic sound track in silent cartridge.	AP 44 / E-6	Super 8
Agfa	Moviechrome 40 Sound	40/17°	1980–1990	Moviechrome 40 with magnetic sound track in sound cartridge.	AP 44 / E-6	Super 8
Agfa	Moviechrome 160	160/23°	1980–1985	High speed consumer reversal film for artificial light. EI 100/21° in daylight with 85B filter.	AP 44 / E-6	Super 8
Agfa	Moviechrome 160 Sound	160/23°	1980–1985	Moviechrome 160 with magnetic sound track in sound cartridge.	AP 44 / E-6	Super 8

=== XT ===
- XT100 (35 mm & 16 mm) (discontinued)
- XT125 (35 mm & 16 mm) (discontinued)
- XTR250 (35 mm & 16 mm) (discontinued)
- XT320 (35 mm & 16 mm) (discontinued)
- XTS400 (35 mm & 16 mm) (discontinued)

=== Black and white ===
- Agfapan 250 250D/200T (discontinued)

Note: 1993 is the last appearance of Agfa film stocks in the American Cinematographer Manual (seventh edition).

== DuPont ==
DuPont no longer manufactures film. It first entered the 35mm motion picture market in 1926.

- Rapid X Reversal Pan (discontinued)

The list below is of film stocks in use in 1956; the "B" designation was for 35mm, "A" was 16mm.

- Superior 1, Type 904B (ASA 23 Day, 20 Incandescent) B&W (discontinued)
- Superior 2, Type 926B (ASA 80 Day, 64 Incandescent) B&W (discontinued)
- Superior 3, Type 927B (ASA 125 Day, 100 Incandescent) B&W (discontinued)
- Duplicating Negative, Type 908B, Fine grain, panchromatic B&W (discontinued)
- Master Positive, Type 828B, Fine grain B&W (discontinued)
- Sound Recording, Type 801B, Variable area or density optical sound tracks (discontinued)
- VA Sound Recording, Type 831B, Variable area optical sound tracks (discontinued)
- Fine Grain Sound Recording, Type 837B, (to increase sharpness) (discontinued)
- Release Positive, Type 803B, High speed, normal grain (discontinued)
- Fine Grain Release Positive, Type 825B, for optimum picture and sound quality (discontinued)
- Title Stock, Type 805B, a high contrast film (discontinued)
- Low Contrast Positive, Type 824B, for kinescope recording (discontinued)

The list below is from 1960; "A" was 16mm, "B" was 35mm.

- Superior 2, Type 936 B and A (ASA 125 Day, 100 Tungsten) B&W (discontinued)
- Superior 4, Type 928 B and A (ASA 320 Day, 250 Tungsten) B&W (discontinued)
- Panchromatic Film, Type 914A (could be used as negative or reversal) B&W (discontinued)
- Rapid Reversal Film, Type 930A (could be used as negative or reversal) B&W (discontinued)
- High Speed Rapid Reversal Film, Type 931A (could be used as negative or reversal) B&W (discontinued)

The list below is from 1966; "A" was 16mm, "B" was 35mm.

- Fine Grain Superior 2 Negative, Type 936 B and A (ASA 125 Day, 100 Tungsten) B&W (discontinued)
- Superior 3 Negative, Type 937 B and A (ASA 250 Day, 200 Tungsten) B&W (discontinued)
- Superior 4 Negative, Type 928 B and A (ASA 320 Day, 250 Tungsten) B&W (discontinued)
- Rapid Reversal, Type 930A, (ASA 64 Day, 50 Tungsten) B&W (discontinued)
- High Speed Reversal, Type 931 B and A (ASA 160 Day, 125 Tungsten) B&W (discontinued)
- Ultra Speed Reversal, Type 932 B and A (ASA 320 Day, 250 Tungsten) B&W (discontinued)
- Fine Grain Duplicating Negative, Type 908 B and A, B&W (discontinued)
- Pan Rapid Reversal Duplicating, Type 910A, B&W (discontinued)
- Fine Grain Release Positive, Type 825 B and A, B&W (discontinued)
- TV Recording Film, Type 834 B and A, B&W (discontinued)

The 1969 list is identical to 1966. 1969 is the last appearance of DuPont motion picture film stocks in the American Cinematographer Manual.

The list below is from 1970; "A" was 16mm, "B" was 35mm. Films marked with ‡ could also be processed as a negative film stock

- Superior 2, Type 936 B and A, B&W Negative (discontinued)
- Superior 3, Type 937 B and A, B&W Negative (discontinued)
- Superior 4, Type 928 B and A, B&W Negative (discontinued)
- Rapid Reversal, Type 930A, B&W Reversal‡ (discontinued)
- High-Speed Rapid Reversal, Type 931 B and A, B&W Reversal‡ (discontinued)
- Ultra Speed Rapid Reversal, Type 932 B and A, B&W Reversal‡ (discontinued)

== Eastman Kodak ==
In films from 1950 on, the first two digits (the prefix) of the four-digit emulsion number identify the gauge and base of film:

Prefix	Description
12	Nitrate-base 35 mm negative film
13	Nitrate-base 35 mm print film
22	ESTAR-base 35 mm (or larger) camera film
23	ESTAR-base 35 mm (or larger) lab/print film
32	ESTAR-base 16 mm or 8 mm camera film
33	ESTAR-base 16 mm or 8 mm lab/print film

Prefix	Description
52	Acetate-base 35 mm (or larger) camera film
53	Acetate-base 35 mm (or larger) lab/print film
72	Acetate-base 16 mm or 8 mm camera film
73	Acetate-base 16 mm or 8 mm lab/print film

A "T" suffix designates a tungsten (3200K) balanced negative and a "D" suffix designates a daylight (5600K) negative. The number preceding this is the film's exposure index as determined by Kodak (it is not ISO speed).

=== Early nitrate films (1916–1941) ===
Number	Name	Introduced	Discontinued
	Cine Negative Film, Type E, orthochromatic	1916	1930
1201	Cine Negative Film, Type F, orthochromatic	1917	1930
	Super Speed Cine Negative Film, orthochromatic	1922	1930
1203	Kodak Panchromatic Cine Film Type I	1922	1941
1218	Type II Cine Negative Panchromatic Films	1928	19??
	Type III Cine Negative Panchromatic Films	1928	19??
1210	Panchromatic K, infrared	1928	19??
1217	Super-Sensitive Cine Negative Panchromatic	1931	19??
1227	Eastman Super-X	1935	1938
1230	Eastman Background-X	1938	1956 (5230 Safety)
1231	Eastman Plus-X	1938	19?? (5231 Safety)
1232	Eastman Super-XX	1938	19?? (5323 Safety)
	Super-XX reversal film, panchromatic	1938	1958
	Kodacolor 16 mm	1928	19??

=== Black-and-White (1954–1967) ===
- Eastman Tri-X panchromatic Negative film 5233 320D/250T introduced in 1954
- Plus-X reversal film 7276 50D/40T introduced in 1955
- Tri-X reversal film 7278 200D/160T introduced in 1955
- Plus-X Panchromatic Negative film 5231/7231 80D/64T introduced in 1956 (discontinued in 2010)
- Double-X 5222/7222 250D/200T introduced in 1959
- Plus-X reversal 7265 (16 mm & 8 mm) 100D/80T
- Tri-X reversal 7266 (16 mm & 8 mm) 200D/160T
- Eastman 4-X negative Pan film 5224/7224 500D/400T introduced in 1964 (discontinued in 1990)
- Kodak 4-X reversal film 7277 400D/320T introduced in 1967 discontinued in 1990
- Kodak Tri-X TV reversal film 7727, TVTX, no longer identified by EKC
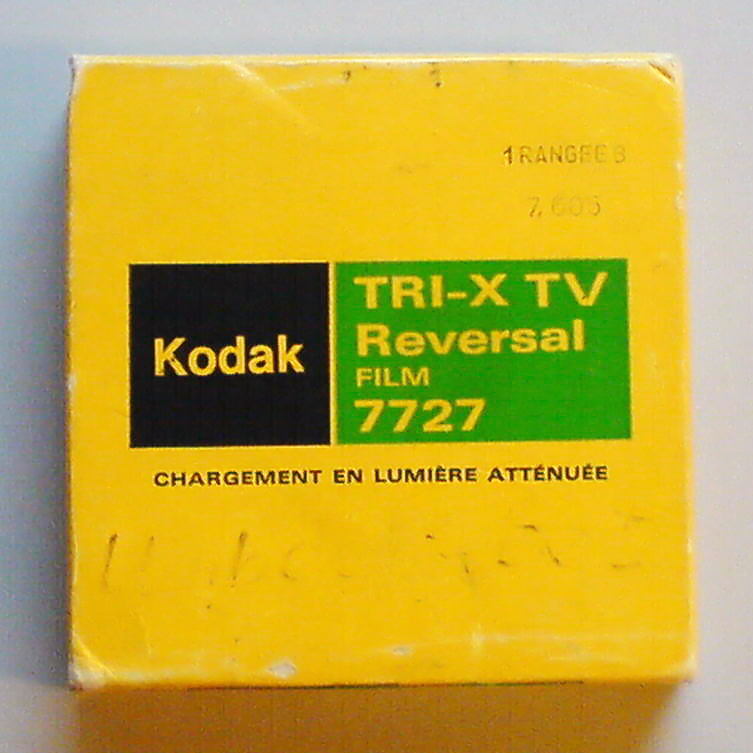
  7727
- Eastman Background-X Negative Film 5230, ISO 32 (discontinued)
- Eastman XT Panchromatic Negative Film 5220, 25D/20T, 1964–1970, replacing Background-X

=== Fine grain color negative films (1950–1968) ===
- Eastman Color Negative film 5247 16D introduced in 1950 (discontinued in 1952)
- Eastman Color Negative film 5248 25T introduced in 1952 (discontinued in 1959)
- Eastman Color Negative film 5250 50T introduced in 1959 (discontinued in 1962)
- Eastman Color Negative film 5251 50T introduced in 1962 (discontinued in 1968)
- Eastman Color Negative film 5254/7254 100T introduced in 1968 (discontinued March, 1977)

=== Eastman Color Negative II (ECN-2 process 1974–1976) ===
- 5247 100T Process ECN-2 introduced in 1974 (discontinued in 1976), it has sharper/finer grain compared to its predecessor 5254
- 5247/7247 100T (updated) introduced in 1976 (discontinued March, 1983)

=== Video News Film 16 mm (VNF-1)(1976–1981) ===
- Eastman Ektachrome Video News Film 7239 (VNF) 160D, introduced in 1976. Replaced 7241.
- Eastman Ektachrome Video News Film 7240 125T, introduced in 1976. Replaced 7242.
- Eastman Ektachrome High-Speed Video News Film 7250 400T, introduced in 1977.
- Eastman Ektachrome High-Speed Daylight Film 7251 400D, introduced in 1981.

=== Kodachrome color reversal film ===
- Kodachrome 16 mm introduced in 1935
- Kodachrome 35 mm (135) & 8 mm introduced in 1936 (discontinued in 2009)
- 5262 (16 mm) introduced in 1938 (discontinued in 1946)
- 5265 (16 mm) introduced in 1940 (discontinued in 1950)
- 5267 (35 mm) introduced in 1942
- 5268 (16 mm) introduced in 1946 (discontinued in 1958)
- 5269 (16 mm) introduced in 1950
- 7267 25D (16 mm & 8 mm) (discontinued)
- 7270 40T (16 mm & 8 mm) (discontinued)

=== Ektachrome color reversal film (E1–E6 and related processes) ===
- 5239/7239 (reversal) 160D
- 5240/7240 (16 mm & 8 mm) (reversal) 125T
- 5285/7285 100D (reversal) introduced in 1999 (discontinued in 2012)
- 7241 160D, introduced 1966, replaced 7257
- 7242 125T, introduced 1966, replaced 7258
- 7250 High Speed 400T
- 7251 High Speed 400D introduced in 1981
- 7252 25T introduced in 1970 (discontinued in 1984)
- 7255 introduced in 1958 (discontinued in 1970, replaced by 7252)
- 5256/7256 64D, 1963–1984
- 7257 160D, introduced 1959
- 7258 125T, introduced 1959
- 7280 (8 mm) 64T (discontinued in 2010)
- Ektachrome (Type A) 160T (super 8 mm) introduced in 1971
- Ektachrome SM 7244 (super 8 mm)(reversal) introduced in 1975
- 7294 100D (Super-8, 16mm) introduced in 2018, reformulated version of 5285/7285 100D

=== Eastmancolor Negative (1982–1986) ===
- 7291 100T introduced in 1983 (discontinued in 1989)
- 7292 320T introduced in 1986 (discontinued in 1992) (First partial "T-Grain" stock)
- 5293/7293 250T introduced in 1982 (discontinued 1983)
- 5294/7294 400T (35 mm)/320T (16 mm) introduced in 1983, discontinued in 1986
- 5295 400T introduced in 1986
- 5297/7297 HS Day 250D introduced in 1986 (discontinued in 1997)

=== EXR color negative (ECN-2 process 1989–1996) ===
- 5245/7245 EXR 50D introduced in 1989 (discontinued in 2006)
- 5248/7248 EXR 100T introduced in 1989 (discontinued in 2005)
- 5287/7287 EXR 200T introduced in 1996 (discontinued in 1996)
- 5293/7293 EXR 200T introduced in 1992 (discontinued in 2004)
- 5296/7296 EXR 500T introduced in 1989 (discontinued in 1995)
- 5298/7298 EXR 500T introduced in 1994 (discontinued in 2003)

=== Vision color negative (ECN-2 process 1996–2002) ===
- 5246/7246 Vision 250D introduced in 1997 (discontinued in 2005)
- 5263/7263 Vision 500T introduced in 2002 (discontinued in 2003)
- 5274/7274 Vision 200T introduced in 1997 (discontinued in 2006)
- 5277/7277 Vision 320T introduced in 1996 (discontinued in 2005)
- 5279/7279 Vision 500T introduced in 1996 (discontinued in 2006)
- 5284/7284 Vision 500T "Expression" introduced in 2001 (discontinued in 2003)
- 5289 Vision 800T introduced in 1998 (discontinued in 2004)
- 7289 Vision 800T (16 mm) introduced in 1999 (discontinued in 2004)

=== Vision2 color negative (ECN-2 process 2002–2007) ===
- 5201/7201 Vision2 50D introduced in 2005. discontinued in 2012.
- 5205/7205 Vision2 250D introduced in 2004. discontinued in 2009.
- 5212/7212 Vision2 100T introduced in 2004. discontinued in 2010.
- 5217/7217 (35, 16, & 8 mm) Vision2 200T introduced in 2004. discontinued in 2010.
- 5218/7218 (35, 16, & 8 mm) Vision2 500T introduced in 2002. discontinued in 2009.
- 5229/7229 Vision2 "Expression" 500T introduced in 2003. discontinued in 2011.
- 5260 Vision2 500T introduced in 2009 (35 mm only). discontinued in 2011.
- 5299/7299 Vision2 "HD Color Scan film" 500T introduced in 2005. discontinued in 2009.

=== Vision3 color negative (ECN-2 process 2007–present) ===
- 5219/7219 Vision3 500T introduced in 2007. SO-219 is ESTAR-base variant.
- 5207/7207 Vision3 250D introduced in 2009.
- 5213/7213 (35, 16, & 8 mm) Vision3 200T introduced in 2010.
- 5203/7203 Vision3 50D introduced in 2011.

=== Print films (1941–present) ===
		Introduced/Discontinued?		
Number	Name	Intro.	Disc.?	Notes
1302	Eastman Fine Grain Release Positive	1941	1950	Black-and-white, nitrate-base. Replaced by 5302.
5302/7302	Eastman Fine Grain Release Positive	1950	2015	Replaced 1302.
5381	Eastman Color Print	1950	1953	Replaced by 5382. Process ECP, 45 minute wet time. Not the same as 1972 film.
5382	Eastman Color Print	1952	1966	Replaced 5381 ("Better definition"), replaced by 5385.
7282	Eastman Color Print	1952	1961	Replaced by 7383.
7303	Eastman Fine Grain Release Positive	1960	1962	"16mm only. Better image structure than 7302."
5385/7385	Eastman Color Print	1962	1972	Replaced 5382 and 7383. "Improved definition and speed". Process ECP, wet time reduced to 28 min. in 1966, and 20 min. in 1967. Not the same as 1993 film.
7381	Eastman Color Print (super 8 only)	1970	19??	Replaced 7380.
7381	Eastman Color Print (16 mm)	1971	Jan. 1982	Replaced 7385.
5381	Eastman Color Print	1972	Jan. 1982	Replaced 5385 "for 35mm end use". Not the same as 1950 film.
Number	Name	Intro.	Disc.?	Notes
5383/7383	Eastman Color SP Print	1974	1983	Process ECP-2. Similar quality to 5381/7381. "Short Process" (10-minute wet time)
5738/7738	Eastman Color SP Low Contrast Print	1977	c.1983	Process ECP-2.
7378	Eastman Color LF print	1978	1982	Process ECP. "Improved cyan dye dark-keeping stability"
7379	Eastman Color LFSP print	1978	1983	Process ECP-2 counterpart of 7379
5384/7384	Eastman Color Print	1982	19??	Replaced 5381/7381, 5383/7283, 7378, 7379. So-called low-fade "LPP." Brought "improved cyan dye dark-keeping" and ECP-2 from 7379, and "reduced sensitivity to process variations" introducing process ECP-2A (persulfate bleach replaced ferricyanide bleach, and bromide concentration was increased). Modified in 1998 for ECP-2B (eliminating formalin).
5380/7380	Eastman Color LC Print	1983	c.1993	Replaced 5738/7738. "Low contrast for video transfers." Process ECP-2A, dye stability, and reduced process sensitivity from 5384
5385/7385	Eastman Color LC Print	1993	19??	Replaced 5380/7380. Not the same as 1962–1972 film.
5386/7386	Eastman EXR Color Print	1993	c.2002	Replaced 5384/7384
2386/3386	Eastman EXR Color Print	1994	c.1999	ESTAR-base version of 5386, with rem-jet backing.
SO-886	Special Order 886	1997	1998?	ESTAR-base. Antistatic layer.
Number	Name	Intro.	Disc.?	Notes
2383/3383	Vision Color Print	1998	no	Replaced 5386. ESTAR-base; processes ECP-2D and ECP-2E, no rem-jet backing. (Process ECP-2E removes soundtrack redeveloper and the "first fixer"; it is suitable for cyan-dye soundtrack prints)
2393	Vision Premier Color Print	1998	2015	ESTAR-base; processes ECP-2D and ECP-2E. Higher density blacks than 2383.
2395	Vision Color Teleprint	c.1999	2010	Low-contrast prints
2302	Black-and-white Print	c.1999	no	Complements 5302. Process D97.
Number	Name	Intro.	Disc.?	Notes

=== Lab films ===
		Introduced/Discontinued?		
Number	Name	Intro.	Disc.?	Notes
5234/7234	Eastman Fine Grain Duplicating Panchromatic Negative film	1958	2017	
2234/3234	Eastman Fine Grain Duplicating Panchromatic Negative film	1958	no	ESTAR-based version of 5234.
5235	Eastman Panchromatic film	unknown	1998	35 and 70 mm only.
7361	Eastman Reversal BW Print Film	1962	unknown, but disc.	16 mm only, Black-and White.
5249/7249	Eastman Color Reversal Intermediate film	1968	unknown, but disc.	Process CRI-1.
5360/7360	Eastman Direct MP Film	1968	unknown, but disc.	
Number	Name	Intro.	Disc.?	Notes
5369	Eastman High Contrast Panchromatic Film	unknown	2011	35 and 70 mm only.
2369/3369	Eastman High Contrast Panchromatic Film	unknown	2011	ESTAR-based version of 5369. Also provided 16 mm.
5272/7272	Eastman Color Internegative II Film	1980	2014	Process ECN-2. Replaced 5271/7271.
5243	Eastman Color Intermediate Film	1976	unknown, but disc.	Introduced in 1976, improved in 1986
5244/7244	Eastman Color Intermediate Film	1992	unknown, but disc.	Replaced 5243/7243.
2244	Eastman Color Intermediate Film	1992	unknown, but disc.	ESTAR-based version of 5244.
Number	Name	Intro.	Disc.?	Notes
5363/7363	Eastman High Contrast Black/White Positive Film	c. 1999	no	Used for title production
5366/7366	Eastman Fine Grain Duplicating Positive Film	c. 1999	no	
2374	Kodak Panchromatic Sound Recording Film	c. 1999	no	ESTAR-based and 35 mm only. For optical soundtrack recording use.
2378E/3378E	Eastman EXR Sound Recording Film	c. 1999	no	ESTAR-based only. For optical soundtrack recording use.
2238	Kodak Panchromatic Separation Film	c. 1999	2023	ESTAR-based version and 35 mm only too.
5242/7242	Kodak Vision Color Intermediate Film	c. 1998	no	Process ECN-2.
2242/3242	Kodak Vision Color Intermediate Film	c. 1998	no	ESTAR-based version of 5242. Process ECN-2.
Number	Name	Intro.	Disc.?	Notes
5254/2254	Kodak Vision3 Color Digital Intermediate Film	2010	no	Recording film.
2332	Kodak Color Asset Protection Film	2012	2014	Recording film. ESTAR-based. Optimized for productions that originate or are finished digitally.
2237	Kodak Vision3 Digital Separation Film	2012	no	Black-and-white recording film. ESTAR-based. Intended for making archival separations from color digital masters.

=== Other ===
- 5600 Primetime EXR 640T Teleproduction Film introduced in 1995 (discontinued)
- 5620/7620 Primetime 640T introduced in 1997 (discontinued)
- SFX 200T Color Negative Film (35 mm only) introduced in 1998. Special-order film intended for special effects. (discontinued in 2004)
- 5230/7230 500T Color Negative Film introduced in 2011 (discontinued in 2012)
- Verita 200D 5206/7206 Color Negative Film introduced in 2026
- Ektagraphic High Contrast Slide (HCS) orthochromatic negative film for making reverse-text title slides etc.
- Fine Grain Release Positive, blue-sensitive negative film specially for motion film duplication
- Rapid Process Copy (RPC) ultra-slow duplicating film with a blue-tinted base

== FilmoTec ==
FilmoTec is German company in the tradition of Agfa/ORWO. The FilmoTec GmbH was formed in 1998 to continue to manufacture a range of black and white camera and technical films for motion picture use under the ORWO brand.

Discontinued films:

- FilmoTec N 74 – ISO 400/27°, (Negative film)
- FilmoTec N 74 Plus – ISO 400/27°, (Negative film)
- FilmoTec LF 2 – orthochromatic, high contrast, (Leader Film)

Available films:

- FilmoTec UN 54 – ISO 100/21°, (Universal Negative film)
- FilmoTec N 75 – ISO 400/27°, (Negative film)
- FilmoTec TF 12D – orthochromatic film for digital sound tracks, (Ton- Film Digital)
- FilmoTec PF 2 – (Positive Fine-grain film)
- FilmoTec PF 2 V3 – positive copy film with anti-halation layer
- FilmoTec DP 31 – (Duplicating Positive film)
- FilmoTec DN 21 – (Duplicating Negative film)
- FilmoTec LF 3 – clear leader film
- FilmoTec LF 3S – clear leader film with anti-static layer
- FilmoTec LF 4 – white leader film
- FilmoTec LF 10 – leader film with coated emulsion
- Wolfen NC 500 – ISO 400/27°, color negative film based on Agfa stock
- Wolfen NC 400 – ISO 400/27°, color negative film similar to NC 500 but with finer grain and more pronounced green tones

== Foma ==
Foma Bohemia spol. s r.o. (historically Fotochema, n.p., Hradec Králové) is a Czech manufacturer of black and white photographic materials. Motion picture materials are also part of the production.

=== Black and white films ===
Name	ISO	Dates	Notes	Formats
Discontinued films
Fomapan R 17	40/17°	1960s–1990	Fine grain panchromatic reversal film for amateur use.	2×8, DS 8, 16mm
Fomapan R 21	100/21°	1960s–1990	Panchromatic reversal film for amateur use. EI 80 in artificial light.	2×8, DS 8, 16mm
Fomapan R 24	200/24°	1960s–1990	High speed panchromatic reversal film for amateur use. Suitable for use in artificial light. EI 160 in artificial light.	2×8, DS 8, 16mm
Kinopozitiv	2/4°	1960s–1990	Film for making positive prints from black and white motion picture negatives.	2×8mm, 16mm, 2×16mm, 35mm
Kinopozitiv T	?	1960s–c1980	Film for making copies and positive prints for television.	35mm
Titulkovací film	2,5/5°	1960s–1970s	Black and white positive film for making title sequences. Very fine grain, high contrast.	2×8, 16mm
Dokument K	2/4°	1980s–1990	Unsensitized black and white film for making motion picture copies; could also be used for making title sequences.	2×8, DS 8, 16mm, 35mm
Available films
Fomapan R 100	100/21°	c1998–present	Panchromatic reversal film introduced in the late 1990s.	2×8, DS 8, 16mm
Fomapan 100 Cine	100/21°	2024–present	Panchromatic negative film. Cine version of Fomapan 100 still film.	2×8, DS 8, 16mm
Foma Ortho 400 Cine	400/27°	2024–present	High-speed orthochromatic negative film. Cine version of Foma Ortho 400 still film.	2×8, DS 8, 16mm
Fomapan 400 Cine	400/27°	2026–present	High-speed panchromatic negative film. Cine version of Fomapan 400 still film.	2×8, DS 8, 16mm

=== Color reversal films ===
Name	ISO	Dates	Notes	Formats
Discontinued films
Fomachrom MD 13	16/13°	1980s	Trial run of Fomachrom MD in slower sensitivity. Sold in Fomachrom MD 17 boxes with "MD 17" taped over with "MD 13".	DS 8
Fomachrom MD 17	40/17°	c1982–1990	Daylight balanced color reversal film for amateur use. Warmer color rendering.	2×8, DS 8, 16mm
Fomachrom MA 17	40/17°	1980s	Tungsten balanced color reversal film which was developed by Fotochema but never reached the market. Similar properties to Fomachrom MD 17.	n/a

== Forte ==
Forte photochemical industry, Vác was a hungarian film manufacturer. Forte no longer manufactures film.

- Fortepan 2×8 – ISO 80/20° panchromatic reversal film for amateur use, discontinued

== FOTON ==
FOTON was a brand of Warsaw Photochemical Works (WZF), a Polish state-owned film manufacturer. WZF no longer manufactures film.

=== Black and white films ===
Name	ISO	Dates	Notes	Formats
Discontinued films
Fotopan	?	1960s	Black and white amateur film.	2×8, 16mm
Fotopan Ultra	?	1960s	Black and white amateur film.	16mm
Fotopan R 50	50/18°	1960s–c1985	Panchromatic reversal film for amateur use. ASA 32 for artificial light.	2×8, 16mm
Fotopan RF	80/20°	1980s	Panchromatic reversal film for amateur use. ASA 50 for artificial light.	2×8, 16mm
Film Pozytywowy	1/1°	1960s–1970s	Fine grain black and white film on safety base for making positive copies. Later replaced by FOTON PD-2.	16mm, 2×16mm, 35mm
PD-2	n/a	?	Fine-grain orthochromatic black and white positive film.	16mm, 35mm

=== Color positive films ===
Name	ISO	Dates	Notes	Formats
Discontinued films
Fotoncolor	n/a	1957–?	First Fotoncolor positive film. Soon replaced by Fotoncolor 2 due to poor quality.	35mm
Fotoncolor 2	n/a	1960s	Film for making positive prints.	4×8mm, 16mm, 2×16mm, 35mm
Fotoncolor 3	n/a	1960s	Film for making positive prints.	4×8mm, 16mm, 2×16mm, 35mm
Fotoncolor 3 M	n/a	1970s	Film for making positive prints.	?
Fotoncolor 3 P	n/a	1970s	Film for making positive prints.	?

== Fujifilm ==
Fujifilm stopped production of all motion picture film stocks on March 31, 2013. For negative stocks, "85" prefix designates 35 mm, "86" prefix designates 16 mm stock. Stock numbers ending in a "2" are Fuji's Super-F emulsions (1990s) and the stocks ending in "3" are the new Eterna emulsions.

Also, Eterna Vivid series negatives' last second suffix as "4", and the ending suffix as different "E.I.".

For intermediate stocks, as negatives', adding "45" prefix designates 35 mm in polyester (PET) base, and "87" prefix designates 65/70 mm.

For positive and print stocks, "35" indicates 35 mm print film, and "36" indicates 16 mm print film.

Fuji also introduced their Reala film, a color stock with a fourth color emulsion layer, which is also the fastest daylight balanced color motion picture stock ever offered at 500 ISO.

As of March 2013, Fuji had ceased production of all motion picture film.

=== Color negatives (1980s) ===
- 8517 100T introduced in 1977
- 8511/8521 (35 mm & 16 mm) Fujicolor A 125T
- 8514/8524 (35 mm & 16 mm) Fujicolor AX 500T
- 8518/8528 (35 mm & 16 mm) Fujicolor A 250T

=== Reversal (1980s) ===
- 8427 (16 mm) Fujicolor RT 125T (reversal)
- 8428 (16 mm) Fujicolor RT 500T (reversal)

=== Black-and-white ===
- 71112 (35 mm) Fuji FG 80D/64T
- 72161 (16 mm) Fuji RP 80D/64T

=== F-Series (1988) ===
- 8510/8610 F64T (discontinued)
- 8520/8620 F64D (discontinued)
- 8530/8630 F125T (discontinued)
- 8550/8650 F250T (discontinued)
- 8560/8660 F-250D (discontinued)
- 8570/8670 F-500T (discontinued)

=== Super F-Series (1999) ===
- F-64D 8522/8622
- F-125T 8532/8632
- F-250T 8552/8652
- F-250D 8562/8662
- F-500T 8572/8672
- F-400T 8582/8682

=== Reala ===
Containing a fourth color layer, Reala is nominally considered a part of the Super-F series. Its analogue in the stills market is Superia Reala.

- Reala 500D 8592/8692 was introduced in December 2001, and discontinued in February 2011

=== Eterna (2004–2013) ===
- Eterna Vivid 160T 8543/8643 introduced in 2007
- Eterna Vivid 250D 8546/8646 introduced in 2010
- Eterna 250D 8563/8663 introduced in 2006
- Eterna 250T 8553/8653 introduced in 2006
- Eterna 400T 8583/8683 introduced in March 2005, discontinued in July 2011
- Eterna 500T 8573/8673 introduced in 2004
- Eterna Vivid 500T 8547/8647 introduced in 2009

=== Print films ===
- F-CP 3519 Fujicolor positive film. Polyester (PET) base. Introduced in 1996.
- F-CP 3519D Fujicolor positive film. High-contrast. Polyester base. Introduced in 1999.
- Super F-CP 3510/3610 Fujicolor positive film. Polyester base. Introduced in 2002.
- Eterna-CP 3513DI/3613DI Fujicolor positive film. High-contrast. Polyester base. Introduced in 2002.
- Eterna-CP 3521XD Fujicolor positive film. High-contrast. Polyester base. Introduced in 2007.
- Eterna-CP 3514DI/3614DI Fujicolor positive film. High-contrast. Polyester base. Introduced in April 2010.
- Eterna-CP 3523XD Fujicolor positive film. High-contrast. Polyester base. Introduced in 2010.
- Eterna-CP 3512/3612 Fujicolor positive film. High-contrast. Polyester base. Introduced in 2010.

=== Intermediate film ===
- Eterna-CI 8503/4503(Polyester base)/8603 Fujicolor intermediate film.
- Super F-CI 8702(65/70 mm)/8502/4502(Polyester base)/8602 Fujicolor intermediate film. (One of the Super F-Series)

=== Recording film ===
- Eterna-RDI 8511/4511(Polyester base) Fujicolor recording film (RDI short for Recording for Digital Intermediate). Designed to be used with Arri Laser.
- Eterna-RDS 4791(Polyester base) Fujicolor recording film (RDS short for Recording for Digital Separation). The black-and-white recording film designed to be used for digital archive. Process with D96 or D97. Introduced in April 2010.

=== Amateur films ===
- Fujipan R50 – Single-8; ASA 50 for all lighting situations; 1970s amateur panchromatic reversal film loaded in a Single-8 cassette, discontinued
- Fujipan R200 – Single-8; ASA 200; 1970s amateur panchromatic reversal film with PET base suitable for dim light, loaded in a Single-8 cassette, discontinued
- Fujichrome R25 – Single-8; ASA 25 for daylight; 1970s amateur color reversal film loaded in a Single-8 cassette, discontinued
- Fujichrome RT50 – Single-8; ASA 50 for artificial light; 1970s amateur color reversal film loaded in a Single-8 cassette, discontinued

== GAF/Ansco ==
GAF/Ansco no longer manufactures film.

- GAF Anscochrome 500 D (discontinued)
- GAF Anscochrome 100 T (discontinued)

The list below is of 35mm film stocks in use in 1956.

- Ansco Color Negative, Type 844. E.I. 16 Day (w/ Wratten #85 filter), 25 Tungsten (discontinued)
- Ansco Color Dupe Negative, Type 846, for Intermediate Negatives (discontinued)
- Ansco Color Print Film, Type 848, for release prints, balanced for approx. 3,000 degrees K (discontinued)
- Ansco Color Reversal Duplicating Film, Type 538, for duplication of positive image originals (discontinued)
- Ansco Supreme, Type 453, panchromatic (black & white?). E.I. 50 Day, 32 Tungsten (discontinued)
- Ansco Ultra-Speed, Type 456, very high speed, medium grain, panchromatic. E.I. 100 Day, 64 Tungsten (discontinued)

== Ilford ==
Ilford specialises in B&W films and, until 2003, produced motion picture versions of their photographic films for 16mm and 35mm cameras.

- FP4plus
- HP5plus

(As used in Hollywood, 1960s)

- Ilford Pan F Negative, ASA 25 Day, 20 Tungsten (B&W, 35mm & 16mm)
- Ilford FP3 Negative, ASA 80 Day, 64 Tungsten (B&W, 35mm & 16mm)
- Ilford HP3 Negative, ASA 200 Day, 160 Tungsten (B&W, 35mm & 16mm
- Ilford Mark V Negative, ASA 250 Day, 200 Tungsten (B&W, 35mm & 16mm)
- Ilford HPS Negative, ASA 400 Day, 320 Tungsten (B&W, 35mm & 16mm)
- Ilford HRT Television Recording Film (B&W, 16mm)
- Ilford Fine Grain Safety Positive for release prints (B&W, 35mm & 16mm)
- Ilford Newsreel Positive (B&W, 35mm)
- Ilford SFX 200 Negative for Special Effects, ASA 200 Day, 100 Tungsten (B&W, 16mm)

Note: 1973 is last appearance in American Cinematographer Manual (fourth edition).

== ORWO (Agfa Wolfen) ==
VEB Filmfabrik Wolfen was an East German film manufacturer, originally an Agfa factory in Wolfen. ORWO stands for ORiginal WOlfen. VEB Filmfabrik Wolfen no longer manufactures film. Motion picture production was transferred to FilmoTec in 1998.

=== Consumer films ===
==== Black and white reversal films ====
Make	Name	ISO	Dates	Notes	Process	Formats
Discontinued films
Agfa	Isopan F Umkehrfilm	25/15°	?–1964	Very fine grain panchromatic film suitable for daylight scenes. After 1964 sold as ORWO UP 15.	ORWO 4100	1×8, 2×8, 16mm
Agfa	Isopan ISS Umkehrfilm	64/19°	?–1964	Fine grain panchromatic reversal film. After 1964 sold as ORWO UP 19.	ORWO 4100	1×8, 2×8, 16mm
Agfa	Isopan Ultra Umkehrfilm	125/22°	?–1964	High speed panchromatic reversal film. After 1964 sold as ORWO UP 22.	ORWO 4100	2×8
ORWO	UP 15	25/15°	1964–c1990	Very fine grain panchromatic film suitable for daylight scenes.	ORWO 4100 / 4105	1×8, 2×8, DS 8, 9,5mm, 16mm
ORWO	UP 19	64/19°	1964–c1968	Panchromatic film with high red sensitivity, suitable for scenes in artificial light or in harsher weather.	ORWO 4100	1×8, 2×8, 9,5mm, 16mm
ORWO	UP 22	125/22°	1964–c1972	High speed panchromatic film for harsher weather conditions and artificial light. Replaced by UP 21 by 1972.	ORWO 4100	1×8, 2×8, DS 8, 9,5mm, 16mm
ORWO	UP 27	400/27°	1964–c1990	Ultra high speed panchromatic film suitable for night scenes and slow motion shots.	ORWO 4100 / 4105	2×8, DS 8, 16mm
ORWO	UP 21	100/21°	c1972–c1990	Similar properties as UP 22, improved formulation.	ORWO 4105	2×8, DS 8, 16mm
ORWO	UP 17	40/17°	c1977–c1982	Fine grain panchromatic film made exclusively in a Super 8 cassette. Most likely produced only for export. Discontinued by 1983.	ORWO 4105	Super 8

==== Color negative films ====
Make	Name	ISO	Dates	Notes	Process	Formats
Discontinued films
ORWO COLOR	NT 18	50/18°	1964–1965	Color negative film balanced for daylight. Remaining stock of Agfacolor Negativfilm Ultra T.	ORWO 5160	16mm
ORWO COLOR	NK 18	50/18°	1964–1965	Color negative film balanced for artificial light. Remaining stock of Agfacolor Negativfilm Ultra K.	ORWO 5160	16mm

==== Color reversal films ====
Make	Name	ISO	Dates	Notes	Process	Formats
Discontinued films
Agfacolor	Umkehrfilm T	16/13°	1948–1955	Daylight balanced color reversal film. In 1964 reintroduced as ORWOCOLOR UT 13.	ORWO 9160	1×8, 2×8, 16mm
Agfacolor	Umkehrfilm K	16/13°	1948–1958	Tungsten balanced color reversal film. In 1964 reintroduced as ORWOCOLOR UK 14.	ORWO 9160	1×8, 2×8, 16mm
Agfacolor	Umkehrfilm Ultra T	32/16°	1954–1964	Daylight balanced color reversal film. After 1964 sold as ORWOCOLOR UT 16.	ORWO 9160	1×8, 2×8, 9,5mm, 16mm
Agfacolor	Umkehrfilm Ultra K	32/16°	1958–1964	Tungsten balanced color reversal film. Replaced by ORWOCOLOR UK 18.	ORWO 9160	1×8, 2×8, 16mm
ORWO COLOR	UT 13	16/13°	1964–1975	Very fine grain color reversal film for daylight. Film renders red very boldly.	ORWO 9160	2×8, DS 8
ORWO COLOR	UT 16	32/16°	1964–1968	Daylight balanced color reversal film.	ORWO 9160	1×8, 2×8, 9,5mm, 16mm
ORWO COLOR	UK 14	20/14°	1964–1968	Tungsten balanced color reversal film.	ORWO 9160	1×8, 2×8, 16mm
ORWO COLOR	UK 18	50/18°	1965–1974	Tungsten balanced color reversal film.	ORWO 9160	1×8, 2×8, DS 8, 16mm
ORWO CHROM	UK 17	40/17°	1974–1990	Tungsten balanced color reversal film. Colder color rendition. Replaced older ORWOCOLOR films in mid-70s. Film in Super 8 cassette produced in association with soviet manufacturer Svema.	ORWO 9165 / 9166	Super 8, 2×8, DS 8, 16mm
ORWO CHROM	UT 15	25/15°	1975–1990	Daylight balanced color reversal film. Colder color rendition. Replaced older ORWOCOLOR films in mid-70s. Film in Super 8 cassette produced in association with soviet manufacturer Svema.	ORWO 9165 / 9166	Super 8, 2×8, DS 8, 16mm

==== Leader films ====
Make	Name	Notes	Formats
Discontinued films
ORWO	Vorspannfilm Amateursatz	Leader film for amateur use sold in the usual formats. Box contained 15m of red and green leader films.	8mm, Super 8

=== Professional films ===
==== Black and white negative films ====
Make	Name	ISO	Notes	Process	Formats
Discontinued films
Agfa	Isopan FF	25/15°	See ORWO NP 2.	ORWO 1180	16mm, 35mm
Agfa	Finopan	32/16°	See ORWO NP 3.	ORWO 1180	16mm, 35mm
Agfa	Superpan	125/22°	See ORWO NP 5.	ORWO 1180	16mm, 35mm
Agfa	Ultrarapid	400/27°	See ORWO NP 7.	ORWO 1180	16mm, 35mm
Agfa	Zeitlupenfilm	400/27°	See ORWO NP 71.	ORWO 1180	16mm, 35mm
Agfa	Infrarapid 750	n/a	See ORWO NI 750.	ORWO 1180	35mm
Agfa	Tonnegativfilm TF 4	n/a	Sound recording film. Discontinued by 1964.	ORWO 1180	16mm, 35mm
Agfa	Tonnegativfilm TF 6	n/a	Sound recording film. Replaced by ORWO TF 6 in 1964.	ORWO 1180	16mm, 35mm
ORWO	NP 2	25/15°	Fine grain panchromatic film for amateur and professional use. Discontinued by 1968.	ORWO 1180	16mm, 35mm
ORWO	NP 3	32/16°	Fine grain panchromatic film suitable for outdoor and aerial scenes, also suitable for back projection. For amateur and professional use. Discontinued by 1968.	ORWO 1180	16mm, 35mm, 70mm
ORWO	NP 5	125/22°	Standard panchromatic film for motion picture use. Very sharp with wide latitude. Also was available to amateurs in 16mm format. Replaced by NP 55 in 1968. Discontinued by 1972.	ORWO 1180	16mm, 35mm, 70mm
ORWO	NP 55	80/20°	Improved version of ORWO NP 5 introduced around 1968.	ORWO 1180	16mm, 35mm
ORWO	NP 7	400/27°	High speed film suitable for artificial light but also harsher weather conditions. For amateur and professional use.	ORWO 1180	16mm, 35mm
ORWO	NP 71	400/27°	High speed film for slow-motion shots with high frame rate. For amateur and professional use. Discontinued by 1972.	ORWO 1180	16mm, 35mm
ORWO	NI 750	n/a	Infrared negative film with sensitivity up to 750-760 nm. Suitable for special effects. Discontinued for motion picture purposes by 1972.	ORWO 1180	35mm
ORWO	TF 5	n/a	Sound recording film. Discontinued by 1978.	ORWO 1180	16mm, 35mm
ORWO	TF 6	n/a	Originally introduced as "Agfa Tonnegativfilm TF 6". Sound recording film. Discontinued by 1972.	ORWO 1180	2×16mm, 16mm, 35mm
ORWO	TF 7	n/a	Sound recording film. Discontinued by 1978.	ORWO 1180	16mm, 35mm
ORWO	TF 8	n/a	Introduced circa 1978. Sound recording film with blue light sensitivity and steep gradation. Base has anti-reflection coloring.	ORWO 1180	2×16mm, 16mm, 35mm

==== Black and white positive films ====
Make	Name	Notes	Process	Formats
Discontinued films
Agfa	Positiv-Nitro-Film	Positive fine grain film on nitrate base from the late 1940s/early 1950s.	ORWO 1180	35mm
Agfa	Positiv-Feinkornfilm	See ORWO PF 1.	ORWO 1180	16mm, 35mm
ORWO	PF 1	Originally introduced as "Agfa Positiv-Feinkornfilm". Positive fine grain film, also suitable for recording title sequences. Discontinued by 1972.	ORWO 1180	2×8mm, 2×16mm, 8mm, 16mm, 35mm, 70mm
ORWO	PF 11	Similar properties as ORWO PF 1 and ORWO PF 2, has a thick base of 0,2 mm. Discontinued by 1968.	ORWO 1180	35mm
ORWO	PF 2	Positive fine grain film on a thin base. Slightly lower sensitivity than ORWO PF 1.	ORWO 1180	2×8mm, 2×8mm Super, 2×16mm, 4×8mm, 4×8mm Super, 8mm, 16mm, 35mm, 70mm
ORWO	PF 3	Positive fine grain film. Suitable for copies from negatives with steeper gradation.	ORWO 1180	2×8mm Super, 4×8mm, 4×8mm Super, 2×16mm, 16mm, 35mm
ORWO	PF 5	Positive fine grain film used for television copies with flat gradation.	ORWO 1180	16mm, 35mm
ORWO	PK 6	Film for copying title sequences with blue light sensitivity and steep gradation. Also suitable for title sequence recording. PK 6 was only produced on special orders.	ORWO 1180	n/a

==== Black and white duplicating films ====
Make	Name	Notes	Process	Formats
Discontinued films
Agfa	Dup-Negativfilm Typ A	See ORWO DN 1.	ORWO 1180	16mm, 35mm
Agfa	Dup-Positivfilm Typ D	See ORWO DP 1.	ORWO 1180	16mm, 35mm
ORWO	DN 1	Ultra fine grain film for making copies, inter-positives or sound track positives. Speed of ISO 1.2/2°. Blue light sensitivity and flat gradation.	ORWO 1180	4×8mm, 4×8mm Super, 2×16mm, 16mm, 35mm, 70mm
ORWO	DN 2	Ultra fine grain panchromatic film for making inter-negatives or black and white negatives from color positives. Sensitivity is 1,5 to 2 stops slower than ORWO DN 1.	ORWO 1180	4×8mm, 4×8mm Super, 2×16mm, 16mm, 35mm, 70mm
ORWO	DP 1	Ultra fine grain film for making inter-positives. Gray film base. Discontinued by 1972.	ORWO 1180	2×16mm, 16mm, 35mm, 70mm
ORWO	DP 2	Ultra fine grain film with flat gradation curve for making inter-positives. Sensitivity is 1 stop slower than ORWO DP 1.	ORWO 1180	2×16mm, 16mm, 35mm, 70mm
ORWO	DP 3	Ultra fine grain panchromatic film for making inter-positives. Also suitable for making positives from unmasked color negative films. Sensitivity is 0,3 stop slower than ORWO DP 1.	ORWO 1180	2×16mm, 16mm, 35mm, 70mm

==== Black and white television films ====
Make	Name	ISO	Notes	Process	Formats
Discontinued films
ORWO	UP 11	25/15°	Fine grain panchromatic reversal film suitable for daylight scenes. Discontinued by 1968.	ORWO 4105 / 4185	16mm
ORWO	UP 21	64/19°	Panchromatic reversal film suitable for scens with artificial light. Discontinued by 1968.	ORWO 4105 / 4185	16mm
ORWO	UP 31	100/21°	Fine grain panchromatic reversal film for daylight and artificial light. Flatter gradation than ORWO Fernseh-Umkehr-Film UP 21. Discontinued by 1968.	ORWO 4105 / 4185	16mm
ORWO	UP 32	100/21°	Universal television film for reportage. It could be developed either as a reversal film or as a negative film. Same EI for negative and reversal process. Wide exposure latitude and fine tonal gradation. Upon special order manufactured with magnetic sound track.	ORWO 4105 / 4185 or 1180	16mm
ORWO	UP 51	320/26°	Panchromatic reversal film for scenes with artificial light or in bad weather. Discontinued by 1968.	ORWO 4105 / 4185	16mm
ORWO	UP 52	320/26°	Universal television film. It could be developed either as a reversal film or as a negative film. Same EI for negative and reversal process. Upon special order manufactured with magnetic sound track.	ORWO 4105 / 4185 or 1180	16mm
ORWO	US 11	16/13°	Special film for recording television screens. Sensitivity tailored to light spectrum of a television screen. Could be developed as a negative or a positive. Discontinued by 1983.	ORWO 4105 / 4185 or 1180	16mm
ORWO	UX 1	12/12°	Very fine grain reversal film for making duplicates of positives. This film could be developed either as a negative or as a positive. Emulsion contains yellow dye to prevent halation. Also available for amateur use. Upon special order manufactured with magnetic sound track.	ORWO 4105 / 4185 or 1180	2×8, 16mm

==== Color negative films ====
Make	Name	ISO	Dates	Notes	Process	Formats
Discontinued films
Agfacolor	Negativfilm Typ B	16/13°	1947–1954	Unmasked color negative film for daylight. First improved film stock after 1945.	Agfa	?
Agfacolor	Negativfilm Typ G	16/13°	1947–1954	Unmasked color negative film for artificial light. First improved film stock after 1945.	Agfa	?
Agfacolor	Negativfilm Typ B 333	25/15°	1954–1962	Daylight-balanced unmasked color negative film. Replaced by Agfacolor Negativfilm Typ 432 in 1962.	ORWO 5180	16mm, 35mm
Agfacolor	Negativfilm Typ G 334	25/15°	1954–1962	Tungsten-balanced unmasked color negative film. Replaced by Agfacolor Negativfilm Typ 432 in 1962.	ORWO 5180	16mm, 35mm
Agfacolor	Negativfilm Typ 432	32/16°	1962–1964	See ORWOCOLOR NC 1.	ORWO 5180 / 5186	16mm, 35mm
ORWO COLOR	NC 1	32/16°	1964–1972	Introduced in 1962 as "Agfacolor Negativfilm Typ 432". Unmasked color negative motion picture film balanced for artificial light. Daylight exposure with ORWO filter K 14 and EI 25/15°. Wide exposure latitude and high sharpness. Gradation can be adjusted with development time (0,5 to 0,9).	ORWO 5180 / 5186	16mm, 35mm, 70mm
ORWO COLOR	NC 3	64/19°	1972–1991	Masked color negative motion picture film balanced for artificial light. Daylight exposure with ORWO filter K 14 and EI 50/18°. Based on ORWOCOLOR NC 19 Mask still film and similar properties as NC 1.	ORWO 5186 / 5188 / 5189	16mm, 35mm, 70mm
ORWO COLOR	XT 125	125/22°	1991–1992	Rebranded Agfacolor XT 125 stock. In 1992 replaced by XT 100.	ECN-2	35mm
ORWO COLOR	XT 320	320/26°	1991–1994	Rebranded Agfacolor XT 320 stock.	ECN-2	35mm
ORWO COLOR	XT 100	100/21°	1992–1994	Rebranded Agfacolor XT 100 stock.	ECN-2	35mm

==== Color positive films ====
Make	Name	Dates	Notes	Process	Formats
Discontinued films
Agfacolor	Positivfilm Typ 4	1947–c1962	Positive film with improved yellow couplers.	Agfa	35mm
Agfacolor	Positivfilm Typ 5	1952–1964	See ORWOCOLOR PC 5.	ORWO 7180	16mm, 35mm
Agfacolor	Positivfilm Typ 6	1955–1956	Positive film with steeper gradation than Positivfilm Typ 5. Sound track re-development not possible.	ORWO 7180	?
Agfacolor	Positivfilm Typ 7	1956–1964	See ORWOCOLOR PC 7.	ORWO 7180	16mm, 35mm
ORWO COLOR	PC 5	1964–c1968	Introduced as "Agfacolor Positivfilm Typ 5". Positive color film for making positive copies from negatives and duplicate negatives. First film on the market with possibility of sound track re-development.	ORWO 7180	2×8mm, 16mm, 2×16mm, 35mm, 70mm
ORWO COLOR	PC 51	1964–c1968	Similar properties as ORWOCOLOR PC 5, has a thick base of 0,2mm. Suitable for back projection.	ORWO 7180	35mm
ORWO COLOR	PC 7	1964–1991	Introduced as "Agfacolor Positivfilm Typ 7". Positive color film for making copies from flat graduated masked and unmasked negatives. In 1965 re-introduced with improved formulation.	ORWO 7180 / 7181 / 7182	2×8mm, 16mm, 2×16mm, 35mm, 70mm
ORWO COLOR	PC 9	1964–c1970	Positive color film for making demonstration prints from masked negatives or unmasked negatives. Improved sharpness due to reversed layer order. Also suitable for back projection.	ORWO 7180 / 7181	2×8mm, 16mm, 2×16mm, 35mm, 70mm
ORWO COLOR	PC 11	c1973	Trial production. Likely never marketed.	ORWO	n/a
ORWO COLOR	PC 12	1980–1991	Positive film with reversed layers for making of positive copies from 8mm and 16mm color negatives.	ORWO 7182	2×8mm, 16mm, 2×16mm, 4×8mm Super, 35mm
ORWO COLOR	PC 13	c1982	Trial production of film with anti-static layer and hydrophobic couplers. Likely never marketed.	ORWO	n/a
ORWO COLOR	PC 15	1987–1990	Trial production of film with oil-protected couplers compatible with ECP-2 process. Likely never marketed.	ECP-2	n/a

==== Color duplicating films ====
Make	Name	Dates	Notes	Process	Formats
Discontinued films
Agfacolor	Umkehr-Dup-Negativfilm	1949–1954	First color duplicating film on the market. Used for duplicating negatives using single-stage copying.	Agfa	35mm
Agfacolor	Umkehr-Dupfilm M	1954–1964	See ORWOCOLOR DC 1.	Agfa	16mm, 35mm
ORWO COLOR	DC 1	1964–1965	Introduced as "Agfacolor Umkehr-Dupfilm M". First Wolfen film to incorporate masking. Film for making duplicate negatives using the reversal process.	ORWO	2×16mm, 16mm, 35mm, 70mm
ORWO COLOR	DC 2	1965–c1983	Double masked color duplicating film for making positive copies of positives using reversal development. Discontinued by 1983.	ORWO 9181	2×16mm, 16mm, 35mm, 70mm
ORWO COLOR	DC 6	1968–c1983	Introduced in 1968. Double masked color duplicating film for two-stage copying. Discontinued by 1983.	ORWO 7186	2×16mm, 16mm, 35mm, 70mm

==== Color television films ====
Make	Name	ISO	Dates	Notes	Process	Formats
Discontinued films
ORWO CHROM	UK 3	64/19°	1978–1989	Color reversal television film balanced for artificial light (3200K).	ORWO 9186	16mm
ORWO CHROM	UK 31	125/22°	1987–1990	Color reversal television film balanced for artificial light (3200K) with higher speed. Gradation tailored to television purposes.	ORWO 9187	16mm
ORWO CHROM	UF 1	n/a	1973–1985	Film for making positive copies of positives. Gradation adjusted for television scanning. Replaced by UF 11 by 1987.	ORWO 9186	16mm
ORWO CHROM	UF 11	n/a	1985–1990	Color reversal copy film based on UK 3. Finer grain compared to UF 1. Increased copying speed due to higher sensitivity.	ORWO 9186	16mm

== Slavich ==
Slavich is a Russian film manufacturer. They no longer produce motion picture film but do still produce photographic emulsion paper.

- Black-and-white negative film NK-2 ISO/GOST 32D/25T
- Black-and-white negative NK-2Sh ISO/GOST 100D/80T
- Black-and-white positive print film МZ-3 ISO/GOST ~5T

== Svema ==
Svema was a Soviet/Ukrainian film manufacturer.

=== Consumer black and white reversal films ===
Make	Name	ISO	Notes	Formats
Discontinued films
Svema	ОЧ-45 (OCh-45)	50/18°	Black and white reversal film for amateur use.	Super 8, 2×8, DS 8, 16mm
Svema	ОЧ-90 (OCh-90)	100/21°	Black and white reversal film for amateur use.	2×8, DS 8, 16mm
Svema	ОЧ-180 (OCh-180)	200/24°	Black and white reversal film for amateur use.	Super 8, 2×8, DS 8, 16mm
Svema	ОЧ-50 (OCh-50)	50/18°	Black and white reversal film for amateur use.	1×8, 1×Super 8, Super 8, 2×8, DS 8, 16mm

=== Consumer color reversal films ===
Make	Name	ISO	Notes	Formats
Discontinued films
Svema	ЦО-32Д (CO-32D)	40/17°	Daylight balanced color reversal film for amateur use.	1×8, 1×Super 8, Super 8, DS 8, 16mm
Svema	ЦО-50Д (CO-50D)	50/18°	Daylight balanced color reversal film for amateur use.	1×Super 8, Super 8, DS 8, 16mm

=== Black and white films ===
Make	Name	ISO	Notes	Formats
Discontinued films
Svema	КН-1 (KN-1)	20/14°	Black and white negative film for motion pictures. In artificial light film should be rated at ISO 12/12°.	16mm, 35mm
Svema	КН-2 (KN-2)	50/18°	Black and white negative film for motion pictures.	16mm, 35mm
Svema	КН-3 (KN-3)	80/20°	Black and white negative film for motion pictures.	16mm, 35mm
Svema	КН-4С (KN-4S)	500/28°	Black and white negative film for motion pictures.	16mm, 35mm
Svema	НК-2Ш (NK-2Sh)	100/21°	Black and white negative film for motion pictures.	16mm, 35mm
Svema	А-2Ш (A-2Sh)	400/27°	Black and white negative film for motion pictures.	16mm, 35mm
Svema	К3-63 (K3-63)	n/a	Sound recording film.	16mm, 35mm
Svema	МЗ-3 (MZ-3)	2,5/5°	Film for making positive motion picture prints.	16mm, 35mm

=== Black and white television films ===
Make	Name	ISO	Notes	Formats
Discontinued films
Svema	ОЧ-Т-45 (OCh-T-45)	50/18°	Black and white reversal film for television.	16mm
Svema	ОЧ-Т-180 (OCh-T-180)	200/24°	Black and white reversal film for television.	16mm
Svema	ОЧ-Т-В (OCh-T-V)	400/27°	Black and white reversal film for television.	16mm
Svema	ОЧ-Т-Н (OCh-T-N)	3/6°	Black and white television film for making copies of reversal films.	16mm

=== Color negative films ===
Make	Name	ISO	Dates	Notes	Formats
Discontinued films
Factory No. 3	ДС-1 (DS-1)	20/14°	1948–c1956	Unmasked color negative film balanced for daylight. Produced at Agfa Wolfen in 1946-1947. 16 GOST (old).	35mm
Factory No. 3	ЛН-1 (LN-1)	20/14°	1948–c1956	Unmasked color negative film balanced for artificial light. Produced at Agfa Wolfen in 1946-1947. 16 GOST (old).	35mm
Factory No. 3	ДС-2 (DS-2)	50/18°	1956–1960	Unmasked color negative film for daylight. 45 GOST (old).	35mm
Factory No. 3	ЛН-2 (LN-2)	50/18°	1956–1960	Unmasked color negative film for artificial light. 45 GOST (old).	35mm
Factory No. 3 / Svema	ДС-3 (DS-3)	40/17°	1960–?	Unmasked color negative film for daylight. 32 GOST (old).	35mm
Factory No. 3 / Svema	ЛН-3 (LN-3)	40/17°	1960–1980	Unmasked color negative film for artificial light. 32 GOST (old).	35mm
Factory No. 3 / Svema	ДС-4 (DS-4)	50/18°	1962–1980	Unmasked color negative film for daylight. 45 GOST (old).	35mm
Factory No. 3 / Svema	ДС-5М (DS-5M)	40/17°	1963–?	Masked color negative motion picture film for daylight. 32 GOST (old).	16mm, 35mm
Factory No. 3 / Svema	ЛН-5М (LN-5M)	40/17°	1963–1970	Masked color negative film for artificial light. 32 GOST (old).	35mm
Svema	ЛН-6М (LN-6M)	?	1970–1974	Masked color negative film for artificial light.	35mm
Svema	ЛН-7 (LN-7)	80/20°	1974–1975	Color negative film for artificial light. 65 GOST (old).	35mm
Svema	ЛН-8 (LN-8)	100/21°	1975–?	Color negative film for artificial light. 90 GOST (old).	35mm
Svema	ЛН-9 (LN-9)	100/21°	?–?	Masked color negative film for artificial light.	16mm, 35mm

=== Color positive films ===
Make	Name	Notes	Formats
Discontinued films
Factory No. 3	ЦП (CP)	Introduced in 1948. First color copy film based on Agfacolor.	35mm
Svema	ЦП-8Р (CP-8R)	Color film for making positive motion picture prints.	16mm, 35mm
Svema	ЦП-10 (CP-10)	Color positive film with "displaced layers".	16mm, 35mm
Svema	ЦП-11 (CP-11)	Color positive film with "displaced layers". Triple sensitivity compared to CP-10.	16mm, 35mm

=== Color duplicating films ===
Make	Name	Notes	Formats
Discontinued films
Svema	КП-6 (KP-6)	Color copy film.	16mm, 35mm
Svema	КПМ (KPM)	Color copy film.	16mm, 35mm

=== Color television films ===
Make	Name	ISO	Notes	Formats
Discontinued films
Svema	ЦО-Т-22Д (CO-T-22D)	25/15°	Introduced in 1974. Daylight balanced color reversal film for television.	16mm
Svema	ЦО-Т-90ЛМ (CO-T-90LM)	100/21°	Introduced in 1972. Tungsten balanced color reversal film for television.	16mm
Svema	ЦО-Т-180Л (CO-T-180L)	200/24°	Tungsten balanced color reversal film for television.	16mm
Svema	ЦО-5 (CO-5)	n/a	Fine grain film for making copies of color reversal films.	16mm

== Tasma ==
Tasma is a Russian company (Russian: Тасма), located in the Russian Republic of Tatarstan.

=== Consumer black and white reversal films ===
Make	Name	ISO	Notes	Formats
Discontinued films
Kazan / Tasma	ОЧ-180 (OCh-180)	200/24°	High speed black and white reversal film.	2×8, 16mm
Tasma	ОЧ-50 (OCh-50)	50/18°	Black and white reversal film for amateur use.	16mm
Tasma	ОЧ-200 (OCh-200)	200/24°	Black and white reversal film for amateur use.	16mm

=== Consumer color reversal films ===
Make	Name	ISO	Notes	Formats
Discontinued films
Kazan	ЦО-1 (CO-1)	25/15°	Fine grain color reversal film.	2×8
Tasma	ЦО-22 (CO-22)	25/15°	Fine grain color reversal film.	16mm
Tasma	ЦО-25 (CO-25)	25/15°	Fine grain color reversal film.	16mm

=== Black and white films ===
- NK-1 – ISO/GOST 250D/200T
- NK-2 – ISO/GOST 100D/80T
- NK-3 – ISO/GOST 32D/25T

== See also ==
- List of photographic films
- List of discontinued photographic films
- 135 film
- 16 mm film
- 35 mm movie film
- Color motion picture film
- Film base
- Film stock
- List of motion picture film formats
