= Ilford XP =

XP2 Super
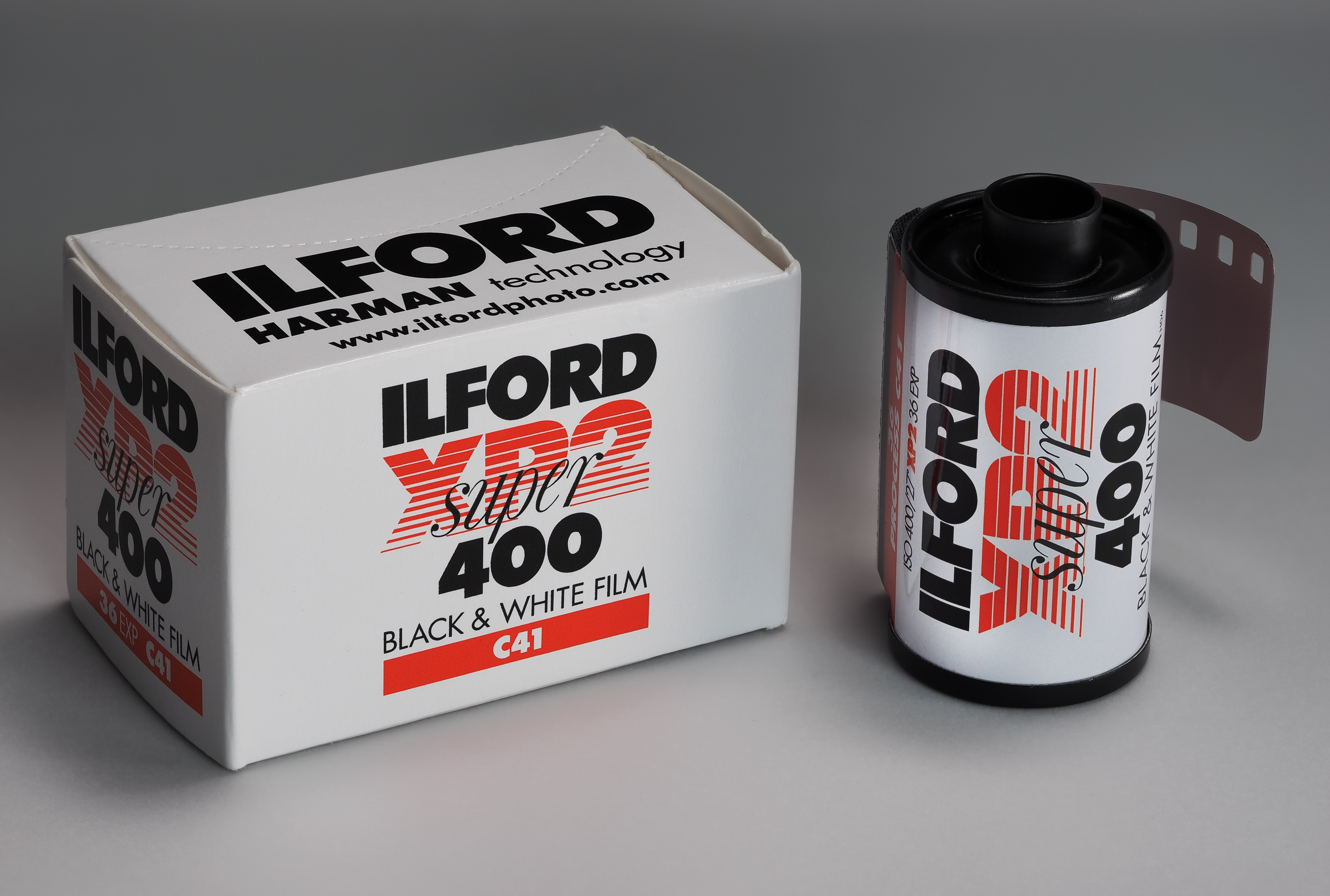
- Maker: Ilford Photo
- Speed: 400/27°
- Type: B&W print
- Process: Chromogenic
- Format: 35mm, 120, disposable camera
- Exposure latitude: EI 50/18° – 800/30°
- Application: General
- Introduced: 1998

XP is a chromogenic black-and-white film from Ilford Photo. It was launched to great acclaim at photokina in September 1980, and went on sale in January, 1981. It has since progressed through a number of versions, with XP2 Super being the latest. The main competitor of Ilford XP2 Super was Kodak BW400CN, which was discontinued in 2014. As of 2020, Ilford XP2 Super is the only black & white film on the market that can be developed using the C-41 process.

As a chromogenic film, XP2 can scan well because it avoids the limitations of Digital ICE, plus it has a similar exposure latitude to color negative film, so it can be exposed with an exposure index from ISO 50/18° to 800/30° on a single roll and be developed in traditional C-41 processing.

In 2013, Ilford introduced a version of their black-and-white single-use camera which includes 27 exposures of XP2 Super film.
