= FP4 =

FP4 may refer to:

- FP4 plus, an Ilford FP black-and-white photographic film
- Fourth Framework Programme (FP4), one of the EU Framework Programmes for Research and Technological Development
- FP4, a Roland Corporation electric piano
- Fairphone 4, a smartphone
- FP4, a 4-bit minifloat numeric representation used in machine learning

== See also ==
- McQuesten Airport (TC LID: CFP4), Yukon, Canada
