= Ilford Photo =

British photographic materials company

Harman Technology, trading as Ilford Photo
- Type: Limited
- Industry: Photography
- Founded: 1879; 147 years ago
- Founders: Alfred Hugh Harman
- Headquarters: Knutsford, Cheshire, United Kingdom
- Area served: Worldwide
- Products: Film, paper, chemicals
- Website: www.harmantechnology.com www.ilfordphoto.com

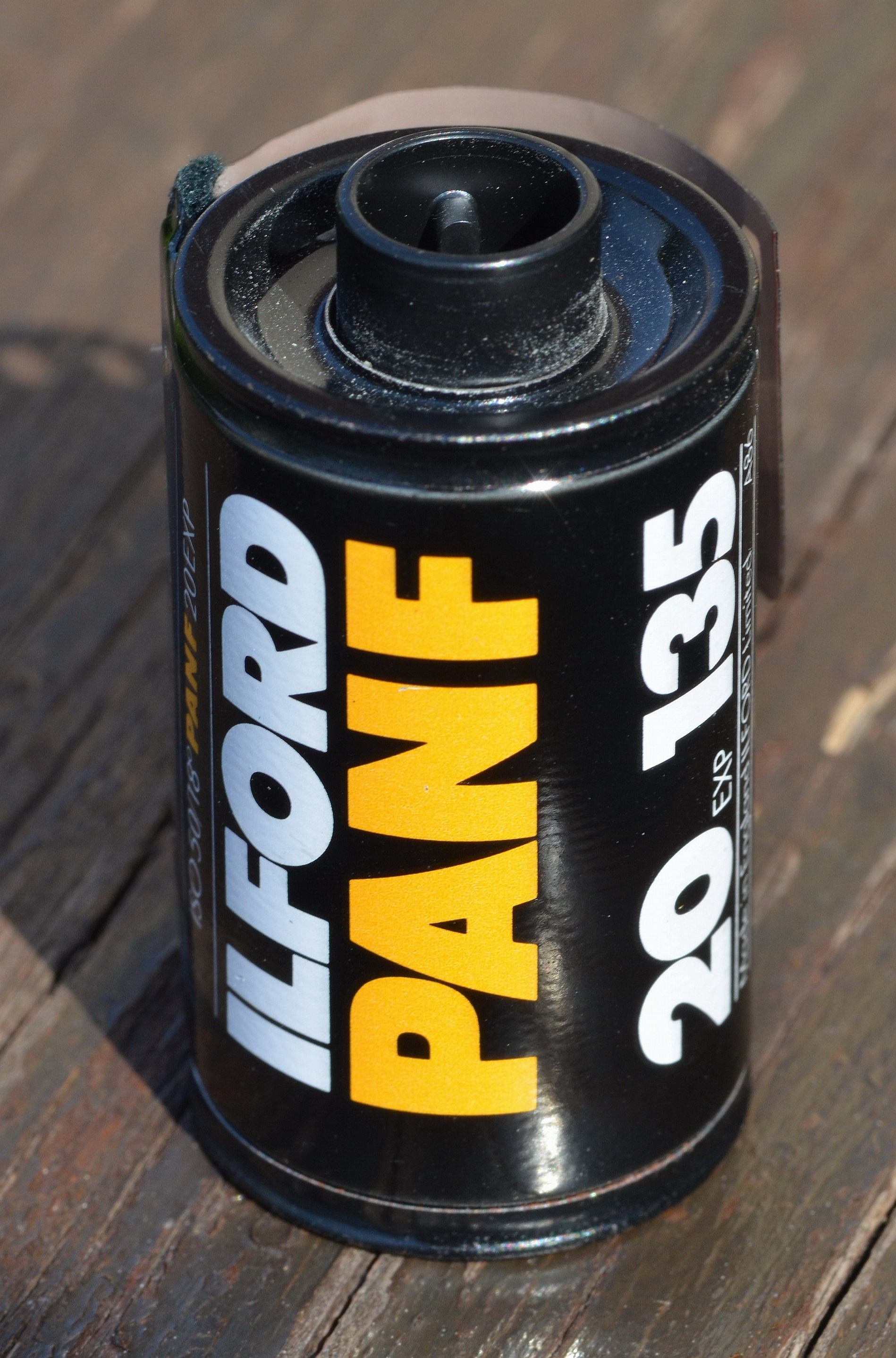
Ilford PAN F Black & white film

Harman Technology Limited, trading as Ilford Photo, is a British manufacturer of photographic materials best known for its Ilford branded black-and-white film, papers and chemicals and other analog photography supplies. Historically it also published the Ilford Manual of Photography, a comprehensive manual of everything photographic, including the optics, physics and chemistry of photography, along with recipes for many developers.

Under the ownership of the industrial conglomerate ICI in the 1960s, the company produced a range of Ilfochrome (Cibachrome) and Ilfocolor colour printing materials at a new plant in Switzerland developed in partnership with the Swiss company CIBA-Geigy, which later acquired ICI's shares. By the 2000s, as the British-Swiss company Ilford Imaging, the decline of the film market saw the UK company in receivership by 2004, but rescued by a management buy-out, Harman Technology Ltd, which today continues the production of traditional colour and black-and-white photographic products, under the Ilford, Kentmere and Harman brands.

The Swiss arm of Ilford Imaging was also bankrupt by 2013 and the Ilford brand is now owned by Ilford Imaging Europe GmbH, who apply it to a range of inkjet papers, a disposable colour film camera, and a colour film. Harman Technology holds license rights to the Ilford brand for its black-and-white photographic materials, but other than a common heritage there is now no connection between the two companies.

== History ==
=== Britannia Works ===
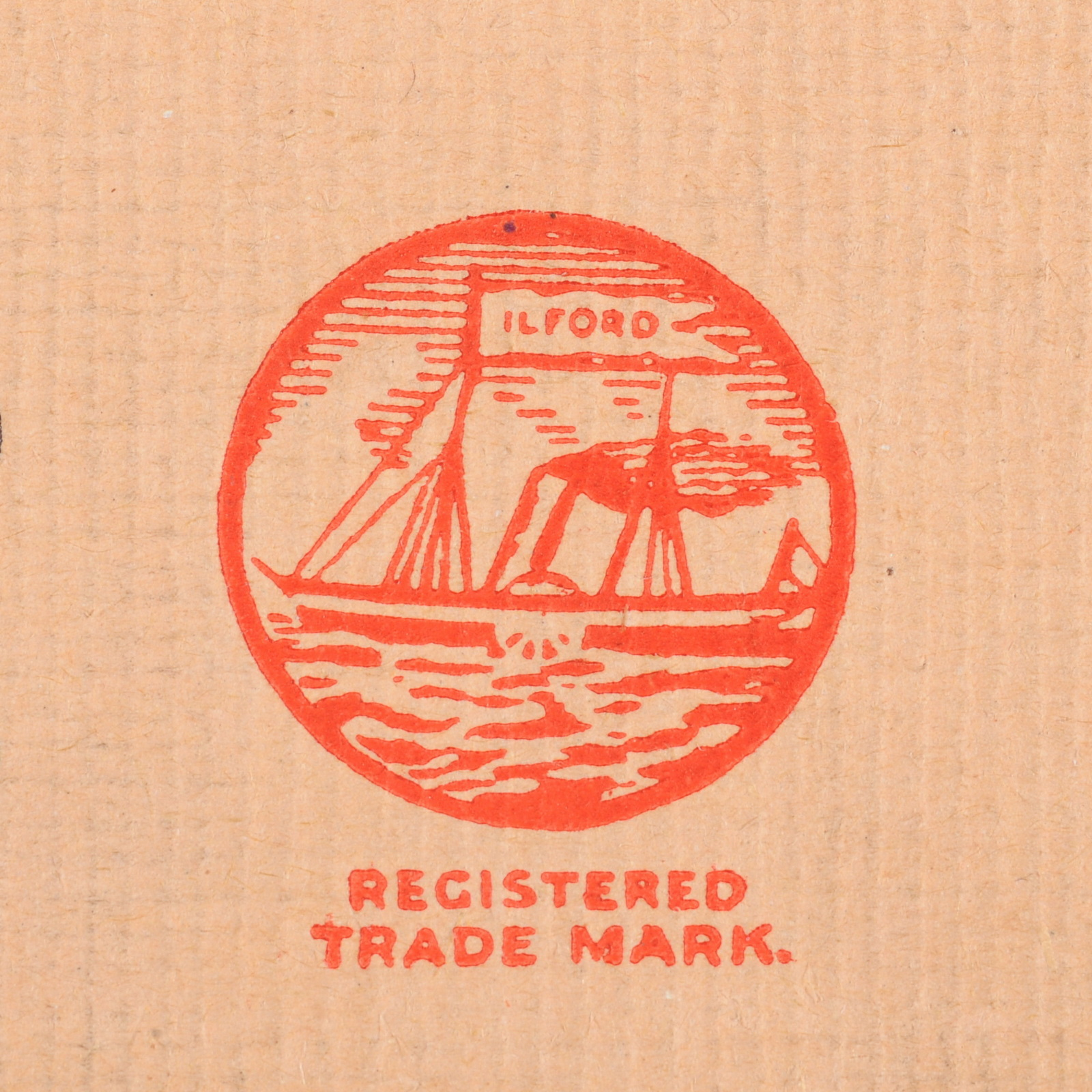
Logo of Ilford Ltd. from 1930s

The company was founded in 1879 by Alfred Hugh Harman as Britannia Works, which became the Britannia Works Company in 1886. It was renamed Britannia Works Company Limited in December 1891. Initially making photographic plates, it grew to occupy a large site in the centre of Ilford.

=== Ilford, Limited ===
In 1901, it took the name of the town to become Ilford Limited, which was disputed by the local council. The matter was settled by placing a comma between the word Ilford and Limited, giving Ilford, Limited; the comma was finally removed in 1951.

Production of roll films commenced in 1912 and the Mobberley (Rajar) factory was acquired in 1928. In 1903 Ilford Ltd., manufacturers of photographic dry-plates, extended their operations to Warley, Brentwood. The company acquired a 14-acre site, adjacent to Woodman Road and planned to provide employment for 350 people. The works were enlarged in later years, and in the mid 1920s the branch became Selo Ltd, with a major new manufacturing site developed on the site, known locally as "Selo Works". The marketing name Selo, for roll films, first appeared in 1930.

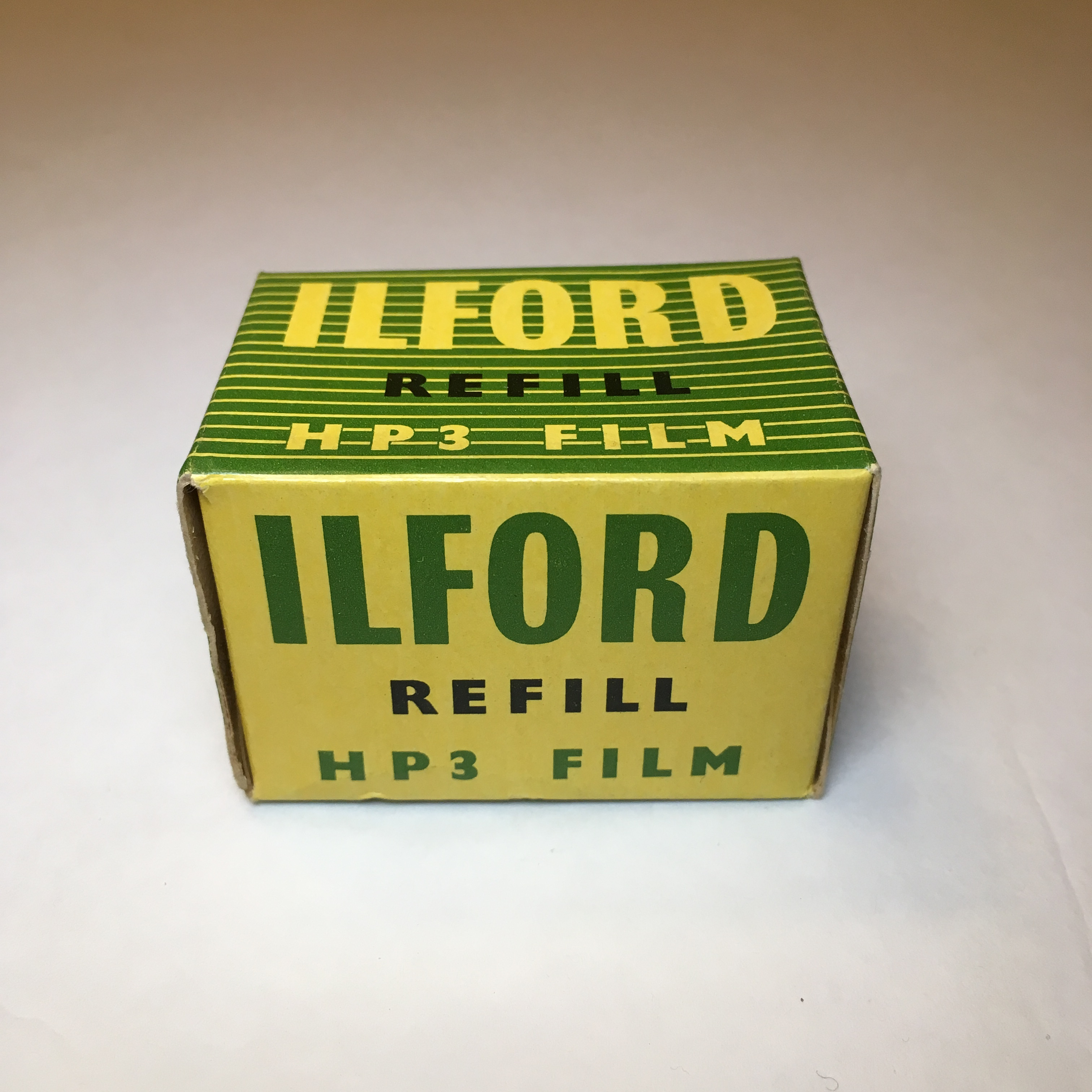
Box of 35mm Ilford film – expired: September 1957

Selection of Ilford products at Redbridge Museum

In 1959, ICI acquired a majority share holding in Ilford. In 1963 Ciba AG, Switzerland, which had bought Lumiere, France, the preceding year, and which already owned Swiss photographic coating company Tellko, began to acquire shares in Ilford as part of a commercial co-operation between Ciba and Ilford to develop Ciba's dye-bleach print material for making prints directly from colour transparencies. Originally called Cilchrome ('Cil' derived from the names Ciba, Ilford and Lumière) the eventual product name was Cibachrome.

Ciba built a new plant in Marly, Switzerland, to coat Cibachrome, renamed Ilfochrome in 1992 after Ciba withdrew use of its name. The old Tellko factory nearby in the centre of Fribourg was used as the finishing department.

In 1969 Ciba acquired all ICI shares in Ilford to become sole owner of Ilford Limited. A year later Ciba merged with JR Geigy to become Ciba-Geigy. The factory at Roden Road was closed in 1976, with the company moving to new facilities at Basildon, Essex. In 1983, its UK headquarters was moved to Mobberley, Cheshire.

=== Ilford Anitec ===
In 1989, Ciba-Geigy sold Ilford to USA-based International Paper company, also owners of graphic arts materials manufacturer Anitec. The two companies were merged in 1990 to become Ilford Anitec. In 1996, the sales and administration offices were also moved from London to Mobberley. In the same year, the Selo Works site, in Brentwood, was closed and sold off for housing development.

=== Ilford Imaging ===
In 1997 Ilford Anitec was sold on to Doughty Hanson & Co a British private equity fund manager and subsequently rebranded Ilford Imaging. In 2002 plans were announced to redevelop the original part of the factory (the former Rajar works) for housing to release funds to re-invest in the business, with the houses subsequently built in 2004–07.

On 20 August 2004, after earlier that year celebrating 125 years of photographic manufacture, the UK company, Ilford Imaging UK Ltd, went into receivership with debts of £40m. The Swiss manufacturing site and distribution companies was put up for sale as a going concern.

The Swiss part of the company; Ilford Imaging Switzerland GmbH, and the plant at Marly was bought by the Oji Paper Company of Japan in July 2005. It produced inkjet products and high quality colour photographic products. It was subsequently sold onto Paradigm Global Partners LLP in May 2010 before being declared bankrupt on 9 December 2013 resulting in the closure of the Marly plant.

The Ilford Imaging and Ilford brand and trademarks (but not the Marly plant) was acquired by a joint venture of Australian firm CR Kennedy & Company Pty Ltd and the Japan-based Chugai Photo Chemical Company, named Ilford Imaging Europe GmbH and now based in Germany. The Galerie range of inkjet papers was relaunched in August 2014. The company holds the rights to the Ilford trademark for photographic applications but otherwise has no connection to Ilford Photo.

The Marly site is now Marly Innovation Centre with alternative uses found for the original buildings. In 2015 Fotoimpex, owner of the ADOX photographic brand and a small scale photographic factory outside Berlin acquired use of the former Ilford Imaging (Ciba Geigy) machine E, medium scale coating line at Marly, with the intention to begin coating ADOX film there in 2018.

=== Harman Technology ===
==== 2004–2015 ====
The UK site was subject to a management buyout by six former managers of Ilford Imaging UK Limited, which resulted in the formation of Harman Technology Ltd (named after Ilford's founder Alfred Harman) in February 2005. The company, now trading as Ilford Photo, produced high quality monochrome photographic products. The Ilford brand was retained by Ilford Imaging Europe GmbH and used under licence by Ilford Photo for its existing film products. To finance the purchase, the Mobberley factory site was sold to Isola Investments Ltd, a wholly owned subsidiary of the Perviaz Naviede Family Trust with Ilford Photo remaining as tenant.

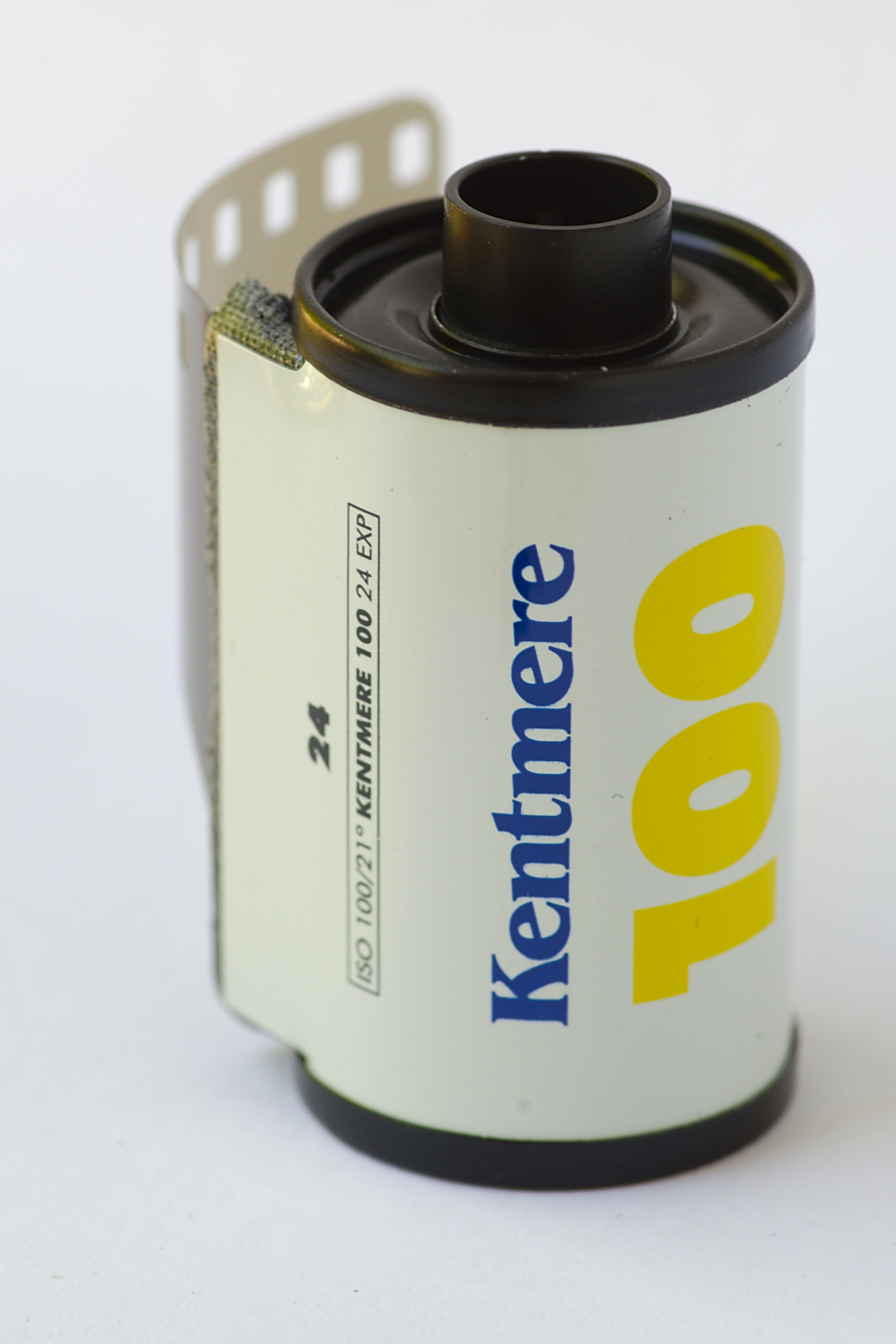
A roll of Kentmere 100 black-and-white negative film in 135 format

In 2007, Harman Technology acquired Kentmere Photographic Ltd, a manufacturer of photographic paper in Kentmere, Lake District. Production moved to Mobberley and in 2009 two new classic grain black-and-white films were added under the Kentmere brand. Originally designed as a lower-priced brand to its Ilford offer to compete in the US market they are now available worldwide with the Kentmere brand particularly aimed at the student market and those new to black-and-white photography. Harman also contract manufactures similar black-and-white films for other brands including AgfaPhoto (APX), Rollei (RPX) and Oriental (Seagull).

In 2012, the company invested £350,000 in a 35mm film cassette making plant, it had acquired from Ferrania, bringing production back in house after relying on external suppliers for 50 years to provide long term surety of supply. The company was also noted as having an 80% share of the black-and-white photographic market.

In 2014, land owners of the 40-acre Mobberley site submitted a planning application to Cheshire East Council to construct 375 homes on the majority of the site including investment to consolidate Ilford Photo operations onto a smaller 7.5 acre campus within the site. The application was refused and an appeal was made to the planning inspectorate in July 2015. Following a public inquiry in 2016, the appeal was rejected.

==== 2015–present ====
On 14 September 2015, 10 years on from the original management buy-out, Ilford Photo announced that Harman Technology Limited had been acquired by Pemberstone Ventures Ltd.

In 2017 the Ilford Lab Direct service, operating from the factory site in the UK was re-named Harman Lab.

In May 2018, the company announced a refresh of its existing Ilford film packaging, with Kentmere film packaging refreshed in September 2018. Both sets of packaging now feature a contrasting Harman Technology sub branding. In December 2018, it launched Simplicity a new range of black-and-white developing chemicals packed in small sachets, designed to process 2x135 or 1x120 format films to improve convenience for new or low volume users.

In 2019 Ilford celebrated its 140th year with a Silver Ticket Competition; one winning ticket for a factory tour and photographic course being hidden in a 140th anniversary film box and in October the announcement of a number of new products following a teaser campaign on social media. This included Ilford Multigrade V RC Deluxe photographic paper available in Glossy, Pearl and Satin finishes, Ortho Plus film in 135 and 120 formats, an Ilford and Paterson film processing starter kit and a Harman reusable camera supplied with two 35mm Kentmere Pan 400 films.

In 2021 Harman introduced the EZ-35 35mm motorised film camera with a fixed focus 31mm, f/11 lens packaged with a roll of HP5 plus.

In 2022, the company added 120 medium format to its Kentmere 100 and 400 film ranges.

In October 2023, Harman commenced a viral marketing campaign, for a new product, which was revealed at the launch in California, US on 1 December 2023 to be an experimental 35mm colour negative film; 'Harman Phoenix 200' which was developed and manufactured in house over 12 months. The film is high contrast and lacks an anti-halation layer. Due to most default scanner settings being determined with the colour balance of the more common Kodak or Fujifilm emulsions in mind, this film requires adjustment to scanning settings in order to achieve "normal" colour balance.

== Harman products ==
=== Colour Film ===
- Harman Phoenix 200
- Harman Phoenix II 200
- Harman RED 125
- Harman Switch Azure 125

=== Paper ===
Direct Positive

- HARMAN Direct Positive – FB Glossy
- HARMAN Direct Positive – RC Glossy & Luster

=== Inkjet papers ===
- Harman Professional Crystal Jet Elite

=== Chemicals ===
- Harman Warmtone Developer
- Harman Selenium Toner

=== Cameras ===
- Obscura Pinhole Camera
- Harman Titan Pinhole Camera
- Harman HP5+ Single Use Camera
- Harman XP2 Single Use Camera
- Harman reusable Camera with 2 Kentmere Pan 400 films (from 2019)
- Harman EZ 35 motorised film camera with HP5 plus (from 2021)

== Ilford products ==
=== Film ===
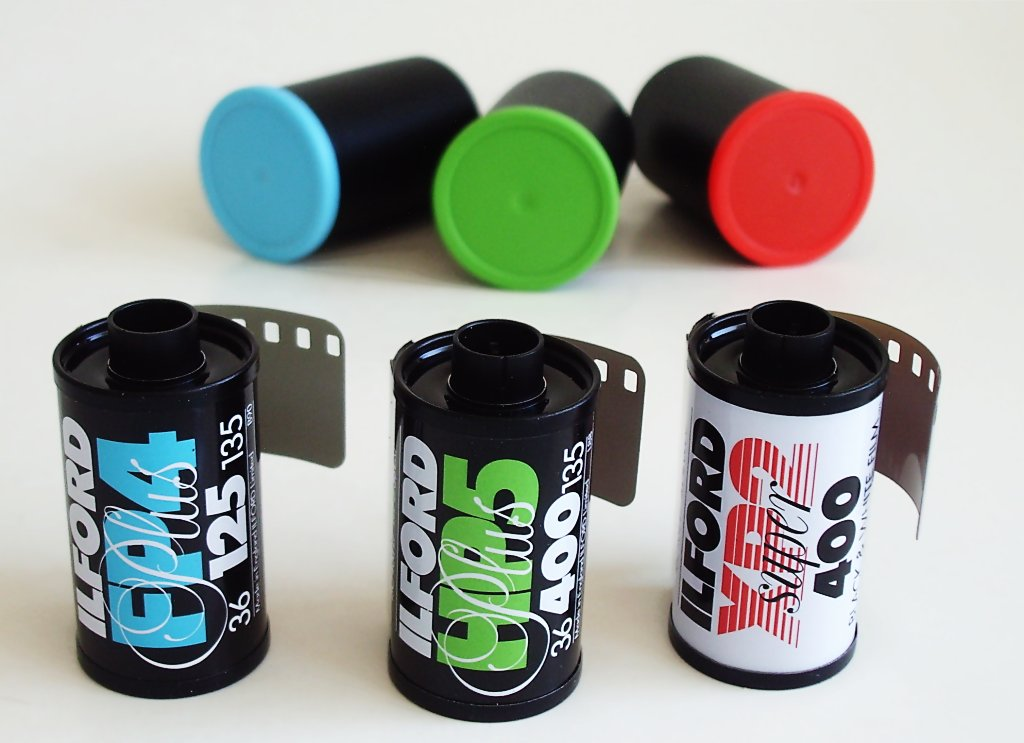
Some Ilford black-and-white films

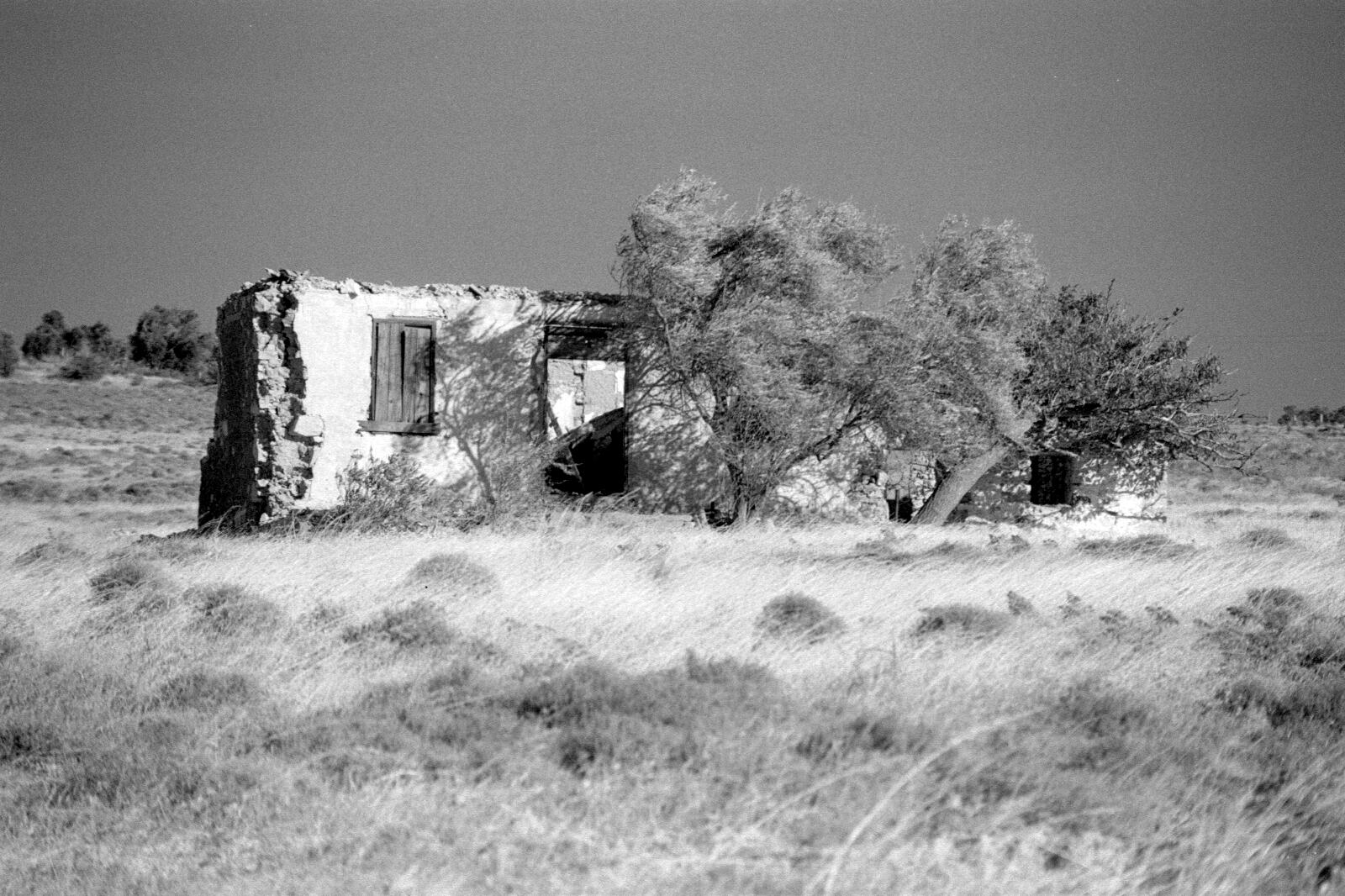
Near infrared photograph taken with Ilford SFX-200 film

- Pan F Plus 50
- FP4 Plus 125
- HP5 Plus 400
- Delta 100, 400, and 3200
- XP2 Super 400
- SFX 200
- Ortho Plus 80

Consumer grade, selected markets

- Ilford PAN 100
- Ilford PAN 400

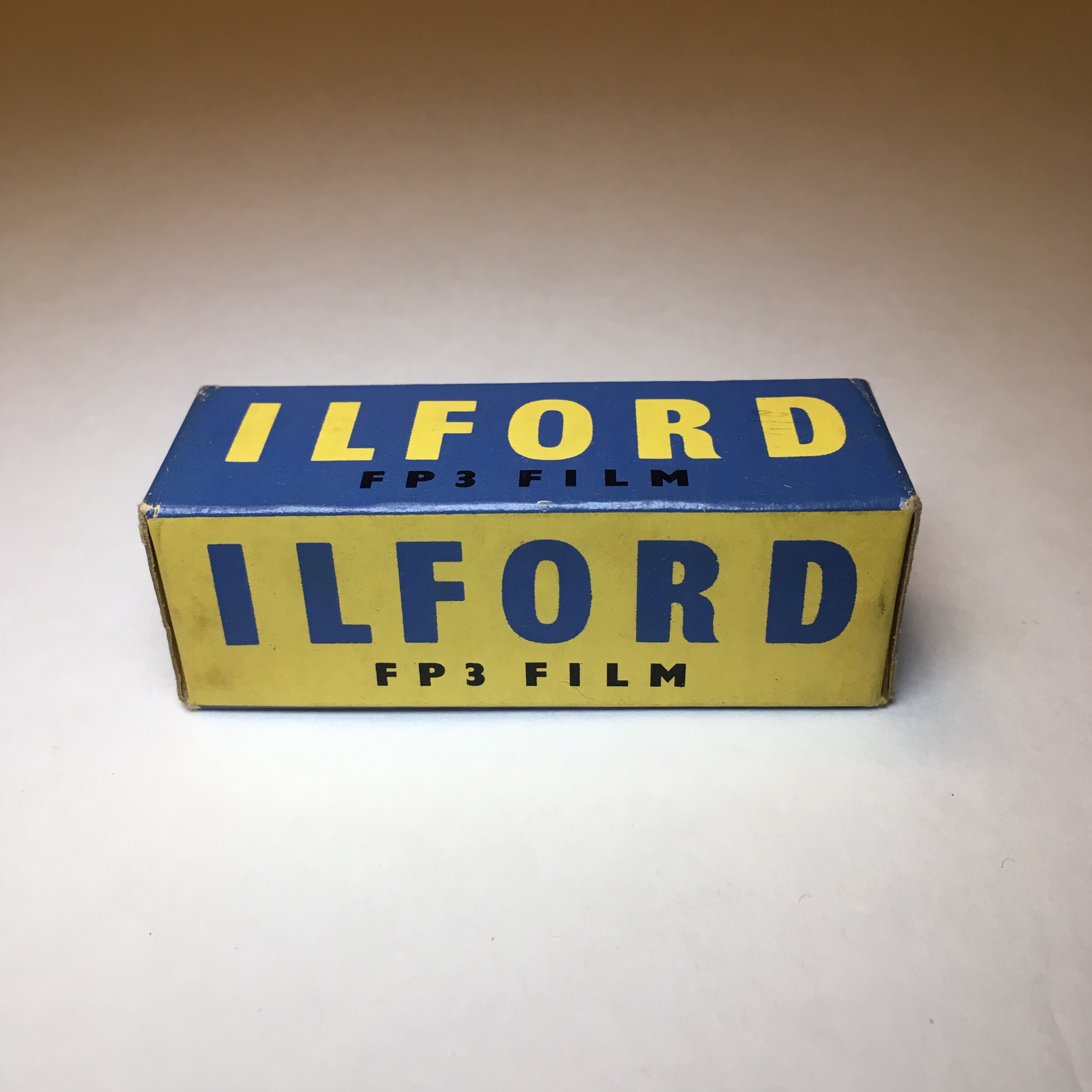
Box of 120 Ilford film – expired: September 1955

=== Film developers ===
- ID-11
- Ilfosol 3
- Ilfotec DD
- Ilfotec DD-X,
- Ilfotec HC
- Ilfotec LC 29
- Ilfotec RT Rapid
- Microphen
- Perceptol
- Phenisol
- Simplicity Developer

=== Fixers, toners and other chemicals ===
- Hypam fixer
- Ilford 2000 RT Fixer and Rapid Fixer
- Ilfostop
- Ilfotol wetting agent
- Ilford Washaid
- Simplicity Stop
- Simplicity Fix

=== Other ===
- Ilford + Paterson film processing starter kit

=== Paper ===
Graded

- Ilfospeed RC Deluxe Grades 2 & 3
- Ilfobrom Galerie FB Grade 3

Variable contrast

- Multigrade V RC Deluxe (2019)
- Multigrade V RC Portfolio (2021)
- Multigrade RC Cooltone
- Multigrade RC Warmtone
- Multigrade RC Express
- Multigrade FB Art 300 (Rag base)
- Multigrade FB Classic (Replaces Multigrade IV FB, Dec 2013)
- Multigrade FB Cooltone (new, Dec 2013)
- Multigrade FB Warmtone

Digital Panchromatic

- Ilfospeed RC Digital

=== Paper developers ===
- Bromophen
- Ilford 2150 XL and 2000 RT
- Multigrade developer
- PQ Universal

=== Specialist products ===
- Lab Paper
- Nuclear emulsions
- L4 Plates
- Q plates
- Process control

== Kentmere products ==
=== Film ===
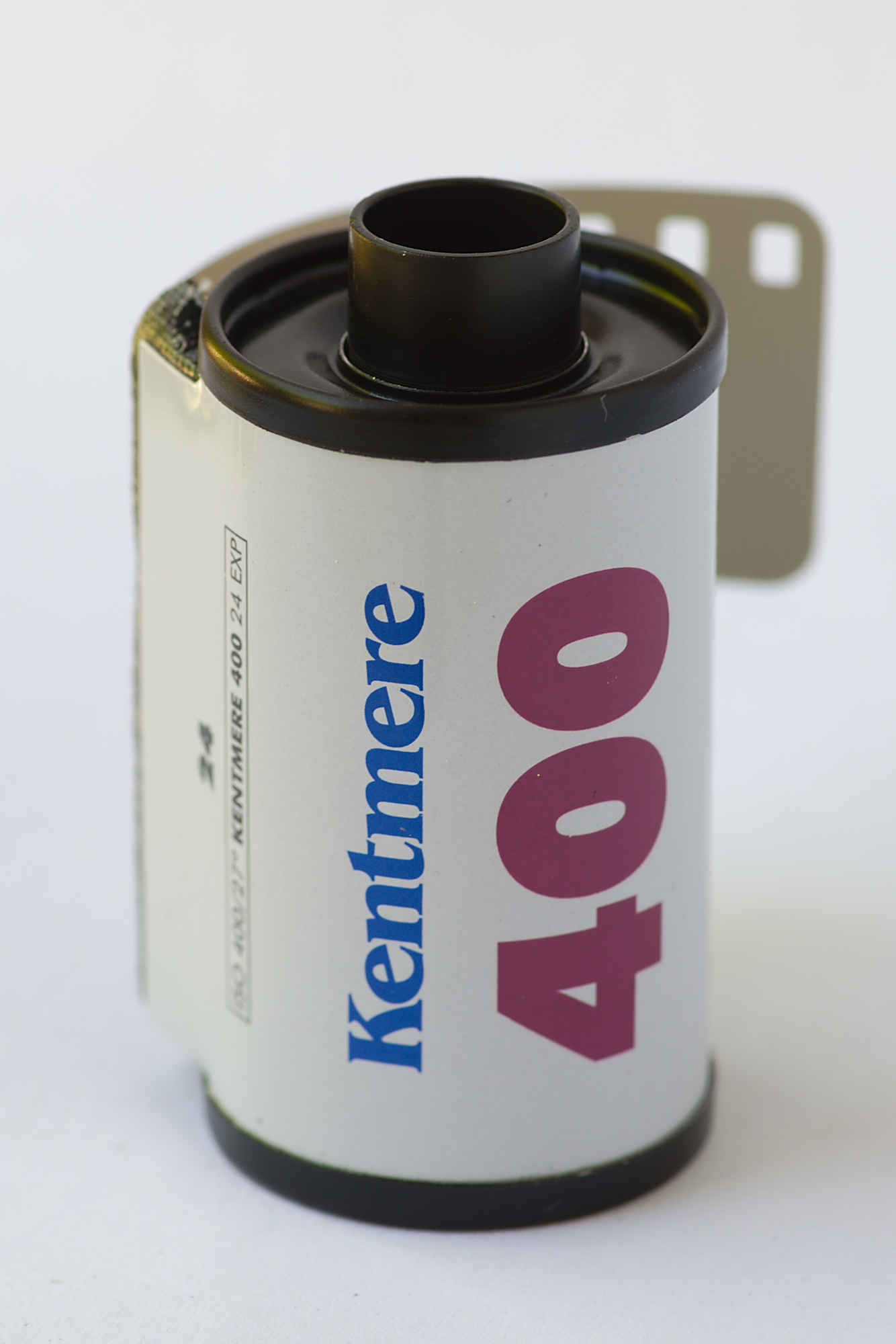
A roll of Kentmere 400 black-and-white negative film in 135 format

- Kentmere Pan 100 (named Kentmere 100 until late 2018)
- Kentmere Pan 400 (named Kentmere 400 until late 2018)
- Kentmere Pan 200

=== Paper ===
Variable contrast

- Kentmere VC Select Lustre
- Kentmere VC Select Glossy

== Discontinued products ==
=== Cameras ===
Ilford sold a number of cameras under its own name but made for it by other manufacturers, starting with a box camera in 1902, but most were made in the 1940s and 50s. The Ilford Witness was a rangefinder camera with interchangeable lenses announced in 1947, but not released until 1953 because of manufacturing difficulties; there is an example shown in Science Museum Collections. In the meantime, the simpler Advocate series 1 was released in 1949 and series 2 in 1952. A pre-release Advocate series 1 camera was given to Princess Elizabeth in 1948; it was unique in having an ivory enamel finish. It was stolen, but later recovered when it was sent to be repaired. Also released in 1949 was the Craftsman, a twin-lens reflex (TLR) which took 120 or 620 film. Then 1951 saw the Prentice folding camera which also took 120 film.

In 1957, Ilford released the Sportsman, a rebranded West German Dacora Dignette, as a lightly built and cheap 35 mm camera to compete with the better made and more expensive Kodak Retinette. In Germany, a comparable Dignette was about half the price of a Retinette, both coming from the Stuttgart. The Sportsman became a series of camera models produced over the following 10 years, including the Super Sporti camera in 1960 . In 1958 Ilford released the Monobar, a monorail camera manufactured by Kennedy Instruments with a 35 mm back that resembled the earlier Advocate camera which KI had also manufactured. The Monobar allowed the front (lens) and rear (film plane) of the camera to be moved and rotated, bringing the scheimpflug principle to the 35mm world.

=== Film ===
- Surveillance film
- Traffic surveillance film
- Cine film

== XP2 Super development ==
Unlike most other black-and-white films, XP2 Super is processed in the same chemicals as colour print film (colour C41 process). It produces a monochrome negative, despite the development process.

== Custom film sizing ==
Whilst Ilford offers its film products in a wide range of common film formats; including 135, 120 and sheet film sizes, there are many more historic sizes that are no longer regularly produced. To assist photographers and artists requiring these and other sizes, since 2005 Ilford Photo has organised via select retailers an annual ultra large, custom and specialist format ordering scheme, similar to a group buying scheme. Customers orders are placed in advance and if there is sufficient demand for a film product to justify conversion to that size the orders are fulfilled.

== Lab services ==
In January 2008, the Ilford Process and Print Service (formerly Ilford Premium Direct) was brought in-house to the manufacturing site in Mobberley, Cheshire, UK. the following year Ilford Photo re-launched the in-house black-and-white lab service as Ilford Lab Direct. The mail order service offers black-and-white film processing and silver gelatin printing from film or from digital files. The launch saw the introduction of a dedicated website

The service has continued to expand offering medium and large format processing and digital black-and-white Lightjet prints.

In 2009, Ilford Lab Direct was awarded a Gold Award by Digital Photo magazine as Best online Black-and-White Printer.

In August 2013 Ilford Lab Direct US was launched, operating from California, US and offering a similar service to the UK operation.

In 2017 the service was renamed Harman Lab and now trades under this name.

== See also ==
- Photographic film
- List of photographic films
- List of discontinued photographic films
- Photographic paper
- Darkroom
- The Ilford Manual of Photography
