= Ilford Manual of Photography =

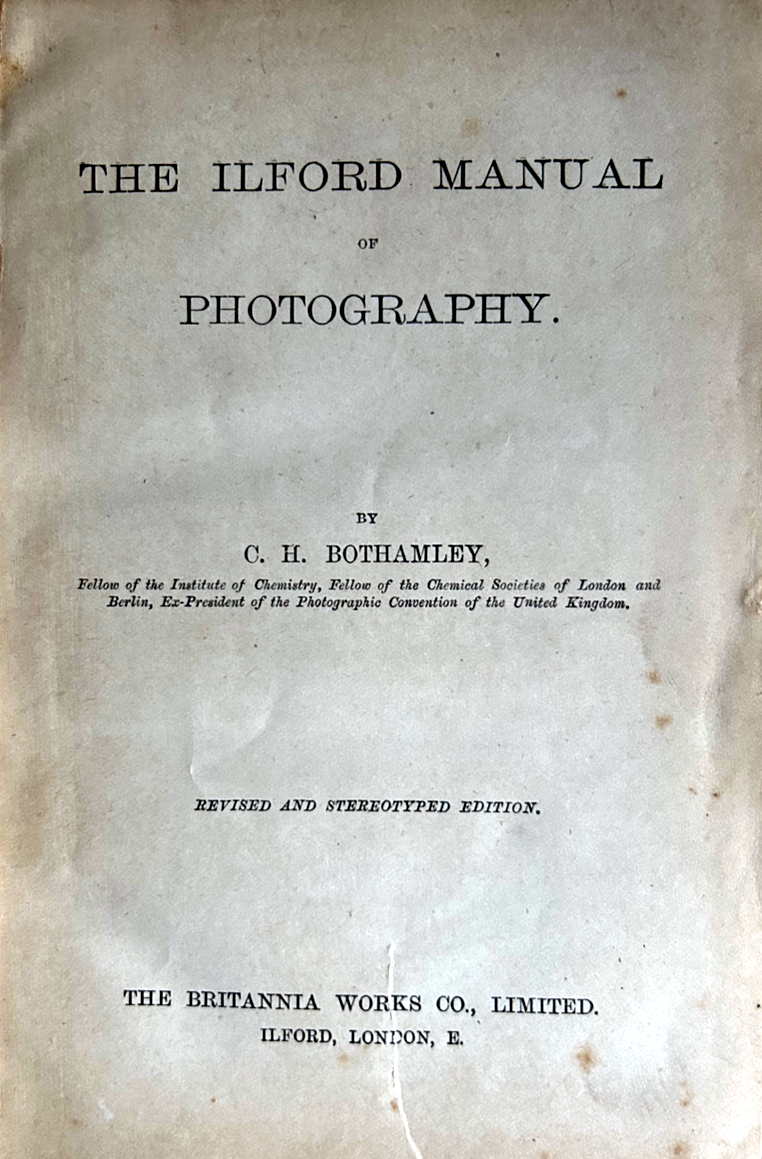
- Author: C.H. Bothamley
- Subject: Photography
- Publisher: Britannia Works Co.
- Publication date: 1890

The Ilford Manual of Photography is a comprehensive manual of photography, originally authored by C.H. Bothamley and first published in 1890 by the Britannia Works Company, which became Ilford, Limited in 1901. The 1890 edition was revised by Bothamley many times over a period of forty years until the first multi-authored edition, edited by George E. Brown, was published in 1935. The Manual is still in print, now named The Manual of Photography.

The earlier editions covered what we now call analog photography. Each featured technical information about optics, chemistry, and printing, which were described in depth. The Ilford Manual quickly became the staple technical book for the professional or serious amateur photographer. It remained so for some time, and with each new edition further information was added so that it might remain relevant.

The ninth edition was the first to include chapters on the newly emerging field of digital photography. The tenth edition is heavily revised and rewritten to include digital topics such as image sensors, digital printing, file formats, image workflow, colour management systems, image processing and compression.

The Ilford Manual of Photography is comparable in many ways to Ansel Adams' books - Camera and Lens, The Negative, The Print, Natural Light Photography and Artificial Light Photography - in its logical description of exposing plates and film, developing the negative, printing from negatives and lighting.

== Editions ==
=== The Ilford Manual of Photography ===
- 1890: Britannia Works, 1st edition and later revisions. Author: C. H. Bothamley.
- 1935: Ilford, 1st multi-authored edition. Editor: George E. Brown.
- 1942: Ilford, 2nd multi-authored edition. Editor: James Mitchell.
- 1944: Ilford, 3rd multi-authored edition. Editor: James Mitchell.
- 1949: Ilford, 4th multi-authored edition. Editor: James Mitchell.
- 1958: Ilford, 5th multi-authored edition. Editor: Alan Horder.

=== The Manual of Photography ===
- 1971: Focal Press, 6th multi-authored edition. Editor: Alan Horder.
- 1978: Focal Press, 7th multi-authored edition. Editor: Ralph E. Jacobson.
- 1988: Focal Press, 8th multi-authored edition. Editor: Ralph E. Jacobson.
- 2000: Focal Press, 9th multi-authored edition. Editor: Ralph E. Jacobson.
- 2009: Focal Press, 10th multi-authored edition. Editors: Elizabeth Allen and Sophie Triantaphillidou.
