= Ilford SFX =

SFX
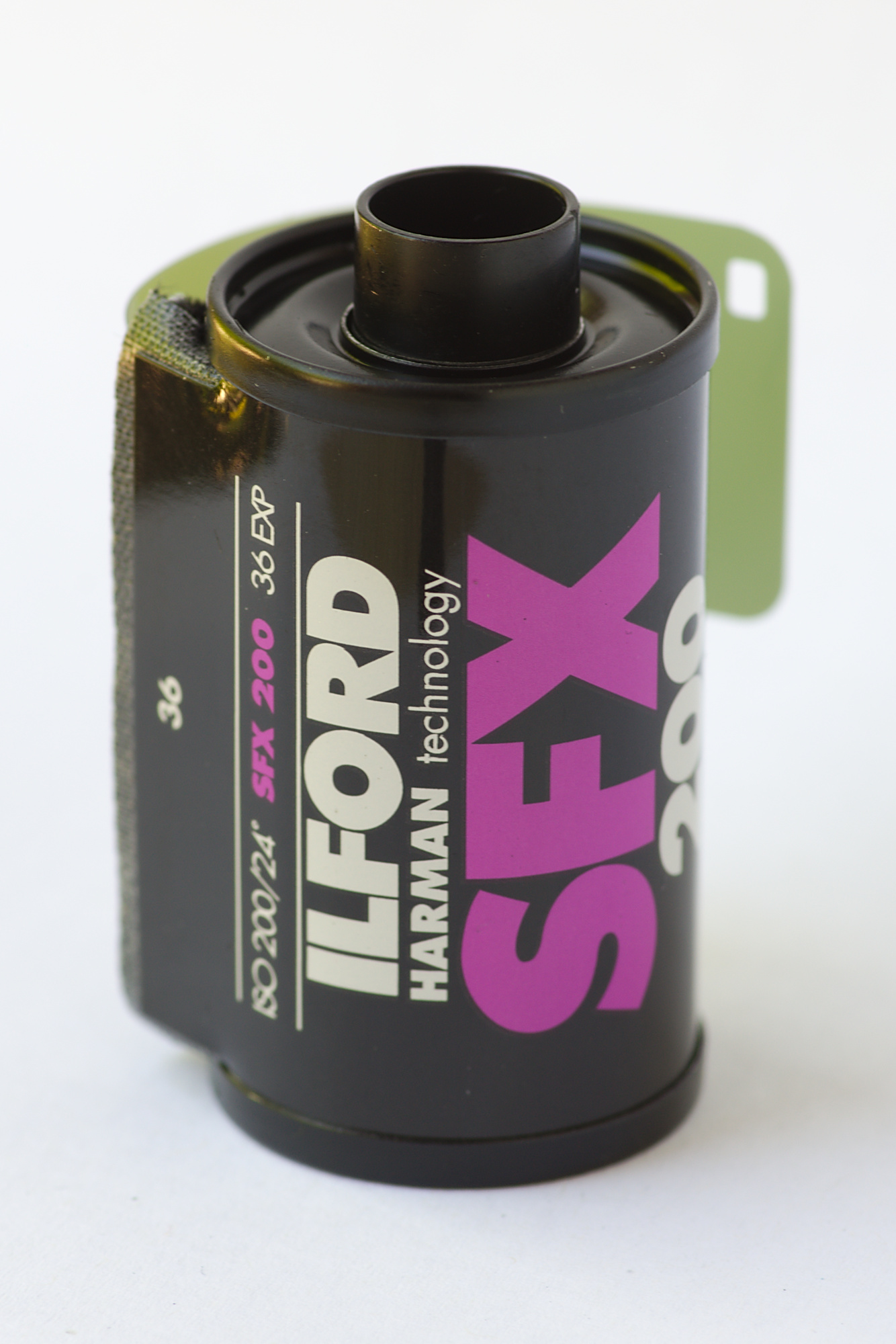
- Maker: Ilford Photo
- Speed: 200/24°
- Type: B&W print
- Process: Gelatin-silver
- Format: 35mm, 120
- Application: Creative photography, architecture

SFX is a black-and-white film from Ilford Photo with extended sensitivity into the near-infrared at 740 nm. It can be used as a panchromatic film on its own, or with different red/infrared filters to give varying levels of the effect seen in infrared photography; i.e. dark skies and bright plant foliage. Ilford makes a 'deep red' filter specifically for this film, but others can be used as well.

SFX was discontinued when Ilford went into receivership in 2004 as it is a niche product. On 26 January 2007, Ilford announced it would relaunch the film and it was relaunched in March 2007.

The film will be produced on what Ilford calls a 'manufacture on demand' (MOD) basis because of its low demand. With this relaunch, the Ilford product line-up is restored to its pre-receivership state.
