= Ilford FP =

FP4 plus
- Maker: Ilford Photo
- Speed: 125/22°
- Type: B&W print
- Process: Gelatin-silver
- Format: 35mm, 120, sheets
- Application: General
- Introduced: 1990

FP4
- Speed: 125 ASA
- Type: B&W
- Introduced: 1968
- Discontinued: 1990
- Replaced by: FP4 plus

FP3
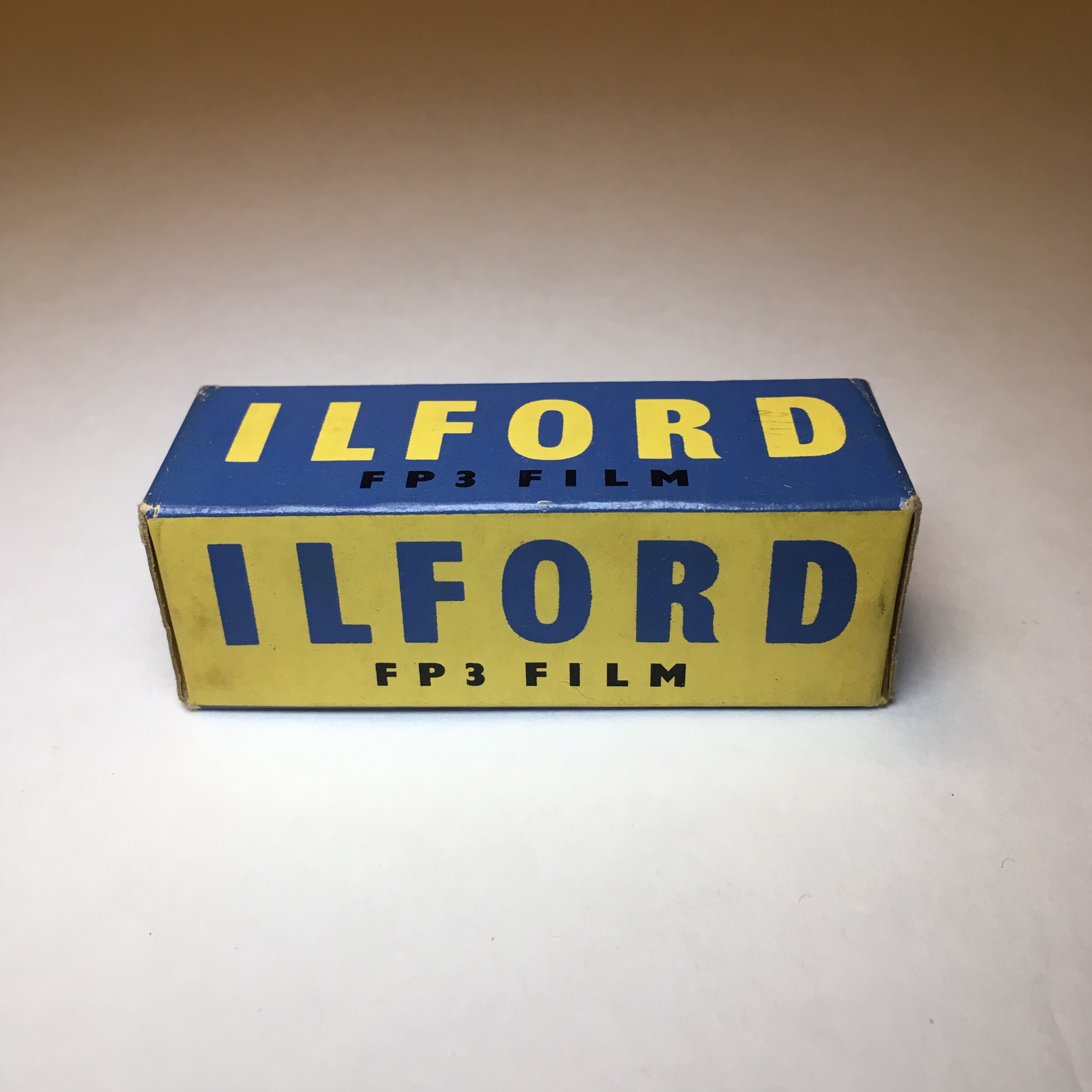
- Speed: 64 ASA, 125 ASA (1960)
- Type: B&W
- Introduced: 1942
- Discontinued: 1968
- Replaced by: FP4

FP2
- Speed: 40 ASA
- Type: B&W
- Introduced: 1939
- Discontinued: 1942
- Replaced by: FP3

FP
- Speed: 40 ASA
- Type: B&W
- Introduced: 1935
- Discontinued: 1939
- Replaced by: FP2

FP is a cubic-grain black-and-white film from Ilford Photo with a long history. It originated as Fine grain Panchromatic roll film in 1935. Like its faster partner product, HP film, it has gone through a number of versions since then, with the latest being FP4 plus (FP4+ for short).

The film is known for being versatile, with usable results even when underexposed two stops or overexposed six stops. This is due to the fact that FP4 features a double layer emulsion. It combines a layer of low sensitivity fine grain particles and a high sensitivity larger grained layer. This kind of film was already known in the 1920s and 1930s (e.g. Agfa Isopan F 17/10° DIN). Being perfect for the amateur's 6x9 roll film cameras these old types lacked sharpness in the 24 x 36 mm format due to the overall thickness of both layers. But the FP4 of 1968 combined an amateur-friendly double layer emulsion with the sharpness of a typical thin layer emulsion. This was possible because both layers together were only 7.5 μm thick.
