= Ilford HP =

Type of photographic film

HP5 plus
- Maker: Ilford Photo
- Speed: 400/27°
- Push: 3200/36°
- Type: B&W print
- Process: Gelatin-silver
- Format: 35mm, 120, sheets, disposable camera
- Application: General
- Introduced: 1989

HP5
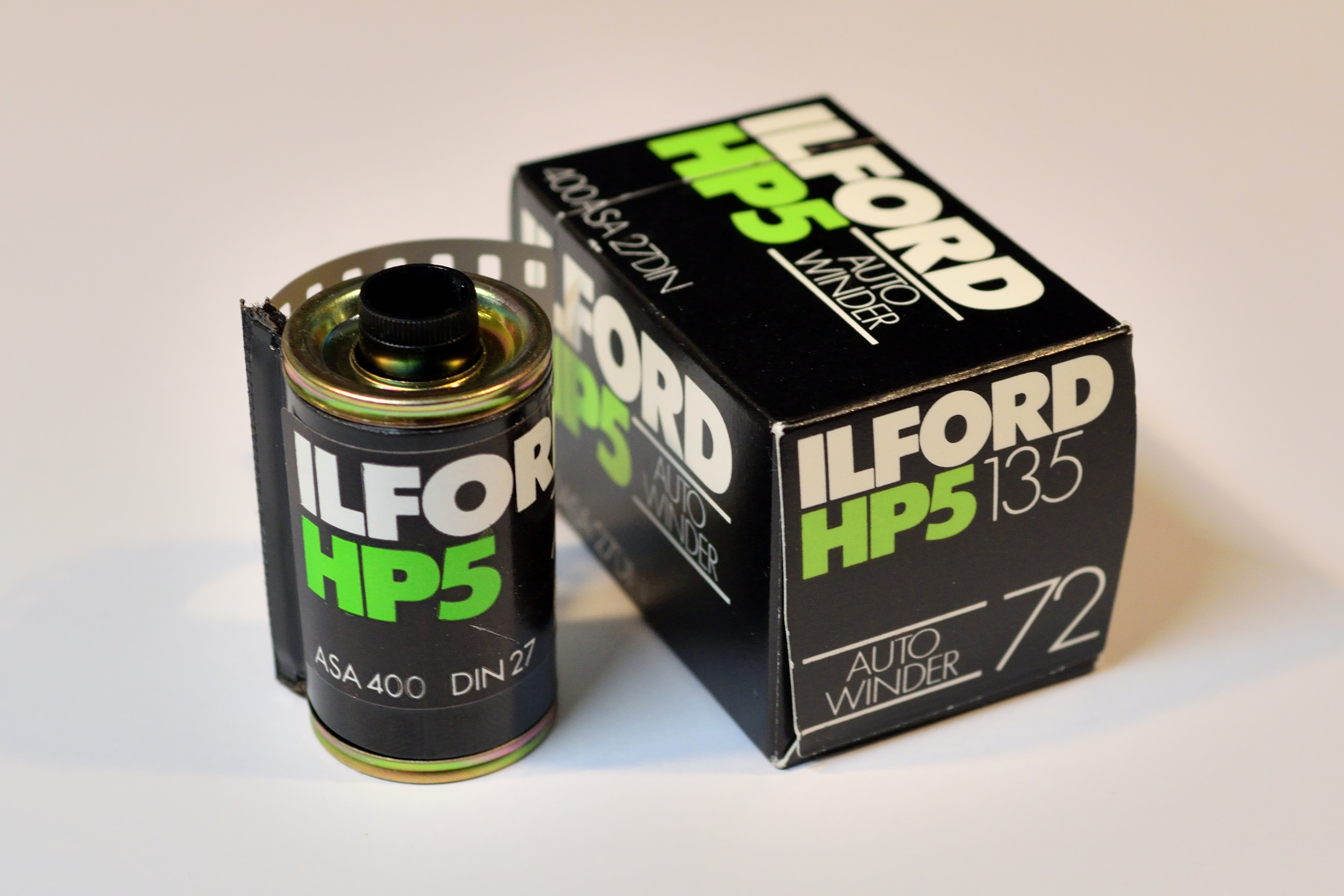
- Speed: 400/27°
- Type: B&W
- Introduced: 1976
- Discontinued: 1989
- Replaced by: HP5 plus

HP4
- Speed: 400/27°
- Type: B&W
- Introduced: 1965
- Discontinued: 1976
- Replaced by: HP5

HPS
- Speed: 400/27°, 800/30° (1960)
- Type: B&W
- Grain: coarse
- Introduced: 1954
- Discontinued: 1998
- Replaced by: Delta 3200

HP3
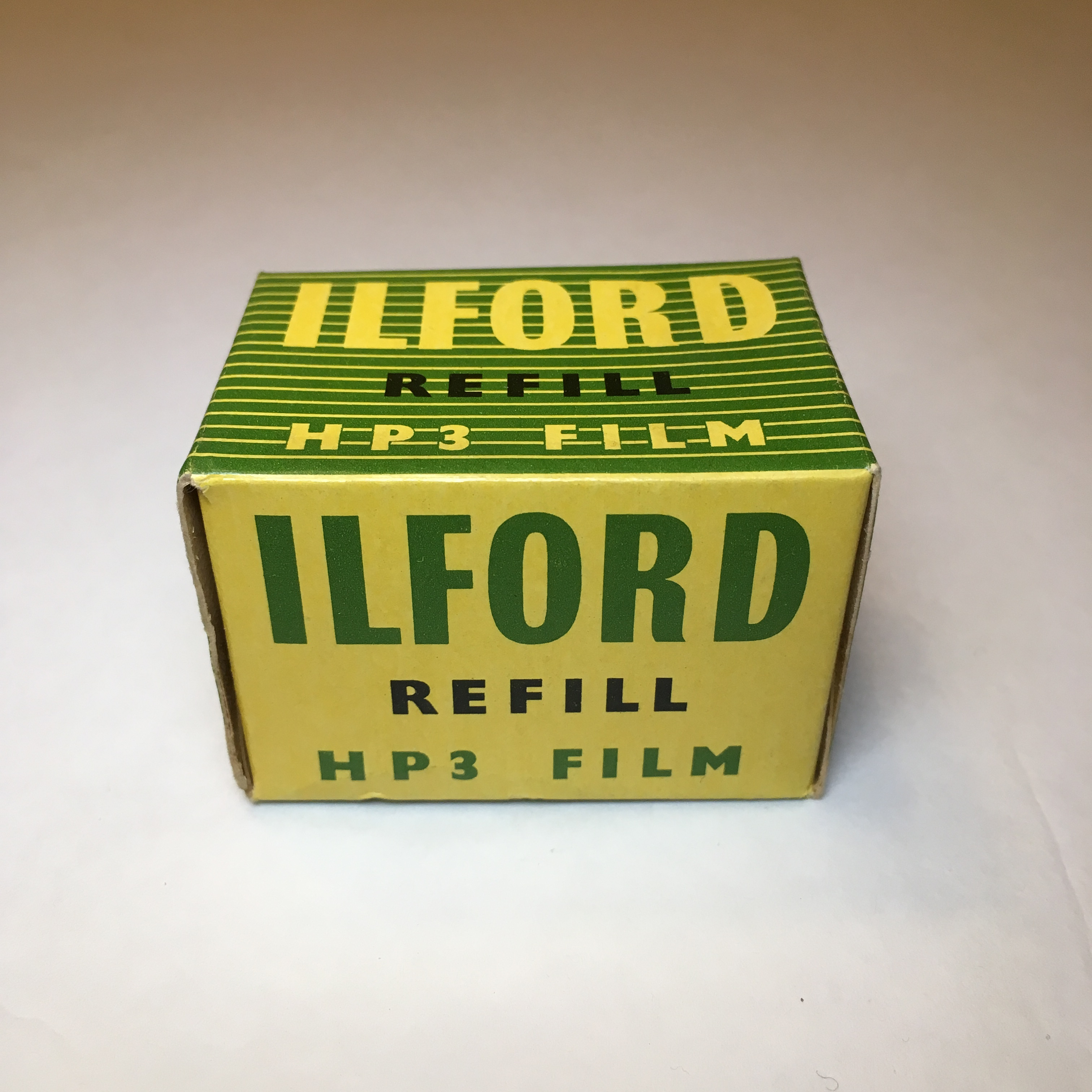
- Speed: 125/22°, 200/24° (1955), 400/27° (1960)
- Type: B&W
- Introduced: 1941
- Discontinued: 1969
- Replaced by: HP4

HP2
- Speed: 100/21°
- Type: B&W
- Introduced: 1939
- Discontinued: 1941
- Replaced by: HP3

HP
- Speed: 100/21°
- Type: B&W
- Introduced: 1935
- Discontinued: 1939
- Replaced by: HP2

HP is a cubic-grain black-and-white film from Ilford Photo with a long history. It originated as Hypersensitive Panchromatic plates in 1931. Since then it has progressed through a number of versions, with HP5 plus (HP5+ for short) being the latest. The main competitor of Ilford HP5 Plus is Kodak Tri-X 400.

On September 23, 2005, Ilford reintroduced its black-and-white single-use camera which includes 27 exposures of HP5 plus film.
