= Disposable camera =

Single-use film camera

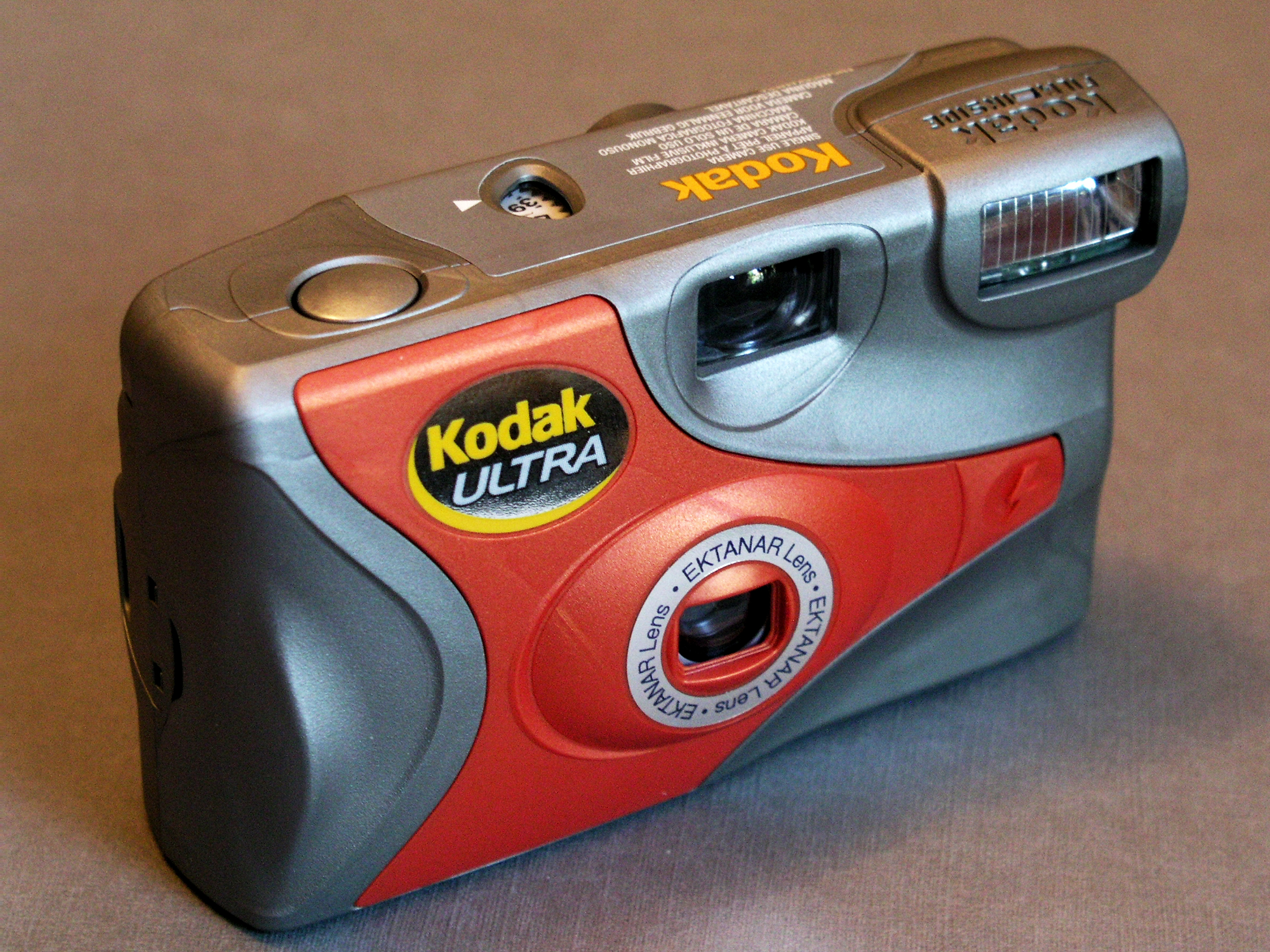
Kodak Ultra disposable camera with inbuilt flash

A disposable or single-use camera is a simple film camera, sold with film pre-loaded. Unlike more conventional cameras, a disposable is designed to be returned whole, where the entire camera is disposed of, and only the processed film returned to the customer.

Typically, they have very limited controls, with no ability to control focus, zoom, aperture or shutter speed. To aid with lighting, most are equipped with an integrated flash. Internally, modern disposable cameras use 35 mm film, but older models also used APS or 110 cartridge film.

While some disposables contain a normal roll of film, others just have the film wound internally on an open spool. Some cameras are recycled; refilled with film and resold.

Due to their ephemeral nature, disposable cameras feature as a novelty item at weddings and other events, and waterproof versions exist for underwater photography.

== History ==
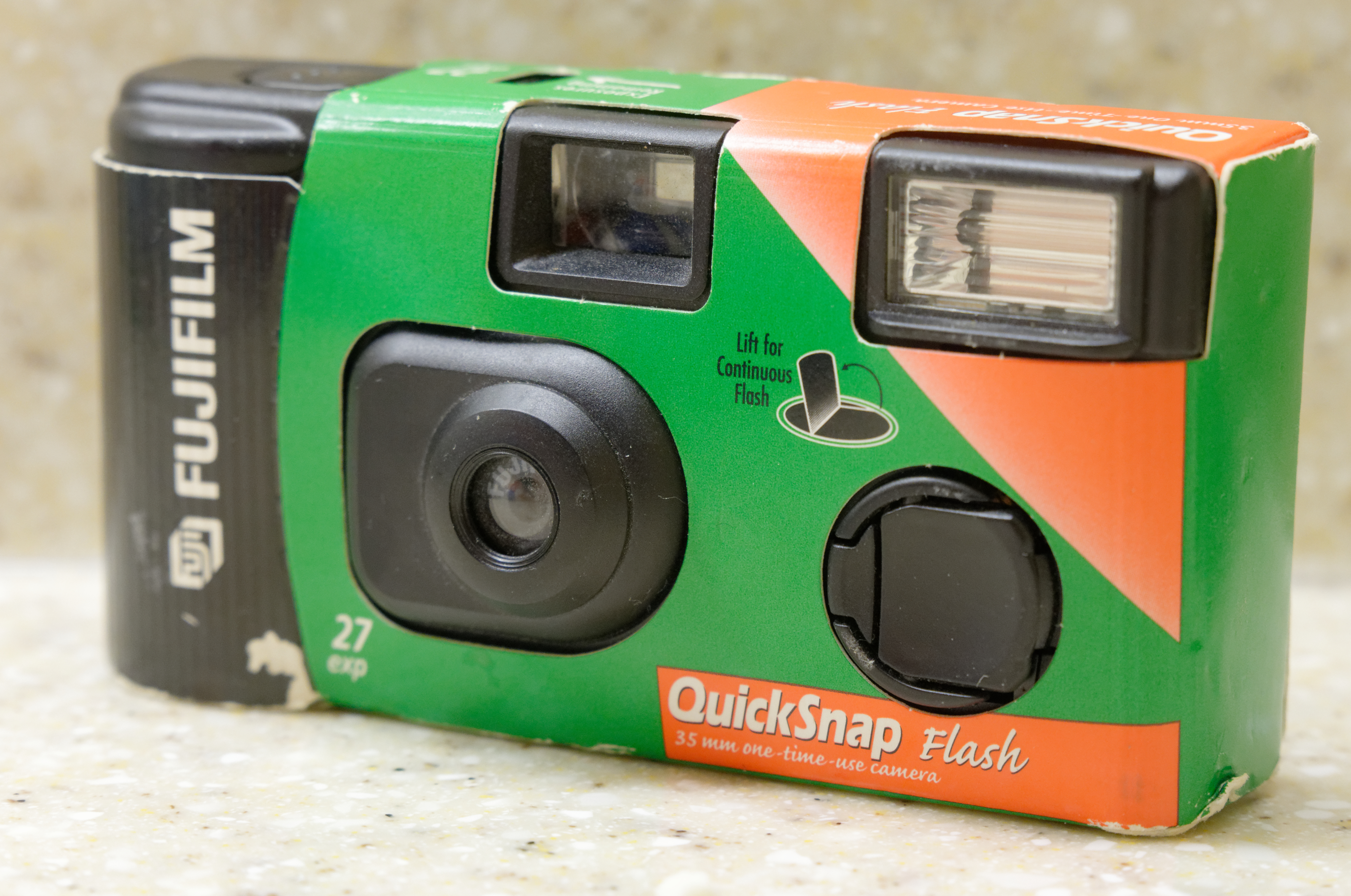
Fujifilm QuickSnap, 2003

A company called Photo-Pac produced a cardboard camera beginning in 1949 which shot eight exposures and was mailed-in for processing. Cameras were expensive, and would often have been left safely at home when photo opportunities presented themselves. Frustrated with missing photo opportunities, H. M. Stiles had invented a way to enclose 35mm film in an inexpensive enclosure without the expensive precision film transport mechanism. It cost US$1.29 (equivalent to $17.46 in 2025). Though incredibly similar to the familiar single-use cameras today, Photo-Pac failed to make a permanent impression on the market.

In 1966, French company FEX introduced a disposable bakelite camera called "Photo Pack Matic", featuring 12 photos (4×4 cm).

The currently familiar disposable camera was developed by Fujifilm in 1986. Their QuickSnap line, known as Utsurun-Desu (Japanese: 写ルンです, lit. 'It takes pictures') in Japan, used 35 mm film, while Eastman Kodak's 1987 Fling was based on 110 film. Kodak released a 35 mm version in 1988, and in 1989 renamed the 35 mm version the FunSaver and discontinued the 110 Fling.

In Japan, annual sales of disposable cameras reached a maximum of more than 89 million in 1997. Annual sales declined to less than 5 million in 2012, but increased to more than 9 million in 2019. The revived popularity of disposable cameras, such as the Fujicolor Utsurun-Desu, is an example of Showa retro.

In 2026, marking the 40th anniversary of QuickSnap, Fujifilm announced two new single-use models. The QuickSnap Black and White was preloaded with 27 exposures of ISO 400 black-and-white film and included a built-in flash. The QuickSnap Active used ISO 800 colour film and a protective housing rated for underwater use at depths of up to approximately 10 metres.

== Common uses ==
Disposable cameras are popular with tourists and people traveling around the world to save pictures of their adventures.

Since the late 1990s, disposable cameras have become increasingly popular as wedding favors. Usually they are placed on tables at wedding receptions to be used by guests to capture their unique perspective of the event. More commonly they are available in colors to match the wedding theme such as ivory, blue, white, gold, etc.

So-called "accident camera kits" containing film-based disposable cameras are increasingly being carried in vehicles to take images as evidence after an accident. The absence of batteries allows instantaneous usage even after extended storage, for example in a glove compartment.

They often have cheap plastic lenses, below average film quality, and fixed focal lengths. The quick ease of the 'point and shoot' method that these disposable cameras were made for make them popular with many photographers who enjoy the 'less than perfect' style these cameras provide, in a move away from digital imagery, which can also be seen in the rise in popularity of 'lomography'. This has also led to a number of 'lost art' type projects where disposable cameras are left in public spaces with a message for anyone finding the camera to take some images and then post the camera back, or pass it on to another person.

=== Other uses ===
The high-voltage photo flash capacitors in some cameras are sometimes extracted and used to power devices such as coilguns, stun guns, homemade Geiger counter projects and "RFID zapper" EMP devices.

== Digital ==
Digital one-time-use cameras (and also digital one-time-use camcorders) are available in some markets; for example the US saw the introduction of one such digital camera in 2004. Digital disposables have not had the success of their film based counterparts, possibly from the expense of the process (especially compared to normal digital camera use) and the poor quality of the images compared to either a typical digital camera, or a disposable film camera. Usually, the display shows the number of shots remaining, and once this is completed, the camera is returned to the store. The digital files are then extracted from the camera, and in return for keeping the camera, they are printed out or stored to CD (or DVD in the case of the video camera) for the customer. Almost all digital 'single use' cameras have been successfully hacked to eliminate the need to return them to the store. The motivations for such hacking include saving money and, more commonly, the challenge of overcoming artificial impositions (such as a 25 shot limit on an internal memory that can store 100 images).

== See also ==
- Planned obsolescence
