= Film stock =

Medium used for recording motion pictures

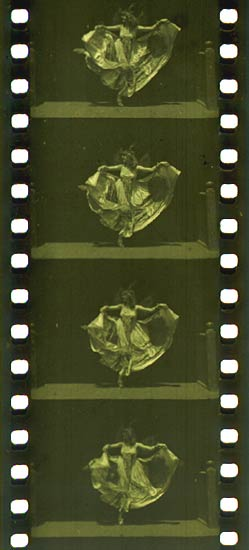
A film strip

Film stock is a type of photographic film that is used for recording motion pictures or animation. On either side is the film edge (also called a rebate border) which can contain perforations, projector feed directions, the audio track, and other information. It is recorded on by a movie camera, developed, edited, and projected onto a screen using a movie projector.

Photographic film consists of a long strip of transparent plastic film base, coated on one side with a photographic emulsion: a mixture of gelatin and microscopic light-sensitive silver halide crystals. A very short exposure is made, producing an invisible latent image in the emulsion, which can be chemically developed into a visible photograph.

Most movie film records a negative image and a reversed print onto another reel of film is needed to project from. Many commercially recorded films use a digital intermediate step, in which film is scanned digitally for editing, and either printed from the digital file onto a positive reel with a film recorder, or projected digitally. Alternatively, "reversal film" can be used, which records a positive image.

In black and white photographic film there is usually one layer of silver salts. When the exposed grains are developed, the silver salts are converted to metallic silver, which blocks light and appears as the black part of the film negative. Color film has at least three sensitive layers. Dyes, which adsorb to the surface of the silver salts, make the crystals sensitive to different colors. Typically the blue-sensitive layer is on top, followed by the green and red layers. During development, the exposed silver salts are converted to metallic silver, just as with black-and-white film. But in a color film, the by-products of the development reaction simultaneously combine with chemicals known as color couplers that are included either in the film itself or in the developer solution to form colored dyes. Because the by-products are created in direct proportion to the amount of exposure and development, the dye clouds formed are also in proportion to the exposure and development. Following development, the silver is converted back to silver salts in the bleach step. It is removed from the film in the fix step and is sometimes recovered for subsequent use or sale. Fixing leaves behind only the formed color dyes, which combine to make up the colored visible image. Later color films, like Kodacolor II, have as many as 12 emulsion layers, with upwards of 20 different chemicals in each layer. Photographic film and film stock tend to be similar in composition and speed, but often not in other parameters such as frame size and length.

== History ==
=== 1888–1899: Before standardization ===
Early motion picture experiments in the 1880s were performed using a fragile paper roll film, with which it was difficult to view a single, continuously moving image without a complex apparatus. The first transparent and flexible film base material was celluloid, which was discovered and refined for photographic use by John Carbutt, Hannibal Goodwin, and George Eastman. Eastman Kodak made celluloid film commercially available in 1889; Thomas Henry Blair, in 1891, was his first competitor. The stock had a frosted base to facilitate easier viewing by transmitted light. Emulsions were orthochromatic. By November 1891 William Dickson, at Edison's laboratory, was using Blair's stock for Kinetoscope experiments. Blair's company supplied film to Edison for five years. Between 1892 and 1893, Eastman experienced problems with production. Because of patent lawsuits in 1893, Blair left his American company and established another in Britain. Eastman became Edison's supplier of film.

Blair's new company supplied European filmmaking pioneers, including Birt Acres, Robert Paul, George Albert Smith, Charles Urban, and the Lumière Brothers. By 1896, the new movie projector required a fully transparent film base that Blair's American operation could not supply. Eastman shortly thereafter bought the company out and became the leading supplier of film stock. Louis Lumière worked with Victor Planchon to adapt the Lumière "Blue Label" (Etiquette Bleue) photographic plate emulsion for use on celluloid roll film, which began in early 1896.

Eastman's first motion picture film stock was offered in 1889. At first the film was the same as photographic film. By 1916, separate "Cine Type" films were offered. From 1895, Eastman supplied their motion picture roll film in rolls of 65 feet, while Blair's rolls were 75 feet. If longer lengths were needed, the unexposed negative rolls could be cemented in a darkroom, but this was largely undesirable by most narrative filmmakers. The makers of Actuality films were much more eager to undertake this method, however, in order to depict longer actions. They created cemented rolls as long as 1,000 feet. American Mutoscope and Biograph was the first known company to use such film for the Jeffries-Sharkey fight on 3 November 1899.

=== 1900–1919: Toward the standard picture film ===
As the quantity of film and filmmakers grew, the demand for standardization increased. Between 1900 and 1910, film formats gradually became standardized and film stocks improved. A number of film gauges were made. Eastman increased the length of rolls to 200 feet without major adjustments to the emulsion, retaining a large market share. Lumière reformulated its stock to match the speed of Eastman film, naming it 'Etiquette Violette' (Violet Label). Blair sold his English company to Pathé in 1907 and retired to the US. Pathé began to supplement its operation in 1910 by purchasing film prints, stripping the emulsion from the film base and re-coating it. 35mm film began to become the dominant gauge because of the commonality of Edison's and Lumière's cameras. Consumers usually purchased unperforated film and had to punch it by perforators that were often imprecise, causing difficulty in making prints for the opposite perforation format. In 1908, the perforators began to be made by Bell and Howell. Eastman Kodak used the Bell and Howell machine to perforate its films. In 1909, Edison's organization of the Motion Picture Patents Trust agreed to what would become the standard: 35 mm gauge, with Edison perforations and a 1.33 aspect ratio.

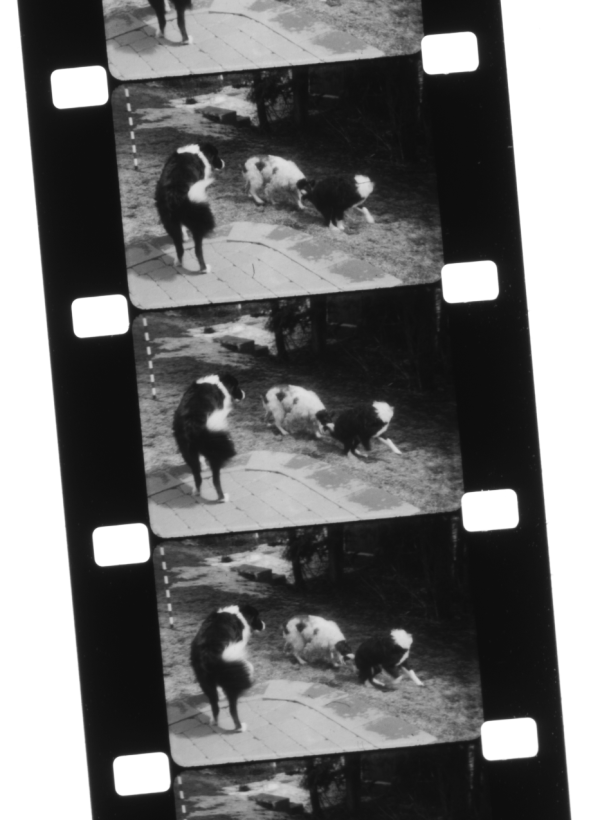
A silent home movie on 16mm black-and-white reversal double-perforation film stock

Agfa began to produce motion picture film in 1913, but remained a largely local supplier until World War I boycotts of popular French, American and Italian film stocks allowed the UFA film studio to flourish, boosting Agfa's orders. All film stocks were manufactured on a nitrate film base, which is highly flammable. Nitrate film fires were virtually impossible to extinguish. A significant number of fatal accidents occurred in theatrical projection booths, where the heat of the projector lamp made ignition a possibility. Amateur filmmaking (home movies) slowly developed during this period. Kodak developed a heat-resistant 'safety base' for home projection.

In 1909, tests showed cellulose diacetate to be a viable replacement base, and Kodak began selling acetate-base films the following year in 22 mm widths for Edison's work on the Home Kinetoscope, which was commercially released in 1912. Eastman Kodak introduced a non-flammable 35 mm film stock in 1909. The plasticizers used to make the film flexible evaporated quickly, making the film dry and brittle, causing splices to part and perforations to tear. In 1911 the major American film studios returned to using nitrate stock. More amateur formats began to use acetate-based film, and several, including Kodak's own 16 mm format, were designed specifically to be manufactured with safety base. Kodak released Cine Negative Film Type E in 1916 and Type F (later known as Negative Film Par Speed Type 1201) in 1917. As both of these orthochromatic films were no faster than previous offerings, the improvements were in granularity and sharpness.

=== 1920s: Diversification of film sensitivity ===
Film stock manufacturers began to diversify their products. Each manufacturer had previously offered one negative stock (usually orthochromatic) and one print stock. In 1920, a variant of Type F film known as X-back was introduced to counteract the effects of static electricity on the film, which can cause sparking and create odd exposure patterns on the film. A resin backing was used on the film, which rendered the film too opaque to allow focusing through the back of the film, a common technique for many cameras of that era. The X-back stock was popular on the east coast of the US. Other manufacturers were established in the 1920s, including DuPont in 1926 and Gevaert in 1925. Panchromatic film stock became more common. Created in 1913 for use in early color film processes such as Kinemacolor, panchromatic was first used in a black-and-white film for exterior sequences in Queen of the Sea (1918) and originally available as a special order product. The stock's increased sensitivity to red light made it an attractive option for day for night shooting. Kodak financed a feature in 1922, shot entirely with panchromatic stock, The Headless Horseman, to promote the film when Kodak introduced it as a standard option. Panchromatic film stock increased costs and no motion pictures were produced on it in their entirety for several years. The cross-cutting between panchromatic and orthochromatic stocks caused continuity problems with costume tones and panchromatic film was often avoided.

Orthochromatic film remained dominant until the mid-1920s due to Kodak's lack of competition in the panchromatic market. In 1925, Gevaert introduced an orthochromatic stock with limited color sensitivity and a fully panchromatic stock, Pan-23. In 1926, Kodak lowered the price of panchromatic stock to parity with its orthochromatic offering and the panchromatic stock began to overtake the orthochromatic stock's market share within a few years. As similar panchromatic film stocks were also manufactured by Agfa and Pathé, making the shift to panchromatic stocks largely complete by 1928, Kodak discontinued orthochromatic stock in 1930.

=== Color films ===
Experiments with color films were made as early as the late 19th century, but practical color film was not commercially viable until 1908, and for amateur use when Kodak introduced Kodachrome for 16 mm in 1935 and 8 mm in 1936. Commercially successful color processes used special cameras loaded with black-and-white separation stocks rather than color negative. Kinemacolor (1908–1914), Technicolor processes 1 through 4 (1917–1954), and Cinecolor used one, two or three strips of monochrome film stock sensitized to certain primary colors or exposed behind color filters in special cameras. Technicolor introduced a color reversal stock, called Monopack, for location shooting in 1941; it was ultimately a 35 mm version of Kodachrome that could be used in standard motion picture cameras.

Eastman Kodak introduced their first 35mm color negative stock, Eastman Color Negative film 5247, in 1950. A higher quality version in 1952, Eastman Color Negative film 5248, was quickly adopted by Hollywood for color motion picture production, replacing both the expensive three-strip Technicolor process and Monopack.

== Classification and properties ==
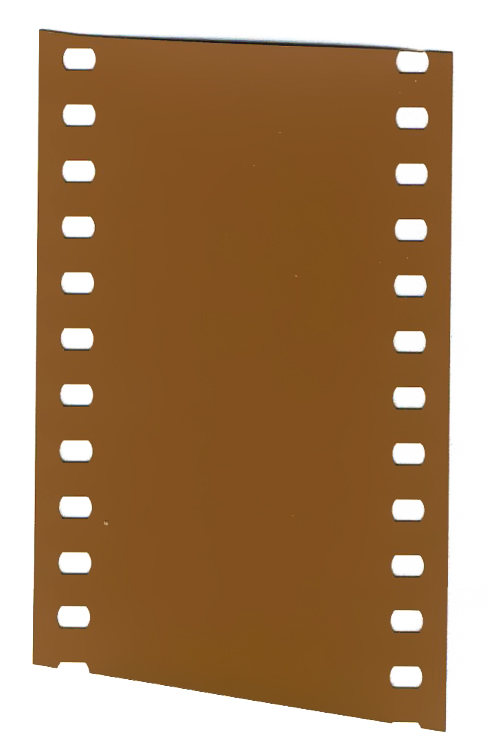
A short strip of undeveloped 35 mm color negative film

There are several variables in classifying stocks; in practice, one orders raw stock by a code number, based on desired sensitivity to light.

=== Base ===
A piece of film consists of a light-sensitive emulsion applied to a tough, transparent base, sometimes attached to anti-halation backing or "rem-jet" layer (now only on camera films). Originally the highly flammable cellulose nitrate was used. In the 1930s, film manufacturers introduced "safety film" with a cellulose triacetate plastic base. All amateur film stocks were safety film, but the use of nitrate persisted for professional releases. Kodak discontinued the manufacture of nitrate base in 1951, and the industry transitioned entirely to safety film in 1951 in the United States and by 1955 internationally. Since the late 1990s, almost all release prints have used polyester film stock.

=== Emulsion ===
The emulsion consists of silver halide grains suspended in a gelatin colloid; in the case of color film, there are three layers of silver halide, which are mixed with color couplers and interlayers that filter specific light spectra. These end up creating yellow, cyan, and magenta layers in the negative after development.

=== Chemistry ===
Development chemicals applied to an appropriate film can produce either a positive (showing the same densities and colors as the subject) or negative image (with dark highlights, light shadows, and, in principle, complementary colors). The first films were darkened by light: negative films. Later films that produce a positive image became known as reversal films; processed transparent film of this type can be projected onto a screen. Negative images need to be transferred onto photographic paper or other substrate which reverses the image again, producing a final positive image. Creating a positive image from a negative film can also be done by scanning the negative to create a computer file which can then be reversed by software.

=== Image record ===
Different emulsions and development processes exist for a variety of image recording possibilities: the two most common of which are black and white, and color. However, there are also variant types, such as infrared film (in black and white or false color); specialist technical films, such as those used for X-rays; and obsolete processes, such as orthochromatic film. Generally, however, the vast majority of stock used today is "normal" (visible spectrum) color, although "normal" black and white also commands a significant minority percentage.

=== Physical characteristics ===
Film is also classified according to its gauge and the arrangement of its perforations— gauges range from 8 mm to 70 mm or more, while perforations may vary in shape, pitch, and positioning. The film is also distinguished by how it is wound with regard to perforations and base or emulsion side, as well as whether it is packaged around a core, a daylight spool, or within a cartridge. Depending on the manufacturing processes and camera equipment, lengths can vary anywhere from 25 to 2000 feet. Common lengths include 25 feet for 8 mm, 50 feet for Super 8, 100 and 400 feet for 16 mm, 400 and 1000 feet for 35 mm, and 1000 for 65/70 mm.

=== Responsivity ===
A critical property of a stock is its film speed, determined by ASA or its sensitivity to light listed by a measurement on the raw stock which must be chosen with care. Speed determines the range of lighting conditions under which the film can be shot, and is related to granularity and contrast, which influence the look of the image. The stock manufacturer will usually give an exposure index (EI) number equal to the ASA which they recommend exposing for. However, factors such as forced or non-standard development (such as bleach bypass or cross processing), compensation for filters or shutter angle, as well as intended under- and over-exposure may cause the cinematographer to actually "rate" the stock differently from the EI. This new rating is not a change to the stock itself — it is merely a way of calculating exposure without figuring out the compensation after each light reading.

=== Color temperature ===
Another important quality of color film stock in particular is its color balance, which is defined by the color temperature at which it accurately records white. Tungsten lighting is defined at 3200 K, which is considered "warmer" in tone and shifted towards orange; daylight is defined at 5600 K, which is considered "colder" and shifted towards blue. This means that unfiltered tungsten stock will look normal shot under tungsten lights, but blue if shot during daylight. Conversely, daylight stock shot in daylight will look normal, but orange if shot under tungsten lights. Color temperature issues such as these can be compensated for by other factors such as lens filters and color gels placed in front of the lights. The color temperature of a film stock is generally indicated next to the film speed number — e.g. 500T stock is color film stock with an ASA of 500 and balanced for tungsten light; 250D would have an ASA of 250 and be balanced for daylight. While black-and-white film has no color temperature itself, the silver halide grains themselves tend to be slightly more responsive to blue light, and therefore will have daylight and tungsten speeds — e.g. Kodak's Double-X stock is rated 250D/200T, since the tungsten light will give slightly less exposure than an equivalent amount of daylight.

=== Sound ===
A fundamental limitation of film stock as a recording medium is that it reacts to light, but not sound. This is why the first films were literally silent (and exhibitors often provided live musical accompaniment to compensate). Sound films later became possible after engineers developed techniques like sound-on-disc to synchronize playback of a separate soundtrack and then sound-on-film to print the soundtrack on the film itself.

== Deterioration ==
All plastic is subject to deterioration through physical or chemical means, and thus, motion picture film is at risk for the same reason. Films deteriorate over time, which can damage individual frames or even lead to the entire film being destroyed. Cellulose nitrate, cellulose diacetate and triacetate are known to be unstable media: improperly preserved film can deteriorate in a period of time much faster than many photographs or other visual presentations. Cellulose nitrate, because of its unstable chemistry, eventually breaks down, releasing nitric acid, further catalyzing the decomposition. In the final stage of celluloid decomposition, the film has turned into a rust-like powder. Likewise, tri-acetate stock is also vulnerable to deterioration. Because of the small gauge of the film, owners of home-made films often find that their film can become shrunken and brittle to the point where the film is unwatchable in the space of a few years. In general, decaying acetate film breaks down into acetic acid, and similar to celluloid decomposition, leads to an auto-catylictic breakdown of the base that cannot be reversed. The result of the acetic acid released is a strong odor of vinegar, which is why the decay process in the archival community is known as "vinegar syndrome". Modern polyester-based stocks are far more stable by comparison and are rated to last hundreds of years if stored properly.

== Intermediate and print stocks ==
The distinction between camera stocks and print stocks involves a difference in the recording process. When the work print or edit master has been approved, the Original Camera Negative (OCN) is assembled by a negative cutter using the edited work print or EDL (edit decision list) as a guide. A series of Answer Prints are then made from the OCN. During the Answer Print stage, corrections in the film's density and color are corrected (timed) to the filmmakers' tastes. Interpositive (IP) prints are struck from the OCN, checked to make sure they look the same as the custom timed Answer Print, and then each IP is used to make one or more Dupe Negative (DN) copies. The release prints are then generated from the DN(s). Recently, with the development of digital intermediate (DI), it has become possible to completely edit, composite visual effects, and color grade the image digitally at full resolution and bit-depth. In this workflow, the answer print is generated digitally and then written out to the IP stage using a laser film printer known as a film recorder.

Due to the specialized nature of the exposure and the higher degree of control afforded by the film lab equipment, these intermediate and release stocks are specially designed solely for these applications and are generally not feasible for camera shooting. Because intermediates only function to maintain the image information accurately across duplication, each manufacturer tends to only produce one or two different intermediate stocks. Similarly, release print stocks usually are available only in two varieties: a "normal" print or a deluxe print (on more-costly print film like Kodak Vision Premiere) with slightly greater saturation and contrast.

== Decline and current status ==
Use of film remained the dominant form of cinematography until the early 21st century when digital formats supplanted the use of film in many applications. This has also led to the replacement of film projectors with digital projection.

Despite this, some filmmakers continue to opt for film stock as a medium of choice for aesthetic reasons. Movies produced entirely on photochemical film or with a combination of analog and digital methods are a minority, but maintain a stable presence among both arthouse and mainstream film releases.

However, digital formats are sometimes deliberately altered to achieve a film look, such as adding film grain or other noise for artistic effect.

== See also ==
- Direct film
- Film format
- Film leader
- Film preservation
- Fujifilm
- List of film formats
- List of motion picture film stocks
- List of photographic films
- Color motion picture film
- Photographic film with emphasis on film for still photography.
- ORWO
- Tasma
- Video
