= Svema =

Former film and magnetic tape manufacturer in Shostka, Sumy Oblast, Ukraine

- Industry: Photography
- Founded: 1931
- Headquarters: Shostka, Ukraine
- Products: Photographic film, Photochemistry

Svema (Russian: Свема, Светочувствительные материалы, lit. 'Light-sensitive Materials') was a major Soviet-era state-owned manufacturer of photographic film, magnetic tapes and cassettes, based in Shostka, Sumy Oblast, Ukraine. The manufacturing was started in 1931, at the time, in Ukrainian SSR, USSR. Svema had a registered trade mark and formerly was referred as "NPO Svema" of the Shostka Chemical Plant.

They made black-and-white photographic film, photographic paper, B&W motion picture film until 2010s, colour photographic and motion picture film until 1995 and magnetic tapes until 2014. Svema products were known among enthusiasts as an easy and study product for beginners in home film development and printing.

The use of Svema color film was common for Soviet and post-Soviet cinema from the late 1960s until the late 1990s with some student works being shot on Svema up until 2010s.

Svema lost its market share in former Soviet Union countries to imported products during late 1990s when magnetic tapes were superseded by compact discs. The enterprise went bankrupt in 2015 and its main buildings were demolished in 2019.

== History ==
The manufacturing plant was founded in 1928 as a joint venture between Soviet government and French company Lumière that signed a contract to start production of celluloid photographic film in the Soviet Union.

== Color photographic films ==
- Svema DS-4 Color Negative Film ISO/ASA 50
- Svema CO-32D Color Reversal film ISO/ASA 32
- Svema CO-50d Color Reversal film ISO/ASA 50
- Svema CND 64 Color Negative Film ISO/ASA 64
- Svema TsNL 65 Color Negative Film ISO/ASA 80
- Svema LN-9 Color Negative Film, 35mm motion picture film stock
- Svema DS-5M Color Negative Film, 35mm motion picture film stock

== Tape ==
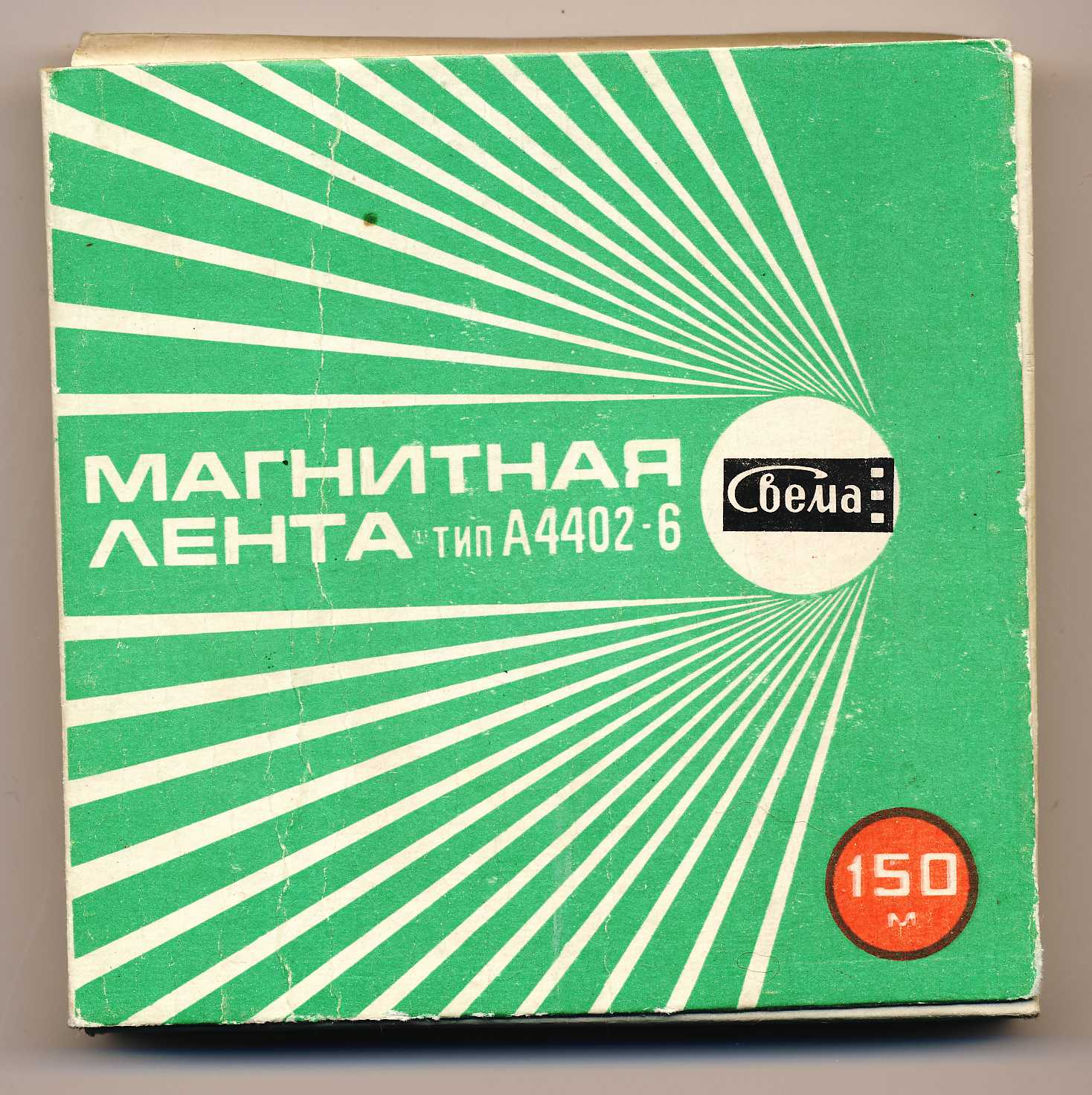
Svema magnetic tape for reel-to-reel recorder, 1970s

Reel to reel tapes

== Black-and-white photographic films ==
Before 1987
(old GOST speed scale)

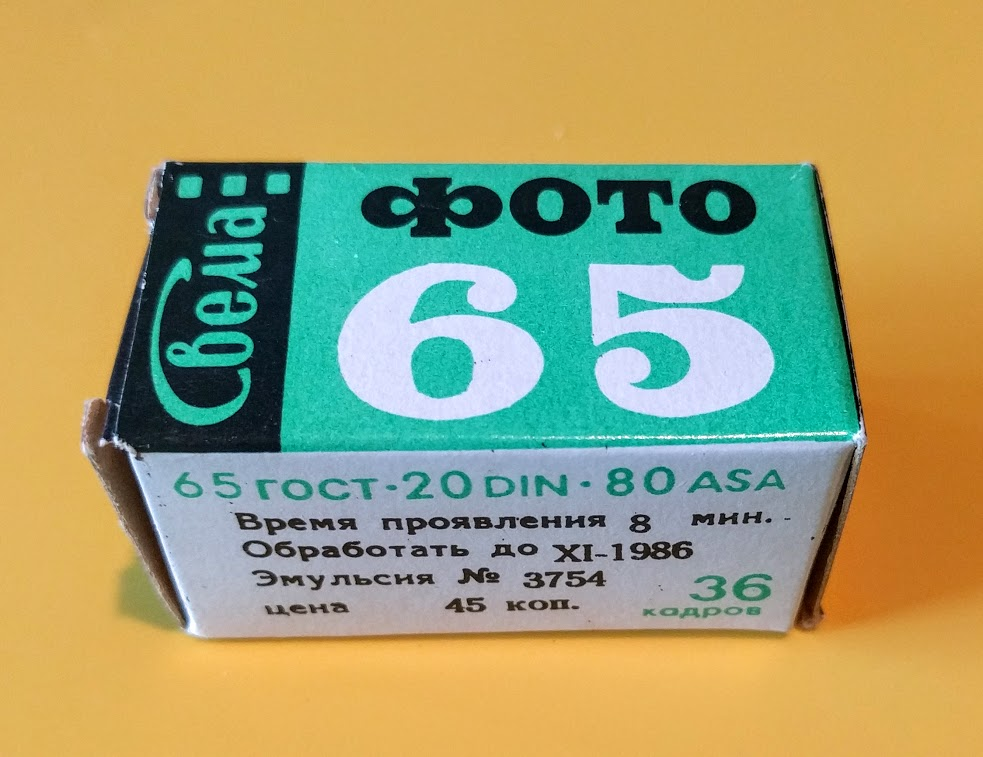
Svema 65 film

- Svema Foto 32; 32 GOST, ISO 40/17°
- Svema Foto 65; 65 GOST, ISO 80/20°; sheet films 6.5×9 cm - 30×40 cm, KB, 6×9", bulk
- Svema Foto 130; 130 GOST, ISO 160/23°; KB, bulk
- Svema Foto 250; 250 GOST, ISO 320/26° (Daylight); 350 GOST, ISO 400/27° (Tungsten); KB, bulk

1987-1990
(new GOST speed scale, same as ASA)

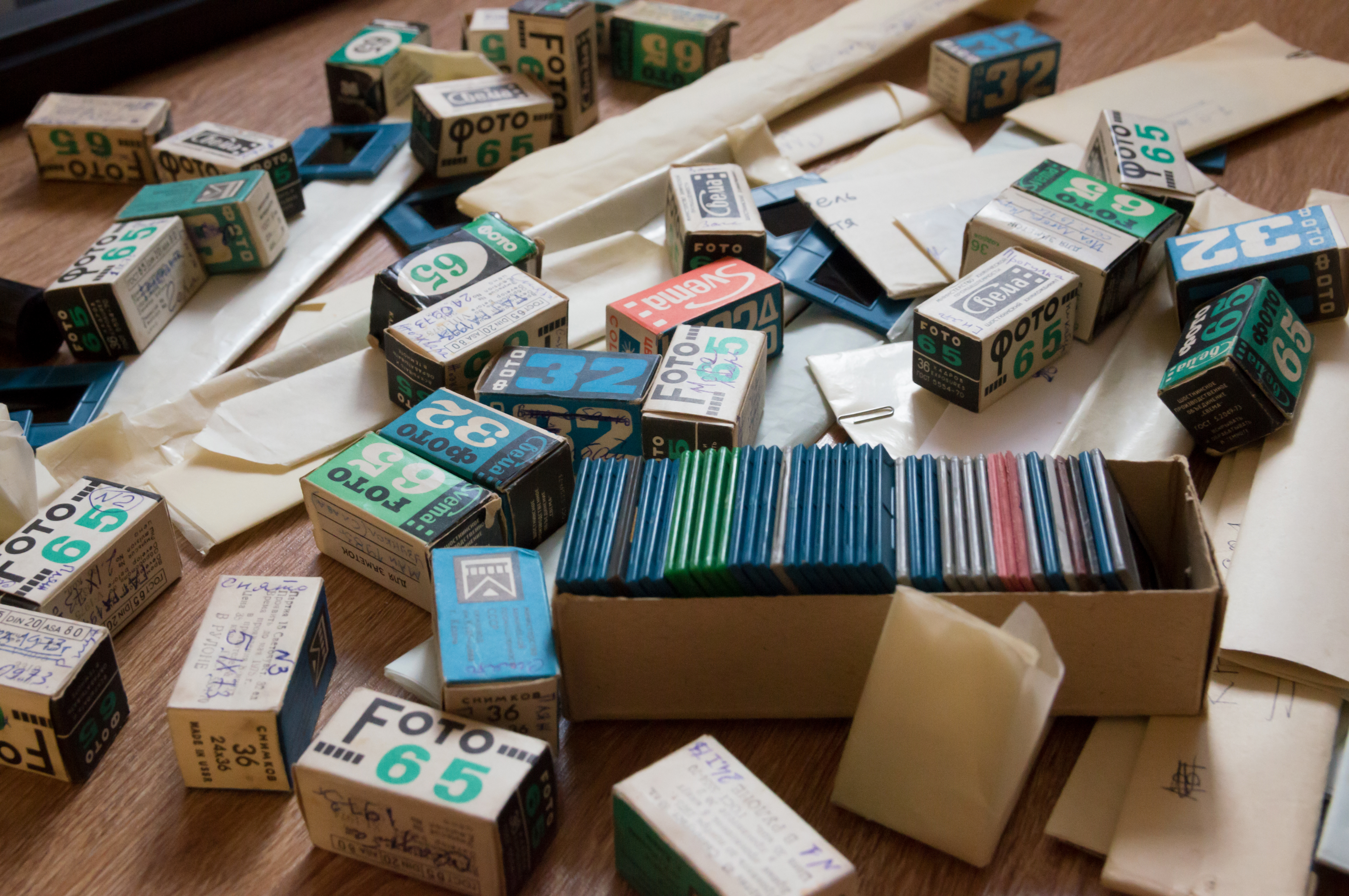
Assortment of Svema film

- Svema Foto 32; ISO 32/16°
- Svema Foto 64; ISO 64/19°
- Svema Foto 125; ISO 125/22°
- Svema Foto 250; ISO 250/25° (Daylight); ISO 320/26° (Tungsten)
- Svema Reporter; 200 GOST, ISO 200/24° (actually cinematographic filmstock); KB, bulk

After 1990
(ISO speed scale)

- Svema Foto 50; ISO 50/18°
- Svema Foto 100; ISO 100/21°; KB, 6×9", bulk
- Svema Foto 200; ISO 200/24°; KB, bulk
- Svema Foto 400; ISO 400/27°; KB, bulk

== See also ==
- Astrum – a company that took over some of Svema's manufacturing equipment after its closure
- Tasma
