= Shostka =

City in Sumy Oblast, Ukraine

Shostka Шостка
- City
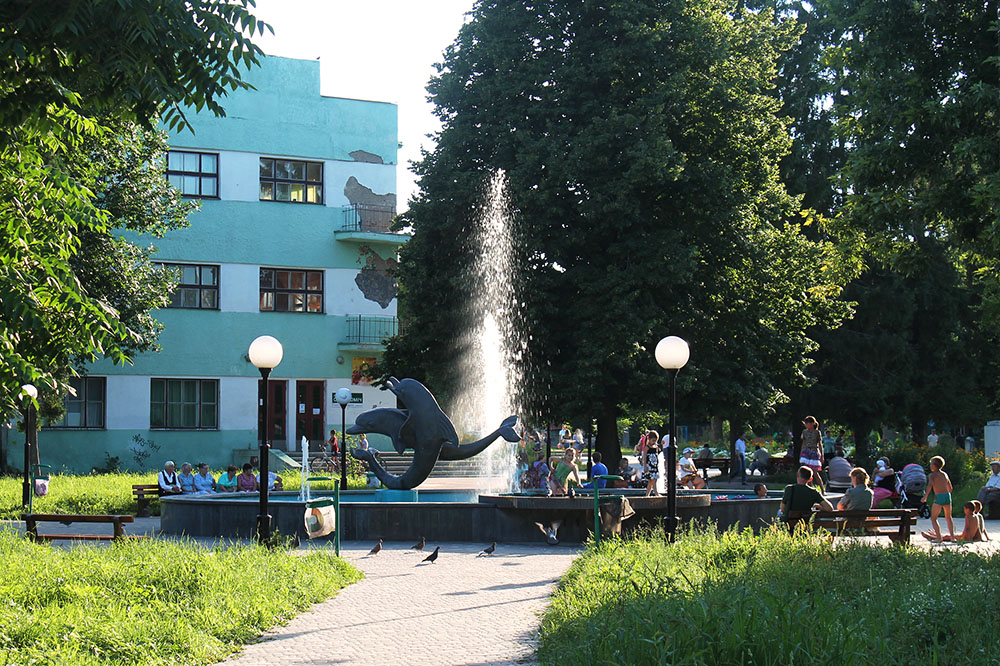

- Flag Seal
- Interactive map of Shostka
- Location within Sumy Oblast Location within Ukraine
- Coordinates: 51°52′N 33°29′E
- Country: Ukraine
- Oblast: Sumy Oblast
- Raion: Shostka Raion
- Hromada: Shostka urban hromada
- Founded: 18th century

Area
  - Total: 36 km^{2} (14 sq mi)
- Elevation: 171 m (561 ft)

Population (2022)
  - Total: 71,966
- Website: https://www.shostka-rada.gov.ua/

Shostka (Ukrainian: Шостка, IPA: [ˈʃɔstkɐ]) is a city in Sumy Oblast, northeastern Ukraine. Shostka serves as the administrative center of Shostka Raion. Population: 71,966 (2022 estimate).

The city lies on the Shostka River, a tributary of the Desna, from which it gets its name. Shostka is an important centre of industry: in chemicals (see Svema) and in dairy, the Shostka City Milk Plant, acquired by the Bel Group.

== History ==
In 1739, a gunpowder factory (now Zirka factory) was built there. Since that time, Shostka was one of the most important gunpowder suppliers in the Russian Empire. In 1893, a branch of a nearby railroad line was built. Shostka was granted municipal rights in 1920. In 1931, a film factory was built in Shostka which was one of the main suppliers of cinema and photo film in the USSR.

During the 2022 Russian invasion of Ukraine, Shostka was besieged by Russian troops on February 24. and may have been partially occupied. During the withdrawal from the Chernihiv Oblast and Sumy Oblast, Russian troops left Shostka.

== Demographics ==
Shostka's population: 1926 — 8,600 inhabitants, 1959 — 39,000 inhabitants, 1970 — 64,000 inhabitants, 1979 — 80,000 inhabitants, 1984 — 84,000 inhabitants. In 2001, Shostka had a population of 87,200 inhabitants. The ethnic and linguitsic composition was as follows:

Ethnic groups in Shostka
	percent
Ukrainians	86.74%
Russians	9.19%
Belarusians	0.30%
Jews	0.12%
Armenians	0.10%
Gypsies	0.07%
Tatars	0.05%
Azeris	0.04%
others	3.39%

Native languages in Shostka
	percent
Ukrainian	60.8%
Russian	35.7%
Belarusian	0.1%
Armenian	0.1%
others	3.3%

== Sports ==
Shostka has the football team FC Shostka.

== In popular culture ==
Shostka is the hometown of the fictional Mousekewitz mice family in the 1986 animated film An American Tail, the opening of which depicts Cossack and Cossacks' cats raiding the town.

== Notable people ==
- Dmitry Chechulin (1901, Shostka – 1981, Moscow), Soviet Stalinist architect
- Vitalii Huliaiev, soldier
- Ivan Kozhedub (1920–1991), Aviator, thrice Hero of the Soviet Union; lived in Shostka in his early years
- Ihor Molotok, politician
- Iryna Novozhylova, sportswoman
- Vyacheslav Serdyuk, sportsman
- Oleksandr Sorokalet (volleyball)
- Olena Zubrilova, sportswoman
- Masha Kondratenko, singer

== Gallery ==
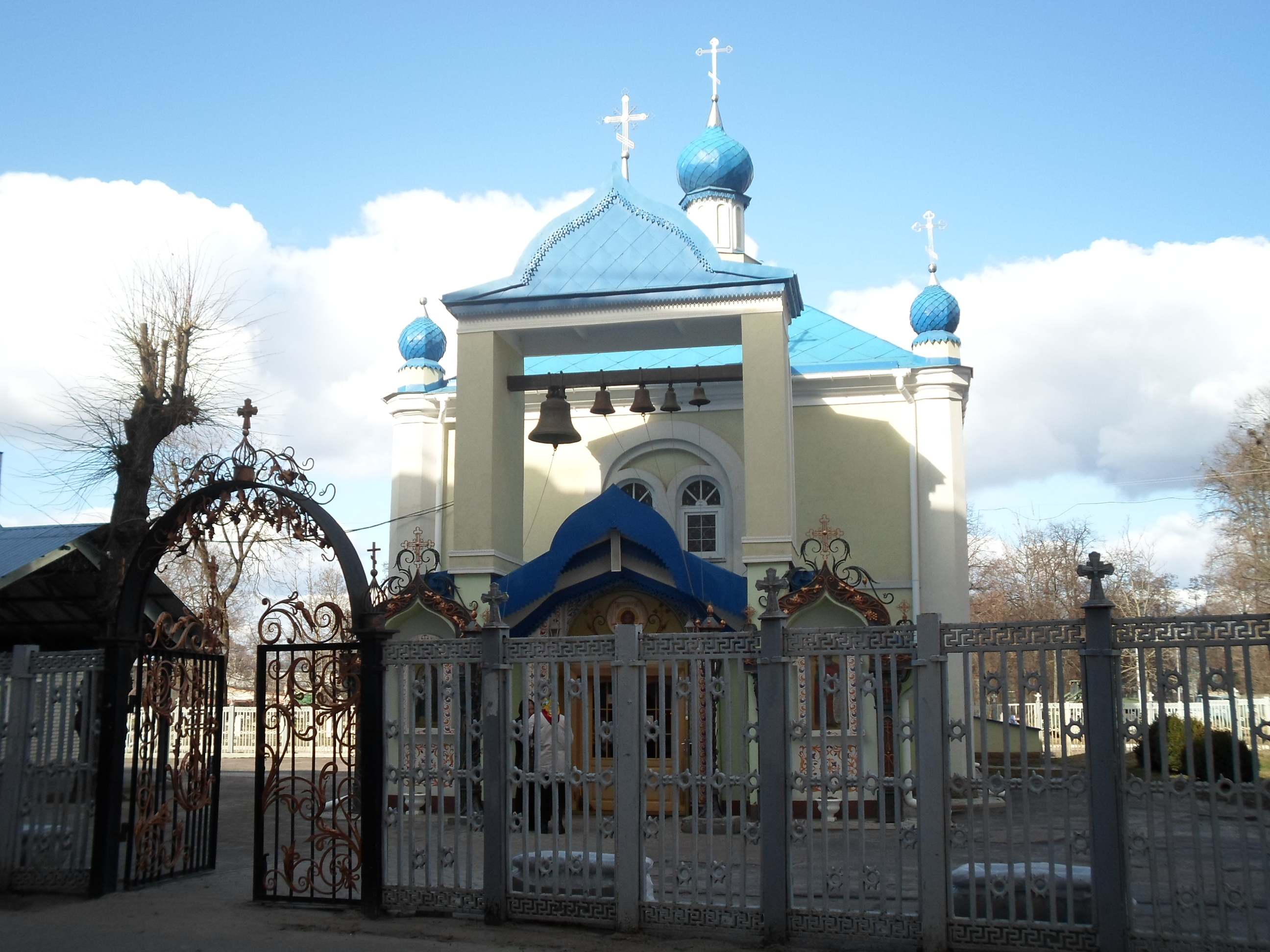
Nativity of Christ Church

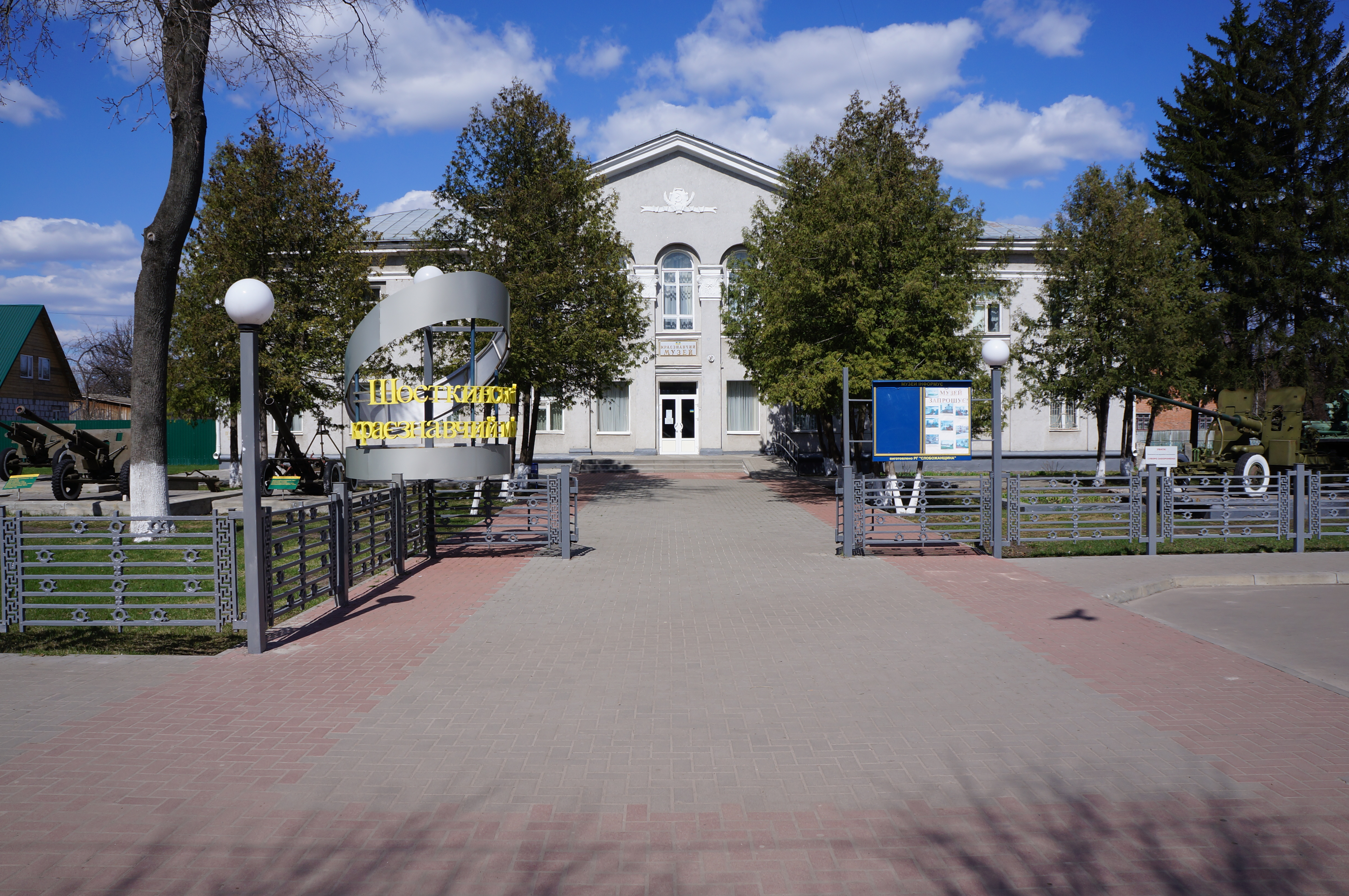
Local museum on Svobody Boulevard

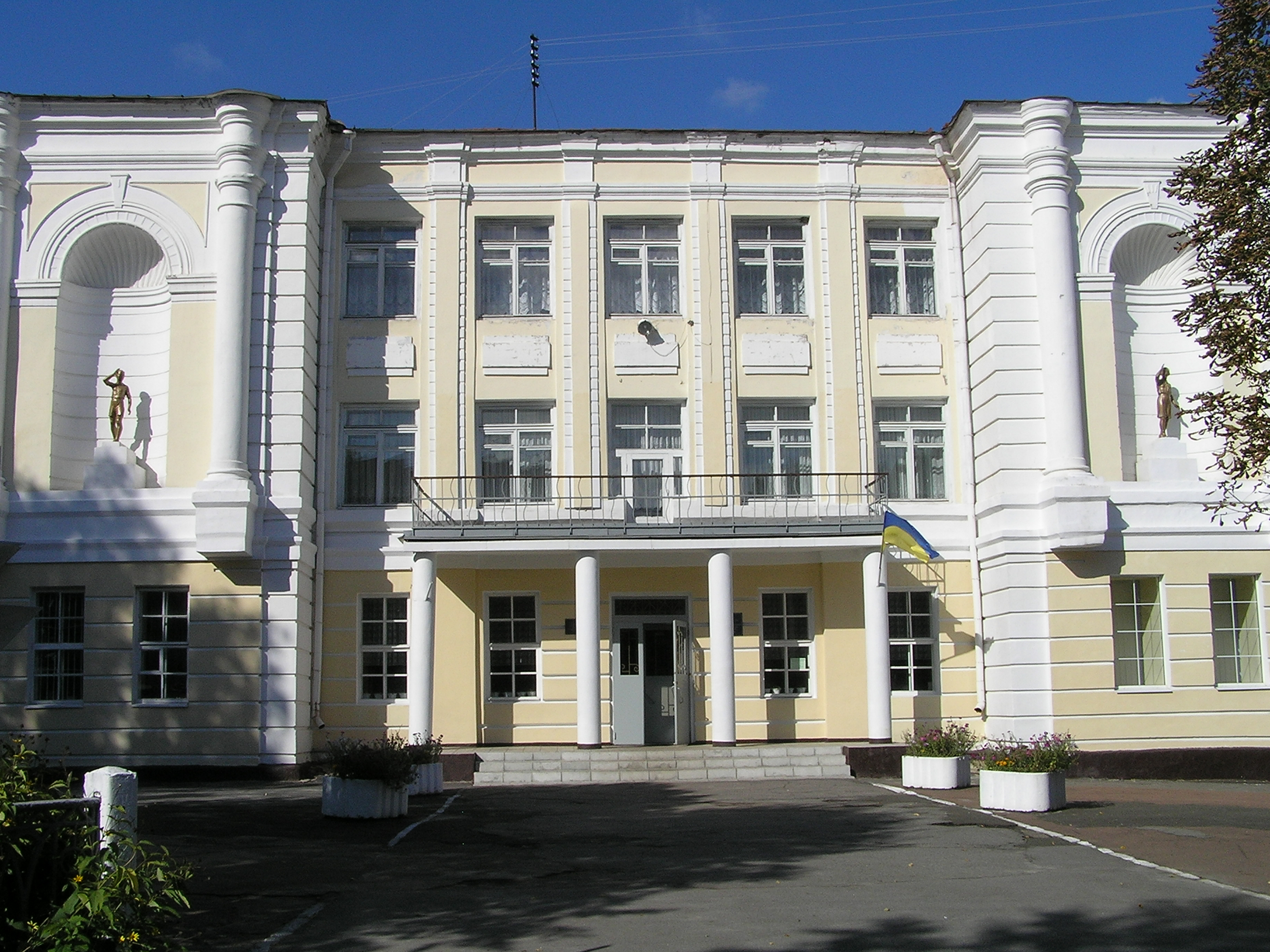
School n. 2

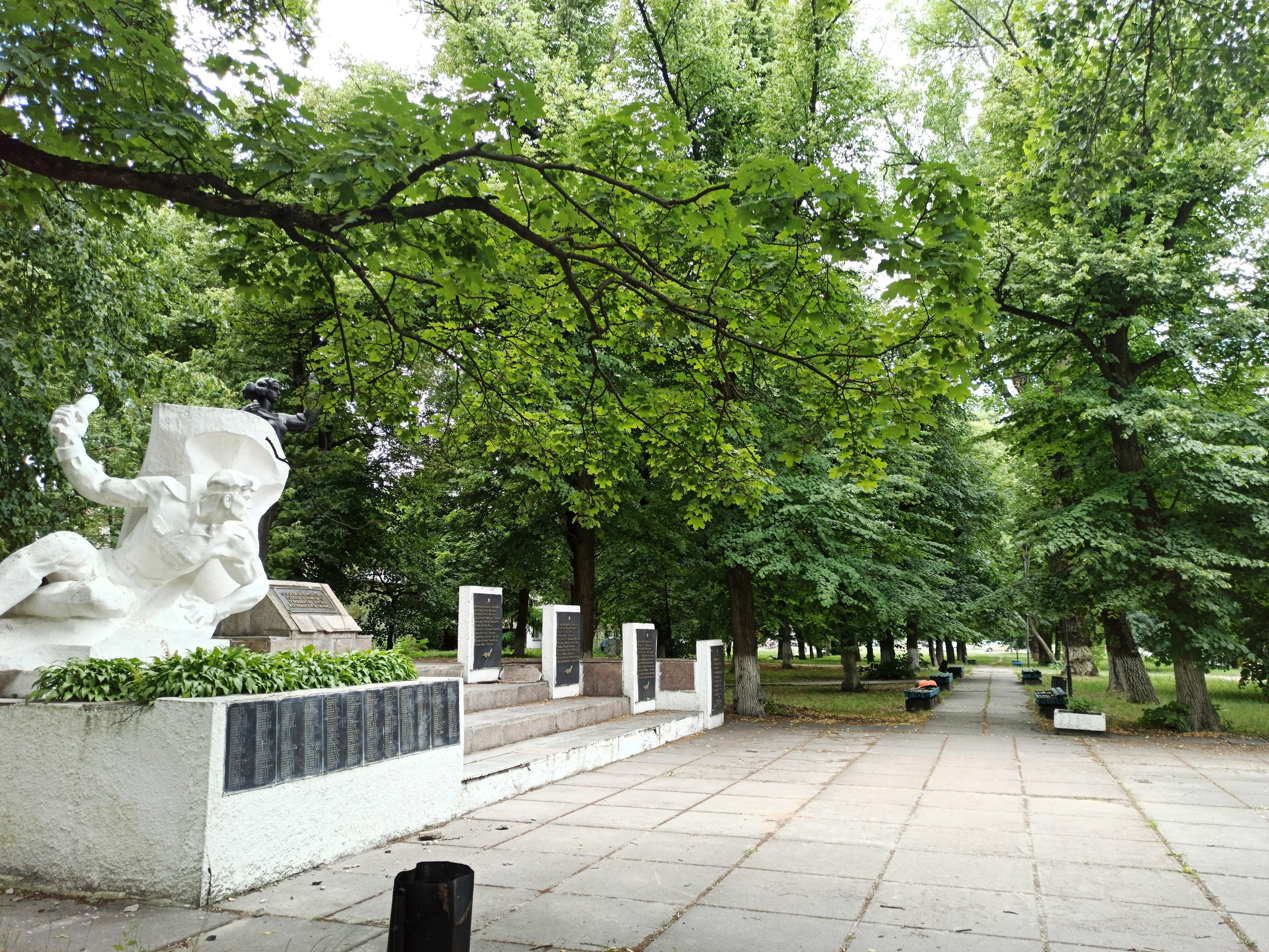
Sadovyi Boulevard

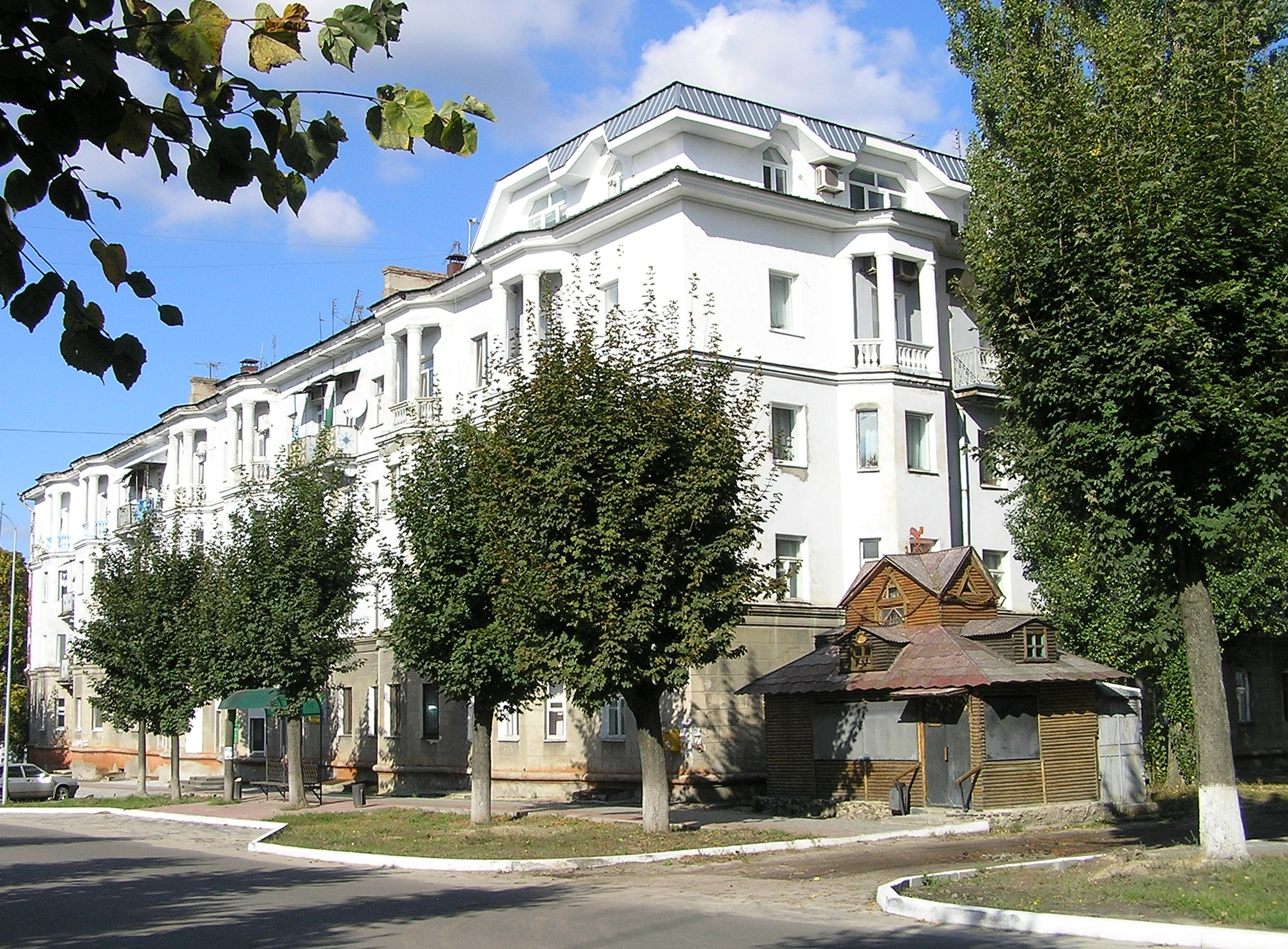
Residential buildings on Deputatska Street

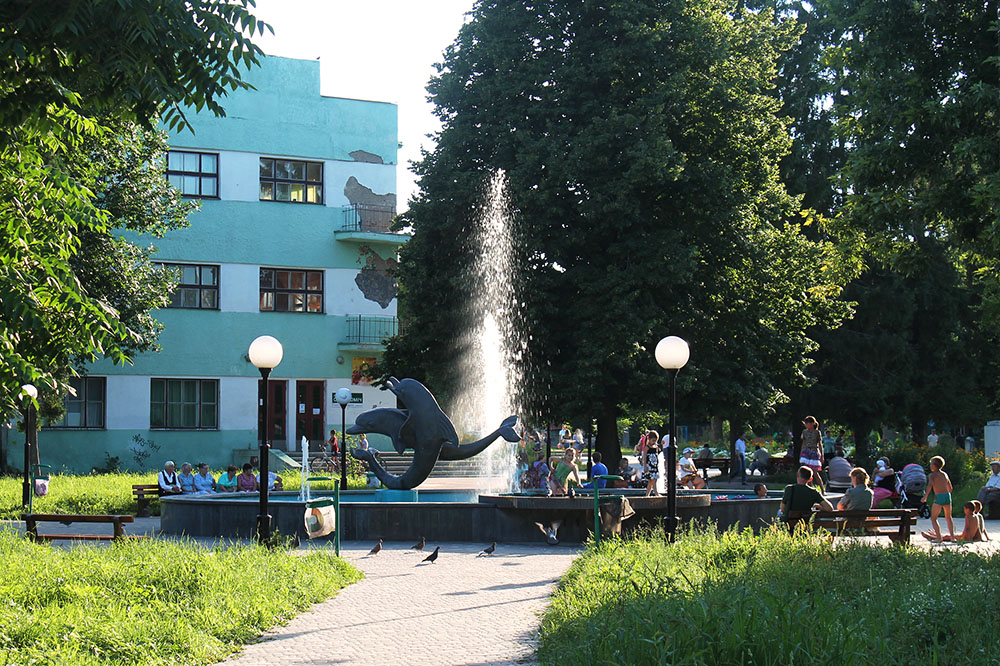
Freedom Park in Shostka

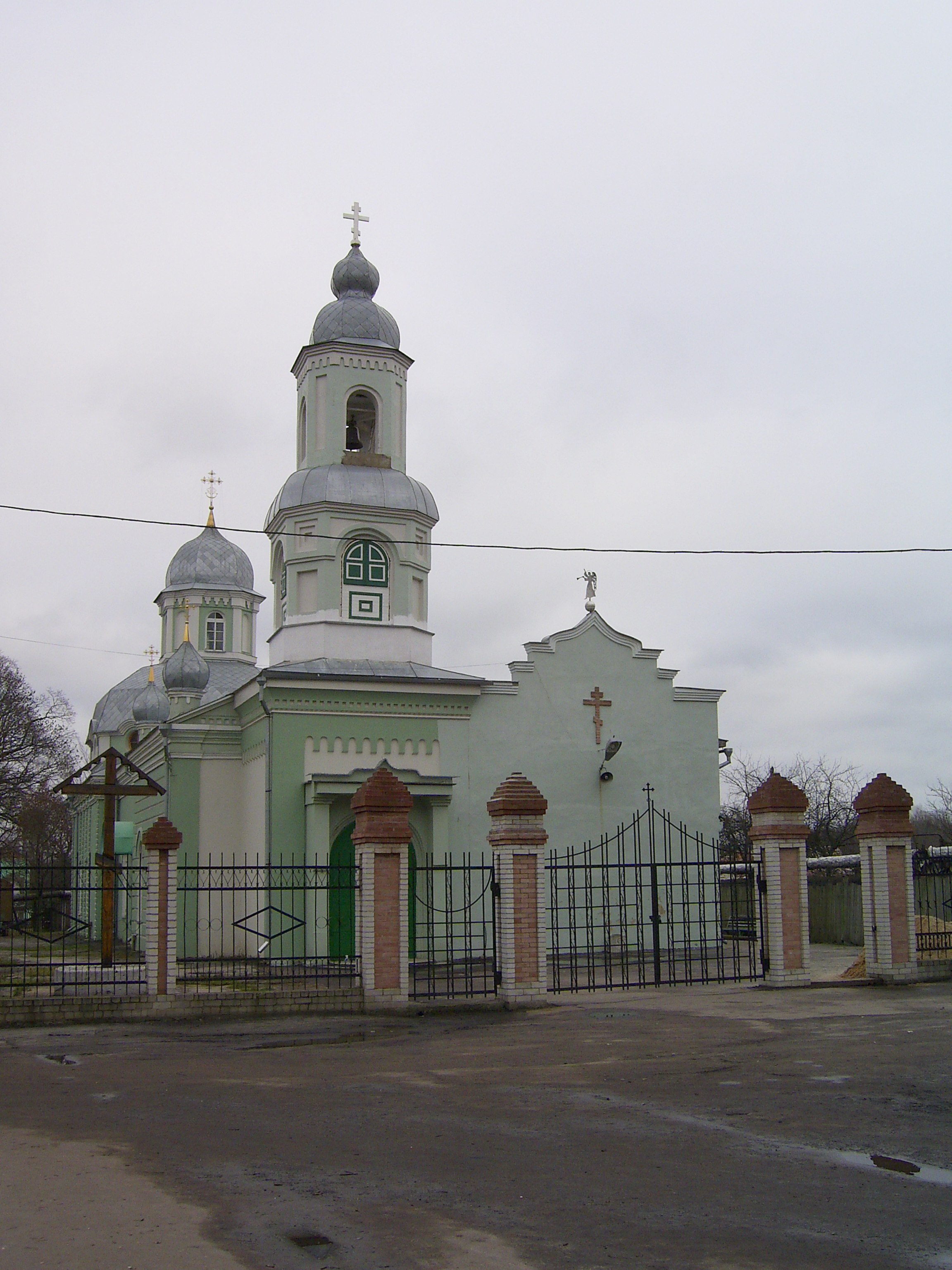
Church of the Nativity of Christ in 1883
