= Vitalii Huliaiev =

Ukrainian military officer (1978–2022)

- Born: 26 May 1978; Shostka, Sumy Oblast, Ukrainian SSR, Soviet Union
- Died: 23 July 2022 (aged 44); Outskirts of Mykolaiv, Ukraine
- Allegiance: Ukraine
- Branch: Armed Forces of Ukraine (1995–2022)
- Rank: Colonel
- Commands: 28th Mechanized Brigade
- Battles / wars: Russo-Ukrainian War; War in Donbas; Russian invasion of Ukraine †
- Awards: Order of Bohdan Khmelnytsky III degree (posthumously)

Vitalii Anatoliiovych Huliaiev (Ukrainian: Віталій Анатолійович Гуляєв; 26 May 1978 — 23 July 2022) was a Ukrainian military officer. He served in the Armed Forces of Ukraine, rising to the rank of colonel, and serving as commander of the 28th Separate Mechanized Brigade between 2021 and 2022.

Huliaiev had previously been the chief of staff of the 28th Mechanized Brigade, and commander of the 13th Motorized Infantry Battalion between 2018 and 2019. He had been in combat action since the beginning of the war in eastern Ukraine in 2014, and died during the Russian invasion of Ukraine in 2022. He was posthumously appointed a Knight of the Order of Bohdan Khmelnytsky III degree in 2022.

== Biography ==
Huliaiev was born in 1978 in the city of Shostka, Sumy Oblast. He joined the Armed Forces of Ukraine in 1995. He served at the front since the beginning of the war in eastern Ukraine in 2014.

In 2018, Vitalii Huliaiev, with the rank of lieutenant colonel, headed the 13th Motorized Infantry Battalion from the 58th Independent Motorized Infantry Brigade of the operational command "North". In April 2019, Lieutenant Colonel Huliaiev congratulated personnel and presented certificates and commemorative badges of the motorized infantry battalion and other military ranks in Shostka, on the occasion of the celebration of the 5th anniversary of the battalion's creation. On 8 May 2019, on the Day of Remembrance and Reconciliation in Shostka, he presented veterans of the war against Russian aggression with honorary badges of the battalion.

Huliaiev then served in the 93rd Mechanized Brigade. Later, he held the position of chief of staff of the 28th Mechanized Brigade, and in September 2021 he was appointed commander of the 28th brigade. He received a master's degree from Taras Shevchenko Luhansk National University in Starobilsk. He was awarded the "Cold Ravine" award.

Since February 2022, with the beginning of the Russian military invasion of Ukraine, Vitaly Huliaiev at the head of the 28th Mechanized Brigade was on the front line, stopping the advance of Russian troops in the south of Ukraine.

Huliaiev died on 23 July 2022 on the outskirts of Mykolaiv as a result of a rocket attack on a command post. His funeral took place on 26 July 2022 at the Odesa Military Academy. The service also commemorated three lieutenant colonels; Oleksandr Deinek, Valentin Sergiyenko and Vitaly Bondarev, who died on 23 July together with the commander. The ceremony was attended by city and regional leaders, including the commander of the operational command "South" Major General Andrii Kovalchuk, the fifth president of Ukraine Petro Poroshenko, the former acting President of Ukraine Oleksandr Turchynov, and others.

== Awards ==
Huliaiev was posthumously awarded the Order of Bohdan Khmelnytsky III degree on 4 August 2022, "for personal courage and selfless actions shown in the defense of the state sovereignty and territorial integrity of Ukraine, loyalty to the military oath."

== Commemoration ==
On 4 August 2022, at a session of the Kuialnyk Rural Hromada council, a decision was made to rename Miska Street in the village of Kuialnyk to Vitaliia Huliaieva Street. The street received a new name in honor of the commander of the 28th Separate Mechanized Brigade. 21 deputies voted for the idea of perpetuating the memory of Colonel Huliaiev, the decision was adopted unanimously. On 9 August 2022, the press service of the Yuzhne City Council reported that a public discussion had begun on renaming streets in two settlements after Vitalii Huliaiev. They plan to rename Zhovtneva Street in Novi Biliari and Tsvetaeva Street in the village of Sychavka, Odesa Oblast. On 18 August 2022, a street and a lane in the town of Berezivka, Odesa Oblast, were renamed after Huliaiev.
