= Ihor Molotok =

Ukrainian politician

- Ігор Молоток
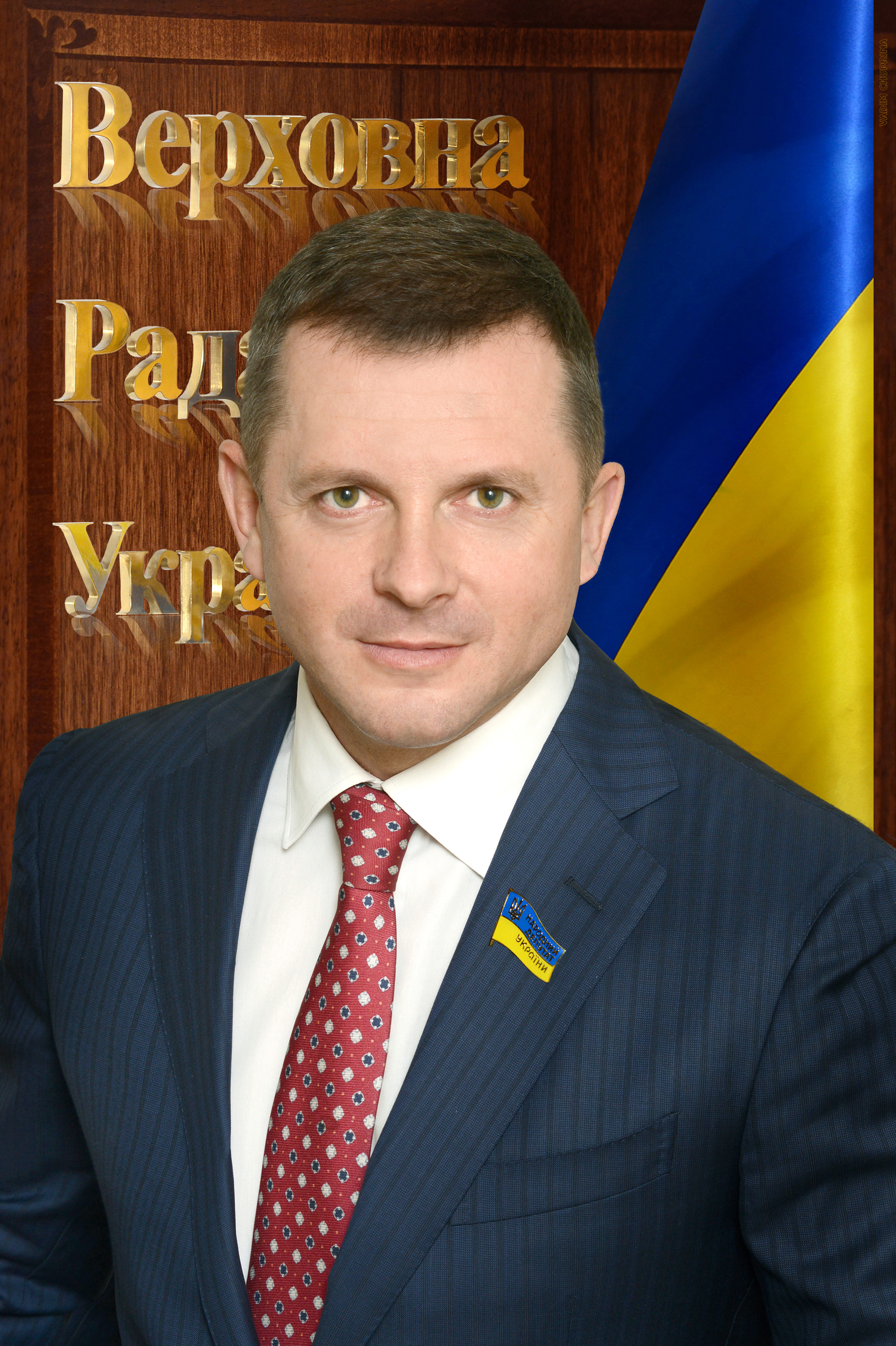

People's Deputy of Ukraine
- Incumbent
- Assumed office 12 December 2012
- Preceded by: Constituency established
- Constituency: Sumy Oblast, No. 160

Personal details
- Born: 4 September 1967 (age 59) Shostka, Ukrainian SSR, Soviet Union (now Ukraine)
- Party: Independent
- Other political affiliations: Party of Regions (until 2014); People's Will (2014–2019)
- Education: Sumy State University

Military service
- Allegiance: Ukraine
- Branch/service: Territorial Defence Forces
- Years of service: 2022–present
- Battles/wars: 2022 Russian invasion of Ukraine

Ihor Fedorovych Molotok (Ukrainian: Ігор Федорович Молоток; born 4 September 1967) is a Ukrainian politician currently serving as a People's Deputy of Ukraine from Ukraine's 160th electoral district since 12 December 2012. He is currently an independent member of the For the Future parliamentary group, previously having been part of People's Will and the Party of Regions.

== Early life and career ==
Ihor Fedorovych Molotok was born on 4 September 1967 in the city of Shostka, in Ukraine's northern Sumy Oblast. He graduated from Sumy State University in 1995, specialising in industrial electronics. Beforehand, he worked as an electrician from 1985 to 1993, and was deputy director of Bybir TOV in Shostka from 1993 to 1997. Following his graduation, he also became deputy director of the Shostka-based VIST TOV, where he remained until 2005. He was also deputy director at NEKS Ltd. in Shostka from 2000 to 2003. After leaving NEKS, he became general director of Vant Ltd., serving in that position until 2012.

From 2006 to 2012, Molotok was head of the supervisory board of Shotska Thermal Power Plant.

== Political career ==
Molotok was first elected to the Verkhovna Rada (parliament of Ukraine) in the 2012 Ukrainian parliamentary election, being elected as a People's Deputy of Ukraine from Ukraine's 160th electoral district. In this election, he was an independent. He was successfully elected, winning 31.50% of the vote. The next-closest competitor, Mykola Noha of the Party of Regions, only won 17.20%.

Following his election, Molotok joined the Party of Regions faction in the Verkhovna Rada. He was one of the supporters of the anti-protest laws pushed by the government of Viktor Yanukovych in an attempt to crush the Euromaidan protests. On 27 February 2014, Molotok left the Party of Regions faction and joined the Sovereign European Ukraine parliamentary group.

Molotok was re-elected in the 2014 Ukrainian parliamentary election, again running as an independent candidate in the 160th electoral district. He was re-elected, winning 46.15% of the vote compared to his closest opponent, Ivan Borshosh (of the Petro Poroshenko Bloc), who won 29.94% of the vote. In the Verkhovna Rada, he joined the People's Will parliamentary group, a renamed form of Sovereign European Ukraine. He was chair of the social programmes subcommittee of the Verkhovna Rada Budget Committee.

During the 2019 Ukrainian parliamentary election, Molotok was once again re-elected from the 160th electoral district. This time, he won 35.15% against 22.30% of the vote gathered by his next-closest competitor, Tetiana Sakhniuk of Servant of the People. He became a member of the Verkhovna Rada Budget Committee. In July 2020 he joined the For the Future parliamentary group.

=== Criticism ===
Molotok has been accused by anti-corruption non-governmental organisation Chesno of engaging in piano voting, and is involved in multiple anti-corruption investigations.

On 28 June 2019, following a beating which left him hospitalised, former Konotop mayor Artem Seminikhin accused Molotok of organising the assault. Molotok denied any involvement, and requested a polygraph test in order to prove his innocence.

On 5 April 2022, following the beginning of the 2022 Russian invasion of Ukraine, Molotok came into conflict with Okhtyrka mayor Pavlo Kuzmenko after the latter accused Molotok of bypassing a 300-400 metre pontoon crossing and punching him after being confronted. Molotok denied that any such thing had happened, claiming that he was working alongside the Armed Forces of Ukraine in his position as a member of the Territorial Defence Forces.
