= Oleksandrivka, Kherson Raion, Kherson Oblast =

Village in Kherson Oblast, Ukraine

Oleksandrivka Олександрівка
- Village
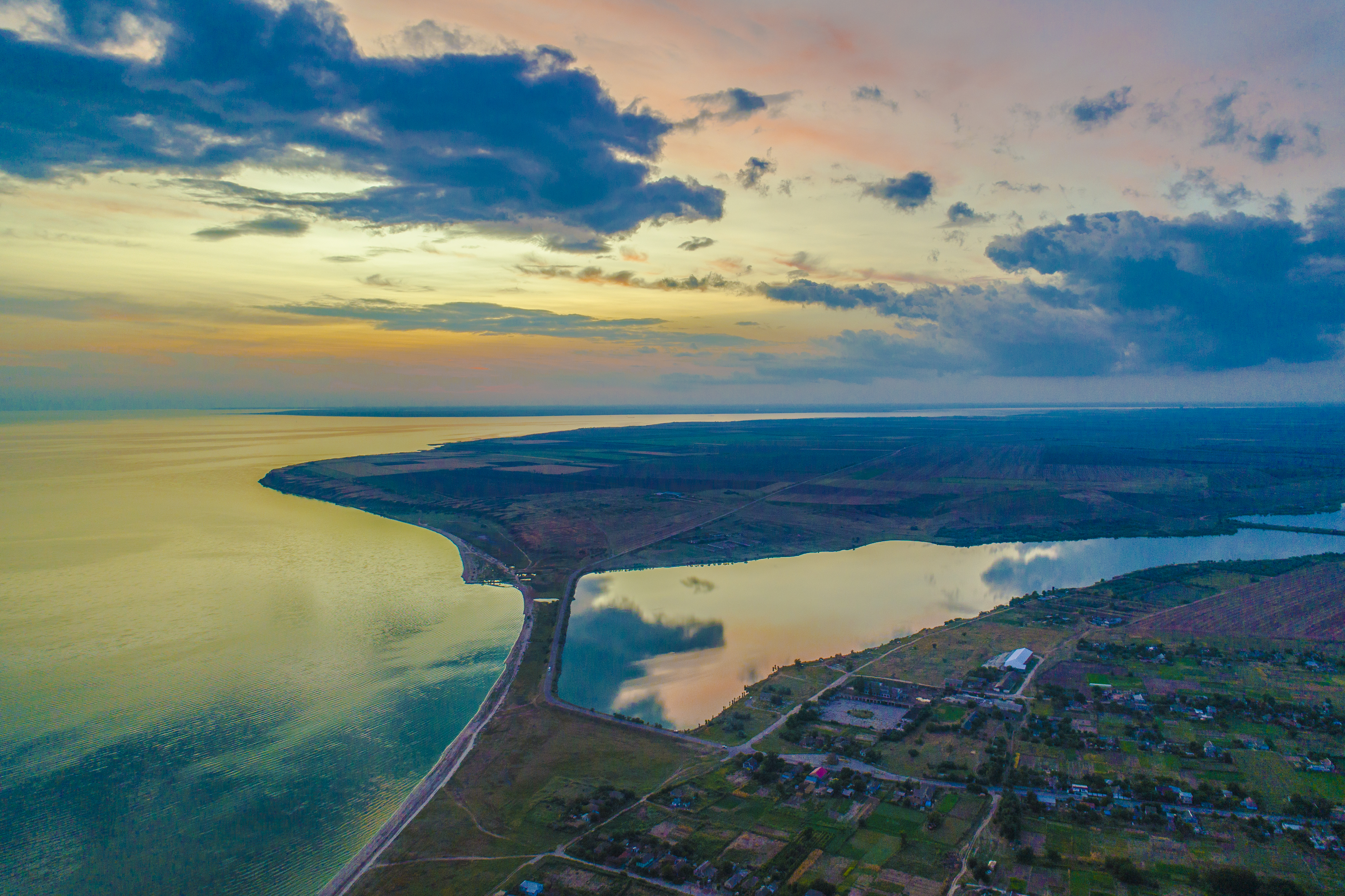
- The western edge of the village (foreground), the Dnieper–Bug estuary (left) and lake (center right)
- Interactive map of Oleksandrivka
- Location of Oleksandrivka Oleksandrivka (Ukraine)
- Coordinates: 46°36′54″N 32°6′41″E
- Country: Ukraine
- Oblast: Kherson Oblast
- Raion: Kherson Raion
- Hromada: Stanislav rural hromada
- Settlement: 1754

Government
  - Head of town Council: Kamenetska Natalia Oleksandrivna

Area
  - Village: 4.611 km^{2} (1.780 sq mi)

Population (2001 census)
  - Village: 2,596
  - Density: 563.0/km^{2} (1,458/sq mi)
  - Metro: Kherson
- Time zone: UTC+2 (EET)
  - Summer (DST): UTC+3 (EEST)
- Postal code: 75050
- Area code: +380 5547
- Climate: Cfa
- Website: https://stanislavskaotg.dosvit.org.ua/

Oleksandrivka (Ukrainian: Олександрівка) is a village in Kherson Raion, Kherson Oblast, southern Ukraine. It has formerly been called Bublykov, Nyzhni Solonets, Kashov, Shtykhov, and Miloradovich. The population was approximately 2,596 people.

== Administrative status ==
Until 18 July 2020, Oleksandrivka was located in the Bilozerka Raion. The raion was abolished in July 2020 as part of the administrative reform of Ukraine, which reduced the number of raions of Kherson Oblast to five. The area of Bilozerka Raion was merged into Kherson Raion.

== Geography ==
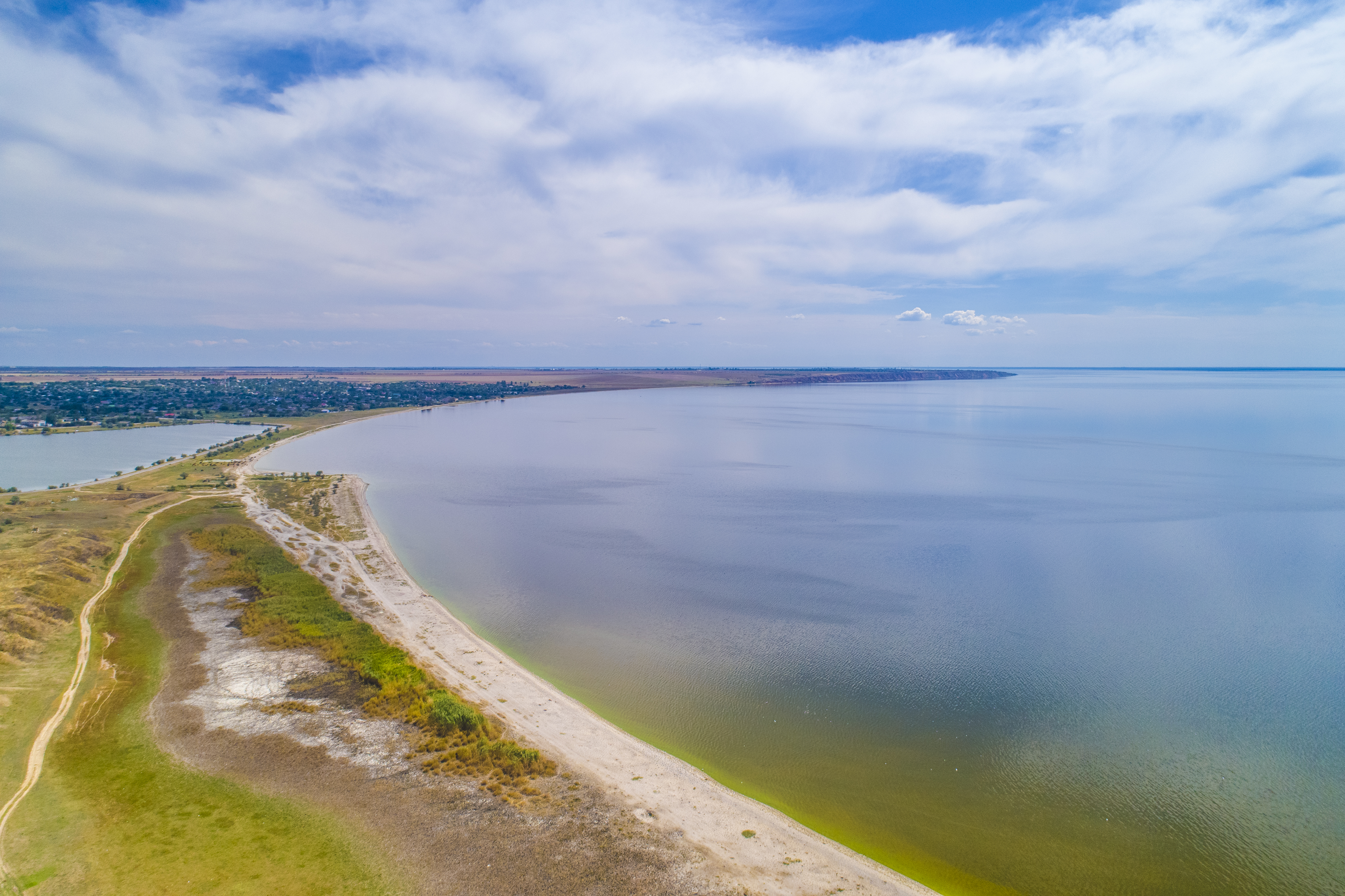
The eastern end of the landscape reserve, the lake (left) and village (left distant)

The village is on the shore of the Dnieper–Bug estuary, an inlet of the Black Sea. A lake at the western end of the village is separated from the estuary by a narrow strip of land with a road running along it. Beyond the lake, the coastal strip is part of the 996-hectare Oleksandrivka protected landscape area of national importance, which was created in 2002.

== History ==
Oleksandrivka is located near the suburbs of Olbia Pontica, an ancient Greek colony on the mouth of the river Borysthenes. The ruins of the colony were discovered in 1895 by Viktor Goshkevych and were excavated systematically by the National Academy of Sciences of Ukraine.

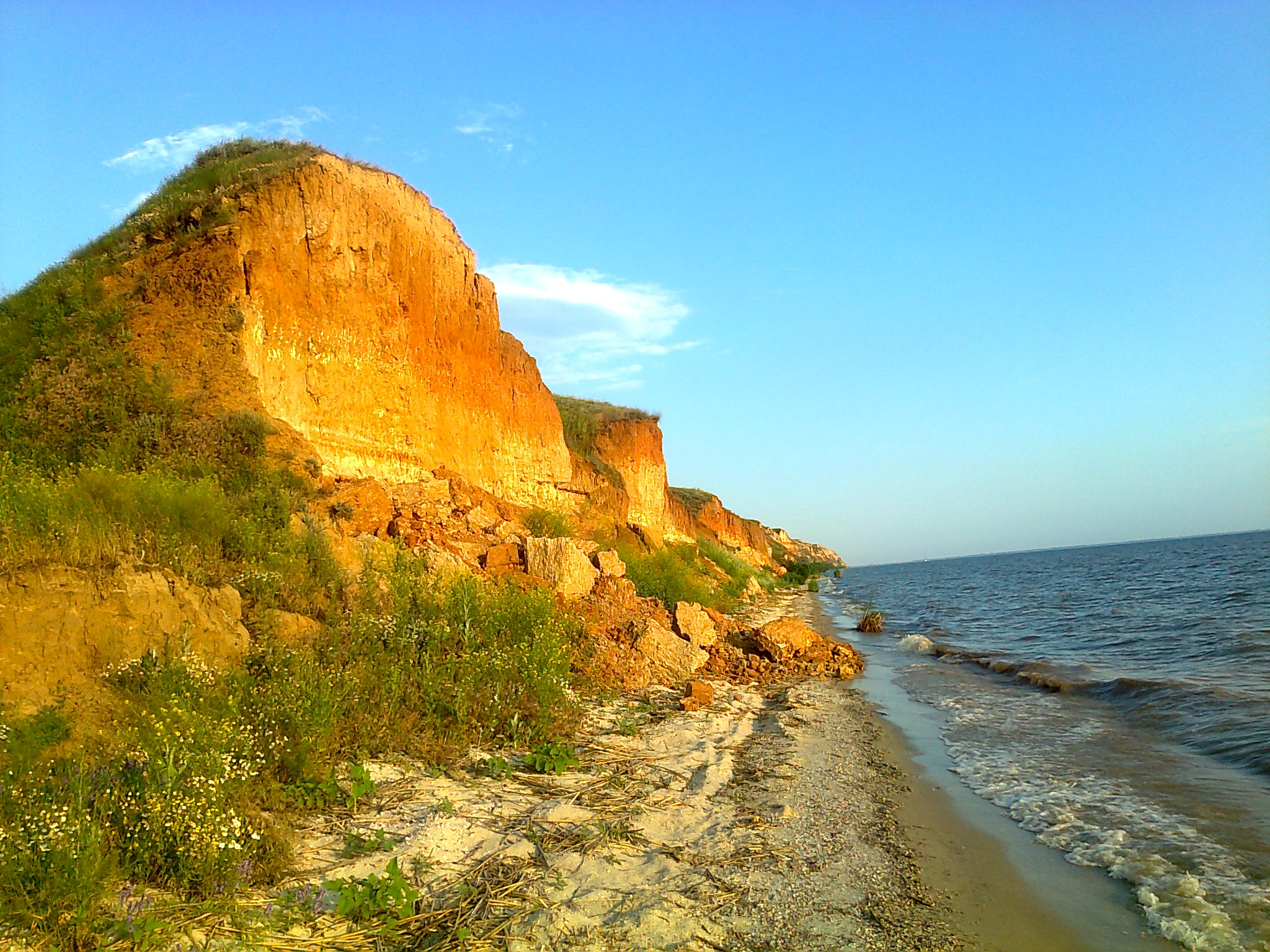
Oleksandrivka Natural Reserve

In 1754, the village of Oleksandrivka was founded by the Cossacks. There were winter quarters and fish factories (called Sapetnya), where the Cossacks were engaged in fishing and extracting salt from the Dnieper–Bug liman (estuary).

In 1781, the estate of Russian general Pyotr Rumyantsev had surrounded the earlier Cossack settlement, and a formal village was proclaimed.

Several important battles of the Russo-Turkish War of 1787–1792 took place in the liman next to Oleksandrivka. These battles included the Dnieper Flotilla, John Paul Jones's deep-water fleet, and the Ottoman Navy, which fought in the First Battle of the Liman on June 7, 1788, and the Second Battle of the Liman on June 16–17.

In 1918, the village became part of Ukrainian People's Republic. With the failure of the Ukrainian War of Independence, the village became part of the Soviet Union. In 2015, during nationwide decommunization, a statue of Vladimir Lenin was torn down by an unknown person.

=== 2022 Russian invasion of Ukraine ===
During the 2022 Russian invasion of Ukraine, Oleksandrivka changed hands multiple times due to its location between the cities of Mykolaiv and Kherson. The area was primarily defended by Ukraine's 28th Mechanized Brigade. As a result of the village's location on the front line, 90% of its buildings were destroyed.

== Demographics ==
As of the 2001 Ukrainian census, Oleksandrivka had a population of 2,596 inhabitants. The linguistic composition of the population in the settlement was as follows:

Native languages in Oleksandrivka
| | percent |
| Ukrainian | 90.7% |
| Russian | 8.6% |
| Armenian | 0.2% |
| Romanian | 0.2% |
| Belarusian | 0.2% |
| others | 0.1% |
