= 28th Mechanized Brigade =

Ukrainian Ground Forces unit

28th Mechanized Brigade (2016–present) 28th Guards Mechanized Brigade (2001–2016) 28th Guards Motor Rifle Division (1957–2001) 28th Guards Rifle Division (1942–1957)
- Ukrainian: 28-ма окрема механізована бригада
- 28th Mechanized Brigade shoulder sleeve insignia
- Active: 1942–present
- Country: Soviet Union (1930s–1991); CIS (1991–1992); Ukraine (1992–present)
- Branch: Ukrainian Ground Forces
- Type: Mechanized Infantry
- Size: Brigade
- Part of: Operational Command South
- Garrison/HQ: Chornomorske; Odesa Oblast, Ukraine
- Patron: Knights of the First Winter Campaign
- Mottos: With Will and Iron
- Engagements: World War II; War in Donbas; Battle in Shakhtarsk Raion; Russian invasion of Ukraine; Southern Ukraine offensive; Liberation of Kherson; Battle of Donbas; Battle of Bakhmut; Battle of Kostiantynivka
- Decorations: For Courage and Bravery

Commanders
- Current commander: Yuriy Madyar
- Notable commanders: Vitalii Huliaiev (2021-22) †

Insignia
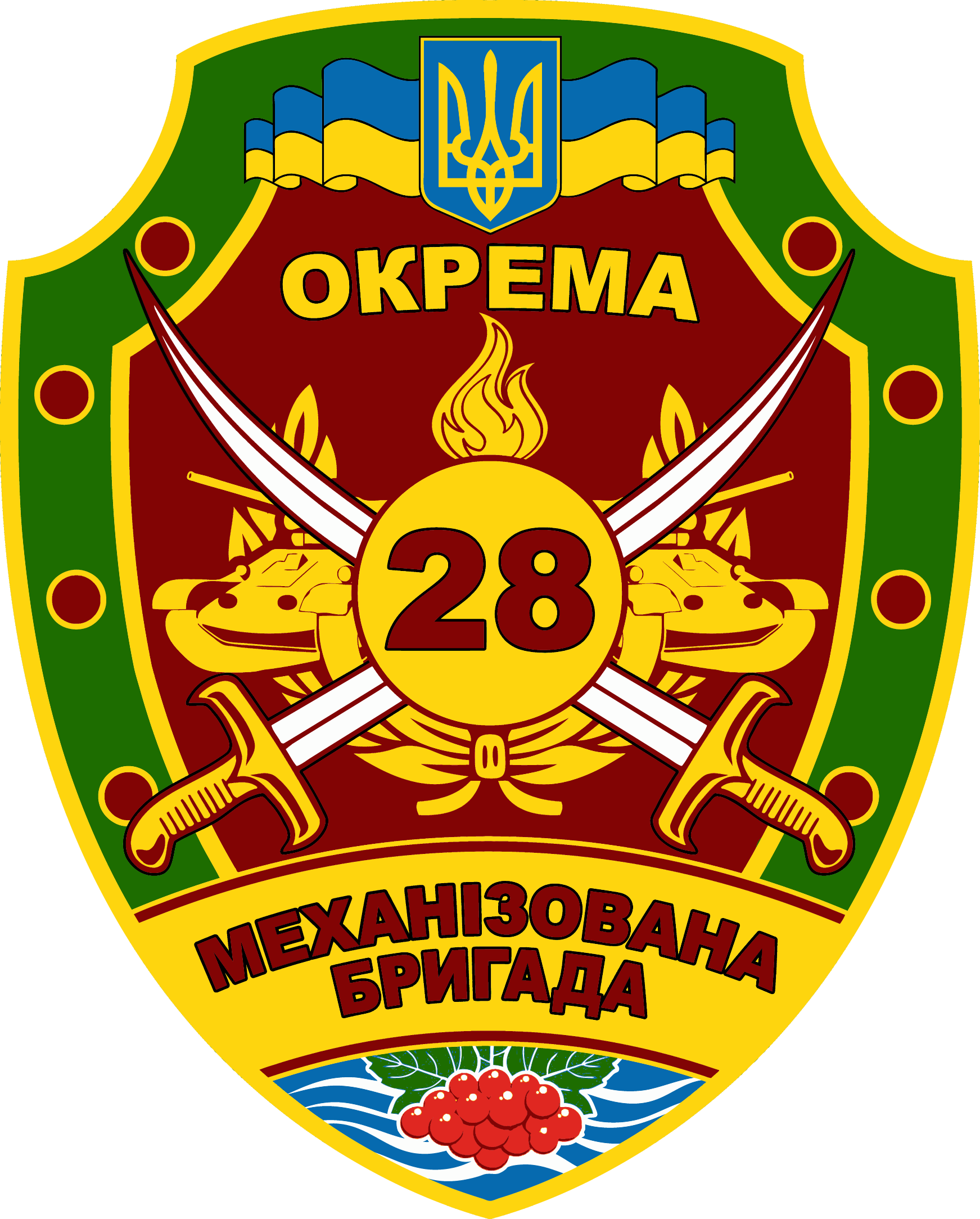
- Former insignia (1992-2015)

The 28th Mechanized Brigade (Ukrainian: 28-ма окрема механізо́вана брига́да імені Лицарів Зимового Походу) is a mechanized brigade and part of the formation of the Ukrainian Ground Forces.

== History ==
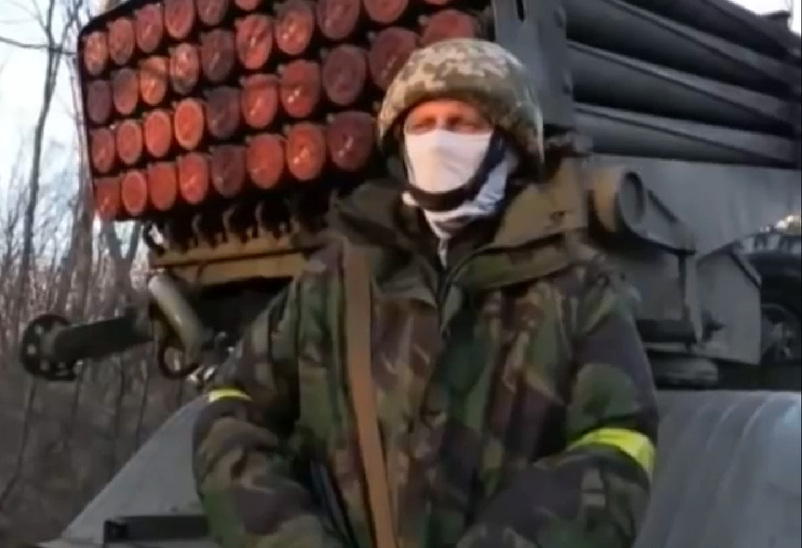
Soldier of the 28th Brigade by a BM-21 Grad multiple rocket launcher during the War in Donbas, November 2014

The original 28th Guards Rifle Division was formed during the Second World War from the 180th Rifle Division in May 1942. The division fought at Kharkiv and Iași. It was with the 37th Army in Bulgaria in May 1945. During the 1980s, the then 28th Guards Motor Rifle Division was part of the 14th Guards Army headquartered at Chișinău, in the Moldavian SSR (Odesa Military District). After the fall of the Soviet Union it became part of the reorganised Ukrainian 6th Army Corps.

The current brigade was established in 1998 on the base of the 89th Guards Rifle Regiment of the Soviet Army. That unit in its turn traced its roots from the 21st Rifle Regiment of the Red Army, which was formed in 1940 from veterans of Estonian Land Forces following the that country's annexation by the Soviet Union. The regiment took part in the battles for Kharkiv, and following World War II was based in Chornomorske near Odesa, becoming part of the Armed Forces of Ukraine in 1992.

After the 6th Army Corps was disbanded in 2013, the brigade became part of Operational Command South.

The brigade fought in the war in Donbas. On 22 August 2016, its Guards title was removed. On 22 August 2019 by decree of President Volodymyr Zelenskyy the official name of the brigade became: 28th Separate Mechanized Brigade named after the Knights of the First Winter Campaign.

=== Russian invasion of Ukraine ===
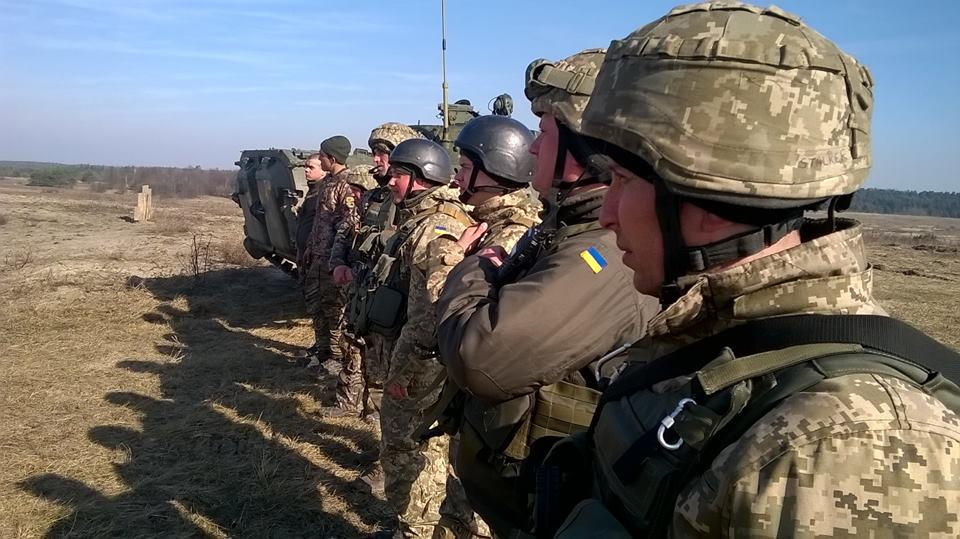
28th Brigade soldiers in a military exercise, 2017

The brigade took part in the defense of Ukraine during the Russian invasion of Ukraine on the southern front. According to the chairman of the Public Council at the Odesa Regional State Administration Serhiy Bratchuk, the Russians tried to conduct a maritime and air landing in Kobleve on the Black Sea coast of the Mykolaiv area. As a result of the brigade, the Russians' attempt to land was stopped, and they retreated, losing up to 25 soldiers. Two more saboteurs were detained in the village of Kobleve. After the defense of Kobleve, elements of the 28th Brigade took part in the defense of Voznesensk.

The brigade defended the Oleksandrivka and Posad-Pokrovske sectors of the front line between Kherson and Mykolaiv throughout 2022. On July 23, 2022, the commander of the brigade, Vitalii Huliaiev, was killed in Mykolaiv region.

On 10 November, the 28th Brigade reportedly captured Kyselivka. Two days later, on the 12th of November, elements of the brigade were seen entering Kherson as part of the liberation of the city during the southern offensive.

Elements of the brigade were also present in the battle of Bakhmut as of February 2023, with servicemen interviewed by CNN and portrayed by The New Yorker. Between November 2022 and January 2023, a battalion of the 28th Mechanized Brigade numbering 600 men was reported to have been almost annihilated fighting in a village south of Bakhmut, with around 70 soldiers said to have been encircled and massacred in one incident.

The Brigade's artillery battalion has been observed using M109A4BE self-propelled howitzers to provide supporting fire to other elements of the 28th Brigade fighting in and around the city of Kostiantynivka as of August 2025 by United24.

The drone reconnaissance unit "Madyar's Birds", led by Robert "Madyar" Brovdi was absorbed into the brigade at some point during the war.

== Structure ==
As of 2024, the brigade's structure was as follows:

- 28th Mechanized Brigade, Chornomorske
  - Headquarters & Headquarters Company
  - 1st Mechanized Battalion
  - 2nd Mechanized Battalion
  - 3rd Mechanized Battalion
  - 5th Reserve Battalion
  - Detachment South of Ukrainian Volunteer Army
  - Tank Battalion
  - Artillery Battalion
    - Headquarters & Target Acquisition Battery
    - Self-propelled Artillery Battery (M109)
    - Self-propelled Artillery Battery (PzH 2000)
    - Rocket Artillery Battery (BM-27 Uragan)
    - Anti-tank Artillery Battery (100 mm anti-tank gun T-12)
  - Anti-Aircraft Defense Battery
  - Reconnaissance Company
  - Mobile Assault Unit "Kurt & Company"
  - Attack Drone Company
  - Engineer Battalion
  - Engineering Support Group
  - Maintenance Battalion
  - Logistic Battalion
  - Sniper Company
  - Electronic Warfare Company
  - Signal Company
  - Radar Company
  - Chemical, Biological, Radiological and Nuclear Defense Company
  - Medical Company
