= Victor Planchon =

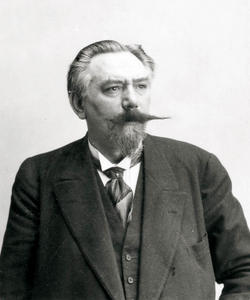
Victor Planchon (date unknown)

Victor Joseph Planchon (12 January 1863, Paris - 1 February 1935, Lyon) was a French chemist. He worked with the Lumière brothers to develop a celluloid emulsion process.

== Biography ==
At the age of fifteen, he joined the staff at a government laboratory in Paris; doing work for the patent office and customs. It was there that he learned chemistry and photography. In 1887, after a short stay at a similar laboratory in Arras, he went to Boulogne-sur-Mer, where he later became Director of the Port Control Laboratory.

Originally interested in photographic plates, he switched to studying celluloid; attempting to create a completely flat surface. The solution involved self-tensioning frames, similar to those used for the glass plates. His technique was so successful that he founded a company to produce the new film: the Union Photographique de Boulogne. He was already acquainted with Louis Lumière so, after a meeting in Paris, he took a roll of the new film to Lyon, where the Lumières were inspired to create the cinematograph. This was followed by a contract between the two companies. The Lumières would use his film exclusively, and he would produce his film with their "Blue Label" plate emulsifier.

Shortly after, he settled in Lyon and established the "Société anonyme des Pellicules françaises", known as PLAVIC (PLAnchon VICtor). Through 1914, the company supplied millions of meters of film. To achieve this level of production, he built three groups of factories in Feyzin, which were capable of producing 40,000 meters per day, as well as preparing the necessary raw materials,

Following World War I, competition from the Pathé factories in Vincennes led Planchon to convert some of his factory output to the production of artificial silk, under the direction of Henri Lumière, as he had no descendants of his own.

In 2012, the city of Boulogne-sur-Mer established the "Place Victor-Planchon". Two statues have been installed there; one of Planchon and one of Marilyn Monroe.
