= Tasma =

Russian photographic material manufacturer

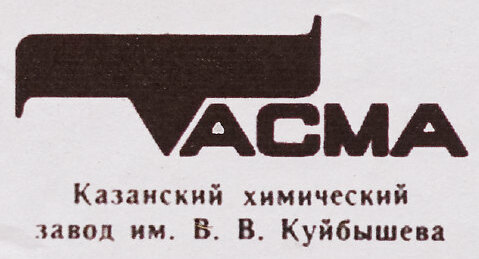
- Type: Public
- Industry: Photographic material manufacturer
- Headquarters: Kazan, Russia
- Area served: Primarily Russia, CIS countries, but also abroad
- Key people: Albert Karimov – Chairman of Board of Dir.'s & Evgeniy Latinskiy Dir. General
- Products: Photosensitized materials
- Website: tasma.ru

Tasma (Russian: Тасма) is a Russian GOST and ISO certified manufacturer of black-and-white and colour photographic films. It also manufactures adhesive tape and demineralized water. Located in Kazan, Russia, it has been in operation since 1933 (starting as "Film Factory No. 8"). The name Tasma is derived from the Russian phrase Татарские светочувствительные материалы ("Tatarskie Sveto Materialiy"), meaning "Tatar Sensitized Materials"; this name was adopted by the company in 1974.

During World War II, only Film Factory No. 8 of Kazan remained in operation, supplying the entirety of domestic Soviet photographic material for the war effort. For this effort, it was awarded a medal for the Order of the Red Banner of Labor in 1944.

The company manufactures black and white negative films KN-1, KN-2, and KN-3, which are popular with photographers in Russia as well as motion picture cinematographers internationally. The company provides its films in 16mm, 35mm, and 70mm formats.

Prior to the fall of the Soviet Union, the company offered an array of color photographic products from the year 1950 as well, but these were discontinued following the fall of the Iron Curtain.

After the dissolution of the Soviet Union, the company was reorganized as a free enterprise and privatized in 1992.
