= List of discontinued photographic films =

All the still camera films on this page have either been discontinued, have been updated or the company making the film no longer exists. Often films will be updated and older versions discontinued without any change in the name. Films are listed by brand name.

Photographic films for still cameras that are currently available are in the list of photographic films. Films for movie making are included in the list of motion picture film stocks.

== ADOX ==
Adox was a German camera and film brand of Fotowerke Dr. C. Schleussner GmbH of Frankfurt am Main, the world's first photographic materials manufacturer. In the 1950s it launched its revolutionary thin layer sharp black and white KB 14 and 17 films, referred to by US distributors as the 'German wonder film'. In the 1970s Dupont the new owners of the ADOX brand sold the recipes and machinery of the film (but not the brand name) to Fotokemika from Yugoslavia who continued to produce the films according to the 1950s ADOX formulas under the Efke brand.

=== Black and white film ===
1952 onward films had designations: KB – Kleinbild (small format 135), R – Rollfilm (120, 127), PL – Planfilm (sheet film).

Make	Name	Dates	Base	ISO	Process	Type	Details	Origin	Formats	Replaced by
Schleussner	Tempo-Rot	20-30s ?		16	B&W	Print	Fine-grain orthochromatic roll film. Speed of 23° Scheiner.	Germany	116, 118, 120, 127, 129	?
Schleussner	Tempo-Gold	20-30s ?		32	B&W	Print	Fine-grain orthochromatic non-curling film. Speed of 26° Scheiner.	Germany	120	?
Schleussner	Tempo-Pan	~1940 ?			B&W	Print		Germany		?
Schleussner	ADOX-21	~1939		100	B&W	Print		Germany		?
ADOX	KB 14 / R 14	1952–1973	T	20	B&W	Print	Ortho-panchromatic classic 1950s single layer emulsion.	Germany	135, 120	Nothing
ADOX	KB 17 / R 17 / PL 17	1952–1973	T	40	B&W	Print	Ortho-panchromatic classic 1950s emulsion.	Germany	135, 120, sheet film	Nothing
ADOX	KB 21 / R 21 / PL 21	1952–1973	T	100	B&W	Print	Panchromatic classic 1950s emulsion.	Germany	135, 120, 129, sheet film	Nothing
ADOX	R 25	?–?	T	250	B&W	Print	High speed panchromatic film.	Germany	120	?
ADOX	KB 27 / R 27	?–1973	T	400	B&W	Print	Very high speed panchromatic film.	Germany	135, 120	Nothing
ADOX	ADOX R 18 O Orthochromatic	~1955 ?		50	B&W	Print				
ADOX	ADOX R 18 P Panchromatic	~1955 ?		50	B&W	Print				
ADOX	ADOX R 21 P Panchromatic	50s ?		100	B&W	Print				
ADOX	ADOX R 21 PM Panchromatic	50s ?		100	B&W	Print	Matte film			

=== Color reversal (slide) film ===
Make	Name	Dates	Base	ISO	Process	Type	Details	Origin	Formats	Replaced by
ADOX	C 15	1958-1960	T	25	ADOX	Slide	General purpose slide film for daylight. Processing done by ADOX.	Germany	135	C 18
ADOX	C 18	1960-1964	T	50	ADOX	Slide	General purpose slide film for daylight. Processing done by ADOX.	Germany	135-36	Nothing
ADOX	Adox Color CNT Positive	1955-1958				Slide	Agfa CNT ???			
ADOX	Adox Color NC16 Positive	1958				Slide				

=== Color negative film ===
Make	Name	Dates	Base	ISO	Process	Type	Details	Origin	Formats	Replaced by
ADOX	NC 17	1956-1964	T	40	E-NC	Print	General purpose color negative film. Could be developed at home with ADOX E-NC kit.	Germany	135	?
ADOX	Adox Color KB-CNT Negative	50s- 60s				Print	Agfa CNT ???			
ADOX	Adox Color R-CNT Negative	50s- 60s				Print	Agfa CNT ???			
ADOX	Adox Color T	1955 ?- 1964 ?				Print				
ADOX	Adox Negativ Color 40 ASA	1956 ?				Print				

== ADOX (Fotoimpex) ==
The current rights to the ADOX name for photographic products were obtained in 2003 by Fotoimpex of Berlin, Germany, a company founded in 1992 to import photographic films and papers from former eastern Europe. This included the Efke films from Fotokemika which were sold branded as 'ADOX CHS Art' re-uniting the ADOX name with the original Schleussner film formula. Fotoimpex established the ADOX Fotowerke GmbH film factory in Bad Saarow outside Berlin to convert and package their films, papers and chemicals. After the closure of Fotokemika in 2012, ADOX subsequently revived the KB100 film as ADOX CHS II.

=== Black and white negative film ===
Make	Name	Dates	Base	ISO	Process	Type	Details	Origin	Formats	Replaced by
ADOX	Adox CHS Ortho 25	1990-2012		25	B&W	Print		Fotokemika/Samobor		
ADOX	ADOX Ortho 25			25	B&W	Print	Efke Ortho 25 ?			
ADOX	ADOX Ortho CT	~2009 ?			B&W	Print	High resolution technical film with a normal grade			
ADOX	IR-HR PRO 50	2018–2021	P	80	B&W	Print	Super-panchromatic fine grain film – Agfa-Gevaert Aviphot 80 as HR-50 without modification. Initial trial batch	Belgium/ Germany	135-36	Nothing
ADOX	Silvermax	2016–2020	T	100	B&W	Print	Fine grain ortho-panchromatic film on a clear triacetate base similar to original AGFA APX 100. The film was produced as a single run using end of line Agfa base material and photochemicals in 135 format only. SCALA was the same film but packaged to promote its suitability for reversal. Final stock sold out in late 2020/early 2021.	Germany	135-36	Nothing

=== Black and white reversal (slide) film ===
Make	Name	Dates	Base	ISO	Process	Type	Details	Origin	Formats	Replaced by
ADOX	SCALA 160	2016–2020	T	160	B&W	Slide	Same film as the Silvermax but rebranded to show its suitability for reversal process. A near alternative to the discontinued AGFA SCALA.Final stock sold out in late 2020/early 2021. The replacement film SCALA 50 is based on modified Agfa-Gevaert Aviphot Pan 80	Germany	135-36	SCALA 50

=== Color negative film ===
Make	Name	Dates	Base	ISO	Process	Type	Details	Origin	Formats	Replaced by
ADOX	Color Implosion	2012–2017	T	100	C-41	Print	Adox Color Implosion C-IMPL "creative" color film, designed to intentionally give unpredictable results with skewed colors. Adox (and InovisCoat for coating?)	Germany	135-36	Nothing

== Agfa ==
Originally founded in Berlin, 1867, this company became known as Agfa (Actien-Gesellschaft für Anilin-Fabrikation) in 1873. The Wolfen factory was established in 1910 and the original Leverkusen works around the same time. By 1925 under IG Farben, the Wolfen plant was specializing in film production and the Leverkusen plant photographic paper. After the war, Agfa was split into two companies: Agfa AG in Leverkusen, West Germany, and VEB Film- und Chemiefaserwerk Agfa Wolfen in East Germany. Initially both companies produced film under the Agfa brand with the same names, such as Isopan F. To distinguish them, the film edge markings were L IF for Agfa Leverkusen, and W IF for Agfa Wolfen. After 1964 films from Wolfen were rebranded ORWO (ORiginal WOlfen). (See separate listing). Trading of materials however continued between plants.

Agfa AG (Leverkusen), which saw major investment post war in 1952 as a wholly owned subsidiary of Bayer, subsequently merged with Gevaert based in Mortsel, Belgium, in 1964 to form Agfa-Gevaert with Bayer subsequently acquiring full ownership of the merged company. Agfa-Gevaert film products continued to be sold under the Agfa 'rhombus' brand. The Mortsel plant specialized in commercial film, including aerial photography film, and Leverkusen in consumer film. Following a public flotation in 1999, Agfa-Gevaert Group became independent from Bayer. The consumer film division was spun off into a new company AgfaPhoto in 2004 in a management buyout, a time of significant challenges to the traditional film market with the rapid rise of digital photography, resulting in bankruptcy in 7 months, and the closure of the Leverkusen plant in 2005. Production of aerial film continued at the plant in Mortsel, some of which have been subsequently converted for retail sale by Maco Photo Products.

=== Black and white films ===
Make	Name	Dates	Base	ISO	Process	Type	Details	Origin	Formats	Replaced by
Agfa	Isopan FF / IFF	c1935–c1968	T	16	B&W	Print	Ultra fine grain panchromatic film. Initially sold only in 135 format and with speed of 10/10° DIN. Speed increased to 13° DIN after WWII. Leverkusen version also referred to as Isopan IFF, marginal markings L IFF.	Germany	135, 127, 120, 620, Sheet film	Nothing
Agfa	Isochrom F	c1933–1960s	T	32-50	B&W	Print	Fine grain orthochromatic film. Roll films had initially speed of 16/10° DIN, later increased to 18/10° DIN. Other formats had speed of 17/10° DIN.	Germany	135, Karat, 127, 117, 129, 120, 620, 116	Nothing
Agfa	Isopan F / IF	c1935–c1979	T	40	B&W	Print	Fine grain panchromatic film. Leverkusen version also referred to as Isopan IF 17, marginal markings L IF.	Germany	135, Karat, Rapid, 127, 117, 129, 120, 620	Nothing
Agfa	Isopan Super Special / ISS	1935–c1980	T	100	B&W	Print	'Super Special' Introduced around 1935 as a replacement for Superpan. For correct rendering a pale yellow filter was required in daylight and a pale green in half-watt illumination. Fine grain ortho-panchromatic film. Leverkusen version also referred to as Isopan ISS 21, marginal markings L ISS. Last stocks expired Jan 1980.	Germany	135, Karat, Rapid, 127, 117, 120, 620, 116	Isopan 21
Agfa	Isopan Ultra / ISU	c1935–c1979	T	250-400	B&W	Print	High speed panchromatic film for short exposures. Initially 23/10° DIN, later increased to 25° DIN. Sensitive to overexposure and overdevelopment, which result in coarse grain. Speed increased to ISO 400/27° in the 70s.	Germany	135, Karat, 127, 120, Sheet film	Nothing
Agfa	Isopan Record / IR	mid-1950s–c1968	T	n/a	B&W	Print	Ultra high speed (for its time) panchromatic film. If developed properly, surpsingly fine grain results could be obtained. Best results for subjects with normal contrast were obtained at EI 1250/32° and with high contrast subjects at EI 640/29°.	Germany	135, 127, 120, 620, Sheet film	Nothing
Agfa	Isopan	c1966–c1985	T	125	B&W	Print	General purpose panchromatic film. Slightly faster version of Isopan ISS. Initially sold in 126 cartridges. Other formats later replaced Isopan 21.	Germany	126, 135, 127, 120	Nothing
Agfa	Isopan 21	c1975–c1981	T	100	B&W	Print	General purpose panchromatic film. 110 film sold as "Isopan Pocket Special".	Germany	110-20, 135, Rapid	Isopan
Professional films:
Agfa	Isopan Portrait / IP	?–1960s	T	100	B&W	Print	Professional film for portraiture sold with glossy or matte base.	Germany	Sheet film	Agfapan 200 Professional
Agfa	Agfacontour Professional	1970–c2002	T	40	B&W	Print	Equidensities generating process B&W sheet film using Agfacontour developer.	Germany	135, 120, Sheet film	Nothing
Agfa	Agfaortho 25 Professional	c1968–c1989	T	25	B&W	Print	Professional ultra fine-grain orthochromatic film.	Germany	135, 120, Sheet film	Nothing
Agfa	Agfapan 25 Professional	1968–c1989	T/P	25	B&W	Print	Professional general purpose traditional cubic grain panchromatic film. Sheet film P base.	Germany	135, 120, Sheet film	Agfapan APX 25
Agfa	Agfapan 100 Professional	1968–c1989	T/P	100	B&W	Print	Professional general purpose traditional cubic grain panchromatic film. Roll film and sheet film were sold with matte or glossy back. Sheet film P base.	Germany	135, 120, Sheet film	Agfapan APX 100
Agfa	Agfapan 200 Professional	1968–c1989	P	200	B&W	Print	Professional sheet film for portraiture. Sold with matte or glossy back.	Germany	Sheet film	Nothing
Agfa	Agfapan 400 Professional	1968–c1989	T/P	400	B&W	Print	Professional general purpose traditional cubic grain panchromatic film. Sheet film P base.	Germany	135, 120, Sheet film	Agfapan AP 400
Agfa	Agfapan 1000 Professional	1968–c1982	T	1000	B&W	Print	Professional ultra high speed traditional cubic grain panchromatic film.	Germany	135, 120	Nothing
Agfa	Agfapan Vario-XL Professional	?–c1989	T	125	AP 70 / C-41	Print	Chromogenic black and white film that can be developed in C-41 color process. Could be exposed from ASA 125 up to ASA 1600.	Germany	135	Nothing
Agfa	Agfapan APX 25	1989–2000	T	25	B&W	Print	Professional general purpose traditional cubic grain panchromatic film, with single layer emulsion and anti-halation layer. Discontinued due to low demand.	Germany	135-36, 120	Nothing
Agfa	Agfapan APX 100	1989–2005	T/P	100	B&W	Print	General purpose traditional cubic grain panchromatic film. Wide exposure latitude and tonal range. Sheet film P base (6.5x9, 9x12, 10.2x12.7, 13x18 cm).	Germany	135, 120, Sheet film	AgfaPhoto APX 100
Agfa	Agfapan AP 400	?–c1989	T/P	400	B&W	Print	Professional general purpose traditional cubic grain panchromatic film. Sheet film P base.	Germany	135, 120, Sheet film	Agfapan APX 400
Agfa	Agfapan APX 400	c1990s–2005	T	400	B&W	Print	General purpose traditional cubic grain panchromatic film. Wide exposure latitude and tonal range.	Germany	135-36, 120	AgfaPhoto APX 400

=== Black and white reversal (slide) films ===
Make	Name	Dates	Base	ISO	Process	Type	Details	Origin	Formats	Replaced by
Agfa	Dia Direct	1970s–1980s	T	32	Dia Direct	Slide	Very fine grain, large exposure latitude.	Germany	135	Dia Direct DD 12
Agfa	Dia Direct DD 12 Professional	1980s–1995	T	12	Dia Direct	Slide	Very fine grain professional film, large exposure latitude.	Germany	135	Scala 200x
Agfa	Scala 200x	c1990s–2005	T/P	200	Scala	Slide	General purpose B&W reversal film based on the same emulsion as the APX 100 film. Wide exposure and tonal range. Requires specialist Scala process. ADOX Scala is the nearest replacement. Sheet film P base (4x5").	Germany	135-36, 120, Sheet film	Nothing

=== Color negative films ===
Make	Name	Dates	Base	ISO	Process	Type	Details	Origin	Formats	Replaced by
Agfa	Agfacolor Negativfilm T	1949–1956	T	20	Agfacolor	Print	General purpose unmasked color negative film for daylight (Tageslicht). Original speed 14/10° DIN. Introduced to the UK in 1951.	Germany	135, Karat, 127, 120, 620	Agfacolor CN17
Agfa	Agfacolor Negativfilm K	1949–1956	T	32	Agfacolor	Print	General purpose unmasked color negative film for artificial light (Kunstlicht). Original speed 16/10° DIN. Introduced to the UK in 1951.	Germany	135, 127, 120, 620, Sheet film	Agfacolor CN17
Agfa	Agfacolor CN17	1956–1971	T	40	Agfacolor Process N	Print	Universal color film, unmasked and balanced for use in daylight and artificial light, corresponding to color temperatures of about 2500K to 6500K.	Germany	135, Rapid, 127, 120, 620, Sheet film	Agfacolor CN17S
Agfa	Agfacolor CN14	1958–1966	T	20	Agfacolor Process N	Print	Universal unmasked slow-speed color negative film.	Germany	135-20	Nothing
Agfa	Agfacolor CN17M	1963–c1966	T	40	Agfacolor Process N	Print	M for Mask. Short lived general purpose masked color negative film.	Germany	Rapid, Sheet film	Agfacolor CN17S
Agfa	Agfacolor CN17S	1966–1968	T	40	Agfacolor Process N	Print	S for Special. General purpose double masked color negative film with extra fine grain.	Germany	135, 120	Agfacolor CNS
Agfa	Agfacolor CNS	1968–1975	T	80	Agfacolor Process N	Print	General purpose color film (CNS = Color Negative Special). Integral double mask as for CN17S but higher speed.	Germany	126, 135, Rapid, 127, 120, 620, Sheet film	Agfacolor CNS 2
Agfa	Agfacolor CNS 2	1971–c1982	T	80	Agfacolor Process N	Print	Introduced in 1971 as "Agfacolor Pocket Special" in 110 cartridge. Updated version of CNS with finer grain for smaller negatives of the new 110 format, higher resolution, and a 25% reduction in layer thickness. Other formats introduced in 1975 as "Agfacolor CNS 2". Renamed to "Agfacolor CNS" in all formats around 1979.	Germany	110, 126, 135, Rapid, 127, 120, 620	Agfacolor 100
Agfa	Agfacolor CNS 400	1978–c1984	T	400	AP 70 / C-41	Print	Higher speed version of CNS 2 with fine grain. First Agfa AP 70 / C-41 film.	Germany	110, 135, 120	Agfacolor XR 400
Agfa	Agfacolor 100	1981–c1984	T	100	AP 70 / C-41	Print	Consumer color film with AP 70 / C-41 process and ISO 100/21° replacing CNS 2. Orange box.	Germany	110, 126, 135, Rapid	Agfacolor XR 100
Agfa	Agfacolor XR 100	1984–1989	T	100	AP 70 / C-41	Print	Consumer general purpose color film with new structured grain technology. Orange box (Later XR 100i in white box).	Germany	110-24, 126-24, 135, Rapid, 120	Agfacolor XRG 100
Agfa	Agfacolor XR 200	1984–1989	T	200	AP 70 / C-41	Print	Consumer general purpose color film with new structured grain technology. First Agfa film to carry DX coding on 135 cartridges. First Agfa ISO 200/24° consumer color negative film. (Later XR 200i in white box).	Germany	110-24, 126-24, 135, 120	Agfacolor XRG 200
Agfa	Agfacolor XR 400	1984–1989	T	400	AP 70 / C-41	Print	Consumer general purpose color film with new structured grain technology.	Germany	110-24, 135, 120	Agfacolor XRG 400
Agfa	Agfacolor XRG 100	1989–?	T	100	AP 70 / C-41	Print	Consumer general purpose fine grain color film with high sharpness and saturation with wide exposure latitude, accurate to 1/3 stop. XRC in the US.	Germany	135	Agfacolor HDC 100
Agfa	Agfacolor XRG 200	1989–?	T	200	AP 70 / C-41	Print	Consumer general purpose fine grain color film with high sharpness and saturation with wide exposure latitude, accurate to 1/3 stop. XRC in the US.	Germany	110-24, 126-24, 135, Rapid	Agfacolor HDC 200
Agfa	Agfacolor XRG 400	1989–?	T	400	AP 70 / C-41	Print	Consumer general purpose fine grain color film with high sharpness and saturation with wide exposure latitude, accurate to 1/3 stop. XRC in the US.	Germany	135	Agfacolor HDC 400
Agfa	Agfacolor HDC 100	?–c1997	T	100	AP 70 / C-41	Print	Consumer general purpose fine grain color film.	Germany	135	Agfacolor HDC plus 100
Agfa	Agfacolor HDC 200	?–c1997	T	200	AP 70 / C-41	Print	Consumer general purpose fine grain color film.	Germany	110-24, 126-24, 135	Agfacolor HDC plus 200
Agfa	Agfacolor HDC 400	?–c1997	T	400	AP 70 / C-41	Print	Consumer general purpose fine grain color film.	Germany	135	Agfacolor HDC plus 400
Agfa	Agfacolor HDC plus 100	c1997–2001	T	100	AP 70 / C-41	Print	Improved version of Agfacolor HDC.	Germany	135	Agfa Vista 100
Agfa	Agfacolor HDC plus 200	c1997–2001	T	200	AP 70 / C-41	Print	Improved version of Agfacolor HDC. APS film sold as "Futura 200".	Germany	110-24, 126-24, 135, 240	Agfa Vista 200
Agfa	Agfacolor HDC plus 400	c1997–2001	T	400	AP 70 / C-41	Print	Improved version of Agfacolor HDC.	Germany	135	Agfa Vista 400
Agfa	Vista 100	2001–2005	T	100	AP 70 / C-41	Print	Consumer general purpose fine grain color film with Eye Vision technology from professional Optima films.	Germany	135	AgfaPhoto Vista 100
Agfa	Vista 200	2001–2005	T	200	AP 70 / C-41	Print	Consumer general purpose fine grain color film with Eye Vision technology from professional Optima films. APS film sold as "APS star 200".	Germany	110-24, 135, 240	AgfaPhoto Vista 200
Agfa	Vista 400	2001–2005	T	400	AP 70 / C-41	Print	Consumer general purpose fine grain color film with Eye Vision technology from professional Optima films. APS film sold as "APS star 400".	Germany	135, 240	AgfaPhoto Vista 400
Agfa	Vista 800	2001–2005	T	800	AP 70 / C-41	Print	Consumer general purpose fine grain color film with Eye Vision technology from professional Optima films. Agfa's first (and last) 800 speed color film.	Germany	135	Nothing
Agfa	Ultra 100	c2001–2005	T	100	AP 70 / C-41	Print	Consumer ultra saturated film with Eye Vision technology.	Germany	135-36	Nothing
Professional films:
Agfa	Agfacolor 80S Professional	c1972–c1981	T	80	Agfacolor Process N	Print	Professional version of CNS color film. Balanced for short exposures and daylight.	Germany	135, 120, Sheet film	Agfacolor N100S Professional
Agfa	Agfacolor 80L Professional	c1972–c1981	T	80	Agfacolor Process N	Print	Professional version of CNS color film. Balanced for long exposures and artificial light.	Germany	135, 120, Sheet film	Agfacolor N80L Professional
Agfa	Agfacolor N100S Professional	1981–1983	T	100	AP 70 / C-41	Print	Professional color film for short exposures <1/10 sec. Repackaged Fujicolor F-II Professional Type S. Likely sold to fill the gap during transition to C-41.	Germany	120, Sheet film	Agfacolor XRS 100
Agfa	Agfacolor N80L Professional	1981–1984	T	80	AP 70 / C-41	Print	Professional color film for artificial light/long exposures >1/10 sec. Repackaged Fujicolor F-II Professional Type L. Likely sold to fill the gap during transition to C-41.	Germany	120, Sheet film	Nothing
Agfa	Agfacolor XRS 100	1984–c1996	T	100	AP 70 / C-41	Print	Professional fine grain color film with high sharpness and saturation with wide exposure latitude, accurate to 1/6th stop. Revised in 1989 to share XRG technology and similar metallic box packaging.	Germany	135-36, 120, Sheet film	Optima II 100
Agfa	Agfacolor XRS 200	1984–c1996	T	200	AP 70 / C-41	Print	Professional general purpose fine grain color film with high sharpness and saturation with wide exposure latitude, accurate to 1/th stop. Revised in 1989 to share XRG technology and similar metallic box packaging.	Germany	135-36, 120	Optima II 200
Agfa	Agfacolor XRS 400	1984–c1996	T	400	AP 70 / C-41	Print	Professional general purpose fine grain color film with high sharpness and saturation with wide exposure latitude, accurate to 1/6th stop. Revised in 1989 to share XRG technology and similar metallic box packaging.	Germany	135-36, 120	Optima II 400
Agfa	Agfacolor XRS 1000	1984–c1996	T	1000	AP 70 / C-41	Print	Professional general purpose fine grain color film. This was not updated in 1989.	Germany	135-24, 120	Nothing
Agfa	Agfacolor Ultra 50	c1990–c2001	T	50	AP 70 / C-41	Print	Professional high saturation color negative film for landscapes and nature. Part of the Agfa "Triade".	Germany	135, 120	Nothing
Agfa	Agfacolor Optima 125	c1990–c1996	T	125	AP 70 / C-41	Print	Professional color negative film with saturation between Ultra 50 and Portrait 160. Part of the Agfa "Triade".	Germany	135, 120, Sheet film	Optima II 100
Agfa	Agfacolor Portrait 160	c1990–2005	T	160	AP 70 / C-41	Print	Professional color negative film for portrait, wedding and fashion photography. Subtle saturation. Part of the Agfa "Triade". Also sold as "Agfacolor Portrait XPS 160".	Germany	135, 120, 220	Nothing
Agfa	Agfacolor Optima II 100	c1996–2005	T	100	AP 70 / C-41	Print	Professional general purpose color negative films with EYE VISION technology. Later renamed to "Optima 100".	Germany	135, 120, Sheet film	Nothing
Agfa	Agfacolor Optima II 200	c1996–2005	T	200	AP 70 / C-41	Print	Professional range of general purpose color negative films with EYE VISION technology. Later renamed to "Optima 200". A similar un-masked variant of the emulsion was made by Agfa-Gevaert for aerial photography and converted by Maco and sold as Rollei CN 200.	Germany	135, 120	Nothing
Agfa	Agfacolor Optima II 400	c1996–2005	T	400	AP 70 / C-41	Print	Professional general purpose color negative films with EYE VISION technology. Later renamed to "Optima 400".	Germany	135, 120, 220	Nothing

=== Color reversal (slide) film ===
Make	Name	Dates	Base	ISO	Process	Type	Details	Origin	Formats	Replaced by
Agfa	Agfacolor	1931–c1936	?	?	B&W reversal	Slide	Original Agfacolor film which produced additive slides after black and white reversal development. The technology was similar to the Autochrome process.	Germany	120, Op 4, Sheet film	Agfacolor Neu
Agfa	Agfacolor Neu	1936–c1945	T	3–25	Agfacolor	Slide	Agfacolor Neu, also known as Agfacolor 111, went on public sale in November 1936 in 135 format as an ISO 3/6° film and was the first subtractive 3 layer color film incorporating dye couplers in each of the layers which could be processed at the same time by a single color developer. This arrangement formed the basis for all subsequent color slide and negative films. In comparison, Kodak Kodachrome which launched a year earlier required the processing of each color layer separately. Agfacolor Neu was initially made available on a trial basis from April 1936 with use in the August 1936 Berlin Olympics. By 1941 speed was increased to ISO 10/11° and later to ISO 25/15°.	Germany	135-36, Karat	Agfacolor Umkehrfilm T
Agfa	Agfacolor Neu für Kunstlichtaufnahme	1936–c1945	T	3–25	Agfacolor	Slide	Agfacolor Neu slide film for artificial light.	Germany	135-36, Karat	Agfacolor Umkehrfilm K
Agfa	Agfacolor Umkehrfilm T	1950s	T	25	Agfacolor	Slide	General purpose color reversal film for daylight (Tageslicht). Original speed 15/10° DIN.	Germany	135, 127, 120	Agfacolor CT18
Agfa	Agfacolor Umkehrfilm K	1950s	T	25	Agfacolor	Slide	General purpose color reversal film for artificial light (Kunstlicht). Original speed 15/10° DIN.	Germany	135, 127, 120	Agfacolor CK
Agfa	Agfacolor/Agfachrome CT18	1958–1984	T	50	AP 41	Slide	General purpose color reversal film for daylight. Renamed to Agfachrome in 1978. Warm pleasing colors, but not very stable in long-term storage. 110 and 126 formats had speed of ISO 64/19°. 110 film was sold as "Agfachrome Pocket Special" until c1982.	Germany	110, 126, 135, Rapid, 127, 120, 620	Agfachrome CT 64
Agfa	Agfacolor CK	c1963–c1972	T	80	AP 41	Slide	General purpose color reversal film for artificial light. Similar properties as Agfacolor CT18.	Germany	135-36, 120	Nothing
Agfa	Agfacolor/Agfachrome CT21	1974–1984	T	100	AP 41	Slide	General purpose color reversal film, similar to CT18 but with speed of ISO 100/21°. Renamed to Agfachrome in 1978.	Germany	135	Agfachrome CT 100
Agfa	Agfachrome 64	1974–1983	T	64	AP 41	Slide	Consumer color reversal film for the North American market.	Germany	135, 126	?
Agfa	Agfachrome 100	1980s	T	100	AP 41	Slide	Consumer color reversal film.	Germany	135	Agfachrome CT 100
Agfa	Agfachrome 200	1980s	T	200	AP 44 / E-6	Slide	Consumer color reversal film.	Germany	135	Agfachrome CT 200
Agfa	Agfachrome CT 64	c1982–?	T	64	AP 44 / E-6	Slide	General purpose consumer color reversal film.	Germany	135	?
Agfa	Agfachrome CT 200	1982–1992	T	200	AP 44 / E-6	Slide	General purpose consumer color reversal film. First Agfa AP 44 / E-6 process film.	Germany	135	?
Agfa	Agfachrome CT 100	1984–1992	T	100	AP 44 / E-6	Slide	General purpose consumer color reversal film.	Germany	135	Agfachrome CT 100i
Agfa	Agfachrome CT 100i	1992–1995	T	100	AP 44 / E-6	Slide	Improved version of Agfachrome CT 100. Launched at Photokina.	Germany	135	Agfachrome CT 100x
Agfa	Agfachrome CT 100x	1995–1999	T	100	AP 44 / E-6	Slide	Consumer general purpose color slide film. Launched at Photo Marking Association in 1995 with improvements in color intensity, accuracy, and edge definition along with enhanced pushability.	Germany	135	Agfa CTprecisa 100
Agfa	CTprecisa 100	1999–2005	T	100	AP 44 / E-6	Slide	Consumer general purpose color slide film. The film boasted stronger colors and softer tones. After 2005 replaced by AgfaPhoto CTprecisa made by Ferrania and subsequently Fujifilm.	Germany	135-36	AgfaPhoto CTprecisa 100
Agfa	CTprecisa 200	1999–2005	T	200	AP 44 / E-6	Slide	Consumer general purpose color slide film.	Germany	135-36	Nothing
Professional films:
Agfa	Agfachrome 50S Professional	1968–1986	T	50	AP 41	Slide	Professional color reversal film. For short exposures <1 sec. Color balanced for 5500K. Last batches expired around 1987/88.	Germany	135, 120, Sheet film	?
Agfa	Agfachrome 50L Professional	1968–1986	T	50	AP 41	Slide	Professional color reversal film. For long exposures over 1 sec. Color balanced for 3100K. Last batches expired around 1987/88.	Germany	135, 120, Sheet film	Nothing
Agfa	Agfachrome 64 Professional	?	T	64	AP 41	Slide	Professional color reversal film balanced for daylight.	Germany	135, 120	Agfachrome 50 RS
Agfa	Agfachrome 100 Professional	?	T	100	AP 41	Slide	Professional color reversal film balanced for daylight.	Germany	135, 120	Agfachrome 100 RS
Agfa	Agfachrome 200 Professional	?	T	200	AP 44 / E-6	Slide	Professional color reversal film balanced for daylight. First professional AP 44 / E-6 film.	Germany	135	Agfachrome 200 RS
Agfa	Agfachrome R100S Professional	1981–1984	T	100	AP 44 / E-6	Slide	Professional color reversal film balanced for daylight. Repackaged Fujichrome 100 Professional Type D. Likely sold to fill the gap during transition to E-6.	Germany	135, 120, Sheet film	Agfachrome 100 RS
Agfa	Agfachrome 50 RS	1984–1995	T	50	AP 44 / E-6	Slide	Professional general purpose color slide film. Agfa process 44 compatible with Kodak E-6, replacing Agfa process 41 films. Improved emulsion "Agfachrome RS 50 Plus" from 1992.	Germany	135, 120	Agfachrome RSX 50
Agfa	Agfachrome 100 RS	1984–1995	T	100	AP 44 / E-6	Slide	Professional general purpose color slide film. Improved emulsion "Agfachrome RS 100 Plus" from 1992.	Germany	135, 120	Agfachrome RSX 100
Agfa	Agfachrome 200 RS	1984–1995	T	200	AP 44 / E-6	Slide	Professional general purpose color slide film. Improved emulsion "Agfachrome RS 200 Plus" from 1992.	Germany	135, 120	Agfachrome RSX 200
Agfa	Agfachrome 1000 RS	1984–1995	T	1000	AP 44 / E-6	Slide	Professional very high speed color slide film.	Germany	135	Nothing
Agfa	Agfachrome RSX 50	1995–1998	T	50	AP 44 / E-6	Slide	Professional general purpose color slide film.	Germany	135, 120, Sheet film	Agfachrome RSX II 50
Agfa	Agfachrome RSX 100	1995–1998	T	100	AP 44 / E-6	Slide	Professional general purpose color slide film.	Germany	135, 120, Sheet film	Agfachrome RSX II 100
Agfa	Agfachrome RSX 200	1995–1998	T	200	AP 44 / E-6	Slide	Professional general purpose color slide film.	Germany	135, 120	Agfachrome RSX II 200
Agfa	Agfachrome RSX II 50	1999–2005	T	50	AP 44 / E-6	Slide	Professional general purpose color slide film.	Germany	135-36, 120	Nothing
Agfa	Agfachrome RSX II 100	1999–2005	T	100	AP 44 / E-6	Slide	Professional general purpose color slide film. The "Pro" RSX II film "made with extremely narrow production tolerances to ensure maximum consistency as required by professionals" does not require refrigeration except in hot/humid conditions. Consumer equivalent CTprecisa.	Germany	135-36, 120, Sheet film	Nothing
Agfa	Agfachrome RSX II 200	1999–2005	T	200	AP 44 / E-6	Slide	Professional general purpose color slide film. Slightly subdued perceived by many users as natural and producing flattering skin tones. After the demise of AgfaPhoto Agfa-Gevaert continued producing the emulsion for aerial photography on a polyester base as Aviphot Chrome 200 PE1. Maco converted this as Rollei CR 200. Also sold as Lomography X-Pro 200.	Germany	135-36, 120	Nothing

== AGFA PHOTO ==
The AGFA consumer film division with its plant in Leverkusen, Germany was spun off by Agfa-Gevaert into a new company AGFA PHOTO in 2004. At buy out the firm was split into a holding company Agfa-Photo Holding GMBH (licenses) and manufacturing company Agfa-Photo GMBH (leverkusen). The manufacturing company went bankrupt in 7 months resulting in the closure of the Leverkusen plant in 2005. The holding company was unaffected and retains a trademark license from Agfa-Gevaert for the use of the AgfaPhoto brand and 'red dot' logo on products having a photographic application. Since 2005 these rights for consumer film products have been sub-licensed to Lupus Imaging & Media. After 2005 the color films were initially made by Ferrania while black and white films continued to be AGFA material converted by Ferrania from cold stored master rolls of AGFA APX. Ferrania itself closed in 2009 and so Lupus procured replacement Agfa Photo branded films from Fujifilm (color) and Harman/Ilford (black and white). The contract with Fujifilm ended in early 2018 ending the sale of color film under the AgfaPhoto brand.

=== Black and white film ===
Make	Name	Dates	Base	ISO	Process	Type	Details	Origin	Formats	Replaced by
AGFA PHOTO	APX 100	2005–2012	T	100	B&W	Print	General purpose traditional cubic grain panchromatic film with wide exposure and tonal range. Film was converted by Ferrania, Italy from AGFA Leverkusen APX master rolls that had been cold stored until this material was exhausted. ADOX Silvermax is a near equivalent to the original AGFA APX 100.	Germany	135, 120	New Agfa Photo APX 100, ADOX Silvermax
AGFA PHOTO	APX 400	2005–2012	T	400	B&W	Print	General purpose traditional cubic grain panchromatic film with wide exposure and tonal range. Film was converted by Ferrania, Italy from AGFA Leverkusen APX master rolls that had been cold stored until this material was exhausted. ADOX test-produced a slightly improved version of AGFA APX 400 as ADOX Pan 400 during 2010. Due to Fotokemika stopping general production in 2012 priority was given to ADOX CHS II instead.	Germany	135, 120	New Agfa Photo APX 400

=== Color negative film ===
Make	Name	Dates	Base	ISO	Process	Type	Details	Origin	Formats	Replaced by
AGFA PHOTO	Vista 100	2005–2009	T	100	C-41	Print	Consumer color film produced by Ferrania post Leverkusens closure, based on Solaris FG 100.	Italy	135	Vista plus 100
AGFA PHOTO	Vista 200	2005–2009	T	200	C-41	Print	Consumer color film produced by Ferrania post Leverkusens closure, based on Solaris FG 200.	Italy	135	Vista plus 200
AGFA PHOTO	Vista 400	2005–2009	T	400	C-41	Print	Consumer color film, produced by Ferrania post Leverkusens closure based on Solaris FG 400.	Italy	135	Vista plus 400
AGFA PHOTO	Vista 800	2005–2009	T	800	C-41	Print	Consumer color film, produced by Ferrania post Leverkusens closure based on Solaris FG 800. Production was not continued when supply switched to Fuji so there is no 'plus' variant	Italy	135	Nothing
AGFA PHOTO	Vista plus 100	2009-2018	T	100	C-41	Print	General purpose budget color film (Re-branded Fujicolor Superia 100). Sold in 24/36 exp. rolls and 3 packs. Production ended 2018.	Japan	135	Nothing
AGFA PHOTO	Vista plus 200	2009-2018	T	200	C-41	Print	General purpose budget color film (Re-branded Fujicolor Superia 200). Sold in 24/36 exp. rolls and 3 packs. Production ended 2018, last stock expiry dated 4.2020.	Japan	135	Nothing
AGFA PHOTO	Vista plus 400	2009-2018	T	400	C-41	Print	General purpose budget color film (assumed to be Fujicolor Superia 400). Sold in 24/36 exp. rolls and 3 packs. Production ended 2018.	Japan	135	Nothing

=== Color reversal (slide) films ===
Make	Name	Dates	Base	ISO	Process	Type	Details	Origin	Formats	Replaced by
AGFA PHOTO	CTprecisa 100	2005–2009	T	100	E-6	Slide	General purpose slide film produced by Ferrania, initially using Agfa chemicals. Ferrania version identified by picture of yellow boats on outer box.	Italy	135-36	CTprecisa 100 (2009)
AGFA PHOTO	CTprecisa 100 (new)	2009–2018	T	100	E-6	Slide	General purpose slide film produced by Fujifilm. Packaging box shows colored beach huts. Considered to be based on either Fujichrome Provia 100F (possibly cut from edges of master rolls) which was still in production or discontinued Fujichrome Sensia emulsion. Production ended early 2018 and by mid 2018 was sold out.	Japan	135-36	Nothing

== Azomureș ==
Azomureș or AZO, produced by Târgu-Mureș Nitrogenous Fertilizer Plant, was the photographic brand of Romania since the 1981. The photosensitive materials plant in Târgu Mureș, a city in northern Romania, covering an area of about 7 hectares. The plant produced black and white and color photographic paper and films for general photography, industrial and medical use and black and white and color cinematographic films. Film production ended in 2003.

The plant was designed by Japan's Fujitsu to withstand a 9.4 degree earthquake on the Richter scale, consequently due to high cost of demolition the company decided to use the buildings to host cultural events and the photosensitive materials plant was re-opened for this purpose in May 2016.

=== Black and white film ===
Make	Name	Dates	Base	ISO	Process	Type	Details	Origin	Formats	Replaced by
AZO	Azopan PS-18	1981–?	T	50	B&W	Print	Panchromatic film. Green box.	Romania	135, 120	Nothing
AZO	Azopan PS-21	1981–?	T	100	B&W	Print	Panchromatic film. Orange box.	Romania	135, 120, sheet film	Nothing
AZO	Azopan PS-24	1980s–?	T	200	B&W	Print	Fast panchromatic film. Blue box.	Romania	135, 120	Nothing
AZO	Azopan PS-27	1980s–?	T	400	B&W	Print	High speed panchromatic film. Yellow box.	Romania	135, 120	Nothing

Discontinued Azomureș Azopan films
Azopan logo

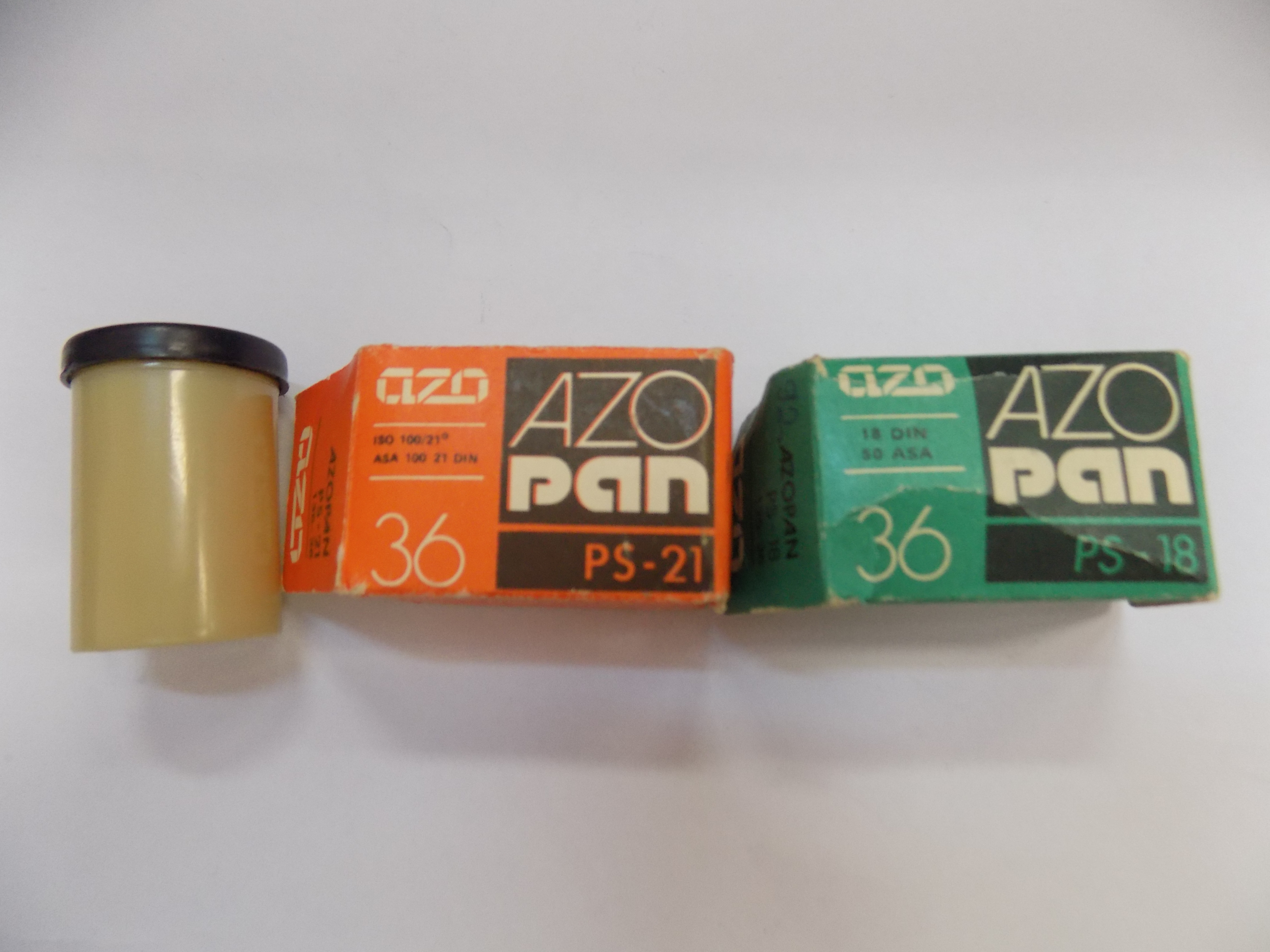
Packaging of black and white panchromatic negative films (cardboard and plastic boxes), Azopan PS-18 and PS-21 with 36 frames.

=== Color negative film ===
Make	Name	Dates	Base	ISO	Process	Type	Details	Origin	Formats	Replaced by
AZO	Azocolor-100	1980s	T	100	ACP-441 / C-41	Print	General purpose film for color prints.	Romania	135, 120	Azocolor ACN-100
AZO	Azocolor ACN-100	1980s–1990s	T	100	ACP-441 / C-41	Print	General purpose film for color prints.	Romania	135, 120	Nothing

== Dan-Di film ==
Was a film manufactured in Belgium.

=== Dan-Di Orthochromatic safety film ===
- Type: Safety Film – Orthochromatic
- Available formats: 116 N-16(known)
- Speed: Rating of High Speed (?) on box EM-N°
- Granularity:
- Latitude:
- Resolving Power:
- History:
- Primary Usage:

== dekopan ==
VEB Fotochemische Werke Berlin produced films under the brand "dekopan". DEKO stands for DEutsche KOdak. Originally a Kodak subsidiary in Germany. After the founding of German Democratic Republic, the Kodak AG was nationalised and used Kodak branding until 1956 when it was renamed to VEB Fotochemische Werke Berlin. The factory became a part of VEB Fotochemisches Kombinat Wolfen in 1970 and ceased production of photographic films.

Make	Name	Dates	Base	ISO	Process	Type	Details	Origin	Formats	Replaced by
dekopan	FF 14	c1956–c1965	T	20	B&W	Print	Ultra fine-grain ortho-panchromatic thin layer film.	GDR	135-36, 635-36, 935-36, 127, 120, 116	dekopan FF 16
dekopan	F 17	c1956–c1965	T	40	B&W	Print	Very fine-grain ortho-panchromatic film.	GDR	135-36, 635-36, 935-36, 127, 120, 116, sheet film	dekopan F 19
dekopan	S 21	c1956–c1965	T	100	B&W	Print	Fine-grain ortho-panchromatic film.	GDR	135-36, 635-36, 935-36, 127, 120, 116	dekopan S 22
dekopan	U 24	c1956–c1965	T	200	B&W	Print	High speed ortho-panchromatic film.	GDR	135-36, 635-36, 935-36, 127, 120, 116	dekopan U 25
dekopan	Porträt	c1956–?	T	80	B&W	Print	Orthochromatic film for portraiture.	GDR	sheet film	?
dekopan	FF 16	c1965–1970	T	32	B&W	Print	Ultra fine-grain ortho-panchromatic film.	GDR	135-36, 120	Nothing
dekopan	F 19	c1965–1970	T	64	B&W	Print	Very fine-grain ortho-panchromatic film.	GDR	135-36, 120	Nothing
dekopan	S 22	c1965–1970	T	125	B&W	Print	Fine-grain black and white film.	GDR	135-36, 120	Nothing
dekopan	U 25	c1965–1970	T	250	B&W	Print	High speed black and white film.	GDR	135-36, 120	Nothing

== efke ==
efke was a brand of (mainly, but not limited to) black and white films and photographic papers produced by Fotokemika Zagreb d.d. based in Samobor (near Zagreb), Croatia (former Yugoslavia). Fotokemika acquired the rights to the ADOX film recipes and the production machinery from owners Dupont in the 1970s. As Dupont retained the ADOX brand name, Fotokemika sold the films under the efke brand and continued to manufacture them according to the original 1950s film formulas. The films were also sold by Fotoimpex (Berlin, Germany) under the original ADOX brand name after they acquired the rights to this in 2003. After Fotokemika's closure in 2012, ADOX (Fotoimpex) subsequently revived the KB 100 film as ADOX CHS 100 II.

Furthermore Fotokemika had a short lived line of color films and color reversal films called "efkecolor" and "efkechrome" in the 1980s. Both lines were discontinued in the 1990s for unknown reasons, presumably due to supply shortages and infrastructural damage as a result of the Yugoslav Wars.

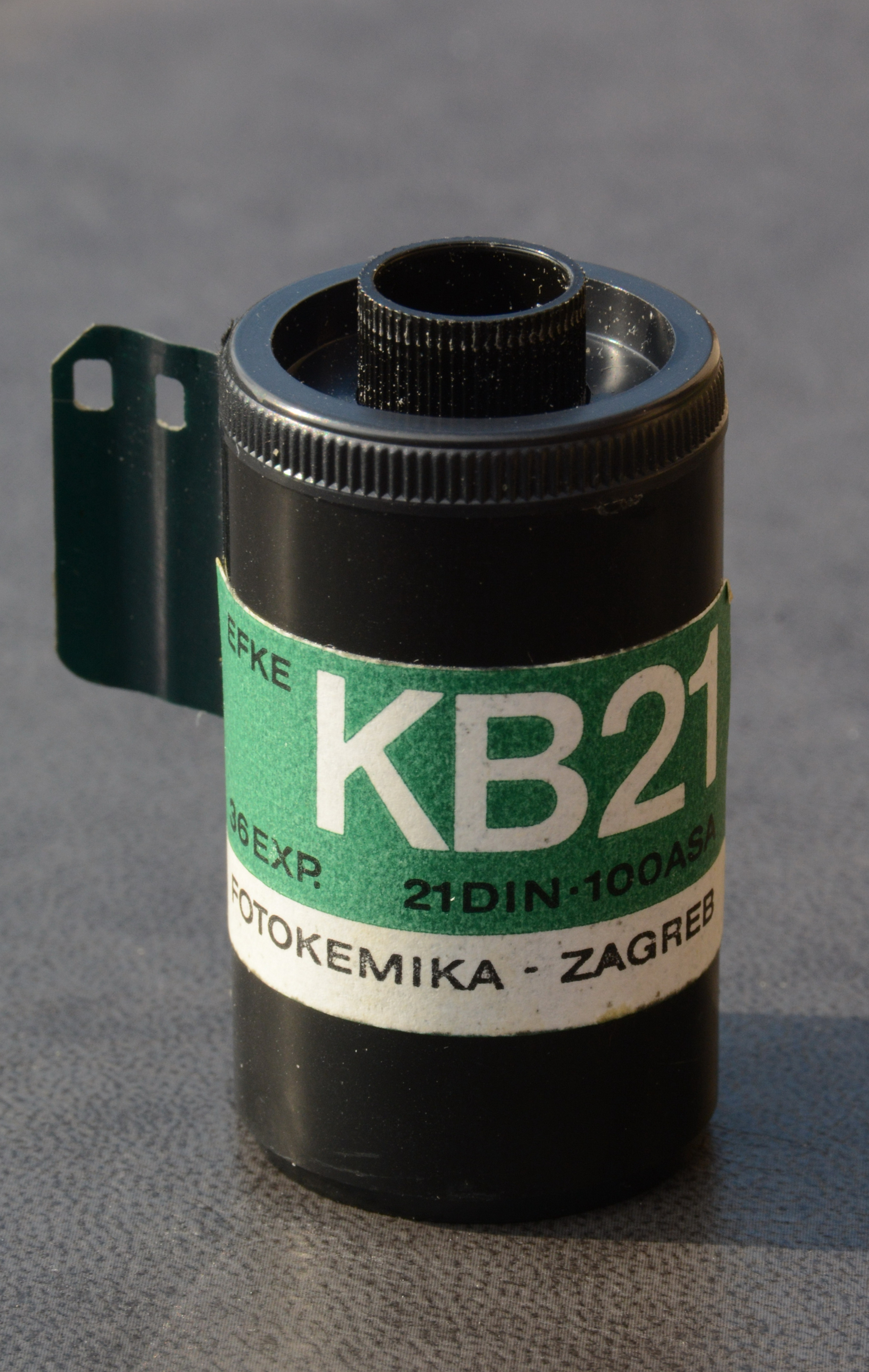
efke B&W film cartridge

Make	Name	Dates	Base	ISO	Process	Type	Details	Origin	Formats	Replaced by
efke	efke 17	?–1974	T	40	B&W	Print	Ortho-panchromatic film. Pre-ADOX formula.	Yugoslavia	135, 127, 120, sheet film	KB17 / R17
efke	efke 20	?–1974	T	80	B&W	Print	Ortho-panchromatic film. Pre-ADOX formula.	Yugoslavia	135, 127, 120, sheet film	KB21 / R21 / PL21M
efke	efke 25	?–1974	T	250	B&W	Print	Panchromatic film. Pre-ADOX formula.	Yugoslavia	135, 127, 120, sheet film	Nothing
EFKE	KB14 / R14	1974–c1991	T	20	B&W	Print	Ortho-panchromatic classic 1950s style single layer emulsion. Last stock expired in 1993.	Yugoslavia	135-36, 120	KB 25 / R 25
EFKE	KB17 / R17	1974–c1991	T	40	B&W	Print	Ortho-panchromatic classic 1950s style emulsion. Last stock expired in 1993.	Yugoslavia	135-36, 120	KB 50 / R 50
EFKE	KB21 / R21 / PL21M	1974–c1991	T	100	B&W	Print	Panchromatic classic 1950s style emulsion. Sheet film PL21M with retouchable back.	Yugoslavia	135-36, 127, 120, 620, sheet film	KB 100 / R 100 / PL 100 M
EFKE	KB27	1980s–c1991	T	400	B&W	Print	High speed panchromatic film.	Yugoslavia	135-36	KB 400
efke	KB 25 / R 25 / PL 25 M	1990s–2012	T	25	B&W	Print	Ortho-panchromatic classic 1950s style single layer emulsion. 135 (KB 25), 120 (R 25) and sheet size (PL 25 M 4×5, 5×7 and 8×10). Sheet film has retouchable back.	Croatia	135, 120, sheet film	Nothing
efke	KB 50 / R 50 / PL 50 M	1990s–2012	T	50	B&W	Print	Ortho-panchromatic classic 1950s style emulsion. 135 (KB 50), 120 (R 50) and sheet size (PL 50 M 4×5, 5×7 and 8×10).	Croatia	135, 120, sheet film.	Nothing
efke	KB 100 / R 100 / PL 100 M	1990s–2012	T	100	B&W	Print	Ortho-panchromatic classic 1950s style emulsion. 135 (KB 100), 120 (R 100), 127 (R 100-127) and sheet size (PL 100 M 4×5, 5×7 and 8×10). Sheet film has retouchable back. The same film was subsequently produced for ADOX by Inoviscoat, Germany as ADOX CHS 100 II.	Croatia	135, 127, 120, sheet film	ADOX CHS 100 II
efke	KB 400	?–2012	T	400	B&W	Print	High speed panchromatic film. Sold only in 35mm format. Rebranded Ilford HP5 Plus.	Croatia	135	Nothing
efke	IR 820	1974–2012	T	n/a	B&W	Print	Infrared film with sensitivity up to 820nm. Sheet size (PL IR 820 4×5, 5×7 and 8×10).	Croatia	135, 127, 120, sheet film	Nothing

=== Color negative film ===
Make	Name	Dates	Base	ISO	Process	Type	Details	Origin	Formats	Replaced by
EFKE	Color NM19	1968–1972 1972–1977	T	64	Agfacolor, C-22	Print	Masked color negative film for daylight. Originally rebranded Ferrania NM64, from 1972 3M Color Print (C-22).	Italy, Yugoslavia	135, 120	Color NM21
EFKE	Color NM20	1972–1977	T	80	C-41	Print	Masked color negative film for daylight. Rebranded 3M Color Print (C-41).	Italy, Yugoslavia	135, 120	Color NM21
EFKE	Color NM21	1979–c1986	T	100	C-41	Print	Masked color negative film for daylight. Rebranded 3M Color Print.	Italy, Yugoslavia	135, 120	efkecolor 100
efke	efkecolor 100, efkecolor 400	1986–1999	?	100, 400	C-41	Print	Presumed to be rebranded Scotch Color Print 100 and 400 manufactured by 3M.	Italy, Yugoslavia	135	Nothing
efke	efkecolor spektar	c1992–?	?	100, 200, 400	C-41	Print	Presumed to be rebranded Konica Color Super SR.	Japan, Croatia	135	Nothing
efke	Super HG 100	c1996–?	?	100	C-41	Print	Presumed to be rebranded Fujicolor Super G Plus.	Japan, Croatia	135	Nothing

=== Color reversal film ===
Make	Name	Dates	Base	ISO	Process	Type	Details	Origin	Formats	Replaced by
EFKE	Color RD15	1964–1968	T	25	Agfacolor	Slide	Color reversal film for daylight. Rebranded Ferrania stock.	Italy, Yugoslavia	135	Color RD17
EFKE	Color RD17	1968–1976	T	40	Agfacolor	Slide	Color reversal film for daylight. Rebranded 3M Ferrania stock.	Italy, Yugoslavia	135	Color RD20
EFKE	Color RD20	1976–1979	T	80	E-4	Slide	Color reversal film for daylight. Rebranded 3M Color Slide.	Italy, Yugoslavia	135	Color RD21
EFKE	Color RD21	1979–1984	T	100	E-6	Slide	Color reversal film for daylight. Rebranded 3M Color Slide.	Italy, Yugoslavia	135, 120	efkechrome 100
efke	efkechrome 100	1984–1999	T	100	E-6	Slide	Presumed to be rebranded Konica Chrome 100 (Sakurachrome R-100).	Japan, Croatia	135	Nothing

== Eisenberger ==
Eisenberger Trockenplattenfabrik Otto Kirschten was a German manufacturer of dry plates. Eisenberger Trockenplattenfabrik

== ERA ==
ERA's factory was originally founded in 1950 in Shantou, China. It was named Shantou ERA Limited Corporation (ERA) in 1999. Its main products were black and white film, resin coated papers and x-ray film. Kodak China acquired an 80% share of their assets in 1998 and reputedly invested in a color film line. Production of film emulsion seem to have ended, c2008.

Make	Name	Dates	Base	ISO	Process	Type	Details	Origin	Formats	Replaced by
ERA	100	1999–c2008	T	100	B&W	Print	Traditional B&W film with anti-halation layer	China	135, Sheet film	Nothing

== Ferrania ==
Ferrania was an Italian filmmaker based in Ferrania (Liguria), Italy founded in 1923 as a maker of photographic film, papers, and photographic equipment, including cameras. The company was purchased in 1964 by the 3M corporation (US) to become Ferrania 3M and made photographic film sold under the 'Scotch' brand. The films and data storage division was spun off from 3M in 1996 becoming Imation. In 1999, Ferrania was acquired by Schroder Ventures and subsequently sold on to Gruppo Messina (Ignazio Messina & Co. S.p.A.) in 2000, as Ferrania Imaging Technology with film being sold again under the Ferrania brand. However photographic film manufacture ended in 2009. Whilst originally a producer of B&W cine/still films such as P30, as Ferrania 3M it became a significant producer of 'white label' consumer color films for both retailers and traditional B&W film producers needing a color film to repackage under their own brand. Examples include; Fortecolor film (also supplied by Konica), the Boots UK pharmacy chain color negative products from ca. 1973 until 2003 and AgfaPhoto color negative and slide films from 2005 until plant closure in 2009 (for Lupus Imaging). Ferrania Technology continues to produce chemicals for medical use and solar panels on part of the original factory complex whilst the film plant was demolished. In 2013 a new company was founded as FILM Ferrania to build a film manufacturing company using the former Ferrania Research laboratory building, its coating machine and other equipment salvaged from the original Ferrania production plant prior to its demolition.

=== Black and white film ===
Make	Name	Dates	Base	ISO	Process	Type	Details	Origin	Formats	Replaced by
Ferrania	U 2	1950s	T	50	B&W	Print	Black and white film. Original speed 18/10° DIN	Italy	135	?
Ferrania	Pancro P 3	1950s	T	50	B&W	Print	Black and white film. Original speed 28° Sch.	Italy	135, 120	Ferrania P30
Ferrania	Pancro S 2	1950s	T	125	B&W	Print	Black and white film. Original speed 32° Sch.	Italy	135, 120	Ferrania P33
Ferrania	Pancro S 4	1950s	T	320	B&W	Print	High speed black and white film.	Italy	135, 120	Ferrania P36
Ferrania	P24	1960s–1970s	T	20	B&W	Print	Very fine grain black and white film.	Italy	135	Nothing
Ferrania / 3M	P30	1960–1970s	T	80	B&W	Print	Ortho-panchromatic film. Introduced in 1960 in three versions: Cinema, Leica and Portrait. After 1964 sold as "3M Ferrania P30".	Italy	135, 127, 120, 620	Nothing
Ferrania / 3M	P33	1960s–1970s	T	160	B&W	Print	Fast black and white film. After 1964 sold as "3M Ferrania P33".	Italy	135, 127, 120, 116	Nothing
Ferrania	P36	1960s–1970s	T	320	B&W	Print	High speed black and white film.	Italy	120	Nothing

=== Color negative film ===
Make	Name	Dates	Base	ISO	Process	Type	Details	Origin	Formats	Replaced by
Ferrania / 3M	Ferraniacolor N27	?–c1967	T	40	Agfacolor	Print	Unmasked color negative film with universal color balance based on Agfacolor.	Italy	135, 120	Ferraniacolor NM64
3M	Ferrania NM64	c1967–?	T	64	Agfacolor	Print	Masked color negative film with higher speed based on Agfacolor.	Italy	135, 120	3M Color Print
3M	Color Print	1970s	T	64	C-22	Print	Masked color negative film for daylight.	Italy	?	3M Color Print (C-41)
3M	Color Print	1970s–c1983	T	80-100	CNP-4 / C-41	Print	Updated version of Color Print with slightly increased speed and processing in C-41 chemistry. Speed later increased to ASA 100.	Italy	110, 126, 135, 120	Color Print II 100
3M	Color Print 400	?	T	400	CNP-4 / C-41	Print	High speed color negative film for daylight.	Italy	135	Color Print HR 400
3M	Color Print II 100	c1983–?	T	100	CNP-4 / C-41	Print	Color negative film for daylight.	Italy	110, 126, 135, 120	Color Print HR100
3M	Color Print II 120RP	c1983–c1986	T	100	CNP-4 / C-41	Print	Professional version of ColorPrint II.	Italy	120	Nothing
3M	Color Disc Film	c1983–?	T	200	CNP-4 / C-41	Print	Color negative film for daylight for Disc cameras.	Italy	Disc	Color Print HR Disc
3M	Color Print HR100	?–c1986	T	100	CNP-4 / C-41	Print	Color negative film for daylight.	Italy	110, 126, 135, 120	Scotch Color Print HR 100
3M	Color Print HR200	?–c1986	T	200	CNP-4 / C-41	Print	Color negative film for daylight.	Italy	135	Scotch Color Print HR 200
3M	Color Print HR400	?–c1986	T	400	CNP-4 / C-41	Print	Color negative film for daylight.	Italy	135	Scotch Color Print HR 400
3M	Color Print HR Disc	?–c1986	T	200	CNP-4 / C-41	Print	Color Print HR200 in Disc format.	Italy	Disc	Scotch Color Print HR 200
3M	Scotch Color Print HR 100	c1987–?	T	100	C-41	Print	Color negative film for daylight.	Italy	126, 135	Scotch Color EXL Plus 100
3M	Scotch Color Print HR 200	c1987–?	T	200	C-41	Print	Color negative film for daylight.	Italy	135, Disc	Scotch Color EXL Plus 200
3M	Scotch Color Print HR 400	c1987–?	T	400	C-41	Print	Color negative film for daylight.	Italy	135	Scotch Color EXL Plus 400
3M / Imation	Scotch Color EXL Plus 100	1990s	T	100	C-41	Print	Color negative film for daylight. After 1996 rebranded to Imation.	Italy	135	Imation Color HP 100
3M / Imation	Scotch Color EXL Plus 200	1990s	T	200	C-41	Print	Color negative film for daylight. After 1996 rebranded to Imation.	Italy	135	Imation Color HP 200
3M / Imation	Scotch Color EXL Plus 400	1990s	T	400	C-41	Print	Color negative film for daylight. After 1996 rebranded to Imation.	Italy	135	Imation Color FG 400
Imation	Color HP 100	1990s	T	100	C-41	Print	Color negative film for daylight.	Italy	135	Solaris FG 100
Imation	Color HP 200	1990s	T	200	C-41	Print	Color negative film for daylight.	Italy	135	Solaris FG 200
Imation	Color FG 400	1990s	T	400	C-41	Print	Color negative film for daylight.	Italy	135	Solaris FG 400
Ferrania	Solaris FG 100	2000–2003	T	100	C-41	Print	From early 2000 by Ferrania Imaging Technologies. Color negative film for daylight. Also sold as white label film.	Italy	135	Solaris FG 100 Plus
Ferrania	Solaris FG 200	2000–2003	T	200	C-41	Print	Color negative film for daylight. Also sold as white label film.	Italy	110, 126, 135, 240	Solaris FG 200 Plus
Ferrania	Solaris FG 400	2000–2003	T	400	C-41	Print	Color negative film for daylight. Also sold as white label film.	Italy	135, 240	Solaris FG 400 Plus
Ferrania	Solaris FG 800	2000–2003	T	800	C-41	Print	Color negative film for daylight. Also sold as white label film.	Italy	135	Solaris FG 800 Plus
Ferrania	Solaris FG 100 Plus	2003–2009	T	100	C-41	Print	Improved version of Solaris FG.	Italy	135	Nothing
Ferrania	Solaris FG 200 Plus	2003–2009	T	200	C-41	Print	Improved version of Solaris FG. 110 and 126 formats were discontinued in 2007.	Italy	110, 126, 135, 240	Nothing
Ferrania	Solaris FG 400 Plus	2003–2009	T	400	C-41	Print	Improved version of Solaris FG.	Italy	135	Nothing
Ferrania	Solaris FG 800 Plus	2003–2009	T	800	C-41	Print	Improved version of Solaris FG.	Italy	135	Nothing

=== Color reversal film ===
Make	Name	Dates	Base	ISO	Process	Type	Details	Origin	Formats	Replaced by
Ferrania	Ferraniacolor	1947–c1962	T	25	Agfacolor	Slide	Color reversal film for daylight based on Agfacolor.	Italy	135, 120, glass plates	Ferraniacolor Dia 28
Ferrania / 3M	Ferraniacolor Dia 28	c1962–c1971	T	50	Agfacolor	Slide	Improved color reversal film with higher speed. After 1964 sold as "3M Ferrania DIA 28".	Italy	135, 120	Ferrania CR50
3M	Ferrania CR50	c1967–c1975	T	50	Agfacolor	Slide	Color reversal film for daylight.	Italy	135, 120	3M Color Slide
3M	Ferrania CR50A	c1967–c1975	T	50	Agfacolor	Slide	Color reversal film for artificial light.	Italy	135, 120	Nothing
3M	Dynachrome 25	1960s–1970s	T	25	K-11	Slide	Color reversal film for daylight, knock-off Kodachrome based on expired Kodak Patents.	Italy	135	Nothing
3M	Dynachrome 64	1960s–1970s	T	64	K-11	Slide	Color reversal film for daylight with higher speed, knock-off Kodachrome based on expired Kodak Patents.	Italy	126, 135, 127	Nothing
3M	Color Slide	1970s	T	80	E-4	Slide	Color reversal film for daylight.	Italy	?	Color Slide 100
3M	Color Slide 100	1970s–1980s	T	100	E-6	Slide	Improved version of Color Slide with slightly increased speed and E-6 processing. 110 and 126 formats discontinued c1983.	Italy	110, 126, 135	Scotch Chrome 100
3M	Color Slide 400	1970s–1980s	T	400	E-6	Slide	High speed color reversal film for daylight. 110 and 126 formats discontinued c1983.	Italy	110, 126, 135	Scotch Chrome 400
3M	Color Slide 1000	1970s–1980s	T	1000	E-6	Slide	Ultra high speed color reversal film for daylight	Italy	135	Scotch Chrome 1000
3M	Color Slide 640-T	1982–?	T	640	E-6	Slide	High speed color reversal film for artificial light	Italy	135	Scotch Chrome 640-T
3M	Color Slide 64	c1983–c1986	T	64	E-6	Slide	Fine grain color reversal film for artificial light.	Italy	110, 126	Nothing
3M	Scotch Chrome 100	1980s–1990s	T	100	E-6	Slide	Color reversal film for daylight, also sold as "Scotch Color Slide".	Italy	135	Imation Chrome 100
3M	Scotch Chrome 400	1980s–1990s	T	400	E-6	Slide	High speed color reversal film for daylight, also sold as "Scotch Color Slide".	Italy	135	Imation Chrome 400
3M	Scotch Chrome 1000	1980s–1990s	T	1000	E-6	Slide	Ultra high speed color reversal film for daylight, also sold as "Scotch Color Slide".	Italy	135	Nothing
3M	Scotch Chrome 640-T	1980s–1990s	T	640	E-6	Slide	High speed color reversal film for artificial light.	Italy	135	Imation Chrome 640T
3M	Scotch Chrome 800/3200P	1980s–1990s	T	800	E-6	Slide	High speed professional color reversal film suitable for push-processing.	Italy	135	Nothing
Imation	Chrome 100	c1996–?	T	100	E-6	Slide	Color reversal film for daylight.	Italy	135	Ferrania Solaris Chrome 100
Imation	Chrome 400	c1996–?	T	400	E-6	Slide	High speed color reversal film for daylight.	Italy	135	Nothing
Imation	Chrome 640T	c1996–?	T	640	E-6	Slide	High speed color reversal film for artificial light.	Italy	135	Nothing
Ferrania	Solaris Chrome 100	2000–2005	T	100	E-6	Slide	Color reversal film for daylight.	Italy	135	Nothing

== FILM Ferrania ==
FILM Ferrania s.r.l. is a photographic film manufacturing company located in Ferrania (Liguria), Italy. Following closure of the original Ferrania factory in 2009 the company was re-founded in 2013 on a small part of the original site to build a new film manufacturing base using the former Ferrania research laboratory (L.R.F.) and its narrow coater. FILM Ferrania commenced manufacturing a black and white still film in February 2017 based on P30, a classic 1960s motion picture film stock.

Make	Name	Dates	Base	ISO	Process	Type	Details	Origin	Formats	Replaced by
Ferrania	P30 ALPHA	2017–2018	P	80	B&W	Print	Classic 1960s B&W panchromatic motion picture film for still photography. 'ALPHA' prototype version. Launched in February 2017, due to production constraints for 135 format conversion only a limited supply of film was made until early 2018 A 120 format version had been planned for 2018, but was not produced.	Italy	135-36	P30

== Film Photography Project ==
Established in 2009 by Michael Raso, Film Photography Project (FPP) sources a variety of still films including those originally made for technical, motion pictures, industrial or aerial applications for creative purposes. Therefore, films are often available for a limited period.

=== Black and white films ===
Make	Name	Dates	Base	ISO	Process	Type	Details	Origin	Formats	Replaced by
FPP	Kodak Vintage 1960 Expired – Linagraph Ortho	-	?	0	B&W	Print	ASA 0, expired 9/1960. Film of this age and unknown storage will have a base fog	US	135-20	
FPP	Kodak Positive Microfilm	-	?	0.8	B&W	Print	Kodak Direct Duplicating Microfilm 2468 this film has no sprocket holes but also produces a black and white positive slide when processed normal Kodak BW Positive Microfilm	US	135-20	
FPP	Kodak Camera 2000 CGP	-	?	0.8	B&W	Print	Kodak Camera 2000 CG is an extremely high contrast, orthochromatic film	US	135-20	
FPP	Eastman SO-331 High Contrast	-	?	25	B&W	Print	Eastman SO-331 High Contrast Pan Film	US	135-20	
FPP	Kodak LPD4 High Contrast	-	?		B&W	Print		US	135	
FPP	Kodak Fine Grain 2366	-	?		B&W	Print		US	135	
FPP	KODAK HIGH CON 5363	-	?	25	B&W	Print	Eastman High Contrast 5363 is a motion picture film originally designed for direct contact copying titles and mats in motion picture work. This blue-sensitive film* is characterized by high contrast, excellent sharpness, and very high resolving power. DX Coded.	US	135-24	
FPP	Kodak Kodalith	-	?		B&W	Print		US	135	
FPP	BW IR	-	P	200	B&W	Print	Film with infra-red characteristics		135-24	
FPP	Mr Brown Low ISO	-	?		B&W	Print			135	

=== Color negative films ===
Make	Name	Dates	Base	ISO	Process	Type	Details	Origin	Formats	Replaced by
FPP	Red Scale	-	T/P						135	Nothing
FPP	Fuji ITn Color Negative	-	T/P	6	C-41	Print	Fujifilm IT-N – a film originally designed to make negatives from slides. Low-speed stock that leans towards green. Yields unusual skin tones and great for night shots.	Japan	135-20	Nothing
FPP	Color 125	-	T/P	100	C-41	Print	A subdued, unique, fine grained, color film with a retro look unlike other color print film. The film boasts an unusual color palette.		120	Nothing
FPP	Kodak Hawkeye Super Color	-	T/P	200–400	C-41	Print	Traffic Surveillance Film. Film is balanced for daylight or electronic flash and can be used under mixed lighting. T-Grain fine grain film with high sharpness. DX Coded for 200 iso.	US	135-24	Nothing

=== Color reversal (slide) films ===
Make	Name	Dates	Base	ISO	Process	Type	Details	Origin	Formats	Replaced by
FPP	Color IR	unavailable	T/P	400	E-6	Slide	Color Infrared Film is identical to Kodak Aerochrome III 1443 – a true color positive infrared film that produces a color slide.		135	Nothing
FPP	FUJICHROME CDU II TUNGSTEN	unavailable	T/P	20	E-6	Slide	Lab duplicating film, CDU II is a low-iso film designed to be shot in tungsten or indoor light, this film will produce a blue hue when shot in daylight. No DX coding	Japan	135-24	Nothing

== Film Washi ==
Factory in Saint-Nazaire, France. Film Washi launched in 2013, producing a handcrafted film, handcoated on traditional Washi paper. Also converting other films industrially coated in larger factories and originally made for technical, motion pictures, industrial or aerial applications.

=== Black and white films ===
Make	Name	Dates	Base	ISO	Process	Type	Details	Origin	Formats	Replaced by
Film Washi	'A'	?–2022	P	12	B&W	Print	Orthochromatic leader film normally used as leader and protection tail for motion picture film copy. Fine grain and a very high contrast. Discontinuation announced 30 May 2022, stated due to price increases for new stock.	France	135	Nothing
Film Washi	'B'	?–2018	P	125	B&W	Print	Blue sensitive X-ray film	France	Sheet film	Nothing
Film Washi	'D'	?–2022	P	500	B&W	Print	Panchromatic Russian aerial surveillance negative film, offering high contrast and moderate grain. 75 μm base. Russian origin, Discontinuation announced 30 May 2022, stated due to the Russian invasion of Ukraine.	Russia/ France	135	Nothing
Film Washi	'G'	?–2018	P	80	B&W	Print	Green sensitive X-ray film	France	Sheet film	Nothing
Film Washi	'K'	?–2018	P	100	B&W	Print	Vintage aerial film – Converted from 3 km of (expired 2000) Kodak Plus-X Aerographic Film 2402	France	Sheet film	Nothing
Film Washi	'R'	?–2022	P	100	B&W	Print	Panchromatic paper designed for photo booth, converted and perforated to be used in classic 135 cameras. Russian origin, Discontinuation announced 30 May 2022, stated due to the Russian invasion of Ukraine.	Russia/ France	135	Nothing
Film Washi	'S'	?–2022	P	50	B&W	Print	Panchromatic motion picture sound recording film very fine grain and ultra high definition. Discontinuation announced 30 May 2022, stated due to price increases for new stock.	France	135, 120	Nothing

== Forte ==
Forte (Forte Photochemical Industry, Vác) was a Hungarian manufacturer of photographic film and paper products originally established in 1922. They ceased to manufacture products in January 2007. Only B&W films were coated by Forte. Color films were supplied by other manufacturers, and packaged into Forte branding.

=== Black and white film ===
Make	Name	Dates	Base	ISO	Process	Type	Details	Origin	Formats	Replaced by
Forte	Finechrom	1950s	T	50	B&W	Print	Orthochromatic black and white negative film.	Hungary	?	Nothing
Forte	Finepan	1950s	T	40	B&W	Print	Ortho-panchromatic black and white negative film.	Hungary	?	Fortepan 27
Forte	Fortepan 27	1960s–c1980	T	40	B&W	Print	Fine grain negative film. Speed 27° Sch.	Hungary	135, 120, 620	Fortepan 50
Forte	Fortepan Super 30	1960s–c1980	T	80	B&W	Print	General purpose negative film. Speed 30° Sch.	Hungary	135, 120	Fortepan 100
Forte	Portraitpan 30	1960s–c1980	T	80	B&W	Print	Negative film for portraiture. Matte back for retouching. Speed 30° Sch.	Hungary	120	Portraitpan 100
Forte	Fortepan Rapid 33	1960s–c1980	T	160	B&W	Print	Fast negative film. Speed 33° Sch.	Hungary	135, 120	Fortepan 200
Forte	Fortepan Ultra Rapid 36	1960s–c1980	T	320	B&W	Print	High speed negative film. Speed 36° Sch.	Hungary	?	Fortepan 400 Professional
Forte	Fortepan 50	1980s–?	T	50	B&W	Print	Fine grain B&W film.	Hungary	135, 120	Nothing
Forte	Fortepan 100	1980s–2007	T	100	B&W	Print	Traditional B&W film.	Hungary	135, 120	Nothing
Forte	Portraitpan 100	1980s–2007	T	100	B&W	Print	Black and white film for portraiture.	Hungary	120	Nothing
Forte	Fortepan 200	1980s–2007	T	200	B&W	Print	Traditional B&W film.	Hungary	135, 120, Sheet film	Nothing
Forte	Fortepan 400 Professional	1980s–?	T	400	B&W	Print		Hungary	120	Fortepan 400
Forte	Fortepan 400 Professional Extra	1980s–?	T	400	B&W	Print		Hungary	120	Fortepan 400
Forte	Fortepan 400	?–2007	T	400	B&W	Print	Traditional B&W film.	Hungary	135, 120, Sheet film	Nothing

=== Color negative films ===
Make	Name	Dates	Base	ISO	Process	Type	Details	Origin	Formats	Replaced by
Forte	Fortecolor	1969–1971	T	40	Agfacolor Process N	Print	General purpose daylight balanced color negative film. Rebranded Agfacolor CN17.	Germany, Hungary	135, 120	Fortecolor (new)
Forte	Fortecolor	1971–c1974	T	32	ORWO 9160	Print	General purpose daylight balanced color negative film. Rebranded ORWOCOLOR NC 16.	GDR, Hungary	135	Fortecolor (new)
Forte	Fortecolor	c1974–c1982	T	80	Agfacolor Process N	Print	General purpose color negative film for daylight. Most likely rebranded Agfacolor CNS.	Germany, Hungary	135, 120	Fortecolor II
Forte	Fortecolor II	1978–1988	T	100	C-41	Print	General purpose daylight balanced color negative film. Rebranded 3M Color Print.	Italy, Hungary	110, 126, 135, 120	Fortecolor FR 100
Forte	Fortecolor 400	1981–1988	T	400	C-41	Print	General purpose daylight balanced color negative film. Rebranded 3M Color Print 400.	Italy, Hungary	135	?
Forte	Fortecolor FR 100	1988–1990	T	100	C-41	Print	Probably rebranded Scotch Color 100.	Italy, Hungary	135	?
Forte	Fortecolor Super FG plus	?–c2000	T	100	C-41	Print	ISO 100 consumer color film – Ferrania Solaris FG	Italy, Hungary	135	Nothing
Forte	Fortecolor Super FR	c1990–2007	T	100, 200	C-41	Print	Consumer color film – Konica Color Super SR or Scotch Color	Japan, Hungary	135	Nothing
Forte	Fortecolor Super HR	?–2007	T	200	C-41	Print	Consumer color film – Konica Color Super SR200	Japan/Italy, Hungary	110	Nothing

=== Color reversal (slide) film ===
Make	Name	Dates	Base	ISO	Process	Type	Details	Origin	Formats	Replaced by
Forte	Fortecolor Slide	?–?	T	50	Forte	Slide	General purpose daylight balanced slide film.	?	135	?
Forte	Fortechrom	1973–c1986	T	50	ORWO 9165	Slide	General purpose daylight balanced slide film. Rebranded ORWOCHROM UT 18.	GDR, Hungary	135	?

== Foma ==
Fotochema, Hradec Králové was a manufacturer of photographic materials in Czechoslovakia. It was established in 1921 as a priavate company. In 1946 it was nationalized by a decree from the president of the republic. In 1950 all photochemical factories in socialist Czechoslovakia were united under national enterprise Fotochema, Hradec Králové. Fotochema had a broad manufacturing program which included black and white negative films, photographic papers, technical materials for medical, industrial and scientific use as well as color papers and color films.

In 1990 Fotochema's legal status was changed to state enterprise and all its subsidiary factories became independent. In 1995 Fotochema was privatised as Foma Bohemia spol. s r.o. and underwent a substantial change in manufacturing program and focused solely on black and white photographic and technical materials. Foma continues to manufacture black and white materials today.

=== Black and white films ===
Make	Name	Dates	Base	ISO	Process	Type	Details	Origin	Formats	Replaced by
Foma	Super Antihalo	1932–?	T	40	B&W	Print	Orthochromatic film with antihalation layer.	Czechoslovakia	127, 120, 620, 116, 117, 129	?
Foma	Super Brillant	1932–?	T	50	B&W	Print	Orthochromatic film. Steeper gradation than Super Antihalo. 135 films had prefix "Perfor".	Czechoslovakia	135, 127, 120, 620, 116, 117, 129	?
Foma	Gradual	1932–?	T	50	B&W	Print	Orthochromatic film with softer gradation. 135 films had prefix "Perfor".	Czechoslovakia	135, 127, 120, 620, sheet film	?
Foma	Ortopan Super	1932–?	T	50	B&W	Print	General purpose orthopanchromatic film.	Czechoslovakia	127, 120, 620	?
Foma	Panchro Super	1935–c1959	T	40	B&W	Print	General purpose panchromatic film. Before WWII 135 films had prefix "Perfor". Sheet film sold as "Izo-Panchro".	Czechoslovakia	135, 127, 120, 620, sheet film	Fomapan 17
Foma	Panchro Super Universal	?–c1959	T	40	B&W	Print	Panchro Super of second-grade quality. Sold for cheaper price.	Czechoslovakia	135, 120	Pionýr 17
Foma	Panchro Ultra / Ultrapan	?–c1959	T	100	B&W	Print	General purpose high speed panchromatic film. Renamed to "Ultrapan" by the end of 50s. Sheet film sold as "Izo-Ultrapan". Sheet film discontinued in mid 60s.	Czechoslovakia	135, 120, sheet film	Fomapan 21
Foma	Ultrapan Special	?–c1965	T	100	B&W	Print	Ultrapan of highest quality. Produced with tighter tolerance margins resulting in constant properties.	Czechoslovakia	135, 120	Nothing
Foma	Ultrapan Universal	?–c1959	T	100	B&W	Print	Ultrapan of second-grade quality. Sold for cheaper price.	Czechoslovakia	135, 120	Pionýr 21
Foma	Mikropan 15	c1953–c1965	T	25	B&W	Print	Very fine grain orthopanchromatic 16mm film for Mikroma cameras.	Czechoslovakia	Mikroma	Mikropan 17
Foma	Pionýr 17, Pionýr 21	c1958–c1965	T	40, 100	B&W	Print	Fomapan emulsions which didn't match the quality standards. Sold for a cheaper price. Intended for children and amateurs. Production stopped in the 60s.	Czechoslovakia	935, 127, 120, 620	Nothing
Foma	Fomapan 17 / Fomapan N 17	c1958–1985	T	40	B&W	Print	Very fine-grain panchromatic film.	Czechoslovakia	135-36, 635-36, 935-36, 127, 120, 620, 116, sheet film	Fomapan F 17
Foma	Fomapan 21 / Fomapan N 21	c1958–1985	T	100	B&W	Print	General purpose fine-grain panchromatic film.	Czechoslovakia	135-36, 635-36, 935-36, 127, 120, 620, 116, sheet film	Fomapan F 21
Foma	Fomapan Brilant 17	c1961–?	T	40	B&W	Print	Very fine-grain panchromatic film. Fomapan 17 with steeper contrast. Production stopped in the mid-70s.	Czechoslovakia	135-36, 635-36, 935-36, 127, 120, 620	Nothing
Foma	Fomapan Brilant 21	c1961–?	T	100	B&W	Print	Fine-grain panchromatic film. Fomapan 21 with steeper contrast. Production stopped in the mid-70s.	Czechoslovakia	135-36, 635-36, 935-36, 127, 120, 620	Nothing
Foma	Fomapan 24 / Fomapan N 24	c1961–1985	T	200	B&W	Print	General-purpose panchromatic film.	Czechoslovakia	135-36, 635-36, 935-36, 127, 120, 620	Nothing
Foma	Mikropan 17	1965–?	T	40	B&W	Print	Very fine grain panchromatic 16mm film for Mikroma cameras.	Czechoslovakia	Mikroma	Nothing
Foma	Fomapan 30 / Fomapan N 30	1967–1985	T	800	B&W	Print	High-speed panchromatic film with coarse grain and increased red sensitivity.	Czechoslovakia	135-36, 635-36, 935-36, 127, 120, 620	Fomapan F 27
Foma	Fomapan F 17	1983–1993	T	40	B&W	Print	Very fine-grain panchromatic film. Fomapan F films had a unified developing time for all speeds.	Czechoslovakia	135-36, 120	Nothing
Foma	Fomapan F 21	1983–1993	T	100	B&W	Print	General purpose fine-grain panchromatic film. Fomapan F films had a unified developing time for all speeds.	Czechoslovakia	135-36, 120	Fomapan 100
Foma	Fomapan F 21 Professional	1983–c1991	T	100	B&W	Print	High-quality fine-grain panchromatic film for professional use. Film surface was suitable for retouching.	Czechoslovakia	120	Fomapan 100 Professional
Foma	Fomapan F 27	1983–1993	T	400	B&W	Print	General purpose high-speed panchromatic film. Fomapan F films had a unified developing time for all speeds.	Czechoslovakia	135-36, 120	Fomapan 400
Foma	Fomapan Special	1987–1990	T	800	B&W	Print	High-speed panchromatic film with extended red sensitivity for low-light conditions or artificial light.	Czechoslovakia	135-36, 120	Fomapan T800
Foma	Fomapan Variant	1987–1990	T	1600	C-41	Print	Chromogenic film for black and white prints with extended red sensitivity. EI 100-3200 for daylight and EI 100-6400 for artificial light. It was recommended for high-contrast scenes.	Czechoslovakia	135-36, 120	Nothing
Foma	Dokument K	1984–c1990	T	2	B&W	Print/Slide	Microfilm film for making negative copies of documents, other uses include black and white slides and title cards.	Czechoslovakia	135-36, sheet film	Nothing
Foma	Fomapan 100 Professional	c1991–c2016	P	100	B&W	Print	Professional black and white roll film with matte back for retouching.	Czechoslovakia, Czech republic	120	Nothing
Foma	Fomapan T200	1994–1996	T/P	200	B&W	Print	New-generation film combining cubic grain and tabular grain technology. Kodak sued Foma for patent infringement. In 1996 renamed to Fomapan 200.	Czech republic	135, 120, sheet film	Fomapan 200
Foma	Fomapan T800	1994–1996	T/P	800	B&W	Print	New-generation film combining cubic grain and tabular grain technology. Kodak sued Foma for patent infringement. In 1996 renamed to Fomapan 800.	Czech republic	135, 120	Fomapan 800
Foma	Fomapan 800	1996–c2001	T/P	800	B&W	Print	Fomapan T800 emulsion after name change.	Czech republic	135, 120	Nothing
Foma	Retropan 320	2015–2021	T/P	320	B&W	Print	Retro panchromatic film with wide tonality and "soft" images. 135 format discontinued in 2019.	Czech republic	135-36, 120, sheet film	Nothing

=== Black and white reversal (slide) films ===
Black and white reversal films were initially sold as Fomapan 17, 21 and 24 with label on the box saying "black and white reversal film". During the 70s or at the beginning of the 80s the name was changed to "Fomapan R" (R for reversal).

Make	Name	Dates	Base	ISO	Process	Type	Details	Origin	Formats	Replaced by
Foma	Inverzní Fomapan 17 / Fomapan R 17	c1959–1991	T	40	Fomaset	Slide	Very fine-grain panchromatic slide film with slightly higher contrast.	Czechoslovakia	135-36, 935-36	Nothing
Foma	Inverzní Fomapan 21 / Fomapan R 21	c1959–1991	T	100	Fomaset	Slide	General purpose fine-grain panchromatic slide film for daylight and artificial light.	Czechoslovakia	135-36, 935-36	Fomapan R 100
Foma	Inverzní Fomapan 24 / Fomapan R 24	c1964–1991	T	200	Fomaset	Slide	High-speed panchromatic film for artificial light and heavy overcast weather. Extended red sensitivity.	Czechoslovakia	135-36, 935-36	Nothing

=== Color negative films ===
Make	Name	Dates	Base	ISO	Process	Type	Details	Origin	Formats	Replaced by
Foma	Fomacolor Negativ	1962–c1964	T	32	Fomacolor SN	Print	Unmasked color negative film for daylight with speed of 16° DIN. First color negative film manufactured by Foma. Based on Agfacolor.	Czechoslovakia	120	Fomacolor N 17
Foma	Fomacolor N 17 / Fomacolor ND 17	1964–c1975	T	40	Fomacolor SN	Print	Unmasked color negative film for daylight. Improved Fomacolor formulation. Around 1970 renamed to Fomacolor ND 17.	Czechoslovakia	135-20, 120, sheet film	Nothing
Foma	Fomacolor NU 17	?–c1971	T	40	Fomacolor SN	Print	Unmasked color negative film for artificial light. Probably a trial production. Last mention in 1971.	Czechoslovakia	135, 120, sheet film	Nothing
Foma	Fomacolor CN 100	1988–1990	T	100	C-41	Print	General purpose film for color prints. Rebranded Agfa stock.	Germany, Czechoslovakia	135	Nothing
Foma	Equicolor HR 100	1985–1988	T	100	C-41	Print	General purpose film for color prints. Made in partnership with Austrian company Equipex, which was working on behalf of Fujifilm. Rebranded Fujifilm HR 100 stock.	Japan, Czechoslovakia	135	Equicolor Super HR II 100
Foma	Equicolor Super HR II 100	1989–1991	T	100	C-41	Print	General purpose film for color prints. Rebranded Fujifilm Super HR 100 stock.	Japan, Czechoslovakia	135	Equicolor Super HG 100
Foma	Equicolor Super HG 100	c1996–c2000	T	100	C-41	Print	General purpose film for color prints. Rebranded Fujifilm Super HG 100.	Japan, Czech republic	135	Equicolor 100 Supria 2000
Foma	Equicolor 200	1997–c2000	T	200	C-41	Print	General purpose film for color prints. Rebranded Fujifilm stock.	Japan, Czech republic	135	Equicolor 200 Supria 2000
Foma	Fomacolor 100	1997–c2004	T	100	C-41	Print	General purpose film for color prints. Lower quality than Equicolor. Rebranded film made by 3M Ferrania.	Italy, Czech republic	135	Nothing
Foma	Fomacolor 200	1997–c2004	T	200	C-41	Print	General purpose film for color prints. Lower quality than Equicolor. Rebranded film made by 3M Ferrania.	Italy, Czech republic	135	Nothing
Foma	Fomacolor 400	1997–c1999	T	400	C-41	Print	General purpose film for color prints. Lower quality than Equicolor. Rebranded film made by 3M Ferrania.	Italy, Czech republic	135	Nothing
Foma	Equicolor 100 Supria 2000	2000–c2007	T	100	C-41	Print	General purpose film for color prints. It was a rebranded Fujifilm stock.	Japan, Czech republic	135	Equicolor Premium 100
Foma	Equicolor 200 Supria 2000	2000–c2007	T	200	C-41	Print	General purpose film for color prints. It was a rebranded Fujifilm stock.	Japan, Czech republic	135	Equicolor Premium 200
Foma	Equicolor 400 Supria 2000	c2000–c2007	T	400	C-41	Print	General purpose film for color prints. It was a rebranded Fujifilm stock.	Japan, Czech republic	135	Equicolor Premium 400
Foma	Equicolor Premium 100	c2009–2011	T	100	C-41	Print	General purpose film for color prints. Rebranded Fujifilm stock.	Japan, Czech republic	135	Nothing
Foma	Equicolor Premium 200	c2009–2011	T	200	C-41	Print	General purpose film for color prints. Rebranded Fujifilm stock.	Japan, Czech republic	135	Nothing
Foma	Equicolor Premium 400	2006–2012	T	400	C-41	Print	General purpose film for color prints. Rebranded Fujifilm stock.	Japan, Czech republic	135	Nothing

=== Color reversal (slide) films ===
Make	Name	Dates	Base	ISO	Process	Type	Details	Origin	Formats	Replaced by
Foma	Fomachrom D 16	1969–c1973	T	32	AP 41	Slide	Color reversal film for daylight. Trial production. Only available for a short period.	Czechoslovakia	135, 120	Fomachrom D 18
Foma	Fomachrom D 18	1971–1982	T	50	AP 41	Slide	Color reversal film for daylight (5500K).	Czechoslovakia	135-36, 120	Fomachrom-II D 18
Foma	Fomachrom D 20	1971–1982	T	80	AP 41	Slide	Color reversal film for daylight (5500K).	Czechoslovakia	135-36, 120	Fomachrom-II D 20
Foma	Fomachrom D 22	1971–1982	T	125	AP 41	Slide	Color reversal film for daylight (5500K).	Czechoslovakia	135-36, 120	Fomachrom-II D 22
Foma	Fomachrom A	c1975–c1978	T	?	AP 41	Slide	Color reversal film for artificial light (3200K). Last mention in 1978.	Czechoslovakia	135	Nothing
Foma	Fomachrom-II D 18	1981–1991	T	50	AP 41 / ORWO 9165	Slide	Second-generation color reversal film with improved contrast, grain and color layers.	Czechoslovakia	135-36, 120	Fomachrom RD 18
Foma	Fomachrom-II D 20	1981–1991	T	80	AP 41 / ORWO 9165	Slide	Second-generation color reversal film with improved contrast, grain and color layers.	Czechoslovakia	135-36, 120	Fomachrom RD 21
Foma	Fomachrom-II D 22	1981–1991	T	125	AP 41 / ORWO 9165	Slide	Second-generation color reversal film with improved contrast, grain and color layers.	Czechoslovakia	135-36, 120	Fomachrom RD 21
Foma	Fomachrom-II D 24	c1988–1990	T	200	AP 41 / ORWO 9165	Slide	Fomachrom-II D with speed of 24° DIN was introduced later around 1988-1989.	Czechoslovakia	135-36, 120	Fomachrom RD 24
Foma	Fomachrom RD 18	c1989–1991	T	50	E-6	Slide	Color reversal film for daylight.	Czechoslovakia	135-36, 120	Nothing
Foma	Fomachrom RD 21	1989–1992	T	100	E-6	Slide	First Fomachrom film made for E-6 process. Balanced for daylight. It had to go four times through the coating machine in order to coat 7-8 layers onto the film base. Last stocks expired 6.1994.	Czechoslovakia	135-36, 120	Nothing
Foma	Fomachrom RD 24	c1989–1991	T	200	E-6	Slide	Color reversal film for daylight.	Czechoslovakia	135-36, 120	Nothing
Foma	Fomachrom CR 100	c1996–2001	T	100	E-6	Slide	General purpose slide film balanced for daylight. Rebranded film made by 3M Ferrania.	Italy, Czech republic	135-36	Nothing

== FOTOIMPEX ==
FOTOIMPEX of Berlin, Germany, is a company founded in 1992 to import photographic films and papers from the former Eastern Bloc. They acquired the rights to the ADOX name in 2003. Two Black & White films produced by Harman Technology were sold under their own name.

Make	Name	Dates	Base	ISO	Process	Type	Details	Origin	Formats	Replaced by
FOTOIMPEX	CHM 100	?–c2022	T	100	B&W	Print	General purpose, panchromatic film similar to Kentmere 100	UK	135	Kentmere 100
FOTOIMPEX	CHM 400	?–c2022	T	400	B&W	Print	General purpose, panchromatic film similar to Kentmere 400	UK	135	Kentmere 400

== FOTON ==
FOTON was the brand name of Warszawskie Zakłady Fotochemiczne (WZF, Warsaw Photochemical Works) a Polish state owned enterprise established in 1949 in Warsaw producing photographic film. The company was established in a surviving building from the former Jozef Franaszek works on Ul. Wolska (Wolska Street) which had produced photographic and other specialised paper. The Franaszek works was burnt out in the Wola massacre in 1944 during the Warsaw Uprising.

The company manufactured X-ray and black and white cinema film, still camera film (from 1950) and microfilm. At the end of the 1950s, Fotoncolor cinematographic positive film for making screen copies was launched and for a brief period color negative film produced in the 1960s until a decision for the GDR (ORWO) to supply color film in Comecon countries. Black and white papers and plates and photochemicals and later color photographic papers under the FOTON brand were produced by a sister company at Bydgoskie Zakłady Fotochemiczne (BZF, Bydgoszcz Photochemical Works) dating from 1925 also in Warsaw at Ul. Garbary 3 (from 1970s at Ul. Piękna 13). In 1969 FOTON signed a licensing agreement with Ilford for the production of X-ray and photographic film, however various delays meant the new production line was not opened until the late 70s. FOTON ceased producing film in the 1990s. The buildings were taken over by FOTON Trading Sp. z o.o. and now they serve for commercial activity. Bydgoszcz Photochemical works was acquired by Foma Bohemia in 1997 but due to decline of the traditional film market was declared bankrupt in 2007.

=== Black and white films ===
Make	Name	Dates	Base	ISO	Process	Type	Details	Origin	Formats	Replaced by
WZF		c1950–1953	T	40	B&W	Print	Fine grain orthopanchromatic film. The first film produced by Warszawskie Zakłady Fotochemiczne. The trade names Foton or Fotopan had yet to be adopted. White packaging.	Poland	120	Fotopan
FOTON	Fotopan	1953–1958	T	32	B&W	Print	Fine grain orthopanchromatic film. Film speed in CUK scale (approx. 16° DIN). Green packaging.	Poland	935, 120	Fotopan F
FOTON	Fotopan F	c1958–c1978	T	50	B&W	Print	Fine-grained, orthopanchromatic, with anti-halation coating for amateur and professional photography in daylight and artificial light. ASA 32 for artificial light. Green packaging. 135 format was sold as Type 1, film in black wrapper (darkroom loading), Type 3 on a spool with paper leader (loading in dim light) and Type 4 in a film cartridge (daylight loading). Sheet film had matte back.	Poland	135, 635, 935, 127, 120, 620, sheet film	Fotopan FF
FOTON	Fotopan Super / S	c1958–c1978	T	100-125	B&W	Print	Highly sensitive, orthopanchromatic, with anti-halation coating for photos in low daylight and artificial light. ASA 100 later increased to 125. Yellow packaging. 135 format was sold as Types 1, 3, 4 same as Fotopan F.	Poland	135, 635, 935, 120, 620	Negatyw NB 01
FOTON	Fotopan Ultra / U	mid 50s–c1969	T	200	B&W	Print	Superpanchromatic emulsions with the highest sensitivity for night and reporter photos. Orange packaging.	Poland	135, 120	Fotopan N 200
FOTON	Fotopan N 200	1969–?	T	200	B&W	Print	Superpanchromatic emulsion. In the early 1970s FOTON received a large export order for a 200 speed film developed from Fotopan U and sold the surplus under its own brand as Fotopan N 200. Black/orange packaging.	Poland	135, 120	Fotopan SR
FOTON	Fotopan SR	mid 70s–80s	T	200	B&W	Print	Superpanchromatic successor to Fotopan N 200 with improved emulsion. Orange backaging.	Poland	135, 120	Negatyw NB 04
FOTON	Fotopan CD	1976–1979	T	400	B&W	Print	High speed panchromatic film. Brown on white packing. "CD" is a roman numeral for 400.	Poland	135, 120	Fotopan HL
FOTON	Fotopan FF	1977–mid 80s	T	50	B&W	Print	Panchromatic film. ASA 50 in daylight, ASA 40 in artificial light. Green on white packaging. Sheet film had matte back, sold in orange packaging.	Poland	135, 635, 120, sheet film	Fotopan FL
FOTON	Negatyw NB 04	1978–c1989	T	200	B&W	Print	General purpose panchromatic film for use in amateur, professional, artistic and scientific photography. Red on white packaging.	Poland	135, 635, 127, 120, 620	Nothing
FOTON	Negatyw NB 01	1979–c1989	T	100	B&W	Print	General purpose panchromatic film for amateur, professional, artistic and scientific photography. Blue on white packaging.	Poland	135, 635, 127, 120, 620	Black & White 100
FOTON	Fotopan HL	1979–1990s	T	400	B&W	Print	High speed panchromatic film, manufactured under licence from Ilford, based on HP4 film. Brown on white packing, green on black in the 90s.	Poland	135, 120	Nothing
FOTON	Fotopan FL	mid 80s–1990s	T	50	B&W	Print	Panchromatic film. Blue on white packaging but often packaged in the older Fotopan FF box with "FL" stamped across due to a shortage of new materials.	Poland	135, 120	Nothing
FOTON	Black & White 100	1990–late 90s	T	125	B&W	Print	General purpose panchromatic film from the Bydgoskie photochemical works. Final film sold under the FOTON brand.	Poland	135, 120	Nothing
FOTON	Mikrofilm Negatywowy	?–?	T	?	B&W	Print	Fine-grain, ortho-panchromatic 35mm film for line reproduction of documents, prints and drawings.	Poland	17m	Nothing
FOTON	Mikrofilm Negatywowy Super Orto	c1968–c1989	T	?	B&W	Print	Fine-grain orthochromatic 35mm film for line reproduction of documents, prints and drawings. 0.14mm thick base.	Poland	17m, 30.5m, 50m	Nothing
FOTON	Foto 65	c1984–c1990	T	80	B&W	Print	Imported soviet film Svema Foto 65. Repackaged at Warsaw photochemical works starting mid 80s.	USSR, Poland	135, 635	Nothing
FOTON	Foto 125	c1984–c1990	T	125	B&W	Print	Imported soviet film Svema Foto 125. Repackaged at Warsaw photochemical works starting mid 80s.	USSR, Poland	135, 635	Nothing
FOTON	NP 22	c1986–c1990	T	125	B&W	Print	Imported ORWO NP 22 film from the GDR. Repackaged at Warsaw photochemical works starting mid 80s.	GDR, Poland	135, 635	Nothing

=== Color negative films ===
Make	Name	Dates	Base	ISO	Process	Type	Details	Origin	Formats	Replaced by
FOTON	Fotoncolor NS	c1960–late 60s	T	32-50	?	Print	Unmasked negative daylight color film, speed initially ASA 32 later increased to ASA 50. Prices were cut by 25% in 1963 from 20zł to 15zł for 120 roll films. The film was discontinued due to a decision for the GDR (ORWO) to supply color negative film in Comecon countries. The color coating plant was moved to the Bydgoszcz factory and used to produce color photographic papers.	Poland	135-20, 127, 120, 620, sheet film	Nothing
FOTON	Equicolor Super HR 100	1989–?	T	100	CN-16 / C-41	Print	Imported Fujifilm stock repackaged at Warsaw photochemical works.	Japan, Poland	135	Equicolor Super HR II 100
FOTON	Equicolor Super HR II 100	?–1994	T	100	CN-16 / C-41	Print	Imported Fujifilm stock repackaged at Warsaw photochemical works.	Japan, Poland	135	Equicolor Super HG 100

=== Color reversal (slide) films ===
Make	Name	Dates	Base	ISO	Process	Type	Details	Origin	Formats	Replaced by
FOTON	Fomachrom II D 20	1990	T	80	AP 41	Slide	Imported Fomachrom-II D 20 from Czechoslovakia. Warsaw photochemical works began importing Fomachrom in 1990 and soon stopped due to changing economic situation.	ČSSR, Poland	135	Nothing

== Fuda ==
Xiamen Fuda Photographic Materials or Fuda was a Chinese manufacturer of photographic material based in Shanghai, China. In 1984, Kodak helped Fuda build their color film production line with color film being produced under license from Kodak. Kodak China acquired their assets in 1998.

=== Black and white film ===
Make	Name	Dates	Base	ISO	Process	Type	Details	Origin	Formats	Replaced by
FUDA	Fudapan	?–?	T	100	B&W	Print	Traditional B&W film	China	120	Nothing

=== Color negative film ===
Make	Name	Dates	Base	ISO	Process	Type	Details	Origin	Formats	Replaced by
FUDA	Color 100	c1984–c1990	T	100	C-41	Print	Consumer color film	China	135	Nothing
FUDA	Color GA 100	c1990–?	T	100	C-41	Print	Consumer color film	China	135	Nothing

== Fujifilm ==
FUJIFILM is a Japanese manufacturer of photographic films, papers and cameras established in 1934. Fujifilm stopped making traditional black and white films and photographic papers in 2018 but in 2019 announced a return to black and white film. They also produce a range of traditional color negative and reversal films (and associated photographic papers and photochemicals) as well as instant film. See Fujifilm photographic films and List of photographic films. Historically, however, they were one of the major producers of color negative and slide films producing a wide range of own brand professional and consumer films in competition with Kodak and Agfa-Gevaert. (The other main color film producers; Konica and 3M Ferrania specialising in 'white label' consumer product). The film range is divided into black and white film Neopan, Color negative film Fujicolor and Color slide film Fujichrome together with instant 'pack film'. They also undertook contract manufacture for AGFA PHOTO color negative/slide films from c2008-2018.

=== Black and white film ===
Make	Name	Dates	Base	ISO	Process	Type	Details	Origin	Formats	Replaced by
FUJI	Chrome Film	1936–1950s	?	?	B&W	Print	Orthochromatic film.	Japan	120	
FUJI	Neochrome Film	1936–1950s	?	?	B&W	Print	Orthochromatic film with extended color sensitivity.	Japan	120	
FUJI	Neopanchromatic Film	1937–1950s	?	?	B&W	Print	Panchromatic film.	Japan	120	
FUJI	Portrait Cut Film Ortho	1938–?	?	?	B&W	Print	Orthochromatic film for portraiture.	Japan	sheet film	
FUJI	35mm Film SP	1938–1950s	?	40	B&W	Print	Panchromatic film.	Japan	135	
FUJI	35mm Film FP	1940–1950s	?	?	B&W	Print	Panchromatic film with finer grain.	Japan	135	
FUJIFILM	Neopan SS	1953–2012	T	100	B&W	Print	General purpose classical cubic-crystal ortho-panchromatic film with wide exposure latitude. Asia and selected markets only (Parallel import elsewhere)	Japan	135, Rapid, 120, sheet film	Neopan 100 ACROS
FUJIFILM	Neopan F	c1954–2000s	?	32	B&W	Print	Ultra fine-grain panchromatic film.	Japan	135, 120	Nothing
FUJIFILM	Neopan S	c1954–?	N	50	B&W	Print	Fine-grain panchromatic film on nitrate base.	Japan	135, 120	Nothing
FUJIFILM	Neopan SSS	c1954–1980s	T	200	B&W	Print	High-speed panchromatic film.	Japan	135, Rapid, 120, sheet film	Neopan 400
FUJIFILM	Neopan 100 ACROS	2000–Apr 2018	T/P	100	B&W	Print	Fine grain ortho-panchromatic 'T' grain film noted for its low rate of reciprocity failure making it ideal for long exposures. 135, 120 (T base), 4x5", 8x10" (P base). Sheet film was discontinued May 17. 135 and 120 formats were discontinued in April 2018. 120 format was sold out by June 2018, while 135 format remained on sale until Jan-May 2019 (Varies by market). As Fujifilm's final Black and white process film – Fujifilm black and white papers were discontinued in Japan at the same time.	Japan	135, 120, 4x5”, 8x10”	Neopan 100 ACROS II
FUJIFILM	Neopan 400 Professional	1978–2014	T	400	B&W	Print	Professional general purpose monosize cubic-crystal grain panchromatic film. Called 'Presto' in Japan.	Japan	135, 120	Nothing
FUJIFILM	Neopan 1600 Professional	?–2010	T	1600	B&W	Print	Professional high speed panchromatic film with E.I. 1600 for sports, journalism, stage shows and low light situations. Called 'Super Presto' in Japan. Same development time as Neopan 400.	Japan	135	Nothing
FUJIFILM	Neopan 400CN	2003–2020	T	400	C-41	Print	General purpose C-41 process chromogenic black and white film. Ilford were Fuji's partners for this film which has therefore similar characteristics to Ilford XP2 plus. UK market only. Discontinued in 2020.	UK	135–36, 120 (UK only)	Nothing

=== Color negative film ===
- 200 ISO Super HG II (135) 4th color-sensitive emulsion layer; Captures true color even under fluorescent lights; Two-Stage Timing DIR Couplers improve color brilliance; Enhance edges for outstanding sharpness
- 400 ISO Super HG c1991 on (DIRR couplers, sigma crystal emulsion)
- 1600 ISO Super HG (135) 135-36
- 100 ISO Super G (110) ?–1995
- 100 ISO Super G Plus (135) 1995–2000 "Plus films" = "RT (Real-Tone) Technology" controls the interlayer (color saturation enhancing) effect to produce natural, fine textured skin tones and "ELS (Emulsion Layer Stabilizing) Technology." film stabilser to maintain control the more than 100 organic chemical compounds found in the Super G Plus films
- 200 ISO Super G plus (110, 135) 1995–2000
- 400 ISO Super G plus (135, 120) 1995–2000
- 800 ISO Super G Plus CZ (135) 1995–2000
- 100 ISO Quality (135) (Brazil)
- 100 ISO Quality II (135) (Brazil)
- C100 ISO Basic color film

Make	Name	Dates	Base	ISO	Process	Type	Details	Origin	Formats	Replaced by
Consumer films
FUJIFILM	Fujicolor Negative	1958–?	T	32	Agfa	Print	Unmasked color negative film with universal light balance. 35mm film introduced in 1959.	Japan	135-20, 120	Fujicolor N
FUJIFILM	Fujicolor N	1961–?	T	50	Agfa	Print	General purpose unmasked color negative film.	Japan	135, 120, sheet film	Fujicolor N64
FUJIFILM	Fujicolor N64	1963–?	T	64	Agfa	Print	First color negative film from Fujifilm to feature an orange mask.	Japan	135, Rapid, 120, sheet film	Nothing
FUJIFILM	Fujicolor N100	1965–?	T	100	Agfa	Print	General purpose masked color negative film.	Japan	135, 120	New Fujicolor N100
FUJIFILM	New Fujicolor N100	1971–?	T	100	CN-15 / C-22	Print	Reformulated Fujicolor N100 to match Kodak's color principle.	Japan	135, 120	Fujicolor F-II
FUJIFILM	Fujicolor F-II	1974–?	T	100	CN-16 / C-41	Print	General purpose color negative film for daylight.	Japan	110, 135, 120	Fujicolor HR 100
FUJIFILM	Fujicolor F-II 400 / Fujicolor 400	1976–2017	T	400	CN-16 / C-41	Print	World's first 400 ASA film. Announced at Photokina 1976. Renamed Fujicolor 400 in 1980. General purpose color film sold in 24 or 36 exp packs. Sold in plain white box to companies. Available in 100 pack. Also sold individually by retailers as a budget film. Discontinued 2017. (Edge markings same as Superia X-tra 400). Parallel import elsewhere	Japan	110, 135, 120	Fujicolor HR 400
FUJIFILM	Fujicolor HR 100	1983–?	T	100	CN-16 / C-41	Print	General purpose color negative film with vast improvements to sharpness and color rendition.	Japan	110, 135, 120	Fujicolor Super HR 100
FUJIFILM	Fujicolor HR 200	1983–?	T	200	CN-16 / C-41	Print	General purpose color negative film with vast improvements to sharpness and color rendition.	Japan	135	Fujicolor Super HR 200
FUJIFILM	Fujicolor HR 400	1983–?	T	400	CN-16 / C-41	Print	General purpose color negative film with vast improvements to sharpness and color rendition.	Japan	110, 135, 120	Fujicolor Super HR 400
FUJIFILM	Fujicolor HR 1600	1984–?	T	1600	CN-16 / C-41	Print	World's first highest sensitivity color negative film.	Japan	135	Fujicolor Super HR 1600
FUJIFILM	Fujicolor HR Disc Film	1984–?	T	200	CN-16 / C-41	Print	General purpose color negative film for disc cameras.	Japan	Disc	?
FUJIFILM	Fujicolor Super HR 100	1986–?	T	100	CN-16 / C-41	Print	General purpose color film. (CN)	Japan	110, 126, 135, 120	Fujicolor Super HG 100
FUJIFILM	Fujicolor Super HR 200	1986–?	T	200	CN-16 / C-41	Print	General purpose color film. (CA)	Japan	135, 120	Fujicolor Super HG 200
FUJIFILM	Fujicolor Super HR 400	1986–?	T	400	CN-16 / C-41	Print	General purpose color film. (CH)	Japan	135, 120	Fujicolor Super HG 400
FUJIFILM	Fujicolor Super HR 1600	?–?	T	1600	CN-16 / C-41	Print	General purpose color film. (CU)	Japan	135, 120	Fujicolor Super HG 1600
FUJIFILM	Fujicolor Super HG 100	1989–?	T	100	CN-16 / C-41	Print	General purpose color film.	Japan	135, 120	?
FUJIFILM	Fujicolor Super HG 200	1989–?	T	200	CN-16 / C-41	Print	General purpose color film.	Japan	135	?
FUJIFILM	Fujicolor Super HG 400	1989–?	T	400	CN-16 / C-41	Print	General purpose color film.	Japan	135	?
FUJIFILM	Fujicolor Super HG 1600	1989–?	T	1600	CN-16 / C-41	Print	General purpose color film.	Japan	135	?
FUJIFILM	Fujicolor Superia Reala	1989–2013	T	100	CN-16 / C-41	Print	A premium ISO 100-speed emulsion delivering exceptional color accuracy. The finest, smoothest grain and the best sharpness of all Superia films. First 4th layer technology film for improved colors (no greenish cast) under fluorescent lighting later extended to fujifilm Superia and Pro color negative films (CS). Last available in 120 format	Japan	135, 120, 220	Nothing
FUJIFILM	Fujicolor C200	c1990–2021	T	200	CN-16 / C-41	Print	General purpose budget color film updated 2017 with super fine grain technology. No official discontinuation announcement but now replaced by 'Fujifilm 200' in new packaging Multipacks and 24 exp rolls discontinued 2017. (Code CA24). Discontinued US market from 2021 and Europe 2022 on.	Japan	135-36	Fujifilm 200
FUJIFILM	Fujicolor Superia 100	1998–2009?	T	100	CN-16 / C-41	Print	General purpose consumer color film using 4th layer technology (CN).	Japan	135, 120	Fujicolor 100 (Japan only)
FUJIFILM	Fujicolor Superia 200	1998–2017	T	200	CN-16 / C-41	Print	General purpose consumer color film using 4th layer technology (CA). Along with the iso 400 variant, the unbiquitous consumer film of the late 90s/early 2000s competing with Kodacolor Gold 200/400. On discontinuation older tech Fujifilm C200 advised as alternative.	Japan	135	Fujicolor C200
FUJIFILM	Fujicolor Superia 400	1998?–c2003	T	400	CN-16 / C-41	Print	General purpose consumer color film. Replaced by X-tra 400 with sigma fine grain technology from Pro films.	Japan	135	Superia X-tra 400
FUJIFILM	Fujicolor Superia X-tra 800	2000–2016	T	800	CN-16 / C-41	Print	General purpose consumer color film using 4th layer & sigma fine grain technology (CZ). Superia 800 branded stock discontinued 2016 outside Japan with final stock dated exp. 8/18. Japanese market version, Venus 800 remained on sale for a further 3 years.	Japan	135-36	Venus 800 (Japan)
FUJIFILM	Fujicolor Superia X-tra 400	2003–2024	T	400	CN-16 / C-41	Print	'All conditions' consumer color film updated 2011, with improved shelf life and super uniform fine grain technology. (Originally with a 4th cyan color layer for improved colors under fluorescent lighting, omitted in recent revisions) (code CH23). Discontinued SKU; 120 in 2013; 135 x3 (except Japan/US) and 24 exp rolls in 2017. 135 in 2024	Japan	135-36	Fujifilm 400
FUJIFILM	Fujicolor Superia 1600 / Natura 1600	2003–2017	T	1600	CN-16 / C-41	Print	General purpose high speed color film using 4th layer & sigma fine grain technology (CU). Superia 1600 discontinued 2016 outside Japan, with final stock dated exp. 8/18. Natura 1600 the Japanese market version continued on sale, parallel import elsewhere. Natura discontinued Oct 2017, stock lasted on sale to mid 2018.	Japan	135-36	Nothing
FUJIFILM	Fujicolor True Definition 400	c2004–?	T	400	CN-16 / C-41	Print	General purpose consumer color film using 4th layer technology, US market only. More natural colors than Superia 400 (CH-11)	Japan	135	Superia X-tra 400
FUJIFILM	Fujicolor Superia Venus 800	?–May 2019	T	800	CN-16 / C-41	Print	High speed consumer color film using 4th layer and nano grain technology aimed at zoom lens compact cameras. Superia X-tra 800 discontinued 2016 outside Japan. Venus 800 Japanese market variant, parallel import elsewhere. Discontinuation in Japan announced May 2019. European retailers also reported parallel imports have stopped. Stock in Japan lasted until Spring 2020. The 800 iso waterproof camera was discontinued at the same time.	Japan	135-27 /36	Nothing
Professional films
FUJIFILM	Fujicolor Negative Film Type S	1965–c1972	P	80	CN-15 / C-22	Print	Professional color negative film for short exposures. Balanced for daylight.	Japan	sheet film	Fujicolor N Professional Type S
FUJIFILM	Fujicolor Negative Film Type L	1966–c1972	P	32	CN-15 / C-22	Print	Professional color negative film for long exposures. Balanced for artificial light.	Japan	sheet film	Fujicolor N Professional Type L
FUJIFILM	Fujicolor N Professional Type S	1972–c1981	T/P	100	CN-15 / C-22	Print	Professional color negative film for short exposures with improved film speed.	Japan	120, sheet film	Fujicolor F-II Professional Type S
FUJIFILM	Fujicolor N Professional Type L	1972–c1981	T/P	50	CN-15 / C-22	Print	Professional color negative film for long exposures with improved film speed.	Japan	120, sheet film	Fujicolor F-II Professional Type L
FUJIFILM	Fujicolor F-II Professional Type S	1976–c1980	P	100	CN-16 / C-41	Print	Professional film incorporating the improvements from Fujicolor F-II.	Japan	120, sheet film	Fujicolor 100 Professional Type S
FUJIFILM	Fujicolor F-II Professional Type L	1976–c1980	P	80	CN-16 / C-41	Print	Professional film incorporating the improvements from Fujicolor F-II.	Japan	120, sheet film	Fujicolor 80 Professional Type L
FUJIFILM	Fujicolor 100 Professional Type S	1980–c1984	T/P	100	CN-16 / C-41	Print	Professional film incorporating the improvements from Fujicolor F-II 400.	Japan	120, sheet film	Fujicolor 160 Professional S
FUJIFILM	Fujicolor 80 Professional Type L	1980–c1984	T/P	80	CN-16 / C-41	Print	Professional film incorporating the improvements from Fujicolor F-II 400.	Japan	120, sheet film	Fujicolor 160 Professional L
FUJIFILM	Fujicolor 160 Professional S	1984–?	T/P	160	CN-16 / C-41	Print	Professional film for daylight. (NSP)	Japan	120, sheet film	Fujicolor NPS 160?
FUJIFILM	Fujicolor 160 Professional L	1984–?	T/P	160	CN-16 / C-41	Print	Professional film for artificial light. (NLP)	Japan	120, sheet film	Fujicolor NPL 160?
FUJIFILM	Fujicolor NPS 160	?–2004	T/P	160	CN-16 / C-41	Print	Daylight-type color negative film for 'S'hort exposures designed for professional use. 120, 220 (T base), 4x5", 8x10"(P base)	Japan	120, 220, sheet film	PRO 160S
FUJIFILM	Fujicolor NPC 160	?–2004	T	160	CN-16 / C-41	Print	Daylight-type color negative film designed for professional use, higher 'C'ontrast than NPS'	Japan	135, 120, 220	PRO 160C
FUJIFILM	Fujicolor NPL 160	?–2004	T	160	CN-16 / C-41	Print	Professional Tungsten balanced color film primarily for studio portraits and copying, suitable for 'L'ong exposures. Not carried forward into PRO line	Japan	135, 120, 220	Nothing
FUJIFILM	Fujicolor PRO 160S	2004–2010	T/P	160	CN-16 / C-41	Print	Daylight balanced natural color professional film with 4th color layer & sigma fine grain technology, featuring more highly optimized skin tone reproduction and neutral gray balance, especially important for wedding and portrait photography. Renamed PRO 160NS in 2010. 120, 220 (T base), 4x5", 8x10"(P base)	Japan	135, 120, 220, Sheet film	PRO 160NS
FUJIFILM	Fujicolor PRO 160C	2004–2010	T	160	CN-16 / C-41	Print	Daylight-type color negative film with 4th color layer & sigma fine grain technology designed for professional use, featuring a gradation design optimized for exposures requiring high-contrast results.	Japan	135, 120, 220	Nothing
FUJIFILM	Fujicolor PRO 160NS	2010–2021 (To 2017 UK, 2018 EU)	T	160	CN-16 / C-41	Print	Professional color film with 4th color layer offering fine grain, low contrast and natural skin tones for weddings, portraits, fashion. Europe, Asia and Australia markets, renamed from 160S. Discontinued; 220, sheet film (2016), 120 (UK late 2017, rest of Europe late 2018) and Japan October 2021, which ended the Fujicolor Pro range of color negative films, predicted end of supply March 2022 but sold out almost immediately in Japan.	Japan	120, Sheet film	Nothing
FUJIFILM	Fujicolor NPH 400	2002–2004	T	400	CN-16 / C-41	Print	Professional fine-grained 400 speed film now features improved skin tones, much more accurate color reproduction, better shadow detail, and wider exposure latitude. It features Fuji's new peel and stick paper backing. Renamed in 2004 PRO 400H with no change to the emulsion.	Japan	135, 120, 220	PRO 400H
FUJIFILM	Fujicolor PRO 400H	2004-2021	T	400	CN-16 / C-41	Print	Professional color film with 4th color layer offering fine grain, low contrast and natural skin tones for weddings, portraits, fashion, renamed from NPH 400 at launch of the PRO 160S/C emulsions. Discontinued; 220 format in 2013, end of 135 and 120 formats in all markets was announced 14 January 2021 due to difficulty sourcing some raw materials. End of supply; (135 format) immediate, (120 format) March 2022, later brought forward to June 21 in Japan due to demand, final stock remained on sale in Europe to Summer 2022.	Japan	135–36, 120	Nothing
FUJIFILM	Fujicolor NPZ 800	2002–2004	T	800	CN-16 / C-41	Print	Professional fine-grained 800 speed film now features improved skin tones, much more accurate color reproduction, better shadow detail, and wider exposure latitude. It features Fuji's new peel and stick paper backing. Renamed in 2004 PRO 800Z with no change to the emulsion.	Japan	135, 120, 220	PRO 800Z
FUJIFILM	Fujicolor PRO 800Z	2004–2009	T	800	CN-16 / C-41	Print	Fine grain high speed natural color professional film for Weddings, portraits, fashion with 4th color layer, Renamed from NPZ 800 to bring it into line with the new 160 line of films	Japan	135, 120, 220	Nothing
FUJIFILM	Fujicolor Press 400	?–?	T	400	CN-16 / C-41	Print	Professional version of Superia 400 (cold stored)	Japan	135	Nothing
FUJIFILM	Fujicolor Press 800	?–c2008	T	800	CN-16 / C-41	Print	Professional version of Superia 800 (cold stored). Last batch exp. 2009	Japan	135	Nothing
FUJIFILM	Fujicolor Press 1600	?–?	T	800	CN-16 / C-41	Print	Professional version of Superia 1600 (cold stored)	Japan	135	Nothing

=== Color reversal (slide) film ===
Make	Name	Dates	Base	ISO	Process	Type	Details	Origin	Formats	Replaced by
Consumer films
FUJIFILM	Fujicolor	1948–c1961	T	10	Agfa	Slide	General purpose slide film for daylight. 35mm film introduced in 1949.	Japan	135-20, 120, sheet film	Fujicolor R100
FUJIFILM	Fujicolor R100	1961–c1966	T	100	Agfa	Slide	General purpose slide film for daylight.	Japan	135, 120	New Fujicolor R100
FUJIFILM	New Fujicolor R100 / Fujichrome R100	1966–?	T	100	CR-55 / E-4	Slide	Reformulated Fujicolor R100 to match Kodak's color principle. 126 film sold as "Fujichrome RK".	Japan	135, 126, 120	Fujichrome 100
FUJIFILM	Fujichrome 50	1980s–?	T	50	CR-56 / E-6	Slide	General purpose color reversal film for daylight.	Japan	135	?
FUJIFILM	Fujichrome 100	1980s–?	T	100	CR-56 / E-6	Slide	General purpose color reversal film for daylight.	Japan	135	?
FUJIFILM	Fujichrome 400	1980s–?	T	400	CR-56 / E-6	Slide	General purpose color reversal film for daylight.	Japan	135	?
FUJIFILM	Fujichrome Sensia 100	1994–1997	T	100	CR-56 / E-6	Slide	General purpose consumer, daylight-type color reversal film with faithful color reproduction and fine grain (RA)	Japan	135	Fujichrome Sensia II 100
FUJIFILM	Fujichrome Sensia II 100	1997–2003	T	100	CR-56 / E-6	Slide	General purpose consumer, daylight-type color reversal film with faithful color reproduction and fine grain (RAII)	Japan	135	Fujichrome Sensia III 100
FUJIFILM	Fujichrome Sensia III 100	2003–2011	T	100	CR-56 / E-6	Slide	General purpose consumer, daylight-type color reversal film with faithful color reproduction and fine grain (RAIII).	Japan	135	Nothing
FUJIFILM	Fujichrome Sensia 200	1994–2010	T	200	CR-56 / E-6	Slide	General purpose consumer, daylight-type color reversal film with faithful color reproduction and fine grain (RM).	Japan	135	Nothing
FUJIFILM	Fujichrome Sensia 400	1994–2010	T	400	CR-56 / E-6	Slide	Multi-use, high-speed, daylight-type color reversal film providing fine grain and vibrant color reproduction in spite of its high speed for sports, portraiture, nighttime photography, astrophotography, portraiture, and snapshots (RH).	Japan	135	Nothing
Professional films
FUJIFILM	Fujicolor Reversal Professional Daylight Type	1969–?	P	50	CR-55 / E-4	Slide	Professional color reversal film for daylight.	Japan	sheet film	?
FUJIFILM	Fujicolor Reversal Professional Tungsten Type	1970–?	P	32	CR-55 / E-4	Slide	Professional color reversal film for artificial light.	Japan	sheet film	?
FUJIFILM	Fujichrome Professional Type D	1972–c1978	T	100	CR-55 / E-4	Slide	Professional color reversal film for daylight.	Japan	120	Fujichrome 100 Professional D
FUJIFILM	Fujichrome Professional Type T	1972–c1979	T	100	CR-55 / E-4	Slide	Professional color reversal film for artificial light.	Japan	120	Fujichrome 64 Professional T
FUJIFILM	Fujichrome 100 Professional D	1978–1994	T/P	100	CR-56 / E-6	Slide	Professional-quality, medium-speed, daylight-type color reversal film with ultrafine grain, designed to provide medium color saturation and contrast (RDP).	Japan	135, 120, sheet film	Provia 100
FUJIFILM	Fujichrome 64 Professional T	1979–1999	T/P	64	CR-56 / E-6	Slide	Professional-quality, medium-speed, tungsten-type color reversal film with natural color reproduction for product photography, interiors and for reproducing illustrations and paintings (RTP). Emulsion changed in 1983 and name changed to Fujichrome Professional T. Emulsion changed again in 1987	Japan	135, 120, Sheet film	Fujichrome 64T
FUJIFILM	Fujichrome 400 Professional D	1980–1994	T/P	400	CR-56 / E-6	Slide	Professional-quality, high-speed, daylight-type color reversal film with the finest grain in its class and highly saturated colors (RHP). Suited to such uses as sports photography, reportage, and stage show coverage. Emulsion changes were made in 1992.	Japan	135, 120, sheet film	Provia 400
FUJIFILM	Fujichrome 50 Professional D	1983–c1994	T/P	50	CR-56 / E-6	Slide	Very fine grain color reversal film for daylight.	Japan	135, 120, sheet film	Fujichrome Velvia
FUJIFILM	Fujichrome 1600 Professional D	1984–1994	T/P	1600	CR-56 / E-6	Slide	Highly suited for low light photography, this film is appropriate to indoor and nighttime sports as well as nightfall illuminated and available light photography (RSP)	Japan	135	Provia 1600
FUJIFILM	Fujichrome Velvia	1990–2005	T	50	CR-56 / E-6	Slide	Velvia for Professionals (RVP). Professional-quality, medium-speed, daylight-type color reversal film with high sharpness, highly saturated colors, and fine grain for landscapes, marine and product photography. Sheet film 4x5, 8x10	Japan	135, 120, 220, Sheet film	Velvia 50
FUJIFILM	Fujichrome Provia 100	1994–2000	T	100	CR-56 / E-6	Slide	Professional-quality, medium-speed, daylight-type color reversal film with ultrafine grain, designed to provide medium color saturation and contrast (RDPII).	Japan	135, 120	Provia 100F
FUJIFILM	Fujichrome Provia 400	1994–2000	T	400	CR-56 / E-6	Slide	Professional-quality, high-speed, daylight-type color reversal film with the finest grain in its class and highly saturated colors (RHPII). Suited to such uses as sports photography, reportage, and stage show coverage	Japan	135, 120	Provia 400F
FUJIFILM	Fujichrome Provia 1600	1994–2000	T	1600	CR-56 / E-6	Slide	Highly suited for low light photography, this film is appropriate to indoor and nighttime sports as well as nightfall illuminated and available light photography (RSPII)	Japan	135	Nothing
FUJIFILM	Fujichrome Astia 100	1997–2003	T/P	100	CR-56 / E-6	Slide	Professional-quality, medium-speed, daylight-type color reversal film with ultrafine grain, subdued color reproduction and the softest tone reproduction among the 100 ISO films. Portrait/fashion orientated film with soft tones and lower contrast (RAP100). Sheet film 4x5, 8x10	Japan	135, 120, 220, Sheet film	Astia 100F
FUJIFILM	Fujichrome 64T	1999–2005	T/P	64	CR-56 / E-6	Slide	Professional-quality, medium-speed, tungsten-type color reversal film with natural color reproduction for product photography, interiors and for reproducing illustrations and paintings (RTPII).	Japan	135, 120, Sheet film	Fujichrome T64
FUJIFILM	Fujichrome Provia 400F	2000–2006	T	400	CR-56 / E-6	Slide	Professional-quality, high-speed, daylight-type color reversal film with the finest grain in its class and highly saturated colors (RHPIII). Suited to such uses as sports photography, reportage, and stage show coverage	Japan	135, 120	Provia 400X
FUJIFILM	Fujichrome Velvia 100F	2002–2021 (To 2012 Eur. NOAM)	T/P	100	CR-56 / E-6	Slide	Professional-quality, medium-speed, daylight-type color reversal film with ultrafine grain, designed to produce high-contrast images with the highest color saturation among 100F series films for landscape, nature, commercial, food, and interior applications (RVP100F). Sheet film 4x5, 8x10. All formats discontinued 2012 outside Japan, Discontinued in Japan; 120 (2015) Sheet film; 4x5, 8x10 remained on sale until 2021.	Japan	135, 120, 220, Sheet film	Nothing
FUJIFILM	Fujichrome Astia 100F	2003–2012	T/P	100	CR-56 / E-6	Slide	Professional-quality, medium-speed, daylight-type color reversal film with ultrafine grain, subdued color reproduction and the softest tone reproduction among the 100F films. Portrait/fashion orientated film with soft tones and lower contrast (RAP100F). Sheet film 4x5, 8x10	Japan	135, 120, 220, Sheet film	Nothing
FUJIFILM	Fujichrome Fortia / Fortia SP	2004–2007	T	50	CR-56 / E-6	Slide	A Japan only ultra high saturation slide film released for the cherry blossom season, possibly a variant of Velvia 50. Initially released a limited run in 2004 as Fortia, following by Fortia SP (2005–07)	Japan	135, 120	Nothing
FUJIFILM	Fujichrome Provia 400X	2006–2013	T	400	CR-56 / E-6	Slide	Professional-quality, daylight-type ISO 400 color reversal film, fine grain (Epitaxial Sigma Crystal technology) and sharpness, vivid color reproduction and regulated gray balance to match Provia 100F with improved color image storage permanence (RXP)	Japan	135, 120	Nothing
FUJIFILM	Fujichrome T64	2005–?	T/P	64	CR-56 / E-6	Slide	Professional-quality, medium-speed, tungsten-type color reversal film with natural color reproduction for product photography, interiors and for reproducing illustrations and paintings (RTPIII?). Sheet film 4x5, 8x10	Japan	135, 120, Sheet film	Nothing
FUJIFILM	Fujichrome MS 100/1000	?–?	T	100/ 1000	CR-56 / E-6	Slide	Variable ISO Slide Film.	Japan	135, 120	Nothing

=== Instant film ===
Make	Name	Dates	Base	ISO	Process	Type	Details	Origin	Formats	Replaced by
FUJIFILM	Instant Color Film FP-100C / FP-100C Silk	2003–2016	T	100	Instant	Print	Professional peel-apart type ISO 100 instant color film for daylight / electronic flash. Gloss or Silk finish. Traditionally used with medium format camera instant backs for studio test shots but high volumes also used for visas and other identity documents. Discontinuation of pack film in 2016 made a large amount of camera equipment redundant. Photosize 85x108mm & 102x131mm.	Japan	3.25x4.25", 4×5"	Nothing
FUJIFILM	Instant Black & White Film FP-100B Super	2003–2016	T	100	Instant	Print		Japan	3.25x4.25", 4×5"	Nothing
FUJIFILM	Instant Black & White Film FP-3000B Super Speedy	2003–2013	T	3000	Instant	Print	Professional peel-apart panchromatic material suited for identification, portraiture and other general imaging applications. 10 exposure packs. Photosize 85x108mm and 102x131mm	Japan	3.25×4.25", 4×5"	Nothing

== Gevaert ==
Gevaert was a Belgian film and photographic paper manufacturer. Production ended after merging with Agfa.

=== Black and white film ===
Make	Name	Dates	Base	ISO	Process	Type	Details	Origin	Formats	Replaced by
Gevaert	Gevachrome 30	?–1950s	T	80	B&W	Print	B&W orthochromatic film.	Belgium	120	Nothing
Gevaert	Gevapan 27	?–1960s	T	40	B&W	Print	Traditional B&W film	Belgium	135, 120	Nothing
Gevaert	Gevapan 30	?–1960s	T	80	B&W	Print	Traditional B&W film	Belgium	135, 120	Nothing
Gevaert	Gevapan 33	?–1960s	T	160	B&W	Print	Traditional B&W film	Belgium	135, 120	Nothing
Gevaert	Gevapan 36	?–1960s	T	320	B&W	Print	Traditional B&W film	Belgium	135, 120	Nothing

=== Color negative film ===
Make	Name	Dates	Base	ISO	Process	Type	Details	Origin	Formats	Replaced by
Gevaert	Gevacolor N5	1950–?	T	25-40	Agfacolor	Print	General purpose color negative unmasked film balanced for daylight. Speed later increased to ASA 40.	Belgium	135-20, 120, 620	Nothing
Gevaert	Gevacolor N5 Mask	?–?	T	40	Agfacolor	Print	General purpose color negative masked film balanced for daylight.	Belgium	135-20, 120, 620, sheet film	Nothing
Gevaert	Gevacolor N3	?–?	T	16-20	Agfacolor	Print	Negative studio film balanced for artificial light. Unmasked. Speed later increased to ASA 20.	Belgium	sheet film	Nothing

=== Color reversal (slide) film ===
Make	Name	Dates	Base	ISO	Process	Type	Details	Origin	Formats	Replaced by
Gevaert	Gevacolor R5	?–?	T	12-50	Agfacolor	Slide	General purpose color reversal film balanced for daylight. Speed later increased to ASA 25 and then again to ASA 50.	Belgium	135-20, 120, 620	Nothing
Gevaert	Gevacolor R3	1948–1950s	T	12	Agfacolor	Slide	Reversal studio film balanced for artificial light. Most likely discontinued in the 50s.	Belgium	sheet film	Nothing

== Gigabit ==
- Type: Black and white
- Speed: ISO 40, DIN 17°
- Available formats: 35 mm
- Granularity: Extremely fine
- Resolving power: Extremely high
- History: said to be Agfa Copex micrography film, sold with special low-contrast developer to increase dynamic range
- Primary usage: General black-and-white photography, with scanning in mind
- General characteristics: PET base for better film flatness, strong contrast and low exposure tolerance, fine grain not much subject to grain aliasing in usual resolution scans
- Discontinued

== Herzog ==
Johannes Herzog & Co. was a German manufacturer of photographic materials: since 1988 dry plates ("Sonja EW"), B&W films (1901–1964), 1929 "Duxochrom" (sold in USA as "Colorstil“) and Roentgen X-ray films

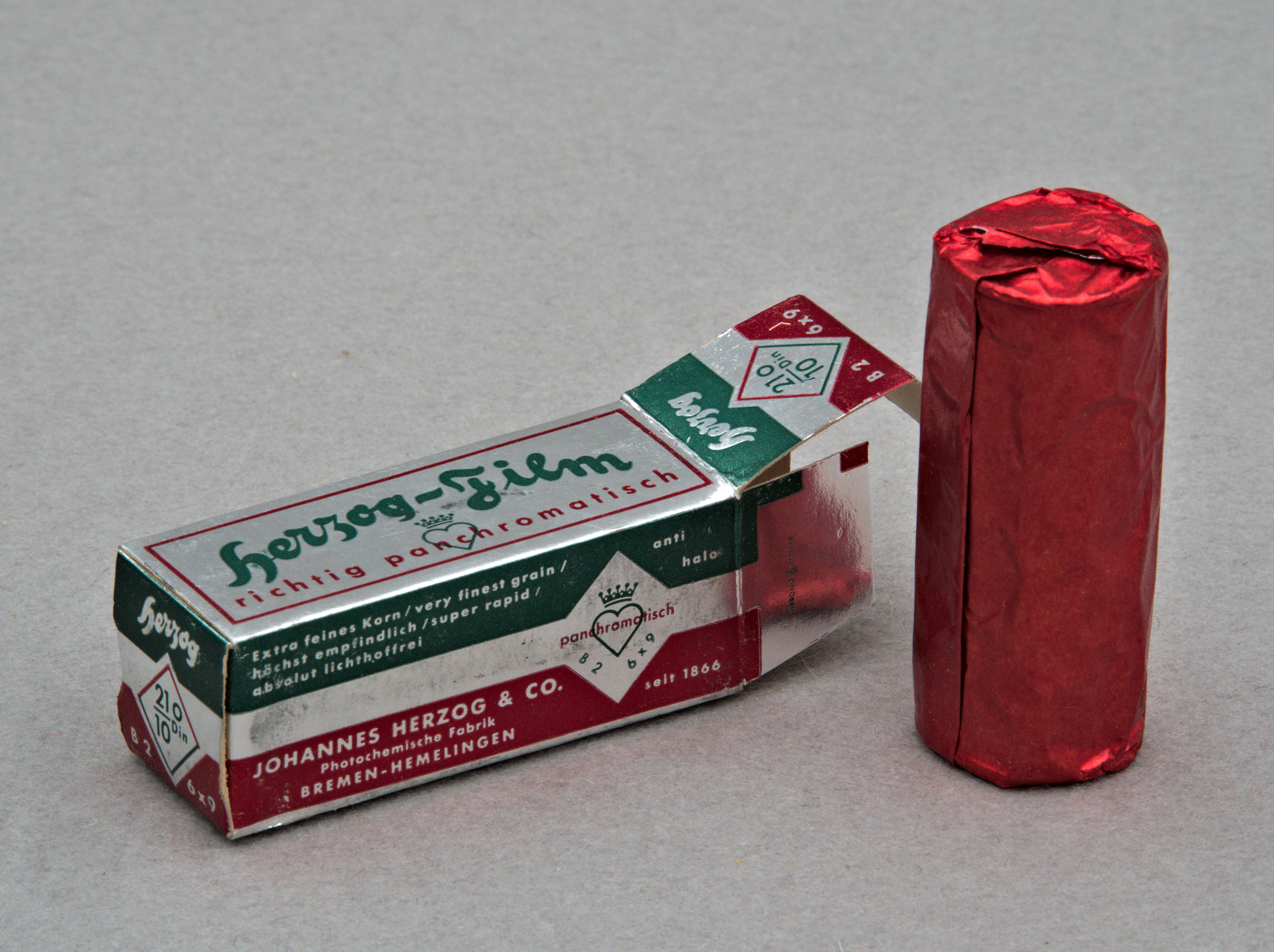
Herzog Film

== Ilford ==
Ilford is a UK manufacturer of photographic materials based in Mobberley, Cheshire known worldwide for its black and white films, papers and chemicals. Following bankruptcy in 2004 it was rescued in a management buy out and is now a brand of Harman Technology Ltd trading as Ilford Photo. Discontinued film versions include:

=== Black and white film ===
Make	Name	Dates	Base	ISO	Process	Type	Details	Origin	Formats	Replaced by
ILFORD	Selochrome	?–c1970	T	80/160	B&W	Print	General purpose panchromatic film for amateur use. Speed doubled after the new ASA standard was published in 1960.	UK	120	Nothing
ILFORD	Pan F	1948–1992	T	16/25/50	B&W	Print	Fine grain Panchromatic film. Speed increased to ASA 25 in 1956. Speed doubled after the new ASA standard was published in 1960.	UK	135	Pan F Plus
ILFORD	FP	1934–1939	?	40	B&W	Print	General purpose panchromatic film.	UK	?	FP2
ILFORD	FP2	1939–1942	?	40	B&W	Print	General purpose panchromatic film.	UK	?	FP3
ILFORD	FP3	1942–1968	T	64/125	B&W	Print	General purpose panchromatic film. Originally 64 ASA, changed to 125 ASA in 1960.	UK	135, 127, 120, 620, 116, 616, 828, sheet film	FP4
ILFORD	FP4	1968–1990	T	125	B&W	Print	General purpose panchromatic film.	UK	135, 120, 220, sheet film	FP4 Plus
ILFORD	HP	1935–1939	?	100	B&W	Print	High speed traditional panchromatic emulsion.	UK	?	HP2
ILFORD	HP2	1939–1941	?	100	B&W	Print	High speed traditional panchromatic film. This film was essentially the same as HP3. The difference in specified sensitivity reflects a safety factor that the manufacturer deemed necessary before general availability of exposure meters.	UK	?	HP3
ILFORD	HP3	1941–1969	T	200/400	B&W	Print	High speed traditional panchromatic film. Between 1965 and 1969 it appears that both HP3 and HP4 were available. Speed doubled after the new ASA standard was published in 1960.	UK	135, 127, 120, 620, 116, 616, sheet film	HP4
ILFORD	HP4	1965–1976	T	400	B&W	Print	High speed traditional panchromatic film.	UK	135, 120, sheet film	HP5
ILFORD	HP5	1976–1989 (?)	T	400	B&W	Print	High speed traditional panchromatic film. The discontinued date of this film was well into the late 1990s.	UK	135, 120, sheet film	HP5 Plus
ILFORD	HPS	1954–1998	T	400/800	B&W	Print	Very high speed traditional panchromatic film. Speed doubled after the new ASA standard was published in 1960.	UK	135, 120, sheet film	Ilford Delta 3200
ILFORD	Mark V	?–?	?	?	B&W	Print	Origin uncertain, possibly motion picture stock	UK	?	Nothing
ILFORD	XP1	1981–1993	T	400	C-41	Print	As a chromogenic film, XP1 it can be exposed with an exposure index from ISO 50/18° to 800/30° on a single roll and be developed in traditional C-41 processing.	UK	135, 120, sheet film	XP2
ILFORD	XP2	1991–1996	T	400	C-41	Print	As a chromogenic film, XP2 it can be exposed with an exposure index from ISO 50/18° to 800/30° on a single roll and be developed in traditional C-41 processing.	UK	135, 120, sheet film	XP2 Plus
ILFORD	XP2 Plus	1996–1998	T	400	C-41	Print	Improved version of XP2.	UK	135, 120, sheet film	XP2 Super

=== Color negative film ===
Make	Name	Dates	Base	ISO	Process	Type	Details	Origin	Formats	Replaced by
ILFORD	Ilfocolor	1960–1965	T	32	Ilford	Print	General purpose masked color negative film with universal color balance. Originally sold as "Ilfacolor". ASA 20 in tungsten light. Processing similar to Agfacolor.	UK	135, 127, 120, 620	Ilford Colorprint
ILFORD	Colorprint	1965–?	T	32	Ilford	Print	General purpose masked color negative film with universal light balance.	UK	135, Rapid	Nothing
ILFORD	Super Colorprint	1967–?	T	64	Ilford	Print	General purpose masked color negative film with universal light balance.	UK	135, 126, 127, 120	Nothing
ILFORD	Ilfocolor 100	c1983–c1984	T	100	C-41	Print	General purpose color negative film. Rebranded Konica Color SR.	UK, Japan	135	Ilfocolor HR 100
ILFORD	Ilfocolor 400	c1983–c1985	T	400	C-41	Print	General purpose color negative film. Rebranded Konica Color SR.	UK, Japan	135	Ilfocolor HR 400
ILFORD	Ilfocolor HR 100	1984–1988	T	100	C-41	Print	General purpose color negative. Initially repackaged Konica Color SR 100, later changed to Agfacolor XR.	UK, Japan, Germany	135	Super HR 100
ILFORD	Ilfocolor HR 200	1985–1988	T	200	C-41	Print	General purpose color negative, repackaged Agfacolor XR.	UK, Germany	135	Nothing
ILFORD	Ilfocolor HR Disc	c1985–?	T	200	C-41	Print	General purpose color negative film, manufactured by Konica according to Ilford specification.	UK, Japan	Disc	Nothing
ILFORD	Ilfocolor HR 400	1985–1988	T	400	C-41	Print	General purpose color negative, repackaged Agfacolor XR.	UK, Germany	135	Nothing
ILFORD	Ilfocolor Super HR	1985–1988	T	100	C-41	Print	General purpose color negative, repackaged Agfacolor XR.	UK, Germany	135	Nothing

=== Color reversal film ===
Make	Name	Dates	Base	ISO	Process	Type	Details	Origin	Formats	Replaced by
ILFORD	Colour Film D	1948–1960	T	10	Ilford	Slide	General purpose slide film for daylight.	UK	135	Ilfochrome
ILFORD	Colour Film A	1949–c1956	T	10	Ilford	Slide	General purpose slide film for artificial light.	UK	135	Ilford Colour Film F
ILFORD	Colour Film F	1956–1960	T	20	Ilford	Slide	General purpose slide film for clear flash bulbs.	UK	135	Nothing
ILFORD	Ilfochrome	1960–1965	T	32	Ilford	Slide	General purpose slide film for daylight. Originally sold as "Ilfachrome".	UK	135	Ilford Colour Slide
ILFORD	Colorslide	1965–?	T	32	Ilford	Slide	General purpose slide film for daylight.	UK	135, Rapid	Nothing
ILFORD	Super Colorslide	1965–?	T	64	Ilford	Slide	General purpose slide film for daylight.	UK	135, Rapid	Nothing
ILFORD	Ilfochrome 100	1982–1985	T	100	E-4	Slide	General purpose color reversal film, rebranded Sakurachrome R100 from Konica.	UK, Japan	135	Ilfochrome 100 (E-6)
ILFORD	Ilfochrome 50	1985–1988	T	50	E-6	Slide	General purpose color reversal film, repackaged Agfachrome stock.	UK, Germany	135	Nothing
ILFORD	Ilfochrome 100	1985–1988	T	100	E-6	Slide	General purpose color reversal film, rebranded Agfachrome stock.	UK, Germany	135	Nothing
ILFORD	Ilfochrome 200	1985–1988	T	200	E-6	Slide	General purpose color reversal film, repackaged Agfachrome stock.	UK, Germany	135	Nothing
ILFORD	Ilfochrome 1000	1985–1988	T	1000	E-6	Slide	General purpose color reversal film, repackaged Agfachrome stock.	UK, Germany	135	Nothing

== Kodak ==
Eastman Kodak was founded in 1888. During most of the 20th century, Kodak held a dominant position in photographic film. However Kodak struggled to manage the transition to digital photography and filed for Chapter 11 bankruptcy in 2012. Whilst Kodak films for still cameras continue to be manufactured by Eastman Kodak in Rochester, New York, US since its Chapter 11 bankruptcy they are now sold and marketed by Kodak Alaris, a separate company controlled by the Kodak UK Pension fund based in Hertfordshire, UK.

See web page taphilo.com for a list of Kodak film number to film type.

=== Black and white film ===
Discontinued Kodak black and white films
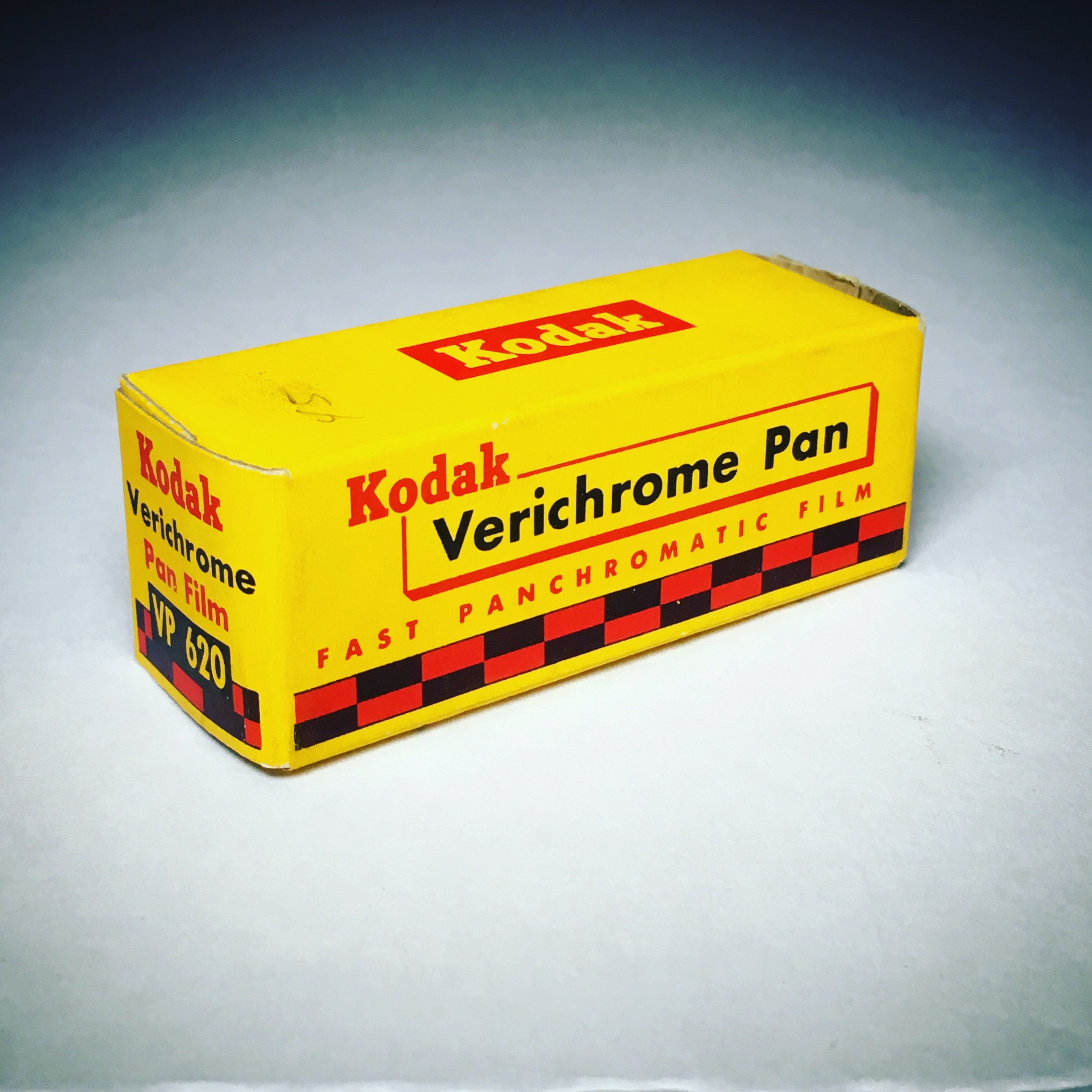
Kodak Verichrome Pan 620 Fast Panchromatic Film (Expired July 1957)

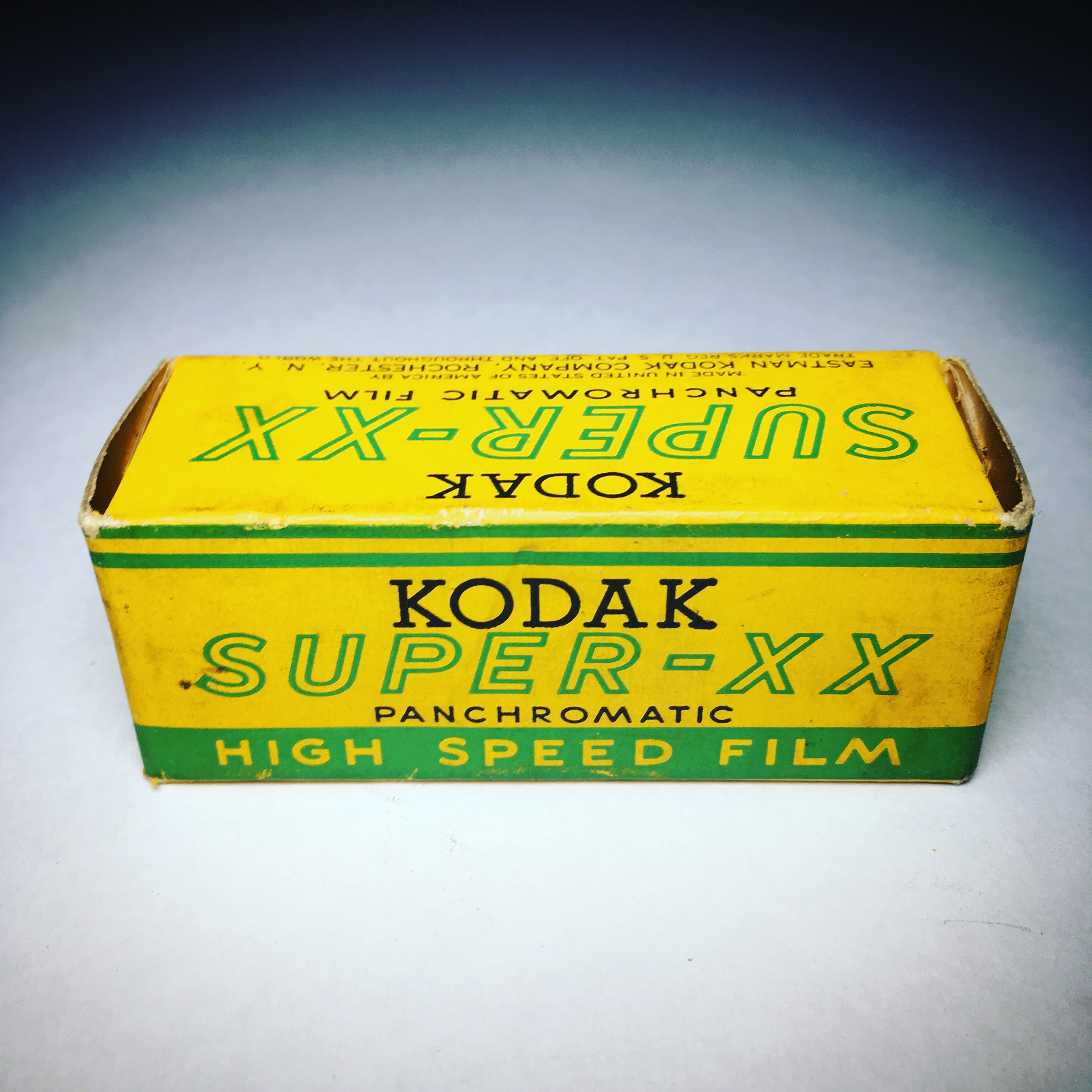
Kodak Super-XX Panchromatic High Speed 120 Film (Expired December 1939)

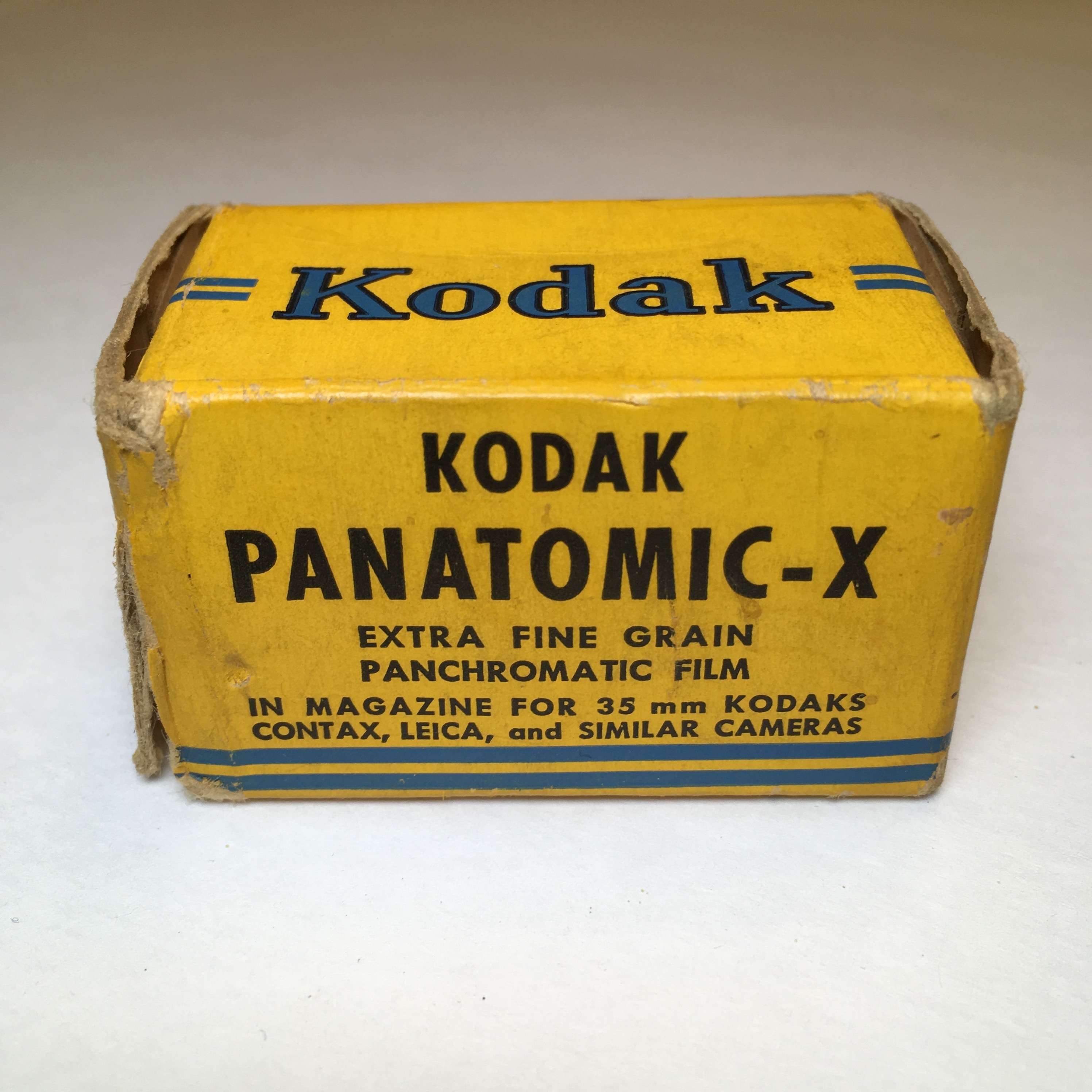
Kodak Panatomic-X 35mm Film (Expire July 1944)

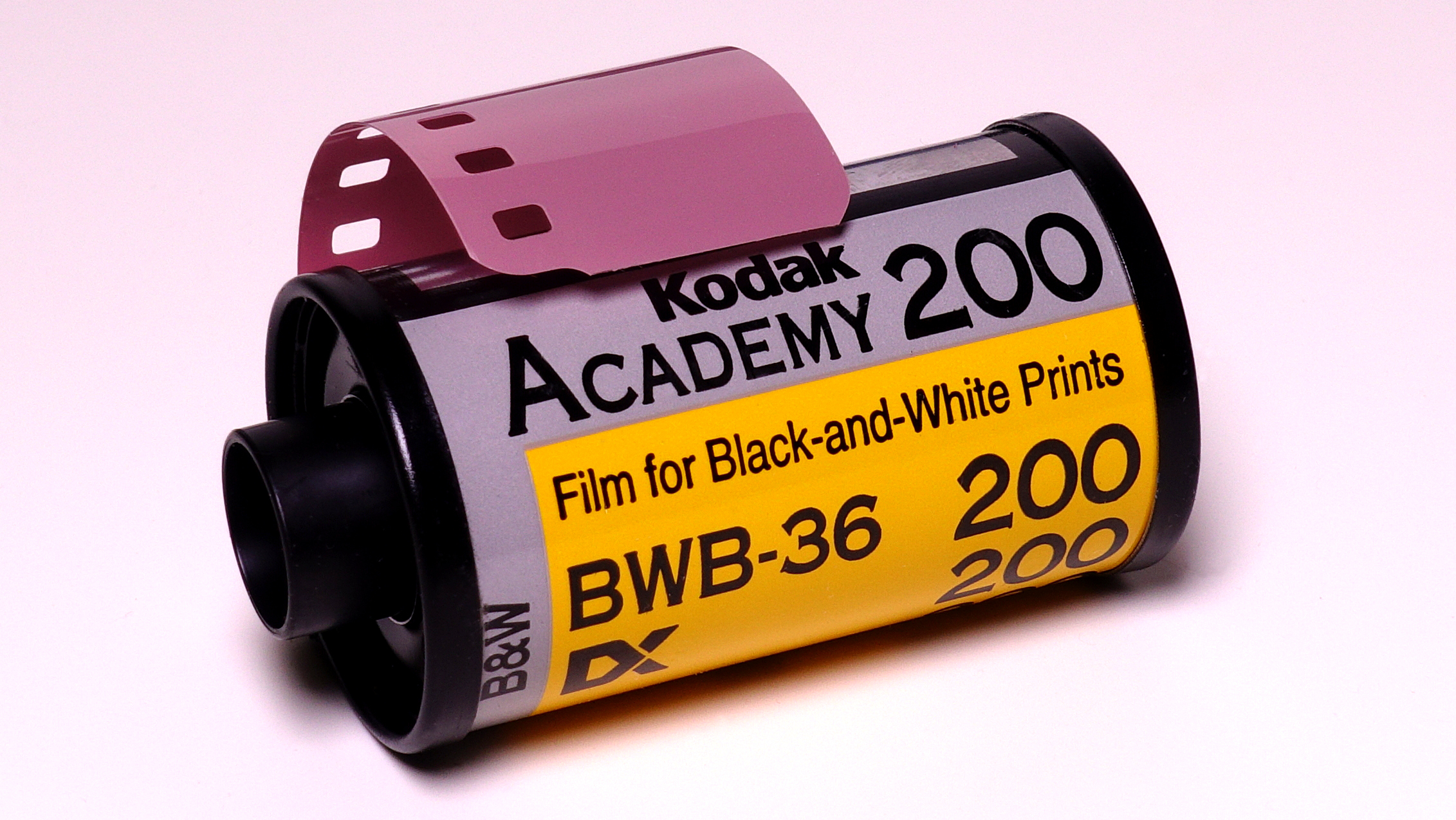
Kodak Academy 200

Make	Name	Dates	Base	ISO	Process	Type	Details	Origin	Formats	Replaced by
Kodak	Verichrome Safety Film	1931–1956	T	?	B&W	Print	Orthochromatic B&W film. Wratten & Wainwright Verichrome was introduced around 1907/8 offering greater spectral sensitivity and speed compared to contemporary emulsions of the time. The company was bought by Kodak in 1912. In 1931 Kodak released the film on a safety base as a roll film, with greater latitude and finer grain than the Kodak NC (Non-Curling) Film that had been the standard since 1903. Replaced by Kodak Verichrome Pan (Panchromatic) film in 1956. (V)	US	116, 118, 120, 122, 124, 127, 130, 616, 620	Kodak Verichrome Pan
Kodak	Panatomic-X	1933–1940s,1956-1987	T	32/40	B&W	Print	Very fine grain general purpose film. Speed: 32 ASA (Kodak Publication No. R-20, 3rd Edition, 1967), 40 ASA/17° DIN (Kodak publication FF1062, 1965), 40 ASA (Kodak Publication No. F-13, 2nd Edition, 1965). (FX)	US	120, 127, 135, 828	TMAX 100
Kodak	Super-XX	1940–1992	T	200	B&W	Print	Kodak's standard high-speed film from 1940 to 1954, when Tri-X was introduced in smaller formats. Discontinued before 1960 in roll-film formats, but sheet film was available until 1992. Originally 100, later ASA 200 when safety factor was reduced in 1960. Relatively coarse grain. Very long, almost perfectly straight-line characteristic curve, great latitude made it ideal for variable developments, both longer and shorter, water-bath development, special compensating formulas. (XX)	US	Sheet film, 116, 118, 120, 122, 127, 130, 616, 620	Tri-X
Kodak	Royal Pan	1954–?	?	400	B&W	Print	Professional sheet film for studio work based on a special film for coronation of Elizabeth II in 1953 (Flash photography was banned in Westminster Abbey). High speed, moderate contrast, moderate grain. EI 200 for daylight, EI 160 for artificial light before the update of ASA standard.	US	Sheet film	Nothing
Kodak	Plus-X Pan	1954–2011	T	125	B&W	Print	Plus-X Pan (PX) and Plus-X Pan Professional (PXP) films are general purpose medium-speed panchromatic films for outdoor or studio photography with extremely fine grain and excellent sharpness. (Originally ASA 50 later ASA 125). PX in 135 format and PXP 120, 220 formats with a retouching surface on the emulsion side.	US	135, 120, 220	Nothing
Kodak	Verichrome Pan	1956–2002	T	80/125	B&W	Print	General purpose medium-speed (EI 125) panchromatic film that features extremely fine grain with excellent gradation and wide exposure latitude. (Early 620: EI 80 Daylight, 60 Tungsten). This film has characteristics similar to those of Kodak Plus-X Pan Professional Film, but does not have retouching surfaces. Also 8" x 5 feet format for Cirkut cameras. 122 discontinued in 1971, 116 and 616 discontinued in 1984. (VP)	US	116, 616, 120, 620, 122, 126, 127, 828	Nothing
Kodak	Royal-X Pan	1956–c1987	T	1250	B&W	Print	Royal-X Pan (RX) is ultra high-speed print film for low light situations that had coarse grain. Due to its coarse-grain it was only sold as medium format and large format film.	US	120, 620, sheet film	Nothing
Kodak	Ektapan	?–2002	T	100	B&W	Print	Very Fine grain film for portraiture and close-up work with electronic flash, and for commercial, industrial, and scientific applications. Formats: 4"x5", 5"x7", 8"x10", and 11"x14" sheets, long rolls	US	Sheet film	Nothing
Kodak	Technical Pan	c1984–2004	T/P	25	B&W	Print	An ultra-high definition high-contrast microfilm emulsion that was made panchromatic through the addition of sensitizing dyes. Special developer is needed to tame the extreme contrast for use in pictorial photography. Type 2415 in 135 and 4-inch x 5-inch sizes with 4-mil (P) base with light piping suppressing layer and 6415 Film in 120 size with a 3.6-mil (T) base. (TP)	US	135, 120, 4"x5"	Nothing
Kodak	Academy 200 / Panchromatic 200	?–2000	T	400	B&W	Print	Low cost wide latitude black and white film marketed in Europe, Asia and India. Coarse grained and low resolution film reminiscent of Super-XX. Very tolerant of processing variations allowing contrast adjustment by altering development times. "Kodak Panchromatic 200" in the Philippines from c1995–2000.	US	135	Nothing
Kodak	High Speed Infrared	?–2007	P	80	B&W	Print	Infrared sensitive high-speed film with moderately high contrast, sensitive to light and radiant energy to 900 nanometres (nm). It is useful for haze penetration and for special effects in commercial, architectural, fine art, and landscape photography. EI 80 (daylight) 200 (tungsten). (HIE)	US	135, 120, 220, sheet film	Nothing
Kodak	Portra 400BW	c2001–?	T	400	C-41	Print	Professional chromogenic B&W film with exposure latitude from EI 50 to EI 1600. (400BW)	US	135-36, 120, 220	T400CN
Kodak	T400CN	?–2004	T/P	400	C-41	Print	General purpose C-41 process chromogenic B&W film with wide exposure latitude.	US	135, 120, 220, 4x5"	BW400CN
Kodak	BW400CN	2004–2014	T	400	C-41	Print	General purpose C-41 process chromogenic B&W film with wide exposure latitude. Competitor to Ilford XP2 Super.	US	135, 120, 220	Nothing
Kodak	Eastman Orthochromatic Aero Film	WWI			B&W	Print	1st Kodak aerial film			
Kodak	Eastman Panchromatic Aero Film	WWI			B&W	Print	1st Kodak aerial film			

=== Color negative film ===
Make	Name	Dates	Base	ISO	Process	Type	Details	Origin	Formats	Replaced by
Consumer films
Kodak	Kodacolor	1942–1963	T	25/32	C-22	Print	General purpose consumer color film. Initially processing was included, but following antitrust legislation in 1950s, independent processing using C-22 process became available. Type A (suffix), indicated balanced for 3400K photolamps. 135 format added from 1958. (C)	US	116, 616, 120, 620, 127, 135	Kodacolor-X
Kodak	Kodacolor-X	1963–1975	T	64/80	C-22	Print	General purpose consumer color film. It was introduced along with the Kodak Instamatic cameras which use 126 film. Initially 64 ISO later increased to 80 ISO. (CX)	US	116, 616, 120, 620, 126, 127, 135, 828	Kodacolor II
Kodak	Kodacolor II	1972–1983	T	80/100	C-41	Print	First general purpose consumer color film, using new C-41 process. Introduced with launch of the new 110 film cartridge. Initially 80 ISO, increased to 100 ISO from 1975. (C)	US	110, 116, 616, 120, 620, 126, 127, 135, 828	Kodacolor VR 100
Kodak	Kodacolor 400	1977–1983	T	400	C-41	Print	High speed general purpose consumer color film, 120 from 1978. (CG)	US	110, 135, 120	Kodacolor VR 400
Kodak	Kodacolor HR	1982–1983	T	200?	C-41	Print	General purpose consumer color film for disc cameras. It was Kodak's first color negative film to use their T-Grain technology and improved cyan coupler. Quickly replaced with VR series for all film types. (CHR)	US	Disc	Kodacolor VR 200
Kodak	Kodacolor VR 100	1982–1986	T	100	C-41	Print	General purpose consumer color film. Emulsion re-introduced in 1990 as 'Kodacolor 100' budget film in 135 format (not us market) (CP)	US	135, 120	Kodacolor VR-G 100
Kodak	Kodacolor VR 200	1982–1986	T	200	C-41	Print	General purpose consumer color film. Emulsion re-introduced in 1990 as 'Kodacolor 200' budget film (not us market), later improved version (VR-G?) ColorPlus (CL)	US	110, 135, 120, 620, 126, 127, Disc	Kodacolor VR-G 200
Kodak	Kodacolor VR 400	1982–1988	T	400	C-41	Print	General purpose consumer color film. 110, 135 discontinued in 1986.(CM)	US	110, 135, 120	Kodacolor VR-G 400
Kodak	Kodacolor VR 1000	1983–1989	T	1000	C-41	Print	Very high speed general purpose consumer color film, possible due to new T-Grain technology introduced with HR Disc films.	US	135	Kodacolor Gold 1600
Kodak	Kodacolor VR-G 100	1987–1988	T	100	C-41	Print	General purpose consumer color film. First generation 'gold' film. (CA)	US	135, 120	Kodacolor Gold 100
Kodak	Kodacolor VR-G 200	1987–1988	T	200	C-41	Print	General purpose consumer color film. First generation 'gold' film. (CB)	US	110, 135, 120, 620, 126, 127	Kodacolor Gold 200
Kodak	Kodacolor VR-G 400	1987–1988	T	400	C-41	Print	General purpose consumer color film. First generation 'gold' film. (CC)	US	135, 120	Kodacolor Gold 400
Kodak	Kodacolor Gold 100	1988–1997	T	100	C-41	Print	General purpose consumer color film. Only 120 format Gold film. (GA)	US	135, 120	Kodak Gold 100
Kodak	Kodacolor Gold 200	1988–1997	T	200	C-41	Print	General purpose consumer color film (GB). 620 and 127 discontinued in 1995.	US	110, 135, 120, 620, 126, 127	Kodak Gold 200
Kodak	Kodacolor Gold 400	1988–1997	T	400	C-41	Print	General purpose consumer color film. (GC)	US	135, 120	Kodak Gold 400
Kodak	Kodacolor Gold 1600	?– ?	T	1600	C-41	Print	General purpose ultra high speed color film. (GF)	US	135	Nothing
Kodak	Gold 100	c1997–2007	T	100	C-41	Print	Kodak Gold 100-3 released in 1992; Kodak Gold 100-4 released in 1994; Kodak Gold 100-5 released in 1995; Kodak Gold 100-6 released in 1997. (GA)	US	135	Nothing
Kodak	Gold 200	c1997– ?	T	200	C-41	Print	General purpose color film. 110 format discontinued in the late 90s/early 00s. 135 format still manufactured today. (GB)	US	110	Nothing
Kodak	Gold 400	c1997–c2002	T	400	C-41	Print	General purpose high speed color film. Later sold as Gold Ultra 400. (GC)	US	110, 135	Kodak Max 400
Kodak	Gold Max (Gold 800)	c1997–c2002	T	800	C-41	Print	General purpose high speed color film. (GT)	US	135	Kodak Max Zoom 800
Kodak	Max 400	c2002–2007	T	400	C-41	Print	Next generation of Gold films, replacing Kodak Gold 400. (GC)	US	135	Kodak UltraMax 400
Kodak	Max Zoom 800	c2002–2007	T	800	C-41	Print	Next generation of Gold films, replacing Kodak Gold 800. (GT)	US	135	Kodak UltraMax 800
Kodak	Ektar 25	1989–1997	T	25	C-41	Print	Professional-grade color film launched at Photokina in 1988 with ultra fine grain, intended to provide the enhanced color saturation and high acutance associated with color slide emulsions. 135 format discontinued in 1994 and renamed Royal Gold. (CK)	US	135, 120	Royal Gold 25
Kodak	Ektar 125	1989–1991	T	125	C-41	Print	Professional-grade color film with ultra fine grain. The 125 ISO was a poor seller and replaced by a 100 ISO film. (CW)	US	135, 120	Ektar 100 (1991)
Kodak	Ektar 1000	1989–1997	T	1000	C-41	Print	Professional-grade color film with ultra fine grain. 135 format discontinued in 1994. (CJ)	US	135, 120	Royal Gold 1000
Kodak	Ektar 100	1991–1997	T	100	C-41	Print	Professional-grade color film with ultra fine grain. 135 format discontinued in 1994 and renamed Royal Gold. (CX)	US	135, 120	Royal Gold 100
Kodak	Royal Gold 25	1996– ?	T	25	C-41	Print	Color film with ultra fine grain and high color saturation. Replaced original Ektar films. (RZ)	US	135	Nothing
Kodak	Royal Gold 100	1996–c2002	T	100	C-41	Print	Color film with ultra fine grain and high color saturation. Replaced original Ektar films. (RA)	US	135	Nothing
Kodak	Royal Gold 200	1996–c2004	T	200	C-41	Print	Color film with ultra fine grain and high color saturation. Replaced original Ektar films. (RB)	US	135	Kodak High Definition 200
Kodak	Royal Gold 400	1996–c2004	T	400	C-41	Print	Color film with ultra fine grain and high color saturation. Replaced original Ektar films. (RC)	US	135	Kodak High Definition 400
Kodak	Royal Gold 1000	1998–c2004	T	1000	C-41	Print	Color film with ultra fine grain and high color saturation. Replaced original Ektar films. (RF)	US	135	Nothing
Kodak	High Definition 200	2003– ?	T	200	C-41	Print	Ultra fine grain film with great color reproduction. Replaced Royal Gold. Sold as Royal Supra 200 outside of the US. (HD2)	US	135	Nothing
Kodak	High Definition 400	c2003– ?	T	400	C-41	Print	Ultra fine grain film with great color reproduction. Replaced Royal Gold. Sold as Royal Supra 400 outside of the US. (HD4)	US	135	Nothing
Professional films
Kodak	Supra 100	?–c2003	T/P?	100	C-41	Print	Professional color film.	US	135	Portra 160VC
Kodak	Supra 400	?–c2003	T?	400	C-41	Print	Professional color film.	US	135	Portra 400UC
Kodak	Supra 800	?–c2003	T	800	C-41	Print	Professional color film.	US	135	Portra 800
Kodak	Portra 100T	?–2006	T/P	100	C-41	Print	Professional color film, 'Tungsten' for outstanding color accuracy under tungsten lightning (3200K). Improved long exposure performance. Suitable for advertising and architecture photography and art reproduction. (100T)	US	135, 120, sheet film	None
Kodak	Portra 160NC	1998–2011	T/P	160	C-41	Print	Professional color film, 'Natural Color' for subtle color and natural skin tones in controlled lighting situations. (160NC)	US	135, 120, 220, Sheet film	Portra 160
Kodak	Portra 160VC	1998–2011	T/P	160	C-41	Print	Professional color film, 'Vivid Color' for vibrant color and slightly higher contrast in controlled lighting situations. (160VC)	US	135, 120, 220, Sheet film	Portra 160
Kodak	Portra 400NC	1998–2010	T/P	400	C-41	Print	Professional color film, 'Natural Color' for subtle color and natural skin tones in low light or with flash. (400NC)	US	135, 120, 220, Sheet film	Portra 400
Kodak	Portra 400VC	1998–2010	T	400	C-41	Print	Professional color film, 'Vivid Color' for vibrant color and slightly higher contrast to add snap to flat/overcast light. (400VC)	US	135, 120, 220	Portra 400
Kodak	Portra 400UC	?–c2004	T	400	C-41	Print	Professional color film, 'Ultra Color' for highly saturated images. (400UC)	US	135, 120, 220	Ultra Color 400
Kodak	Ultra Color 100UC	2004–?	T	100	C-41	Print	New film for fashion, advertising, editorial, commercial, travel, and nature photography.	US	135, 120, 220	Nothing
Kodak	Ultra Color 400UC	2004–?	T	400	C-41	Print	Rebranded Portra 400UC.	US	135, 120, 220	Nothing

=== Color reversal (slide) film ===
Discontinued Kodak reversal (slide) film
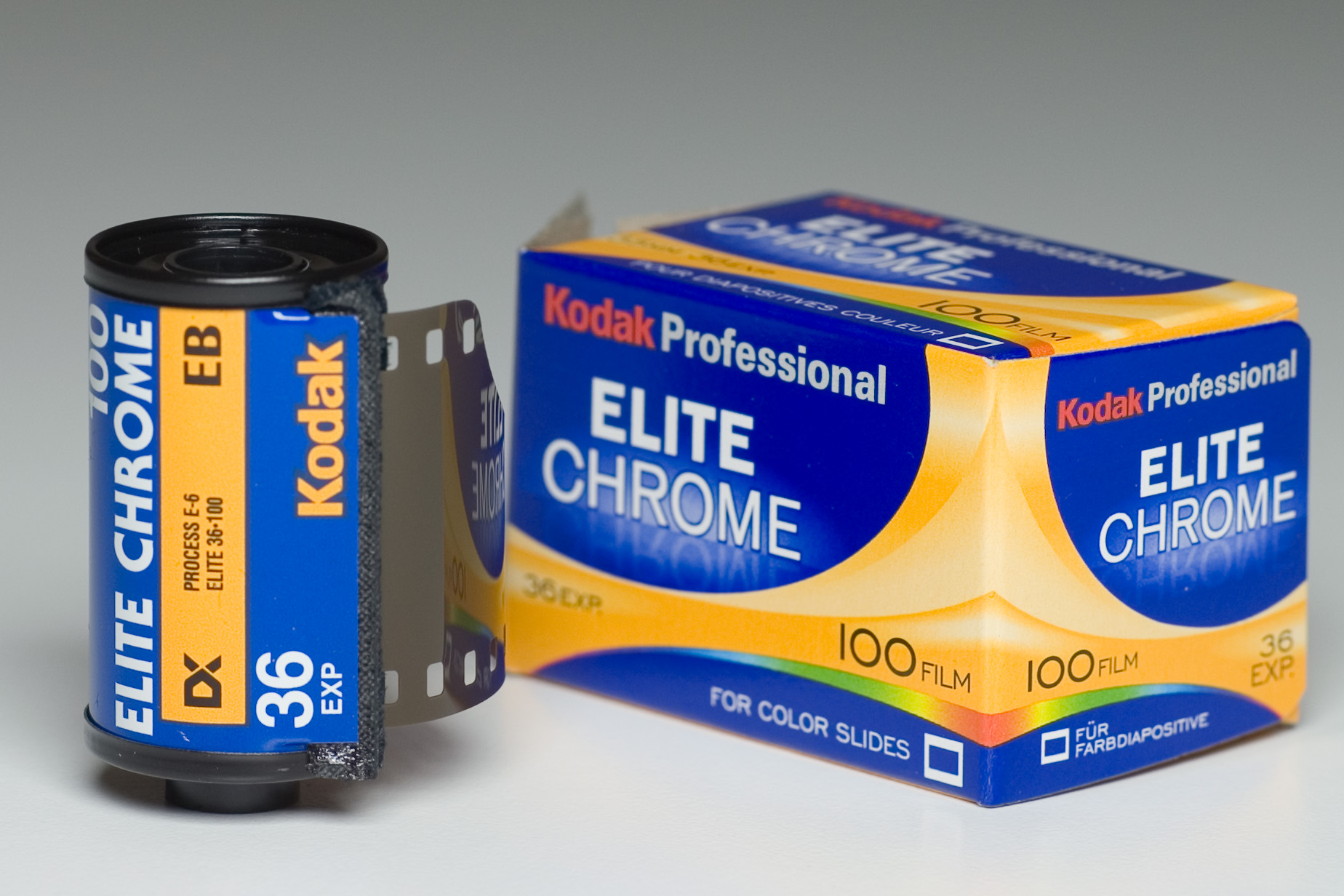
Kodak Elite Chrome 100

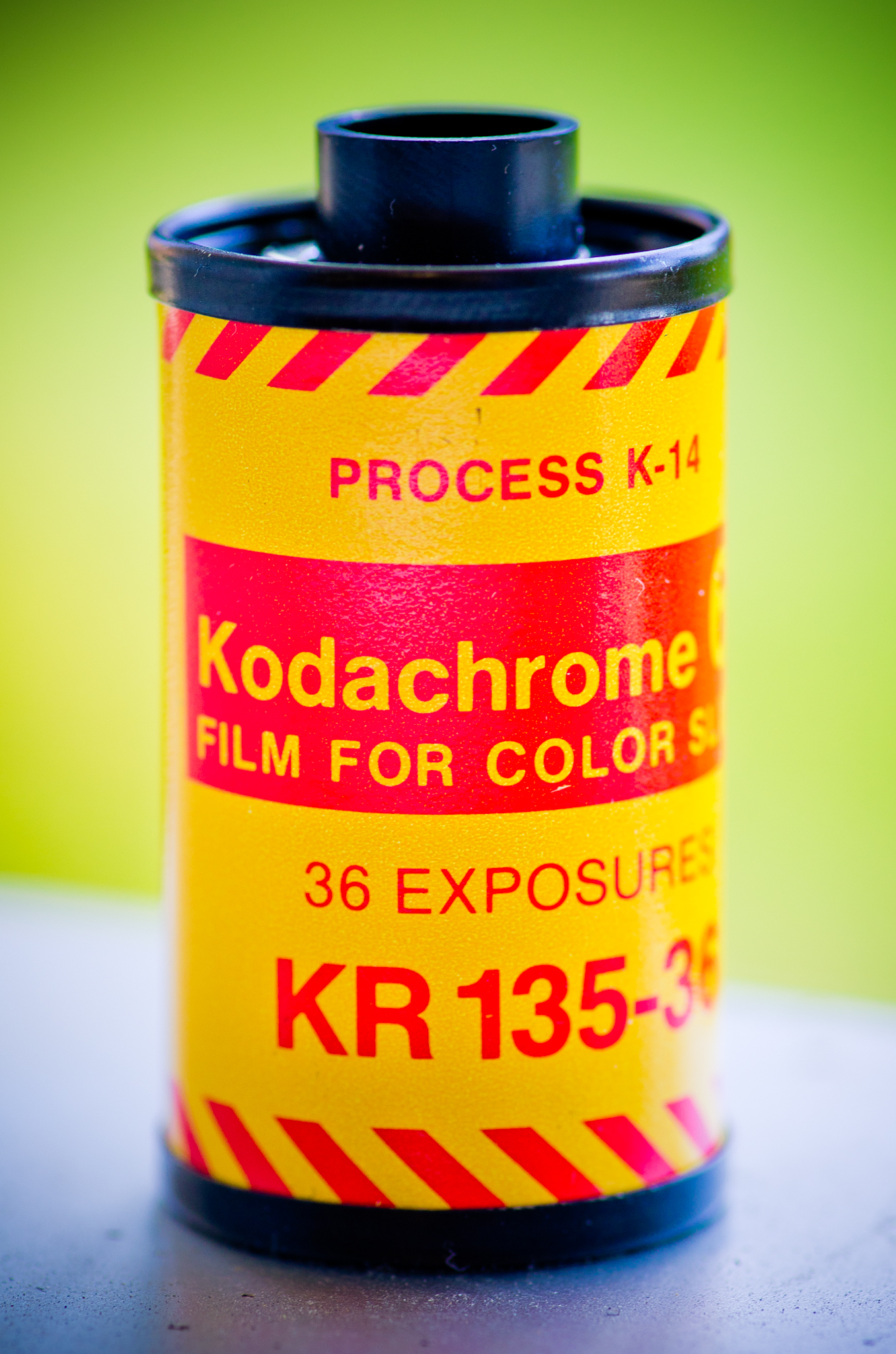
Kodachrome 64

Make	Name	Dates	Base	ISO	Process	Type	Details	Origin	Formats	Replaced by
Kodak	Kodachrome	1936–1962	T	10/16	Kodak	Slide	First color film that used a subtractive color method to be successfully mass-marketed. Launched 1935 for motion picture film, 1936 for still cameras. Special development process required, with multiple dyeing steps as each color layer was processed separately, because there were no dye-couplers in film, unlike the contemporary Agfa Color Neu (where color couplers enabled all three layers processed together). This resulted in good color longevity as developed Kodachrome does not retain unused color couplers. However it required more complex processing. Available in daylight (ISO 10) and Type A (ISO 16).	US	135, 828	Kodachrome (1955)
Kodak	Kodachrome Professional	1938–1951	T	8/10	Kodak	Slide	Professional Daylight (ISO 8) and Type A film (ISO 10) for 3400^{0} K photofloods	US	Sheet film	Nothing
Kodak	Kodachrome	1955–1962	T	12	K-11	Slide	Daylight color slide film (ISO 12)	US	135, 828.	Kodachrome II
Kodak	Kodachrome Professional	1956–1962	T	16	K-11	Slide	Professional Type A film (ISO 16)	US	135	Kodachrome II
Kodak	Kodachrome II	1961–1974	T	25	K-12	Slide	Daylight color slide film.	US	135, 828.	Kodachrome 25
Kodak	Kodachrome II Professional	1962–1978	T	40	K-12	Slide	Type A professional color slide film	US	135	Kodachrome 40
Kodak	Kodachrome-X	1962–1974	T	64	K-12	Slide	Daylight color slide film. Launched with 135 format, 126 was added in 1963 and 110 in 1972	US	110, 126, 135	Kodachrome 64
Kodak	Ektachrome E200	?–2011	T	200	E-6	Slide	Ektachrome—general purpose daylight-balanced color transparency film with moderate contrast and the "look" of a lower speed film. Push-processing capable to an E.I. of 800. 'T' Grain emulsion. Discontinued March 2011	US	135, 120, 220	Ektachrome E100G
Kodak	Professional Elite Chrome 100	1989–2012	T	100	E-6	Slide	General purpose daylight-balanced color transparency film with natural colors including skin tones, colors, and neutrals. Uses Kodak's color amplifying and T-grain technology (EB).	US	135	Nothing
Kodak	Professional Elite Chrome Extra Color 100	1991–2012	T	100	E-6	Slide	Daylight-balanced color transparency film featuring the highest color saturation available in a 100-speed consumer slide film, delivering extra bright colors particularly for nature and scenic photos (EBX)	US	135	Nothing
Kodak	Ektachrome 64T	?–2012	T	64	E-6	Slide	Tungsten balanced fine grain color transparency film, for commercial photography for catalogs, room interiors, furniture and architectural subjects. (EPY)	US	135, 120, Sheet film	Nothing
Kodak	Ektachrome 100 Plus	2001–2009	T	100	E-6	Slide	Daylight balanced fine grain color transparency film (EPP).	US	135, 120, 220	Ektachrome E100G
Kodak	Ektachrome E100G	2000–2012	T/P	100	E-6	Slide	Daylight balanced fine grain color transparency film with moderately enhanced color saturation and a neutral color balance, for commercial advertising, fashion, editorial, architecture, nature/wildlife photography. Uses Kodak's Color Amplifying and T-GRAIN Emulsion technology. Sheet film 4"x5", 8"x10" 'P' base.	US	135, 120, 220, Sheet film	Ektachrome E100
Kodak	Ektachrome E100GX	2001–2009	T	100	E-6	Slide	Daylight balanced fine grain color transparency film with moderately enhanced color saturation and a warm color balance (compared to neutral color for E100G), for commercial advertising, fashion, editorial, architecture, nature/wildlife photography. Uses Kodak's Color Amplifying and T-grain technology.	US	135, 120, 220	Ektachrome E100G
Kodak	Ektachrome E100VS	2002–2012	T	100	E-6	Slide	Daylight balanced fine grain color transparency film with vivid saturated colors (VS) while maintaining a neutral gray scale. Intended for commercial location and studio shooting of nature, food, jewelry, and subjects that call for brilliant, dramatic hues. Uses Kodak's Color Amplifying and T-grain technology. (E100VS) Sheet film 4x5", 8x10" 'P' base	US	135, 120, 220, sheet film	Nothing
Kodak	Ektachrome Professional Infrared EIR Film	?–2009	P	200	E-6	Slide	Infrared sensitive false color reversal film for IR photographic applications e.g. artistic, industrial, scientific, and aerial or technical ground photography. The extent infrared reflectance affects the final color rendition. E.I 200 (daylight), 100 (tungsten). (EIR)	US	135-36	Nothing
Kodak	Kodak Aerial RA Aerographic Duplicating Film (7-mil) - Code : 4425	~2000s ?	Nothing	Nothing	Nothing	Remplaced by 4416	Nothing	Nothing	Nothing	
Kodak	Kodak Aero Positive Transparency	1946-1949				Slide				
Kodak	Kodak Aerochrome Color Infrared B158 (ESTAR Thin base) - Code : 3443	1976	P			Slide	2443 on a thin base, EA-5 chem, clear gel backing			
Kodak	Kodak AEROCHROME Duplicating (ESTAR Base) - Code : 2447		P							
Kodak	Kodak Aerochrome II Duplicating Film, SP883, 70mm, process EA-5. - Code : 2447									
Kodak	Kodak Aerochrome III Infrared ESTAR Base - Code : 1443	80s?–2009	P			Slide	35mm & Large bulk format. AR-5 process			
Kodak	Kodak AEROCHROME III MS ESTAR Base – Code 2427	~ 1971	P			Slide	Process AR-5, positive color transparencies			
Kodak	Kodak AEROCHROME Infrared (ESTAR Base) - Code : 2443	~ 1971	P			Slide	False color IR reversal film for forest surveys and camouflage detection			
Kodak	Kodak Aerochrome IR - Code : 2443 - EA-5					Slide	70mm and 5 inch formats, process EA-5			
Kodak	Kodak Aerochrome IR Infrared - Code : 1443					Slide	Replace 2443			
Kodak	Kodak Aerochrome MS Aerographic ESTAR Base - Code : 2448	1967	P			Slide	Color reversal (EA-5) but could be run through C-22. Same film as Ektachrome MS Aero ? (same code)			
Kodak	Kodak EKTACHROME infrared Aero EA-4 - Code : 8443 EIR	1959 ?				Slide	Bulk 70mm to 9.5 inch wide formats			
Kodak	Kodak EKTACHROME Professional Infrared EIR Film (Kodak 2236?) TI-2323 - (Code DX: 000990)	1997-2012				Slide	Kodak Aerochrome III 1443 ? Manuf Eastman Kodak	Made in USA		
Kodak	Kodak (Ektachrome or Cadmium enriched?) - Code : E3443					Slide	Aerochrome 2443 on a thin base			
Kodak	Kodak Aerial Ektachrome military film	~1941				Slide	Governmental, scientific and military use only. 1St Ektachrome			
Kodak	Kodak EASTMAN H5224 Infrared Aerographic - Code : H-5224		P			Slide	Military infrared Hi-speed			
Kodak	Kodak EKTACHROME Infrared - Code : 0201 IE	~80s ?- Mid 90s ?				Slide	Ancestor of EIR. E-6 Process ?			

=== Kodachrome 25, 64, and 200 Professional ===
Kodachrome was the first practical color reversal film; essentially first commercially-important color film of any kind. It featured extremely fine grain, high saturation, and extremely high sharpness. Kodachrome entered American popular culture with a 1973 song by Paul Simon, as well as a 2017 Hollywood movie.

- Kodachrome was launched as a 16mm movie film in 1935, with a film speed of ISO 10. The first stills version was released the following year.
- Kodachrome II was introduced in 1961; this was available in daylight balanced speeds of ISO 25 and ISO 64, later rebranded as Kodachrome 25 and Kodachrome 64. Kodachrome 25 ceased production in 2001.
- Kodachrome Type F (for flash; stopped being made in 1950s).
- Kodachrome 200 was introduced in November 1986 and sold through 2007.
- Later Kodachrome Professional 64 and 200 were added.
- Processing purchased with film until Justice Department sued around 1954, claiming this was a monopolistic practice. There were relatively few competitors however, with the complex developing machinery necessary.
- At various times Kodachrome was produced in 126, 120, and 110 stills formats, as well as various movie and cine film formats.
- Also available in larger roll film formats and sheet film (until late 1940s, beginning of 1950s).
- The entire Kodachrome emulsion line was discontinued in 2009. The last processor in the world closed down its Kodachrome line at end of 2010.
- Suggested Replacement: Kodak Ektachrome E100d

==== Ektachrome Lumiere 100 ====
- Professional Film
- Code LPP 6146
- Launch Date: ?
- Discontinued: ?
- Suggested Replacement: ?
- Type: Medium speed color reversal film providing neutral color balance with enhanced color saturation.
- Speed: Temp/EI/Wratten filter no. (Source: Ektachrome Lumiere 100 Data Sht dtd 11–93)
1. 5500K/100/none
2. 3200K/25/80A
3. 3400K/32/80B
- Processing: E-6
- Formats: 135, 120, cut film.
- Kodak Pub No. E-137, "Kodak Ektachrome Lumiere 100 Professional Film"
- Note: A number of photographers noted this film was too cool under some circumstances.
- EKTACHROME 64 Professional Film
- EKTACHROME 100 Professional Film
- EKTACHROME 100 Plus Professional Film
- EKTACHROME 160T Professional Film
- EKTACHROME 320T Professional Film
- EKTACHROME P1600 Professional Film
- EKTACHROME 400X Professional Film
- Ektachrome E100S
- Ektachrome E100D

== Konica ==
Established 1873 in Japan, Konishiroku (Konica) was a major producer of color film, cameras and related products, including film development processors and printing technology. Originally Konica film and paper was sold under the brand name of "Sakura" meaning Cherry Blossom in English. Along with 3M Ferrania they were a significant producer of 'white label' consumer color films for both retailers and traditional B&W film producers needing a color film to repackage under their own brand. Only in later years did they make significant efforts to market film under the Konica brand. In 2003, Konica merged with Minolta to form Konica Minolta. In 2006, the merged company closed down its photo imaging division, which produced color film, color paper, photo chemicals and digital minilab machines (at the time it was the 3rd largest film producer behind Kodak and Fujifilm, Agfa-Gevaert having collapsed a year earlier). The company produced the following films:

=== Black and white film ===
- Sakura Panchro, c1946 Format 120
- Konipan SS, ASA 100, Format 135, 120, sheet Film
- Konipan SSS, ASA 200, Format 135
- Konica Infrared 750 nm, Format 135, 120

=== Color negative film ===
- Sakuracolor N100 (C-22) (1967–1971)
- Sakuracolor N100 (C-22) (1971–1975)
- Sakuracolor II N100 (1974–c1984) employing a DIR color coupler
- Sakuracolor (C-41) c1975–1980
- Sakuracolor 400 c1976–1984
- SR (c1984–1986) SR 100/ 200/400/1600 Formats 135, Disc (also sold as Sakuracolor SR)
- SR-V (1987) 3200 Format 135 (also sold as Sakuracolor with same names) Monodispersed emulsion
- SR-G (1989–c1994) 100, Format 135
- SR-G 160 Professional, Format 120/220
- Super DD (1990) 100/200/400 Format 135
- GX (1987) 100, 3200 Format 135
- Impresa 50 1991, Format 120 only
- Impresa 100
- Super HR (?–c1991)
- Super SR (1991–c1997) 100, 200 Format 135, 110
- Super XG (1993–c1996) 100 Format 135
- VX (c1994–1999) 100, 200 Format 135
- VX Super 100, Format 135
- Centuria (1999). 100/200/400/800 Format 135
- Centuria 100 Format 120
- Centuria Super
- Pro 160, Professional Portrait film Format 135, 120, 220
- Pro 400, Professional Portrait film Format 135, 120, 220 exp2007

=== Color reversal (slide) film ===
- Sakuracolor R-100 (E-4) (?–1972)
- Sakurachrome R-100 (E-6) (c1983–c1986)
- Konica Chrome 100 (c1986–1990)

== KONO! ==
Launched in 2014, KONO! is a small European analogue photographic company based in Austria that produces a range of 'creative' 35mm format films under both 'Kono!' and 'dubblefilm' brands, the latter in conjunction with mobile app 'dubble'. Most KONO! films are based on stock originally intended for shooting motion pictures, scientific purposes or other places photosensitive emulsions were used. All films are hand rolled onto recycled 135 film cassettes.

=== Color negative films ===
Make	Name	Dates	Base	ISO	Process	Type	Details	Origin	Formats	Replaced by
KONO!	WINTERMÄRCHEN 200	?–2018	T	200	C-41	Print	Creative color film 'Winter fairytale' pre-exposed with festive images	Austria	135-24	Nothing

== Lomography ==
Headquarters in Vienna, Austria. Lomography is a globally-active organization dedicated to analogue, experimental and creative photography. Lomography offers films under its own brand procured from various manufacturers.

=== Color negative films ===
Make	Name	Dates	Base	ISO	Process	Type	Details	Origin	Formats	Replaced by
Lomography	LomoChrome Turquoise XR	2017–2017	?	100-400	C-41	Print	Creative color negative film with turquoise hues, limited run of 5000 rolls.	?	135, 120	Updated version
Lomography	F^{2} 400	2018	T?	400	C-41	Print	Limited edition run of 120 film cut from a long stored master roll acquired by lomography in 2010, thought to be Ferrania Solaris 400. Previous limited run in 2017 in 135 format only. Pre-order with delivery in Aug 2018, sold out.	Italy	135 (2017), 120 (2018)	Nothing

=== Color reversal (slide) films ===
Make	Name	Dates	Base	ISO	Process	Type	Details	Origin	Formats	Replaced by
Lomography	XPro 200	2010–2018	?	200	E-6	Slide	Cross Processing Slide Film. Needs UV filter for normal colors in E-6. Film is the discontinued Agfa-Gevaert Aviphot Chrome (same formulation as Agfa RSX 200). Unavailable since 2018.	Belgium	135, 120	Nothing
Lomography	Peacock X-Pro	2013-2021	?	200	E-6 (C-41)	Slide (print)	Cross processing slide film in 110 format.	Belgium	110	Nothing

== Luckyfilm ==
Lucky Group Corporation in Baoding, Héběi province, China produced a range of color, black and white, and chromogenic black and white consumer films. Color film was produced initially in conjunction with Kodak after signing a 20-year partnership which Kodak ended in 2007 after four years. Production of all consumer films ceased in 2012. In 2017 Luckyfilm, an offshoot of Lucky Group re-released an improved black and white film for the consumer market, however this had ceased to be available by 2019.

=== Black and white film ===
Make	Name	Dates	Base	ISO	Process	Type	Details	Origin	Formats	Replaced by
Lucky	SHD 100	?–2012	T	100	B&W	Print	General purpose, panchromatic film.	China	135, 120	New SHD 100
Lucky	New SHD 100	2017–2019	P	100	B&W	Print	General purpose, panchromatic film.	China	135	Nothing
Lucky	SHD 400	?–2012	T	400	B&W	Print	General purpose, panchromatic film.	China	135	Nothing
Lucky	SHD 400 CN	?–2012	T	100	C-41	Print	General purpose black and white chromogenic film.	China	135	Nothing

=== Color negative film ===
Make	Name	Dates	Base	ISO	Process	Type	Details	Origin	Formats	Replaced by
Lucky	Luckycolor II	1990s	T	100	C-41	Print	General purpose consumer color film.	China	135	?
Lucky	GBR 100	2003–2012	T	100	C-41	Print	General purpose consumer color film.	China	135	Nothing
Lucky	GBR 200	2003–2012	T	200	C-41	Print	General purpose consumer color film.	China	135	Nothing
Lucky	GBR 400	2003–2012	T	400	C-41	Print	General purpose consumer color film.	China	135	Nothing

== Maco ==
Headquarters in Stapelfeld, Germany. Film sales through www.macodirect.de

=== ORT ===
- Type: Black and White (orthochromatic)
- Speed: ISO 25, DIN 15°
- Available formats: 35 mm, 120, Sheet Film
- Granularity: Extremely Fine
- Resolving power: Extremely High (>330lp/mm)
- History: evolution of Agfa Ort25c, same emulsion as MACO EM micrography film, evolved later in ORTO25
- Primary usage: Reprography, Micrography, specialty black and white photography
- General characteristics:
- Discontinued

== Negra ==
Negra Industrial, S A. was a film manufacturer based in Barcelona, Spain established c1928 producing black and white negative film, photographic paper and chemicals. Color film was rebranded stock from other producers mainly Konishiroku (Konica) and 3M (Ferrania). Film production appears to have ended in 1984.

=== Black and white film ===
- Negra Negrapan 21 (ISO 100) panchromatic film in 135, 120, 127, 110 and 126 sizes. last films expired 1989.

=== Color negative film ===
- Negracolor AR ?–1984 Konica Color
- Negracolor NC80 1970–1973 3M Color Print
- Negracolor NC100 1973–1976 Sakuracolor (Konica)
- Negracolor II 1976–1984 Sakuracolor II (Konica)
- Negracolor 400 1976–1984 Sakuracolor 400 (Konica)

=== Color reversal (slide) film ===
- Negracrome 50 1969–1974 3M color slide

== ORWO ==
After WW2, Agfa was split into two companies: Agfa Photopapierfabrik AG Leverkusen in West Germany, and VEB Film- und Chemiefaserwerk Agfa Wolfen in East Germany. Initially both companies produced films under the AGFA brand with the same names, such as Isopan F. To distinguish them, the film edge markings were L IF for Agfa Leverkusen, and W IF for Agfa Wolfen. In 1953 in a trade agreement it was agreed that VEB Filmfabrik Agfa Wolfen would have the sole rights to the AGFA brand in Eastern Europe and Agfa Photopapierfabrik AG, would retain sole rights to the AGFA brand in the rest of the world. This hampered Wolfen's exports and therefore in 1964 films from Wolfen were rebranded ORWO (ORiginal WOlfen). Filmfabrik Wolfen ceased production of film in 1994 following the collapse of the company after German reunification and privatisation. After a brief revival re-branding other manufacturers' products the company was again insolvent in 1997, and the constituent parts were sold off. Part of the original factory survives as the Industry and Film museum Wolfen. However the association of the ORWO name with film lives on as a brand of FilmoTec GmbH who since 1998 produce high quality black and white cinema and technical films, based in Wolfen with coating contracted out. Their cine camera films UN 54 and N 75 are also re-packaged by third parties as still camera film.

=== Black and white film ===
Make	Name	Dates	Base	ISO	Process	Type	Details	Origin	Formats	Replaced by
Agfa	Isopan FF	c1935–1964	T	8	B&W	Print	Ultra fine grain orthopanchromatic film. Wolfen version also referred to as Isopan FF, marginal markings W IFF. Also sold in 16mm with increased speed of 13/10° DIN for Mikroma cameras.	GDR	Mikroma, 135, 635, 935, SL, 127, 120, 620	ORWO NP 10
Agfa	Isochrom F	c1933–1964	T	40/50	B&W	Print	General purpose fine grain orthochromatic film. 135 films had speed of 17° DIN and roll films had speed of 18° DIN.	GDR	135, 635, 935, SL, 127, 120, 620, 116, 616	ORWO NO 22
Agfa	Isopan F	c1935–1964	T	40	B&W	Print	Fine grain orthopanchromatic film. Wolfen version also referred to Agfa-Isopan-Feinkornfilm, marginal markings W IF. Sheet films were sold with glossy or matt base.	GDR	135, 635, 935, SL, 127, 120, 620, 116, 616, sheet film	ORWO NP 18
Agfa	Isopan ISS	1935–1964	T	100	B&W	Print	'Super Special' introduced around 1935 as a replacement for Superpan. For correct rendering a pale yellow filter was required in daylight and a pale green filter in half-watt illumination. Very fine grain orthopanchromatic film. Wolfen version also referred to as Isopan Super Special, marginal markings W ISS. Sheet films were sold with glossy or matt base.	GDR	135, 635, 935, SL, 127, 120, 620, 116, 616, sheet film	ORWO NP 22
Agfa	Isopan Ultra	c1935–c1958	T	160	B&W	Print	General purpose high speed panchromatic film.	GDR	135, 635, 935, 127, 120, 620, 116, 616	Isopan Rapid
Agfa	Isopan Rapid	c1958–1964	T	250	B&W	Print	General purpose high speed super panchromatic film.	GDR	135, 635, 935, SL, 127, 120, 620, 116, 616, sheet film	ORWO NP 27
ORWO	NP 10	1964–1968	T	8	ORWO 1100 (B&W)	Print	Ultra fine grain panchromatic film.	GDR	135-36, 635-36, SL, 120	ORWO NP 15
ORWO	NP 18	1964–1968	T	50	ORWO 1100 (B&W)	Print	General purpose very fine grain panchromatic film. Sheet film available with glossy or matte back.	GDR	135, 635-36, SL, 127, 120, 620, 116, sheet film	Nothing
ORWO	NO 22	1964–1968	T	125	ORWO 1100 (B&W)	Print	General purpose orthochromatic film with sensitivity from purple to light orange.	GDR	135-36, SL, 127, 120, 620	Nothing
ORWO	NP 22	1964–1968	T	125	ORWO 1100 (B&W)	Print	General purpose fine grain panchromatic film. Sheet film available with glossy or matte back. Discontinued by 1968, reintroduced in the 80s.	GDR	135, 635-36, SL, 127, 120, 620, sheet film	ORWO NP 20
ORWO	NP 27	1964–c1992	T	400	ORWO 1100 (B&W)	Print	General purpose ultra high speed (for its time) super panchromatic film. Sheet film available with glossy back. Due to its extended red sensitivity, NP 27 could be exposed at EI 800/30° in artificial light.	GDR	135, 635-36, SL, 127, 120, 220, 620, sheet film	ORWO PAN 400
ORWO	NI 750	1964-c1972	T	n/a	ORWO 1100 (B&W)	Print	Special infrared film with sensitivity up to 750-760nm. Only edge markings are "ORWO". Since 1968 available only as a cine film.	GDR	135-36	Nothing
ORWO	NP 15	1966–c1992	T	25	ORWO 1100 (B&W)	Print	General purpose fine grain panchromatic film. Also made in 16mm and sold in three-packs for Meopta Mikroma cameras.	GDR	Mikroma, 135-36, 127, 120, 220, sheet film	ORWO PAN 25
ORWO	NP 20	1966–c1992	T	80	ORWO 1100 (B&W)	Print	Introduced in 1966 at Leipzig Trade Fair. General purpose fine grain panchromatic film.	GDR	Kassette 16, 135-36, 635, 127, 120, 220, 620, sheet film	ORWO PAN 100
ORWO	NP 22 (new)	c1980–c1992	T	125	ORWO 1100 (B&W)	Print	NP 22 reintroduced in the 80s. Universal negative film for professional and amateur use.	GDR	135-36, SL, 120, 220, sheet film	ORWO PAN 100
ORWO	NP 30	1983–c1990	T	800	ORWO 1100 (B&W)	Print	General purpose ultra high speed panchromatic film with coarse grain.	GDR	120	Nothing
ORWO	PAN 25	1991–1994	T	25	B&W	Print	General purpose low speed panchromatic film. Most likely NP 15 in DX-coded cassette. Last films expired 1995.	Germany	135, 120	Nothing
ORWO	PAN 100	1991–1994 1995–2005	T	100	B&W	Print	General purpose medium speed panchromatic film. Most likely improved NP 20 emulsion in DX-coded cassette.	Germany	135, 120, sheet film	Nothing
ORWO	PAN 400	1991–1994 1995–c1999	T	400	B&W	Print	General purpose high speed panchromatic film. Most likely NP 27 in DX-coded cassette.	Germany	135, 120	Nothing
ORWO	PAN 125	1995–2005	T	125	B&W	Print	General purpose high speed panchromatic film. Last films expired 2005. Most likely NP 22 in DX-coded cassette.	Germany	135	Nothing
Professional films
Agfa	Isochrom Portrait-Film	c1952–1964	T	50	B&W	Print	Orthochromatic film for portraiture in daylight. Sold with glossy or matte base.	GDR	sheet film	Nothing
Agfa	Isopan Portrait-Film	c1952–1964	T	80	B&W	Print	Orthopanchromatic film for portraiture. Sold with glossy or matte base.	GDR	sheet film	ORWO NP 21 Porträt
Agfa	Isopan Portrait-Rollfilm	?–1964	T	100	B&W	Print	Orthopanchromatic film for portraiture with matte back for retouching.	GDR	120	ORWO NP 22 Porträt
ORWO	NP 21 Porträt	1964–c1966	T	100	ORWO 1100 (B&W)	Print	Panchromatic portrait film with increased red sensitivity. Sold in two variants, glossy and matte.	GDR	sheet film	Nothing
ORWO	NP 22 Porträt	1964–c1966	T	125	ORWO 1100 (B&W)	Print	Fine grain panchromatic film for portraiture with a matte back for retouching.	GDR	120	Nothing
ORWO	NP 20 Porträt	c1978–c1990	T	80	ORWO 1100 (B&W)	Print	Fine grain panchromatic film for portraiture with retouchable emulsion.	GDR	120	Nothing

=== Black and white reversal (slide) film ===
Make	Name	Dates	Base	ISO	Process	Type	Details	Origin	Formats	Replaced by
Agfa	Isopan F Umkehrfilm	?–1964	T	25	ORWO 4100	Slide	Panchromatic slide film.	GDR	135-36	ORWO UP 15
Agfa	Isopan ISS Umkehrfilm	?–1964	T	64	ORWO 4100	Slide	Fine grain black and white reversal 16mm film sold in three-packs for Meopta Mikroma cameras.	GDR	Mikroma	ORWO UP 22
ORWO	UP 15	1964–c1991	T	25	ORWO 4105	Slide	Ultra fine grain panchromatic slide film.	GDR	135-36	Nothing
ORWO	UP 22	c1966–c1970	T	125	ORWO 4100	Slide	Fine grain black and white reversal 16mm film sold in three-packs for Meopta Mikroma cameras.	GDR	Mikroma	Nothing

=== Color negative film ===
Make	Name	Dates	Base	ISO	Process	Type	Details	Origin	Formats	Replaced by
Agfacolor	Negativfilm T	1949–c1958	T	16	ORWO 5160	Print	General purpose unmasked color negative film balanced for daylight.	GDR	135, 120, sheet film	Agfacolor Negativfilm Ultra T
Agfacolor	Negativfilm K	1949–c1958	T	16	ORWO 5160	Print	General purpose unmasked color negative film balanced for artificial light.	GDR	135, 120, sheet film	Agfacolor Negativfilm Ultra K
Agfacolor	Negativfilm Ultra T	1954–1964	T	40	ORWO 5160	Print	General purpose unmasked color film balanced for daylight. Later sold as Agfacolor NT 17.	GDR	135, Karat, 127, 120, 620, sheet film	ORWOCOLOR NT 18
Agfacolor	Negativfilm Ultra K	1954–1964	T	40	ORWO 5160	Print	General purpose unmasked color film balanced for artificial light. Later sold as Agfacolor NK 17.	GDR	135, Karat, 127, 120, 620, sheet film	ORWOCOLOR NK 18
ORWO COLOR	NT 18	1964–1966	T	50	ORWO 5160	Print	General purpose unmasked color negative film balanced for daylight (5500K). Remaining stock of Agfacolor Ultra.	GDR	135, SL, 127, 120, 620, sheet film	ORWOCOLOR NC 16
ORWO COLOR	NK 18	1964–1966	T	50	ORWO 5160	Print	General purpose unmasked color negative film balanced for artificial light (3200K). Remaining stock of Agfacolor Ultra.	GDR	135, SL, 127, 120, 620, sheet film	ORWOCOLOR NC 16
ORWO COLOR	NK 16	1964–1965	T	32	ORWO 5165	Print	First masked color negative film from VEB Filmfabrik Wolfen. Balanced for artificial light.	GDR	120	ORWOCOLOR NC 17 MASK
ORWO COLOR	NC 16	1964–1974	T	32	ORWO 5160 / 5165	Print	General purpose unmasked color negative film. Color balance "universal" film with balance of 4200K.	GDR	135, SL, 127, 120, 620, sheet film	ORWOCOLOR NC 19 MASK
ORWO COLOR	NC 17 Mask	1965–1968	T	40	ORWO 5165	Print	General purpose masked color negative film. Recommended EI is 32/16° for daylight and 50/18° for artificial light.	GDR	135, 127, 120	Nothing
ORWO COLOR	NC 19 Mask	1969–1972	T	64	ORWO 5166 / 5168	Print	General purpose masked color negative film. Balanced for 4200K. Recommended EI is 64/19° for daylight and 50/18° for artificial light.	GDR	135, 127, 120, sheet film	ORWOCOLOR NC 19
ORWO COLOR	NC 19	1972–1990	T/P	64	ORWO 5166 / 5168	Print	Improved version of NC 19 Mask. "Mask" was dropped from the name c1979. Roll and sheet films had PET base. 35mm formats discontinued in 1987, other formats continued production until 1990. Last 120 films expired 1993.	GDR	135, SL, 127, 120, sheet film	ORWOCOLOR NC 21
ORWO COLOR	NC 20	1978–1990	T	80	ORWO 5166 / 5168	Print	General purpose masked color negative film balanced for 4200K. Produced in Kassette 16 format, similar but not identical to 110 format.	GDR	Kassette 16	Nothing
ORWO COLOR	NC 21	1982–1991	T/P	100	ORWO 5168	Print	General purpose masked color negative film for daylight. Roll and sheet films had PET base.	GDR	135, SL, 120, sheet film	ORWOCOLOR PR 100
ORWO COLOR	NC 100	1987–1990	T	100	ORWO 5860 / C-41	Print	Trial production of C-41 compatible film. First ORWO film with oil color couplers. Most likely never marketed.	GDR	?	Nothing
ORWO COLOR	NF 100	1989–1990	T	100	ORWO 5860 / C-41	Print	Color negative film with standard ORWO couplers compatible with C-41 process.	GDR	135	ORWOCOLOR PR 100
ORWO COLOR	PR 100	1990–1991	T	100	ORWO 5860 / C-41	Print	General purpose color negative film for C-41 process. First to be sold with DX-code.	Germany	135	ORWOCOLOR QRS 100
ORWO COLOR	QRS 100	1991–1994	T	100	ORWO 5860 / C-41	Print	Improved version of ORWOCOLOR PR 100. The last color negative film made in Wolfen.	Germany	135, SL	Nothing
ORWO COLOR	QRS 200	c1992–1994	T	200	ORWO 5860 / C-41	Print	General purpose color negative film for daylight. Most likely rebranded Scotch Color.	Italy, Germany	110	Nothing
ORWO COLOR	CNG 100, CNG 200, CNG 400	1992–1994	T	100, 200, 400	ORWO 5860 / C-41	Print	General purpose color negative film. Rebranded Scotch Color EXL.	Italy, Germany	135, SL	Nothing
ORWO	CNN 100, CNN 200, CNN 400	1995–c2004	T	100, 200, 400	C-41	Print	General purpose color negative film. Rebranded Scotch Color EXL Plus.	Italy, Germany	135	Nothing
ORWO	CNS 100, CNS 200, CNS 400	1997–c2002	T	100, 200, 400	C-41	Print	General purpose color negative film. Rebranded Konica Color VX.	Japan, Germany	135	Nothing
Professional films
ORWO COLOR	Professional L	1972–1983	T	40-64	ORWO 5166 / 5168	Print	Professional color negative film balanced for artificial light and long exposures. Around 1977 speed increased to 19° DIN.	GDR	sheet film	Nothing
ORWO COLOR	Professional	1973–1983	T	40-64	ORWO 5166 / 5168	Print	Professional color negative film balanced for 4200K. Around 1977 speed increased to 19° DIN.	GDR	120	Nothing

=== Color reversal (slide) film ===
Make	Name	Dates	Base	ISO	Process	Type	Details	Origin	Formats	Replaced by
Agfacolor	Umkehrfilm T	1948–1955	T	16	ORWO 9160	Slide	General purpose slide film for daylight.	GDR	135, 120, sheet film	Agfacolor Umkehrfilm Ultra T
Agfacolor	Umkehrfilm K	1953–1964	T	16	ORWO 9160	Slide	General purpose slide film for artificial light. Later sold as Agfacolor UK 14.	GDR	135, Karat, 120, 620, sheet film	ORWOCOLOR UK 14
Agfacolor	Umkehrfilm Ultra T	1954–1964	T	32	ORWO 9160	Slide	General purpose slide film for daylight. Later sold as Agfacolor UT 16. Also sold in 16mm for Mikroma cameras.	GDR	Mikroma, 135, Karat, 120, 620, sheet film	ORWOCOLOR UT 16
ORWO COLOR	UT 13	1964–1975	T	16	ORWO 9160	Slide	Very fine grain color reversal film. 16mm cine film confectioned in three-packs or bulk rolls for Meopta Mikroma cameras.	GDR	Mikroma	ORWOCHROM UT 15
ORWO COLOR	UT 16	1964–1968	T	32	ORWO 9160	Slide	General purpose slide film for daylight. Agfacolor Ultra T after brand change.	GDR	135, SL, 127, 120, 620, sheet film	ORWOCHROM UT 16
ORWO COLOR	UK 14	1964–1968	T	20	ORWO 9160	Slide	Slide film for artificial light (3200K). Agfacolor K after brand change.	GDR	135, SL, 127, 120, 620, sheet film	ORWOCOLOR UK 18
ORWO COLOR	UK 18	1965–1974	T	50	ORWO 9160	Slide	Slide film for artificial light (3200K).	GDR	135	ORWOCHROM UK 17
ORWO CHROM	UT 21	1965–c1973	T	100	ORWO 9165	Slide	New-generation slide film for daylight. First produced in the mid-60s, but discontinued due to quality issues. Same technology was later used for other ORWOCHROM films. Film with the same designation was later introduced in the 80s.	GDR	135, 120, sheet film	Nothing
ORWO CHROM	UT 16	1968–1978	T	32	ORWO 9165	Slide	New-generation slow speed slide film for daylight. Probably produced in small quantities.	GDR	135, 120	Nothing
ORWO CHROM	UT 18	1968–1991	T/P	50	ORWO 9165	Slide	New-generation slide film for daylight. Roll and sheet films had PET base.	GDR	135, SL, 120, sheet film	ORWOCHROM DIA 18
ORWO CHROM	UT 21 Spezial	1969–1971	T	100	ORWO 9165	Slide	Special version of ORWOCHROM UT 21 suitable for push processing. The film could be exposed up to EI 200/24°.	GDR	?	Nothing
ORWO CHROM	UK 20	1969–1973	T	80	ORWO 9165	Slide	New-generation high speed slide film for artificial light (3200K).	GDR	135, 120, sheet film	ORWOCHROM UK 17
ORWO CHROM	UK 17	1974–1990	T/P	40	ORWO 9165	Slide	Slide film for artificial light (3200K). Roll films and sheet films had PET base.	GDR	135-36, SL, 120, sheet film	Nothing
ORWO CHROM	UT 15	1975–1980s	T	25	ORWO 9165	Slide	Very fine grain color reversal film for daylight. 16mm cine film confectioned for Meopta Mikroma cameras.	GDR	Mikroma	Nothing
ORWO CHROM	UT 20	1978–1987	T/P	80	ORWO 9165	Slide	Faster slide film for daylight. Production of K16 format continued by 1983. Roll and sheet films had PET base. Other formats were replaced by UT 21 in 1987.	GDR	Kassette 16, 135, SL, 120, sheet film	ORWOCHROM UT 21
ORWO CHROM	UT 23	1982–1989	T/P	160	ORWO 9165	Slide	High speed slide film for daylight. Roll films had PET base.	GDR	135, 120	Nothing
ORWO CHROM	UT 21 (new)	c1984–1991	T/P	100	ORWO 9165	Slide	New UT 21 with emulsion based on UT 20. Roll films had PET base. Initially produced for export markets. In 1987 introduced for domestic market and replaced UT 20.	GDR	135, SL, 120	ORWOCHROM DIA 21
ORWO CHROM	UT 100	1987–1990	T	100	ORWO 9860 / E-6	Slide	Trial production of E-6 compatible film. Never marketed.	GDR	?	Nothing
ORWO CHROM	DIA 18	1991–1994	T	50	ORWO 9165	Slide	UT 18 in DX-coded cassette.	Germany	135	Nothing
ORWO CHROM	DIA 21	1991–1994	T	100	ORWO 9165	Slide	UT 21 in DX-coded cassette.	Germany	135	Nothing
ORWO CHROM	RC 100	1992–1994	T	100	ORWO 9860 / E-6	Slide	Rebranded Scotch Chrome 100.	Italy, Germany	135	Nothing
Professional films
ORWO CHROM	Professional S	1972–1982	P	50	ORWO 9165	Slide	Professional slide film balanced for daylight and short exposures.	GDR	120, sheet film	Nothing
ORWO CHROM	Professional L	1976–1982	P	40	ORWO 9165	Slide	Professional slide film balanced for artificial light and long exposures.	GDR	120, sheet film	Nothing

== Rera ==
Rera is a small range of photographic films for 127 (4x4) format roll film cameras assembled in Japan by Kawauso-Shoten. Film is bought in and converted for 127 format and sold through main retailers. Discontinued films include:

=== Black and white film ===
Make	Name	Dates	Base	ISO	Process	Type	Details	Origin	Formats	Replaced by
Rera	Pan 100	?–2018	T	100	B&W	Print	General purpose panchromatic traditional, medium-speed, black and white film. Discontinued 2018 according to retailers. Replaced by 400 speed emulsion	tbc	127	Pan400

=== Color reversal (slide) film ===
Make	Name	Dates	Base	ISO	Process	Type	Details	Origin	Formats	Replaced by
Rera	Chrome 100	c2016–2017	P	100	E-6	Slide	General purpose color slide film. Possibly an Aviphot Chrome film.	tbc	127	Chrome 100 (2018)

== Perutz ==
Perutz was a German film manufacturer. It was taken over by Agfa-Gevaert in 1964. Films included.

== Polaroid ==
=== Instant Roll Film ===
- Type 20 – Panchromatic 3000/36° The 20 series of films were made for use in the Swinger, Polaroid's first budget camera retailing at $19.95 in 1965
- Type 20C – Panchromatic 3000/36° The first black and white Polaroid film to not require a protective coating on the prints
- Type 31 – Panchromatic 100/21° All films in the 30 series were made for smaller cameras than the 40 series and produced smaller prints
- Type 32 – Panchromatic 200/24°
- Type 37 – Panchromatic 3000/36°
- Type 38 – Color 75/20°
- Type 40 – Sepia tone 100/21°
- Type 41 – Orthochromatic 100/21°
- Type 42 – Panchromatic 200/24° One of Polaroid's longest-lasting film stocks
- Type 43 – Panchromatic 200/24° Introduced for a short while as a higher-end alternative to type 42
- Type 44 – Panchromatic 400/27°
- Type 46 – Panchromatic 800/30° Produced 8 black and white transparencies
- Type 46L – Panchromatic 800/30° Same as 46, but with a slightly larger slides
- Type 47 – Panchromatic 3000/36° Another one of Polaroid's longest-lasting film stocks
- Type 48 – Color 75/20° Polaroid's first color film stock, produced 6 prints instead of the typical 8

=== 4x5 instant sheet film ===
Type 55

- Type: Black and white Pos/Neg instant film
- Speed: 50/18° (pos), 35/16° (neg)
- Available formats: 4×5 Sheet film
- Granularity:
- Latitude:
- Resolving power:
- History: Discontinued by Polaroid in 2008; production process licensed out
- Primary usage: Test shots, fine art

=== Instant 35mm slide film ===
Make	Name	Dates	Base	ISO	Process	Type	Details	Origin	Formats	Replaced by
Polaroid	PolaChrome CS	c1985–c2004	?	40	?	Slide	Instant color slide film based on Polavision. Not a true color slide film. Combination of black and white instant slide film with colored matrix to produce color image.	USA	135-12, 135-36	Nothing
Polaroid	High Contrast PolaChrome HCP	?–c2003	?	40	?	Slide	Intended for reproduction of colored charts and graphics. Produces high contrast images. Same as PolaChrome CS, sold with developing chemicals for PolaGraph HC to produce higher contrast.	USA	135-12	Nothing
Polaroid	PolaPan CT	c1985–c2003	?	125	?	Slide	Black and white instant slide film.	USA	135-12, 135-36	Nothing
Polaroid	PolaGraph HC	c1985–c2003	?	400	?	Slide	Intended for reproducing graphics. Produces high contrast images.	USA	135-12	Nothing
Polaroid	PolaBlue BN	?–c2003	?	8	?	Slide	Intended for title slides and reproducing charts. Not a true slide film, produces negative white on blue images.	USA	135-12	Nothing

== Polaroid B.V. ==
Polaroid B.V. is a Dutch photography company that was founded in 2008 as the 'Impossible Project' to re-introduce instant film for Polaroid cameras. Impossible bought the production machinery from Polaroid for $3.1 million and leased a building, called Building Noord, which was formerly part of the Polaroid plant in Enschede, Netherlands but had to re-invent the emulsions and processes. Polaroid Corporation's brand and intellectual property were acquired by Impossible Project's largest shareholder in 2017 and the company was later renamed 'Polaroid Originals' before becoming 'Polaroid' in 2020. Based in Enschede, Polaroid manufactures film for its own and selected original Polaroid instant cameras. Instant films are marketed by format rather than emulsion.

Make	Name	Dates	Base	ISO	Process	Type	Details	Origin	Formats	Replaced by
Polaroid Originals	Spectra film	2013–2019	N/A	640	Instant	Print	General purpose instant color or black and white film in various frame styles. In October 2019, Polaroid Originals announced the discontinuation of the Spectra film format due to poor reliability of the remaining Spectra cameras.	Netherlands	103x 101mm	Nothing

== Rollei ==
The Rollei brand for photographic film is licensed to Maco (Hans O. Mahn GmbH & Co. KG, Maco Photo Products) a German-based supplier of photographic films. They offer a range of black and white and color films produced by Agfa-Gevaert and other suppliers. Discontinued films are listed below:

=== Black and white films ===
==== R3 ====
- Speed: ISO 200, DIN 24° (can be used from ISO25 to ISO6400)
- Available formats: 35 mm, 120, Sheet Film
- Granularity: Fine
- Resolving power: High
- History: launched in 2004
- Primary usage: General black and white photography
- General characteristics: Fairly wide latitude, PET base for better film flatness, extended spectral sensitivity from IR to near-UV, to be stored in special black cartridges
- Discontinued

==== ATO (Advanced Technical Ortho) ====
- same emulsion as Maco Genius Film
- clear base
- suitable for reversal process

==== ATP1.1 (Advanced Technical Pan) ====
- Formats: 120
- Speed: ISO 32
- High resolution Super-panchromatic film (extended red sensitivity).
- Converted and packaged by Foma

==== Rollei Ortho ====
- orthochromatic film with a clear base
- spectral sensitivity 380–610 nm
- resolving power of 330 lines/mm (with a fine-grain developer)
- especially suited for digital scanning
- Replaced by Ortho Plus in 2017

==== Rollei Pan ====
- ISO 25
- clear base, well suited for black and white slides

==== Retro Tonal ====
- same emulsion as Maco PO100C
- an orthopanchromatic ("RectePan") film
- clear base
- suitable for reversal process

==== RSD ====
- same emulsion as Agfa Copex Slide Direct
- a pre-fogged orthochromatic film specially for negative or slide duplication
- exposure index (EI) in daylight around 0.2 (thus it has a DIN value of -6 !) = about EI 6 + 5 f stops (not many cameras will handle this correctly)
- after a massive exposure will produce a positive in traditional B&W process, i.e. is NOT run through a reversal process; see also solarisation
- contrast adjustment using different developers, i.e. lower contrast: for ex. Rodinal/Adonal (1:25 about 10 mins., 1:50 about 20 mins.) or higher contrast: any paper developer 1+4 about 5 mins.

=== Color negative film ===
Make	Name	Dates	Base	ISO	Process	Type	Details	Origin	Formats	Replaced by
Rollei	CN 200	2008–2017	P	200	C-41	Print	Unmasked color film of an older aesthetic well suited for scanning. (Agfa Aviphot Color X100). Originally called digibase CN 200 pro. Final stocks in 120 lasted until mid 2018.	Belgium	135, 120	Nothing

=== Color reversal (slide) film ===
Make	Name	Dates	Base	ISO	Process	Type	Details	Origin	Formats	Replaced by
Rollei	CR 200	?–2017 stock only	P	200	E-6	Slide	General purpose older aesthetic slide film (Agfa-Gevaert Aviphot Chrome 200, Same emulsion as Agfa RSX II 200) 135 sold out. Originally called digibase CR 200 pro	Belgium	120	CrossBird
Rollei	Crossbird	2017–2022	?	200	E-6 (C-41)	Slide (print)	General purpose rebranded older slide film. Suitable for corss-processing in C-41. Still on Rollei's website but no longer sold.	Belgium	135, 127	Nothing
Rollei	Vario Chrome	2017–2017	T?	200	E-6	Slide	Limited edition film in 2017 converted from expired slide stock. Can be exposed between 200/24° to 400/27° ISO without adjusting development. Gives earthy grainy colors.	Belgium?	135	Nothing

=== ScanFilm ===
- same emulsion as Agfa Aviphot Color X400 without a mask, very well suited for scanning

== Silberra ==
The company based in Saint Petersburg, Russia was founded in 2009 producing analog film products. It adopted the Silberra name in 2017 to introduce a range of black and white films.

=== Black and white films ===
Make	Name	Dates	Base	ISO	Process	Type	Details	Origin	Formats	Replaced by
Silberra	Orta 100	2018–2019	P	100	B&W	Print	Orthochromatic film (insensitive to red light) with high contrast	Russia	135-36	Nothing
Silberra	Cinema 74N+	2018–2019	P	400	B&W	Print	Converted from ORWO N74 plus cinema film	Russia/ Germany	135-36	Cinema 75N+

== Slavich ==
Slavich (Russian: Славич, Переславский химический завод) was a manufacturer of photographic and cinematographic films and photographic papers located in Pereslavl, Russia, it has been in operation since 1931 starting as “Film Factory No. 5”. Production of photographic films was phased out in the 1960s and production focused on photographic papers.

=== Black and white film ===
Make	Name	Dates	Base	ISO	Process	Type	Details	Origin	Formats	Replaced by
Factory No. 5	Ортохром (Ortochrom)	?–?	T	50, 80	B&W	Print	General purpose orthochromatic film. Speed and development time were stamped on the box.	USSR	935, 120	Nothing
Factory No. 5	Изопанхром (Isopanchrom)	?–c1965	T	50, 80, 160	B&W	Print	General purpose panchromatic film sold in three gradations: soft, normal and hard. Speed and development time were stamped on the box.	USSR	935, 120	Nothing

== SPUR ==
SPUR (Speed Photography & Ultra high Resolution) is a supplier of own brand specialist photochemistry and films based in Langerwehe, Germany.

Make	Name	Dates	Base	ISO	Process	Type	Details	Origin	Formats	Replaced by
SPUR	UR	?–2019	P	20	B&W	Print	Agfa-Gevaert Copex HDP microfilm. Resolution of up to 800 LP/mm. Same film as ADOX CMS20 II	Belgium	135, 120	Ultra R 800

== Street Candy ==
Vincent Moschetti, the proprietor of the website OneYearWithFilmOnly.com (later renamed OnFilmOnly.com) released his own branded film in 2018. In April 2022 the founder announced closure of the brand due to rising costs. Film cassettes are uniquely packaged in cardboard film canisters.

Make	Name	Dates	Base	ISO	Process	Type	Details	Origin	Formats	Replaced by
Street Candy	MTN 100	2021–2022	P	100	B&W	Print	Panchromatic B&W Cine film negative film stock also capable of reversal processing. Stated to be 'from a German manufacturer with a century long tradition in motion picture film' Probably ORWO UN54. Loaded on recycled cassettes which are not DX coded.	Germany	135-36	Nothing
Street Candy	ATM 400	2018–2022	P	400	B&W	Print	Panchromatic B&W film stock originally designed for use in security and surveillance cameras in banks and ATM machines. Loaded on recycled cassettes which are not DX coded.	?	135-36	Nothing

== Svema ==
Svema (Russian: Свема, Светочувствительные Материалы) was the former name (NPO "Svema") of the Shostka Chemical Plant, located in Shostka, Sumy Oblast, Ukraine. It was founded in 1931 in Ukrainian SSR. The brand name "Svema" was adopted in 1965.

"Svema" was the major photographic film manufacturer in the USSR and the second largest film producer in Europe, but their film lost market share in former Soviet countries to imported products during the late 1990s. They made black-and-white photographic film, photographic paper, B&W/color cine film and magnetic tapes until 2000. Color film was made with equipment dismantled from the Agfa-Wolfen Factory after World War II. The plant's production of photographic products slowed through the 1990s and ceased film production entirely in 2003 with the final coating of X-ray films there and the plant closed completely in 2005. After attempts by the state to sell the business, bankruptcy processes were completed in 2015. The coating machinery was sold for scrap and the main buildings were demolished c2018.

A decade prior to the plant's closure a small group of Svema employees had founded Astrum holdings in a rented building on the site in 1995, buying bulk film from various sources which they converted and packaged, for retail sale. Originally sold under the Astrum name (film expiring up to 2019), they later acquired rights to the Svema trademark and now apply the name to a range of films for nostalgic value, but this no longer manufactured in Ukraine, only re-packaged there.

All consumer film was produced in 135 and 120 formats, some stocks were also available in sheets, 16mm and 8mm/Super 8.

=== Black and white film ===
Make	Name	Dates	Base	ISO	Process	Type	Details	Origin	Formats	Replaced by
Factory No. 3	Ортохром (Ortochrom)	?–?	T	50, 80	B&W	Print	General purpose orthochromatic film. Also manufactured by Slavich. Speed and development time were stamped on the box. Speeds stamped on the box were: 45, 65.	USSR	935, 120	Nothing
Factory No. 3	Изопанхром (Isopanchrom)	?–c1965	T	40, 50, 80, 100, 160, 200	B&W	Print	General purpose panchromatic film sold in three gradations: soft, normal and hard. Also manufactured by Slavich. 16mm format for subminiature cameras. Speed and development time were stamped on the box. Speeds stamped on the box were: 32, 45, 65, 90, 130, 180.	USSR	16mm, 935, 120	Foto 32, Foto 65, Foto 130
Factory No. 3 / Svema	Фото 32 (Foto 32)	c1965–1987	T	40	B&W	Print	General purpose fine grain panchromatic film. Speed in old GOST speed scale.	USSR	135, 635, 935, 120, sheet film	Foto 32
Factory No. 3 / Svema	Фото 65 (Foto 65)	c1965–1987	T	80	B&W	Print	General purpose panchromatic film. Speed in old GOST speed scale.	USSR	135, 635, 935, 120, sheet film	Foto 64
Factory No. 3 / Svema	Фото 130 (Foto 130)	c1965–1987	T	160	B&W	Print	General purpose panchromatic film. Speed in old GOST speed scale.	USSR	135, 635, 935, 120, sheet film	Foto 125
Factory No. 3 / Svema	Фото 250 (Foto 250)	c1965–1987	T	320	B&W	Print	General purpose super panchromatic film. For exposures in artificial light, it should be rated at ISO 400/27°. Speed in old GOST speed scale.	USSR	135, 635, 935, 120, sheet film	Foto 250
Svema	ФН 32 (FN 32)	?–1990s	T	32	B&W	Print	"Non-standard" film conforming to ASA scale. Fine grain panchromatic film.	USSR	135, 120	Nothing
Svema	ФН 64 (FN 64)	?–1990s	T	64	B&W	Print	"Non-standard" film conforming to ASA scale. 16mm format for subminiature cameras. Panchromatic film. Bulk last expired 1/94.	USSR	16mm, 135, 120, sheet film	Nothing
Svema	ФН 125 (FN 125)	?–1990s	T	125	B&W	Print	"Non-standard" film conforming to ASA scale. Panchromatic film.	USSR	135, 120	Nothing
Svema	ФН 250 (FN 250)	?–1990s	T	250	B&W	Print	"Non-standard" film conforming to ASA scale. Super panchromatic film. For exposures in artificial light, it should be rated at ISO 320/26°.	USSR	135, 120	Nothing
Svema	Фото 32 (Foto 32)	1987–?	T	32	B&W	Print	General purpose fine grain panchromatic film. Speed in new GOST speed scale, same as ASA.	USSR	135, 120	Foto 50
Svema	Фото 64 (Foto 64)	1987–?	T	64	B&W	Print	General purpose panchromatic film. Speed in new GOST speed scale, same as ASA.	USSR	135, 120	Foto 100
Svema	Фото 125 (Foto 125)	1987–?	T	125	B&W	Print	General purpose panchromatic film. Speed in new GOST speed scale, same as ASA.	USSR	135, 120	Foto 200
Svema	Фото 250 (Foto 250)	1987–?	T	250	B&W	Print	General purpose super panchromatic film. For exposures in artificial light, it should be rated at ISO 320/26°. Speed in new GOST speed scale, same as ASA.	USSR	135, 120	Foto 400
Svema	Фото 50 (Foto 50)	1990–?	T	50	B&W	Print	General purpose medium speed panchromatic film.	Ukraine	135, 120	Nothing
Svema	Фото 100 (Foto 100)	1990–?	T	100	B&W	Print	General purpose panchromatic film.	Ukraine	135, 120	Nothing
Svema	Фото 200 (Foto 200)	1990–?	T	200	B&W	Print	General purpose panchromatic film.	Ukraine	135, 120	Nothing
Svema	Фото 400 (Foto 400)	1990–?	T	400	B&W	Print	General purpose high speed panchromatic film.	Ukraine	135, 120	Nothing
Svema	Репортер (Reporter)	1990s	T	200	B&W	Print	General purpose fast panchromatic film.	Ukraine	135-36	Nothing

=== Color negative film ===
Make	Name	Dates	Base	ISO	Process	Type	Details	Origin	Formats	Replaced by
Factory No. 3	ДС-1 (DS-1)	1948–?	T	20	Agfacolor	Print	Unmasked color negative film balanced for daylight. Cine film confectioned for still photography. Produced at Agfa Wolfen in 1946-1947.	USSR	?	DS-2
Factory No. 3	ЛН-1 (LN-1)	1948–?	T	20	Agfacolor	Print	Unmasked color negative film balanced for artificial light. Cine film confectioned for still photography. Produced at Agfa Wolfen in 1946-1947.	USSR	?	?
Factory No. 3 / Svema	ДС-2 (DS-2)	1950s–1970s	T	50	GOST 5554-70	Print	Unmasked color negative film balanced for daylight. 45 GOST (old).	USSR	135, 120	DS-4
Svema	ДС-5М (DS-5M)	1960s–1970s	T	40	GOST 5554-70	Print	Masked color negative film balanced for daylight. 32 GOST (old).	USSR	135, 120	CND-32
Svema	ЛН-5М (LN-5M)	1960s–1970s	T	40	GOST 5554-70	Print	Masked color negative film balanced for artificial light. 32 GOST (old).	USSR	135, 120	CNL-32
Svema	ЦНД-32 (CND-32)	1970s–c1994	T	40	GOST 5554-70	Print	Masked color negative film balanced for daylight, after 1987 changed to ISO 32/16°.	USSR	135-36, 935-36, 120, sheet film	Nothing
Svema	ЦНЛ-32 (CNL-32)	?–1970s	T	40	GOST 5554-70	Print	Masked color negative film balanced for artificial light.	USSR	135, 120	Nothing
Svema	ЦНД-65 (CND-65)	1970s–c1987	T	80	GOST 5554-70	Print	Masked color negative film balanced for daylight.	USSR	135, 120	CND-64
Svema	ЦНЛ-65 (CNL-65)	1970s–c1987	T	80	GOST 5554-70	Print	Masked color negative film balanced for artificial light.	USSR	935-36, 120, sheet film	CNL-90
Svema	ЦНД-90 (CND-90)	1980s–?	T	100	GOST 5554-70	Print	Masked color negative film, daylight-balanced. After 1987 speed changed to ISO 80/20°.	USSR	135, 120	Nothing
Svema	ЦНЛ-90 (CNL-90)	1980s–?	T	100	GOST 5554-70	Print	Masked color negative film, tungsten-balanced. After 1987 speed changed to ISO 80/20°.	USSR	135-36, 120	Nothing
Svema	ДС-4 (DS-4)	?–c1990	T	50	GOST 5554-70	Print	Unmasked color negative film balanced for daylight. Originally 45 GOST (old), after 1987 changed to 50 GOST.	USSR	135-36, 120, sheet film	Nothing
Svema	ЦНД-64 (CND-64)	c1987–?	T	64	GOST 5554-70	Print	Masked color negative film, daylight-balanced.	USSR	135, 120	Nothing
Svemacolor	ДС 100 (DS 100)	c1990-?	T	100	C-41	Print	Masked color negative film, daylight-balanced.	Ukraine	135, 120	Nothing

=== Color reversal (slide) film ===
Make	Name	Dates	Base	ISO	Process	Type	Details	Origin	Formats	Replaced by
Factory No. 3	ЦО-1 (CO-1)	1949–?	T	20	Agfacolor	Slide	Daylight-balanced color reversal film. 16 GOST (old).	USSR	?	CO-2
Factory No. 3 / Svema	ЦО-2 (CO-2)	1960s–1970s	T	40	GOST	Slide	Daylight-balanced color reversal film. 32 GOST (old).	USSR	135, 120	CO-32D
Svema	ЦО-22Д (CO-22D)	?–c1987	T	25	GOST	Slide	Daylight-balanced color reversal film.	USSR	135, 120	Nothing
Svema	ЦО-32Д (CO-32D)	1970s–c1993	T	40	GOST	Slide	Daylight-balanced color reversal film. After 1987 speed changed to ISO 32/16°.	USSR	135, 935, 120	CO-50D
Svema	ЦО-90Л (CO-90L)	1970s–?	T	100	GOST	Slide	Tungsten-balanced color reversal film. After 1987 speed changed to ISO 80/20°.	USSR	135, 120	Nothing
Svema	ЦО-65Д (CO-65D)	?–c1987	T	80	GOST	Slide	Daylight-balanced color reversal film.	USSR	135, 120	CO-50D
Svema	ЦО-180Л (CO-180L)	1980s–?	T	200	GOST	Slide	Tungsten-balanced color reversal film.	USSR	135, 120	Nothing
Svema	ЦО-50Д (CO-50D)	c1987–c1994	T	50	GOST	Slide	Daylight-balanced color reversal film.	USSR	135, 120	Nothing

== Tasma ==
Tasma (Russian: Тасма, Татарские светочувствительные материалы) was a manufacturer of photographic films located in Kazan, Russia, it has been in operation since 1933 starting as “Film Factory No. 8”. The name “Tasma” is derived from the Russian name "TAtarskie Svetochuvstvitelnye MAterialy" – "TAtar Sensitized MAterials", it was adopted by the company in 1974. Prior to the fall of the Soviet Union, the company offered an array of color photographic products since 1950, but these were discontinued following the fall of the Iron Curtain. After the dissolution of the Soviet Union, the company was reorganized as a free enterprise and privatized in 1992. Photographic film production ceased in the 1990s and today they specialise in industrial films including aerial photography films. Films generally supplied without spool in a black paper wrapper and box.

=== Black and white film ===
Make	Name	Dates	Base	ISO	Process	Type	Details	Origin	Formats	Replaced by
Factory No. 8	Изопанхром (Isopanchrom)	?–c1965	T	80, 100	B&W	Print	General purpose panchromatic film. Made in three gradations: soft, normal and hard. GOST speed and development time stamped on the box. Speeds stamped on the box were: 65, 90.	USSR	935	?
Kazan / Tasma	Фото 32 (Foto 32)	c1965–1987	T	40	B&W	Print	General purpose fine grain panchromatic film.	USSR	935	Foto 32
Kazan / Tasma	Фото 65 (Foto 65)	c1965–1987	T	80	B&W	Print	General purpose panchromatic film.	USSR	935, sheet film	Foto 64
Kazan / Tasma	Фото 130 (Foto 130)	c1965–1987	T	160	B&W	Print	General purpose panchromatic film.	USSR	935	Foto 125
Tasma	Фото 250 (Foto 250)	?–1987	T	320	B&W	Print	General purpose super panchromatic film. For exposures in artificial light, it should be rated at ISO 400/27°.	USSR	935	Foto 250
Tasma	ФН 64 (FN 64)	?-c1993	T	64	B&W	Print	"Non-standard" film conforming to ASA scale. Panchromatic film.	USSR	935	Nothing
Tasma	МЗ-3Л (MZ-3L)	?–1990	T	6	B&W	Positive	Slow speed orthochromatic positive film.	USSR	935	Nothing
Tasma	Фото 32 (Foto 32)	1987–?	T	32	B&W	Print	General purpose fine grain panchromatic film.	USSR	935	Nothing
Tasma	Фото 64 (Foto 64)	1987–?	T	64	B&W	Print	General purpose panchromatic film.	USSR	935	Nothing
Tasma	Фото 125 (Foto 125)	1987–?	T	125	B&W	Print	General purpose panchromatic film.	USSR	935	Nothing
Tasma	Фото 250 (Foto 250)	1987–?	T	250	B&W	Print	General purpose super panchromatic film. For exposures in artificial light, it should be rated at ISO 320/26°.	USSR	935	Nothing
Tasma	100 Super	1990–?	T	100	B&W	Print	General purpose panchromatic film.	Russia	135-36	Nothing

=== Black and white reversal (slide) film ===
Make	Name	Dates	Base	ISO	Process	Type	Details	Origin	Formats	Replaced by
Tasma	ОЧ 45 (OCh 45)	1980s	T	50	B&W	Slide	General purpose panchromatic reversal film. Speed 45 GOST (old).	USSR	935	Och 50
Tasma	ОЧ 50 (OCh 50)	c1987–?	T	50	B&W	Slide	General purpose panchromatic reversal film.	USSR	635	Nothing

=== Color negative film ===
Make	Name	Dates	Base	ISO	Process	Type	Details	Origin	Formats	Replaced by
Tasma	ЦНД-32 (CND-32)	?–1990	T	40	GOST 5554-70	Print	Masked color negative film, daylight-balanced, after 1987 speed changed to ISO 32/16°.	USSR	935	Nothing
Tasma	ЦНЛ-32 (CNL-32)	?–?	T	40	GOST 5554-70	Print	Masked color negative film, tungsten-balanced.	USSR	935	Nothing
Tasma	ДС-4 (DS-4)	?–1990	T	50	GOST 5554-70	Print	Unmasked color negative film, daylight-balanced. 45 GOST (old).	USSR	935	Nothing

=== Color reversal (slide) film ===
Make	Name	Dates	Base	ISO	Process	Type	Details	Origin	Formats	Replaced by
Tasma	ЦО-22Д (CO-22D)	1950s–c1987	T	25	GOST	Slide	Daylight-balanced color reversal film.	USSR	935	Nothing
Tasma	ЦО-32Д (CO-32D)	1950s–c1987	T	40	GOST	Slide	Daylight-balanced color reversal film.	USSR	935	CO-50D
Tasma	ЦО-65Д (CO-65D)	1950s–c1987	T	80	GOST	Slide	Daylight-balanced color reversal film.	USSR	935	Nothing
Tasma	ЦО-50Д (CO-50D)	c1987–?	T	50	GOST	Slide	Daylight-balanced color reversal film.	USSR	935	Nothing

== Valca ==
Valca was a Spanish film manufacturer established in 1940 headquartered in Bilbao. The company name comes from the factory location in Sopeñano, Burgos; Valle de Mena (Mena Valley) through which flows the Rio Cadagua (Cadagua River) which provided cooling water for the factory. The company produced black and white negative film, photographic paper and X ray films. Ilford acquired an equity interest in Valca in 1960, resulting in technical co-operation and Valca acting as Ilford distributors in Spain. The agreement lasted until 1976 when Ilford sold its shares. It was particularly successful in the X-ray film market and in 1991 it had a 17% share of its national market and 1% of the US market, the latter accounting for 60% of production, with 65% of X-ray film exported in total. While black and white film was produced in-house, color film was rebranded stock from other suppliers. The company underwent re-structuring in 1991 due to financial problems, reportedly due to poor management and the factory finally closed in 1993.

=== Black and white film ===
- Valca Sheet Film Autographica – Panchromatica Antihalo
- Valca Sheet Film Retrato V Orthochromatic
- Valca Sheet Film Retrato VV Panchromatic
- Valca Sheet Film Retrato ES Panchromatic
- Valca Diapositiva Dura
- Valca F22 – ASA 125 (sheet film 9×12 cm, 35mm, 120, 620 & 126) Possibly based on FP4
- Valca H27 – ASA 400 Possibly based on Ilford HP3
- Valca H29 – ASA 400 (sheet film, 35mm, 120) Possibly based on Ilford HP4

=== color negative films ===
- Valcolor, 1974–1975 Sakuracolor N100
- Valcolor II – 1975–1977 Sakuracolor II
- Valcolor II – 1977–1980 (35mm, 126, 120, 110) 3M color print 100
- Valcolor HR100 – ?–1991 (35mm & 126) Konica color 100

== See also ==
- List of photographic films
