= Agfa Ambiflex =

35mm SLR camera

Ambiflex
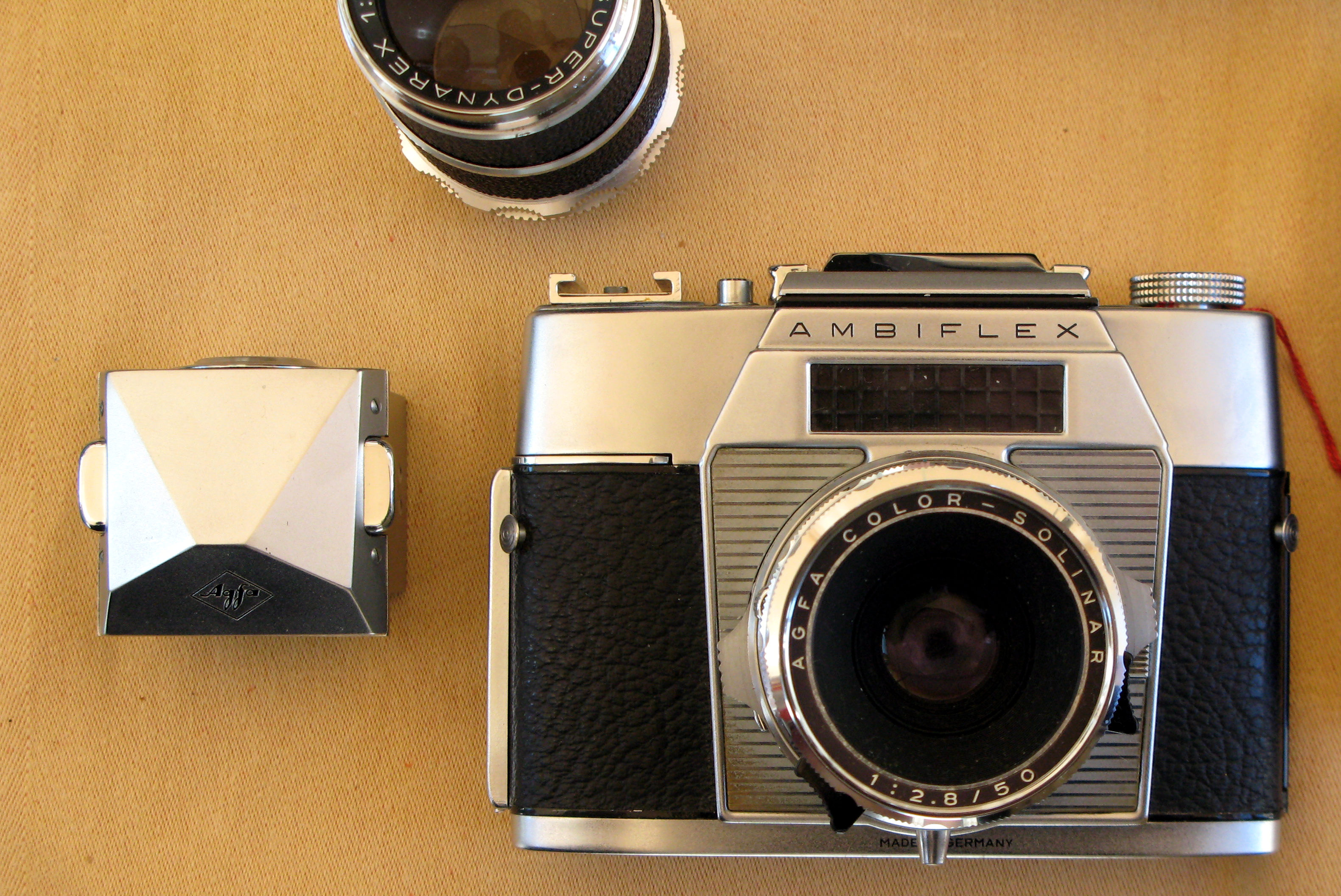

Overview
- Type: 35mm SLR camera

Focusing
- Focus: manual

Exposure/metering
- Exposure: manual

The Agfa Ambiflex was a SLR for 35mm film, made by Agfa in c.1960. It was made for interchangeable lenses but had a leaf shutter. Its viewfinder unit could also be exchanged – there were pentaprism and waist-level finders. The Ambiflex was equipped with a coupled selenium light meter and a self-timer.
