= Agfa Optima 1a =

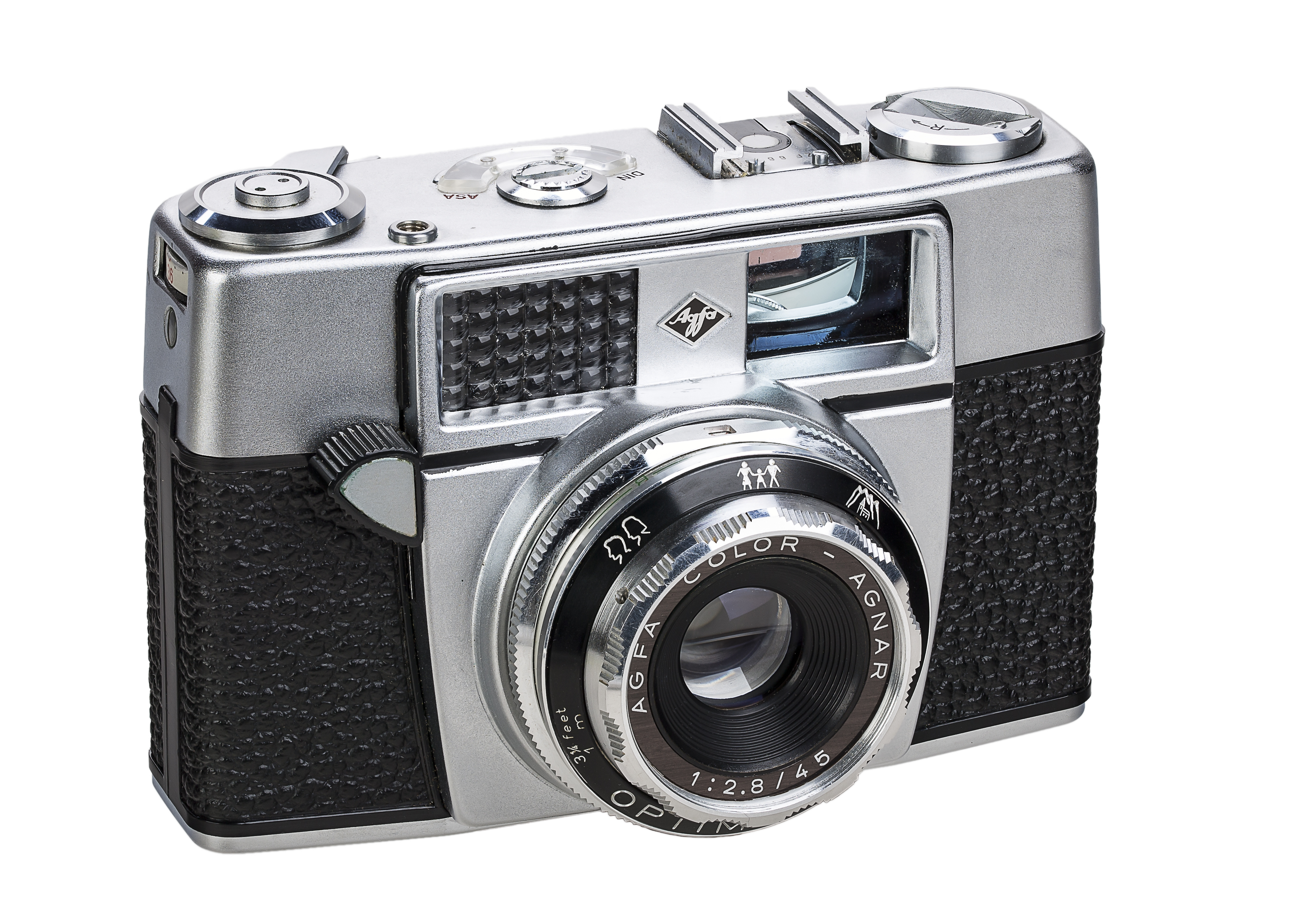

Overview
- Maker: Agfa-Gevaert
- Type: 35 mm

Lens
- Lens: Agfa Color-Agnar f2.8/45

Focusing
- Focus: manual

Exposure/metering
- Exposure: Automatic

Flash
- Flash: Hot shoe

General
- Dimensions: 121×82×68 mm (4.8×3.2×2.7 in)

First produced in 1962, the Agfa Optima 1a or Agfamatic was one of the first fully automatic scale-focusing 35mm film cameras. The successor to German camera manufacturer Agfa's Optima 1 camera, the camera employed a selenium cell that generated a voltage related to the luminance, to both measure the light level and to provide the power required for automatic setting of aperture and shutter speed. Other features included a flash mode which overrode the automatic mode to set the camera shutter speed to 1/30s, and a bulb mode for long exposures.
