= Agfa Optima Flash Sensor =

German 35 mm viewfinder camera

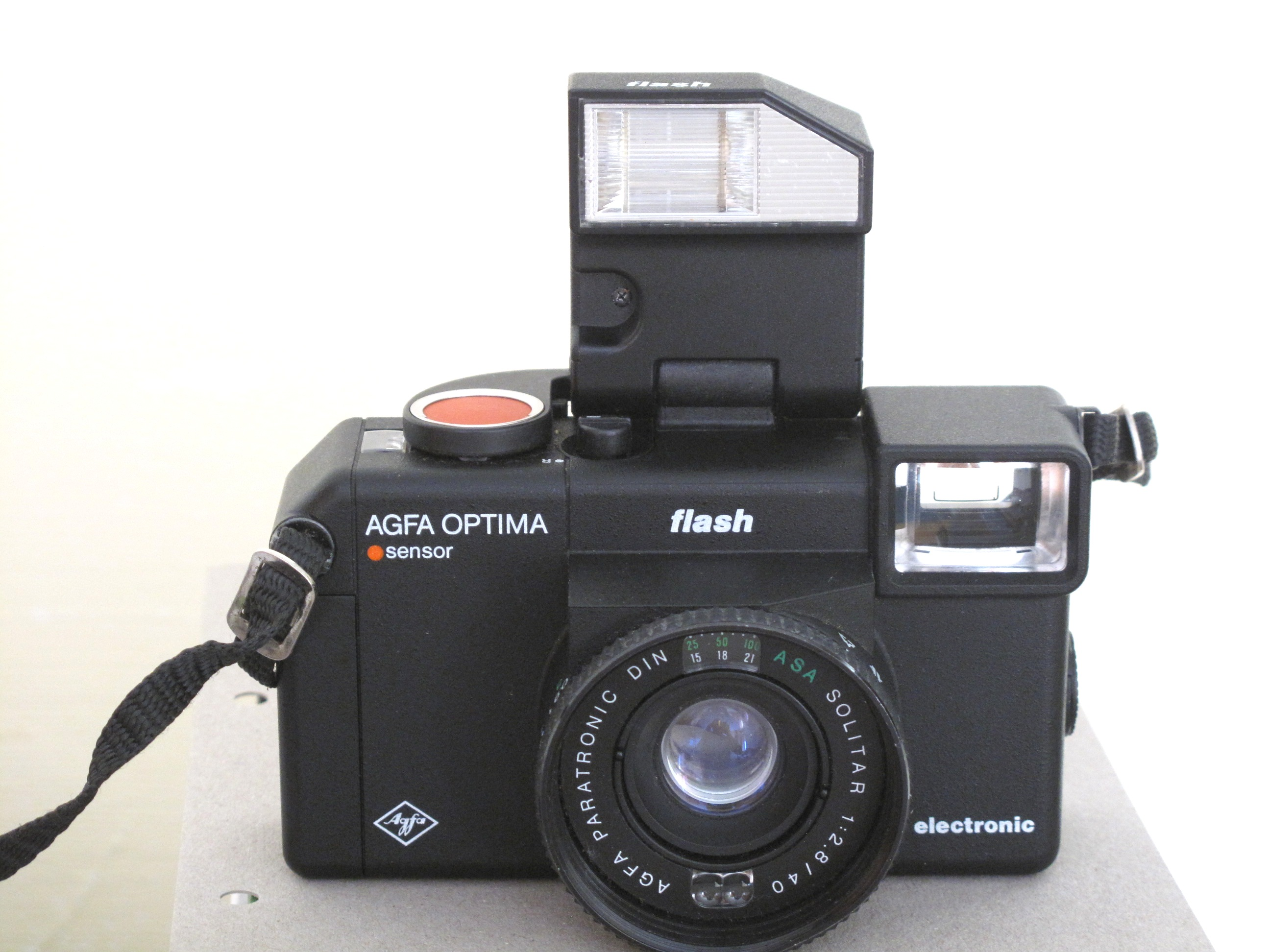
Agfa Optima Flash Sensor

The Agfa Optima Flash is a fixed-lens 35 mm viewfinder camera manufactured in Germany by Agfa from 1981 to 1983. It belongs to the Agfa Optima series, features the same big red Sensor shutter-release and large viewfinder as any other in the series, with some improvements and a built-in flash.

== Specifications ==
- Lens: Agfa Solitar 40mm f2.8; four elements in three groups
- Focus: Manual 0.9m to infinity scale-focus
- Shutter: 2-bladed leaf-shutter
- Shutter speed: 1/45s – 1/1000s automatic
- Aperture: f2.8 – f22 automatic
- Exposure mode: Programmed automatic
- Exposure sensor: Twin CdS cells
- Viewfinder: Bright-line type
- Flash: Integral – manually raised when required
- Flash Guide Number: 12 ASA 100
- Filter size: 49mm
- Film type: 135 film
- Film speed range: ASA 25 – 500
- Film advance: Manual – lever-wind
- Film rewind: Manual – uses same lever as film-advance (rewind-mode selected via dedicated button)
- Battery: Two 1.5 Volt type AAA
- Size: 122 x 85 x 68 mm when folded, 122 x 119 x 68 mm with flash open (w h d)
- Weight: 329 gram
- Self-timer: No
- Tripod mount: Yes
