= Agfa Clack =

120-film camera model

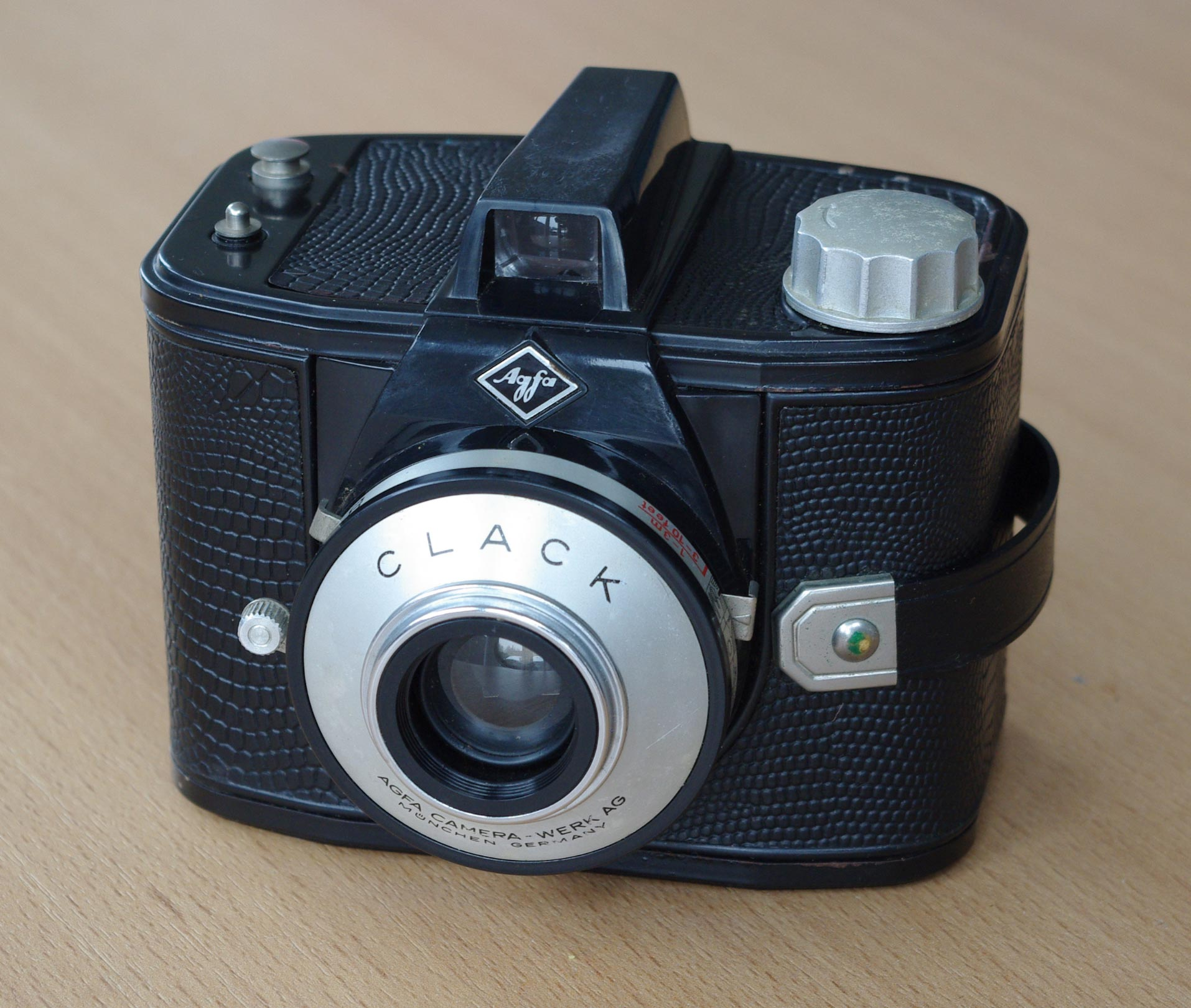
Agfa Clack

The Agfa Clack is a box camera produced by Agfa from 1954 to 1965. It was sold in North America as the Agfa Weekender.

It is a simple camera which was aimed at the mass market. About 1.65 million were produced, more than all other Agfa box camera models combined.

It uses 120 film, creating large 6x9 negatives that were usually contact printed (transferred directly from the negative onto photographic paper without enlarging).

It has only one shutter speed, and, depending on model, either a single f/11 f-stop or a choice of two.

Despite being an inexpensive mass-market camera, the Clack has retained a following among film and lomography photographers, who value the soft, vignetted images produced by its simple meniscus lens and its large 6×9 negatives.

The Agfa Clack played a central role in the 2013 novel, Klack, by German author Klaus Modick.

== Gallery ==
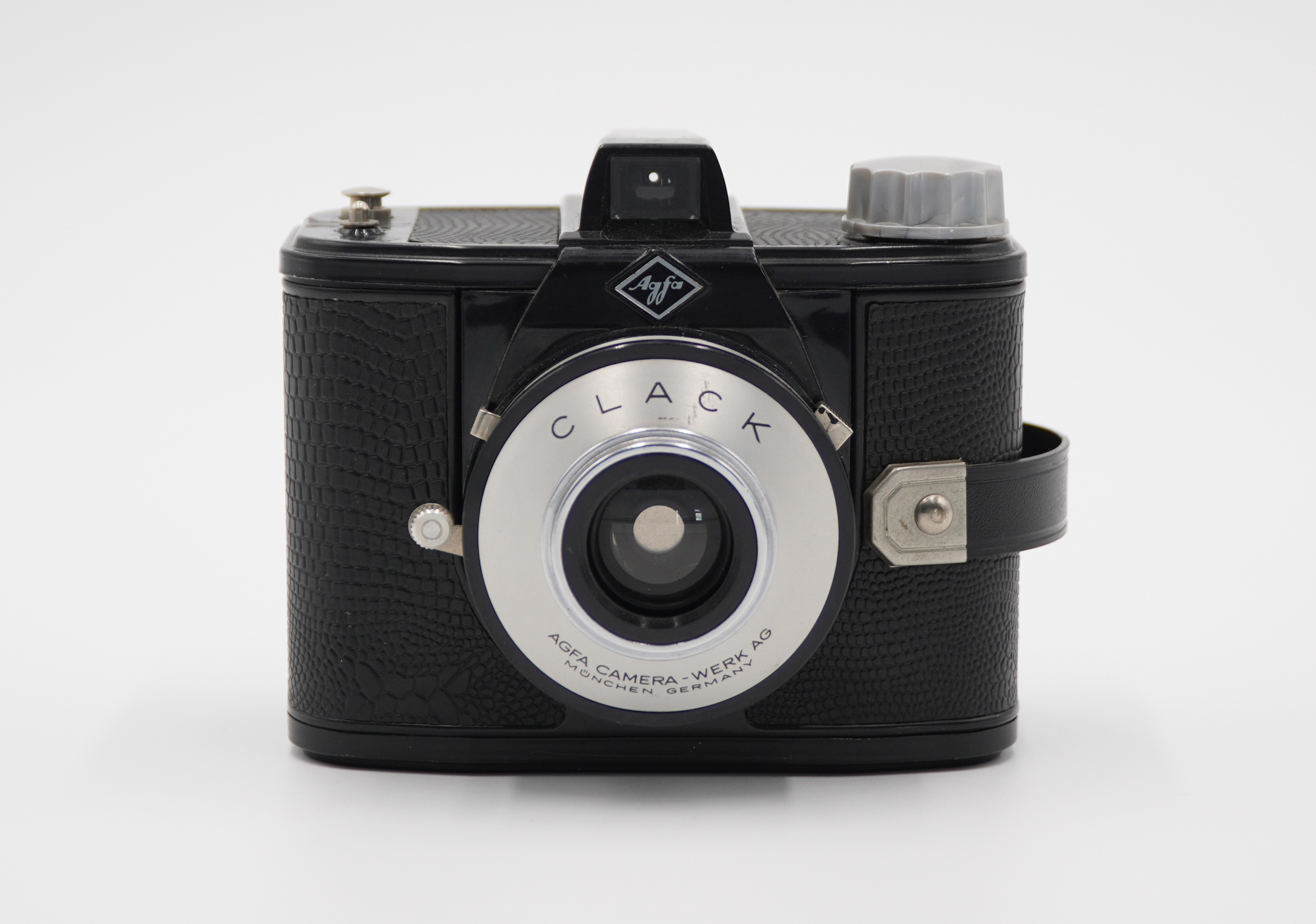
Agfa Clack front

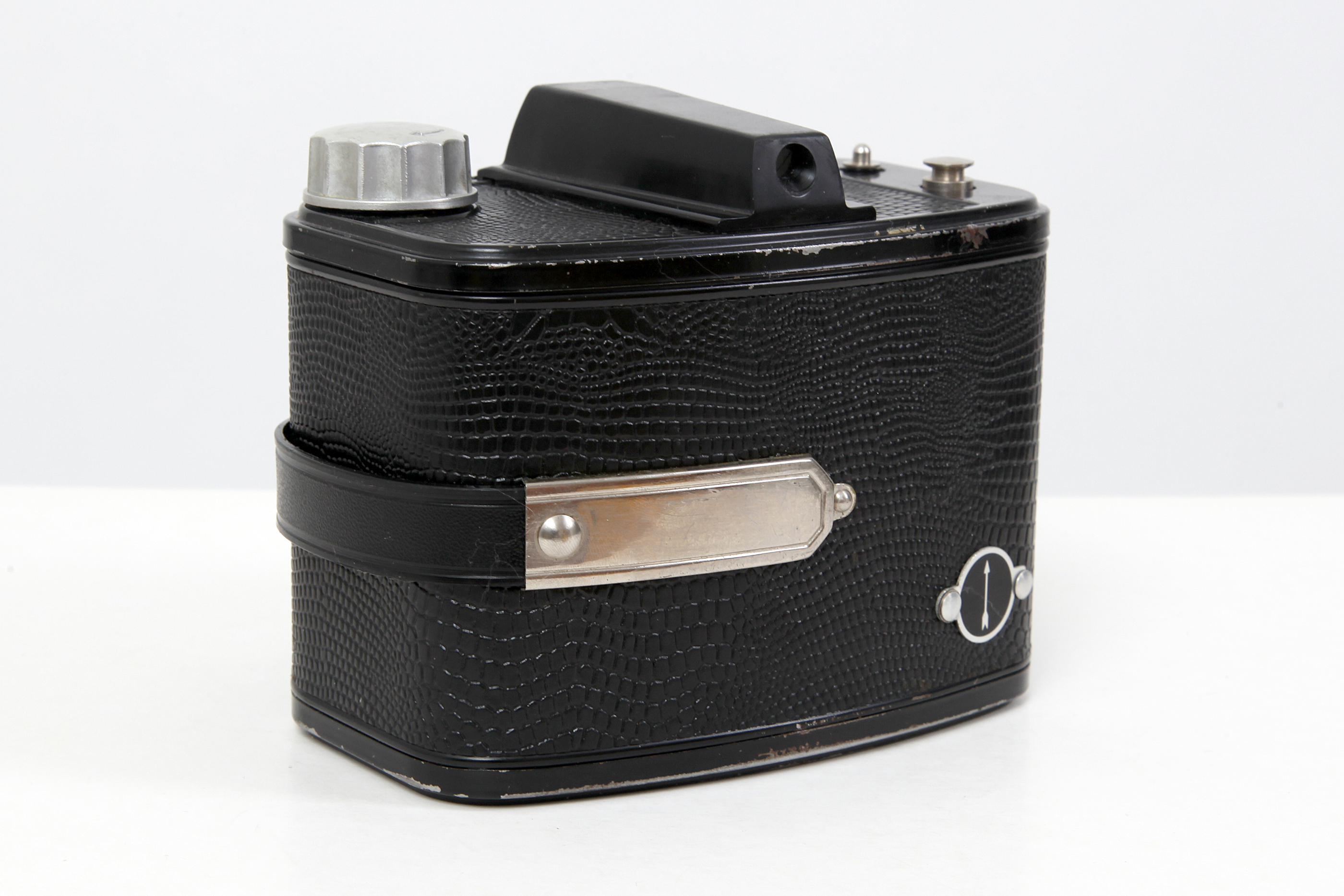
Agfa Clack back

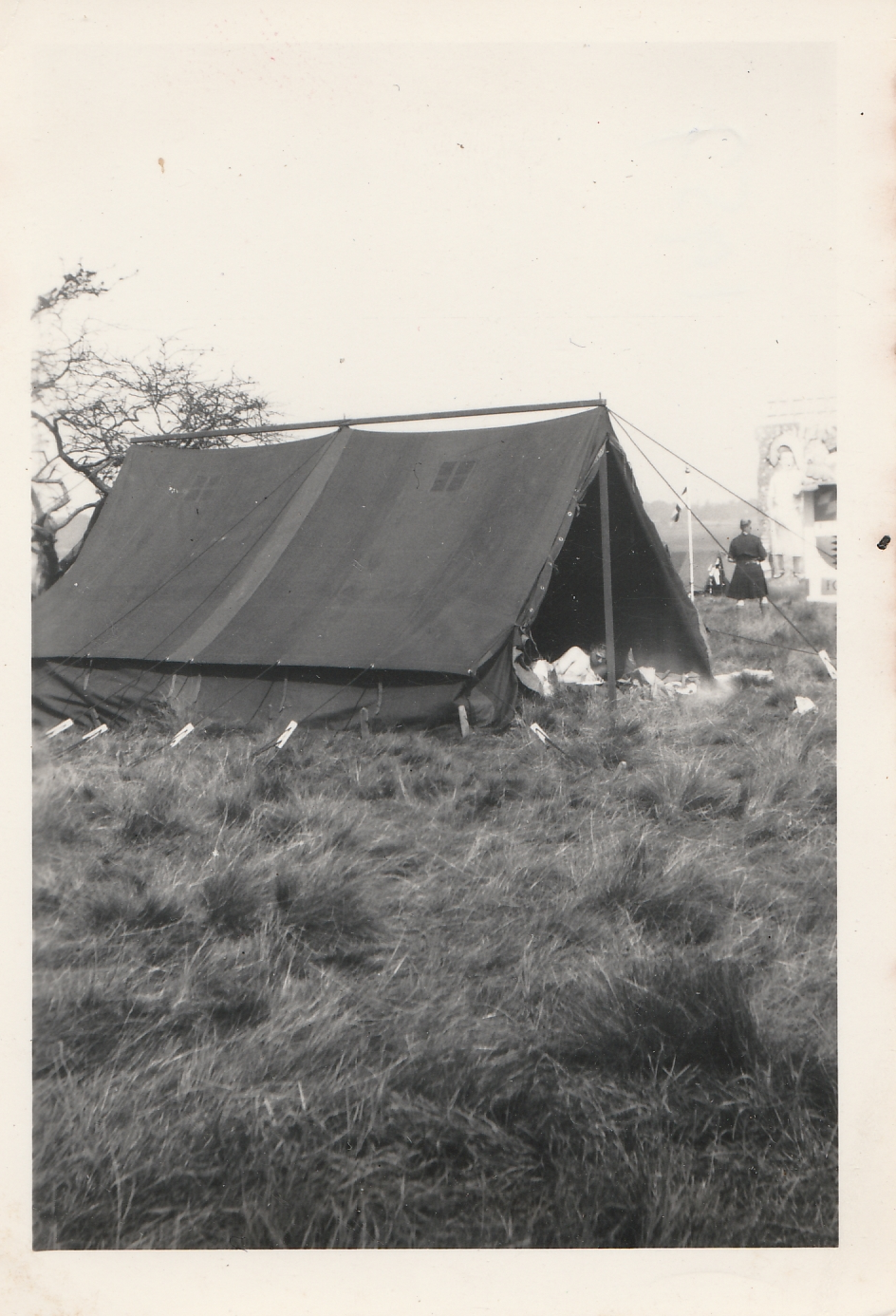
Photograph taken by an Agfa Clack at the 9th World Scout Jamboree, 1957
