= Agfa Optima 1535 Sensor =

German 35 mm rangefinder camera

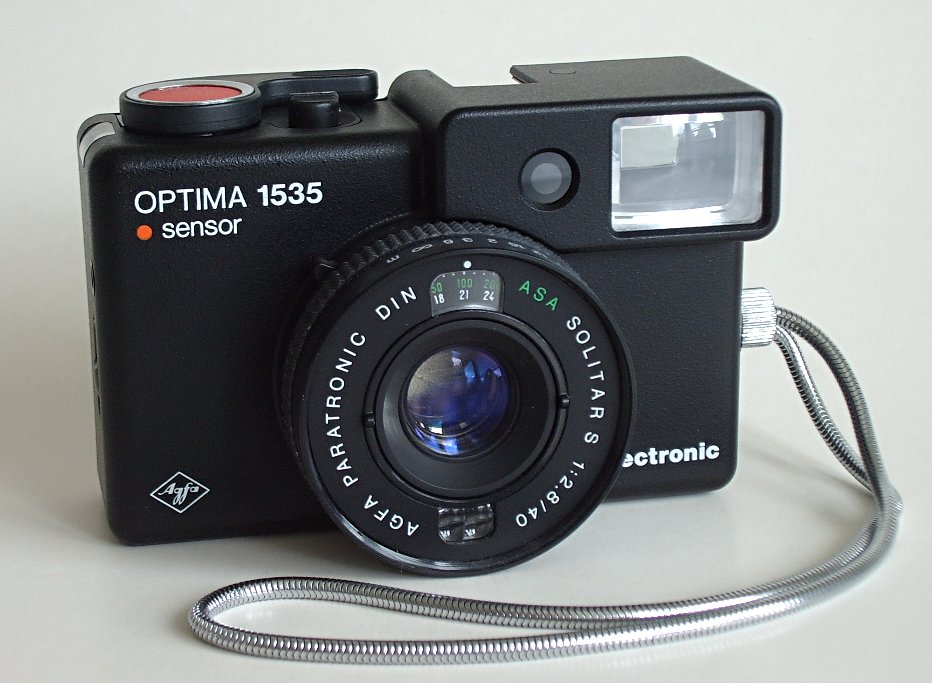

Overview
- Maker: Agfa-Gevaert
- Type: 35 mm rangefinder camera

Lens
- Lens mount: Agfa Solitar S f2.8/40, 4 elements in 3 groups

Focusing
- Focus: manual

Exposure/metering
- Exposure: full auto or manual aperture for flash photography

General
- Dimensions: 104 x 69 x 56 mm

The Agfa Optima 1535 Sensor is a 35 mm rangefinder camera manufactured by the German company Agfa in 1977.

It has the typical big finder of the Optima series, but on this special model it is combined with a superimposed coupled rangefinder. Shutter speed is controlled electronically by a CdS meter, with speeds from 15 sec. to 1/1000 sec. A special feature of the series is the film advance lever which can be switched to also rewind the film at its end.

== Specifications ==
- Lens: Agfa Solitar S 1:2.8/40mm, 4 lenses in 3 groups
- Focus: 0.9 m to infinity
- Shutter speed: ~15 – 1/1000 (electronic shutter)
- Aperture: 2.8 – 22
- Exposure mode: full auto
- Go/no-go green and red LED in viewfinder, as shutter speed indication
- Filter size: 49mm
- Film type: 135 film
- Film speed scale: ASA 25 – 500
- Battery: Three P625U
- Size: 104 × 69 × 56 mm
- Weight: 260 gram
- Self-timer: no
