= Agfa =

Belgian-German imaging company

Agfa-Gevaert N.V.

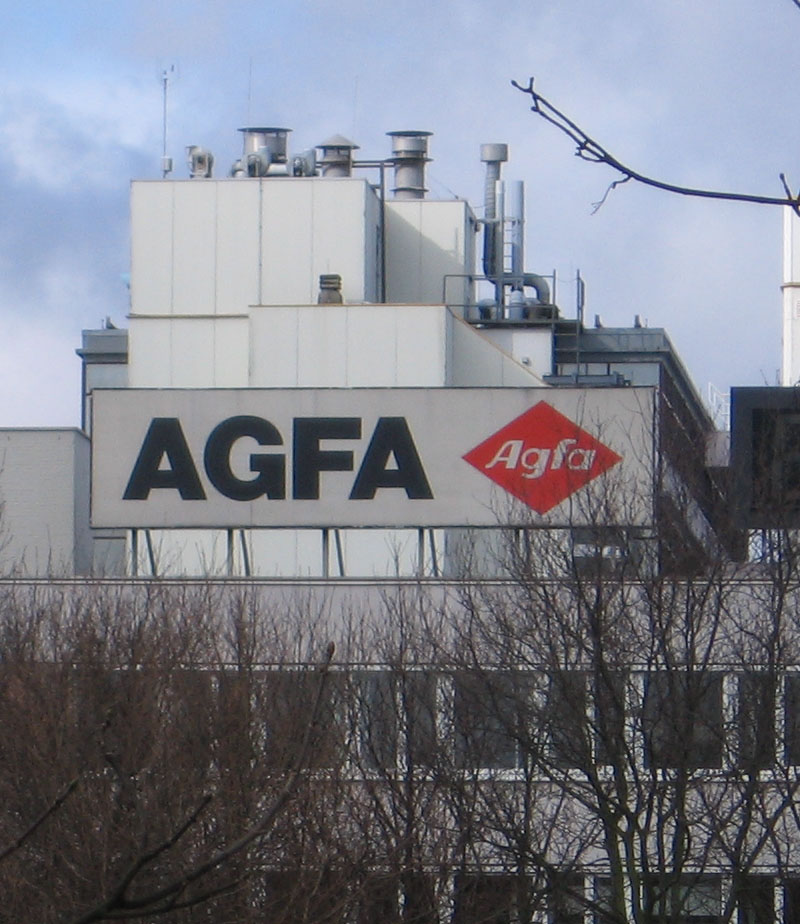
- Type: Naamloze vennootschap
- Traded as: Euronext Brussels: AGFB
- ISIN: BE0003755692
- Industry: Imaging and IT company
- Founded: 1867 (Aktiengesellschaft für Anilinfabrikation); 1894, Gevaert & Co. 1964 (Agfa-Gevaert)
- Headquarters: Mortsel, Belgium
- Key people: Pascal Juéry, CEO
- Revenue: € 1,1 billion (2024)
- Net income: -€ 92 million (2024)
- Number of employees: 4,586 (2024)
- Parent: IG Farben (1925–1952)
- Website: www.agfa.com

Agfa-Gevaert N.V. is a Belgian-German multinational corporation that develops, manufactures, and distributes analogue and digital imaging products, software, and systems. Its global headquarters are in Mortsel in Belgium.

The company began in 1867 near Berlin, as a dye manufacturer under the name Aktien-Gesellschaft für Anilin-Fabrikation (AGFA). One of its early creations was the Rodinal film developer. In 1925, the company merged with several other German chemical companies to become chemicals giant IG Farben. One of its most notable inventions was the Agfacolor-Neu color film strip in 1936. After the war, it based itself in Leverkusen. AGFA was reconstituted (as a subsidiary of Bayer) from the remnants of IG Farben in 1952. It merged with Gevaert Photo-Producten of Belgium in 1964. At its peak, Agfa was one of the big three giants of photographic film alongside Eastman Kodak and Fujifilm.

Agfa photographic film and cameras were once prominent consumer products. In 2004, the consumer imaging division was spun-off into an independent AgfaPhoto (which itself filed for bankruptcy after a year and now licenses its name to other companies). Ever since then, Agfa-Gevaert's commerce is 100% business-to-business.

== History ==
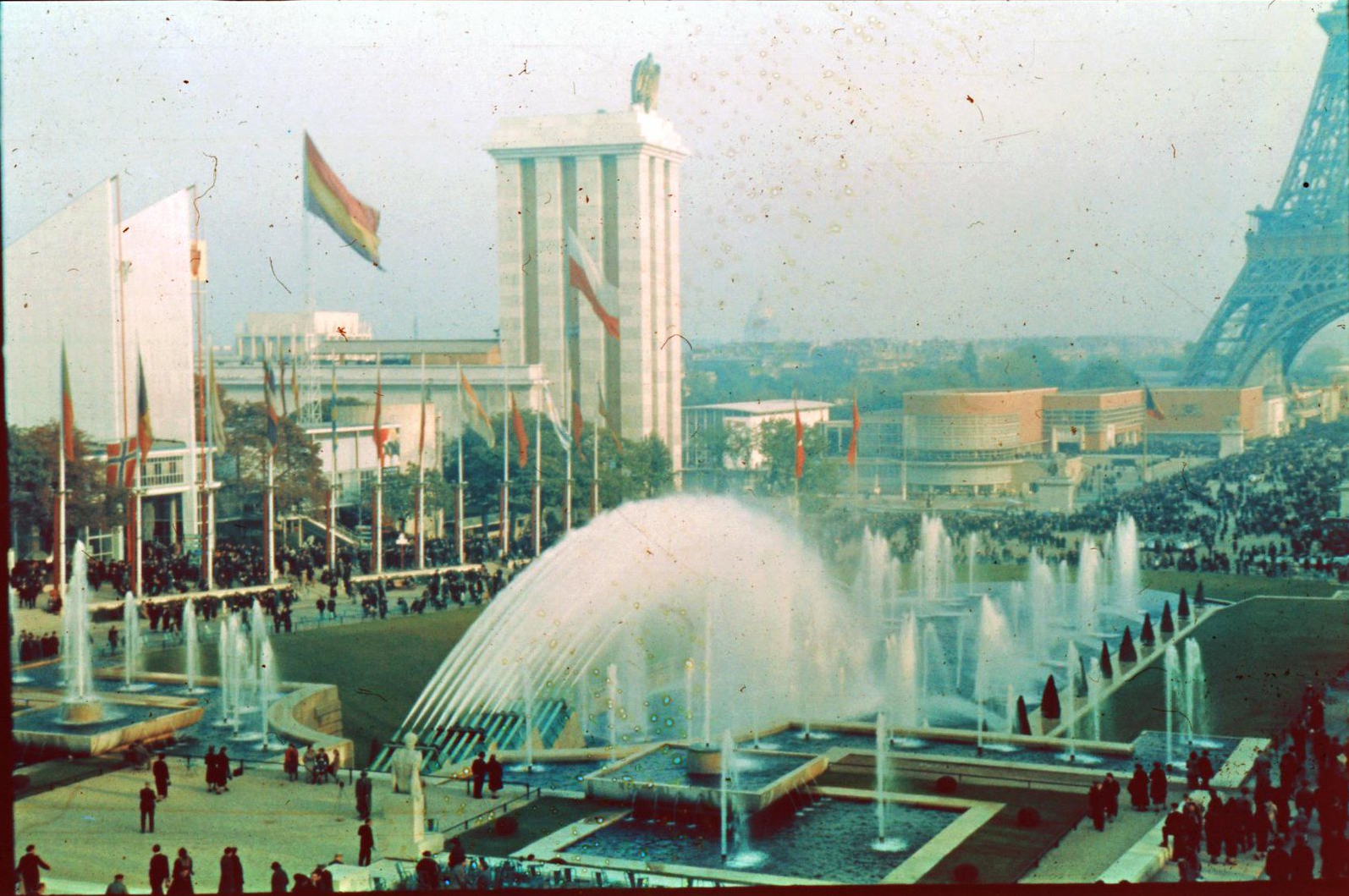
An Agfacolor slide dated 1937 from Paris, France

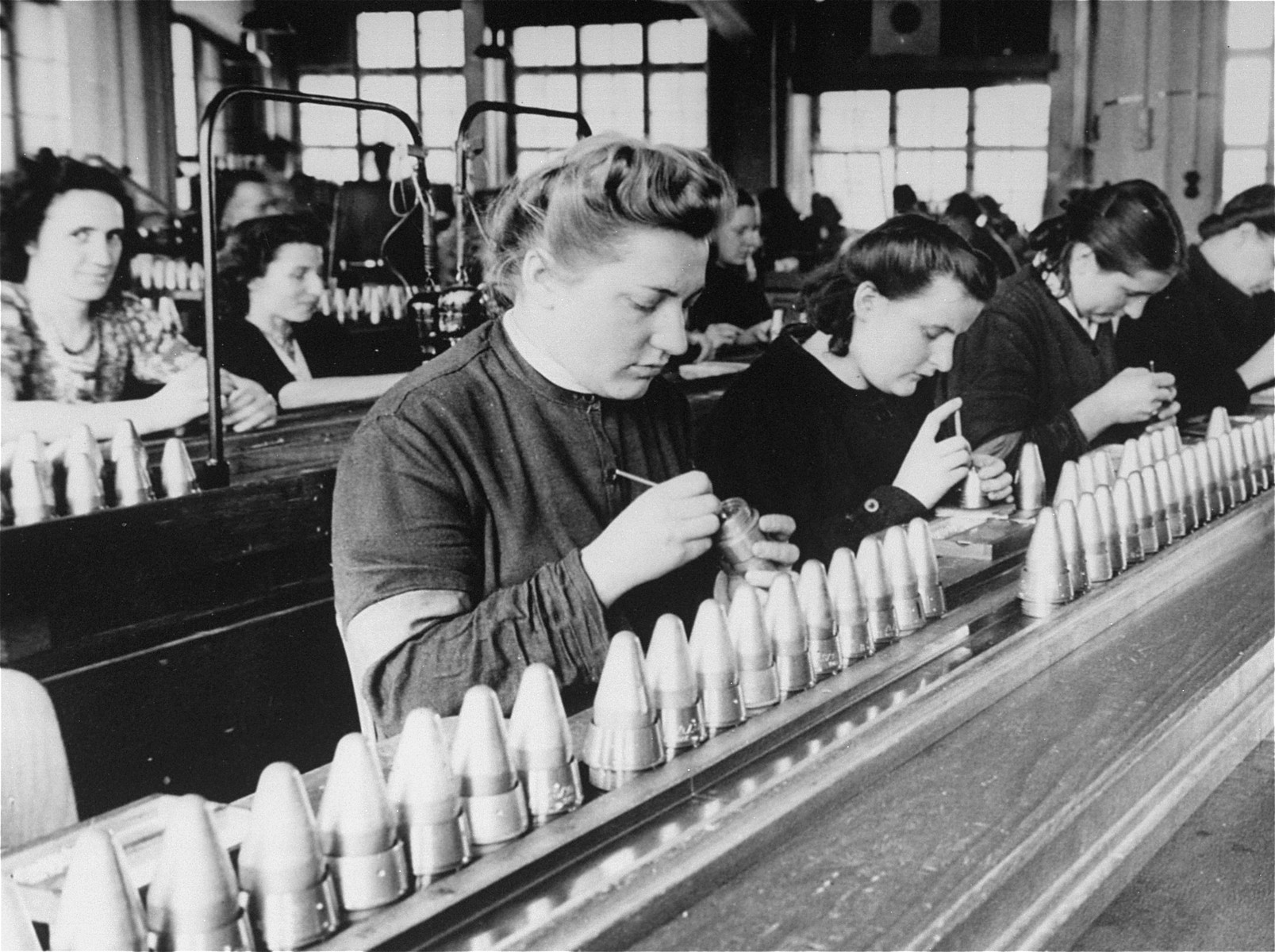
Production of bomb detonators by imprisoned foreign female workers from Stadelheim prison in a factory owned by the AGFA camera company during the Nazi regime, May 1943

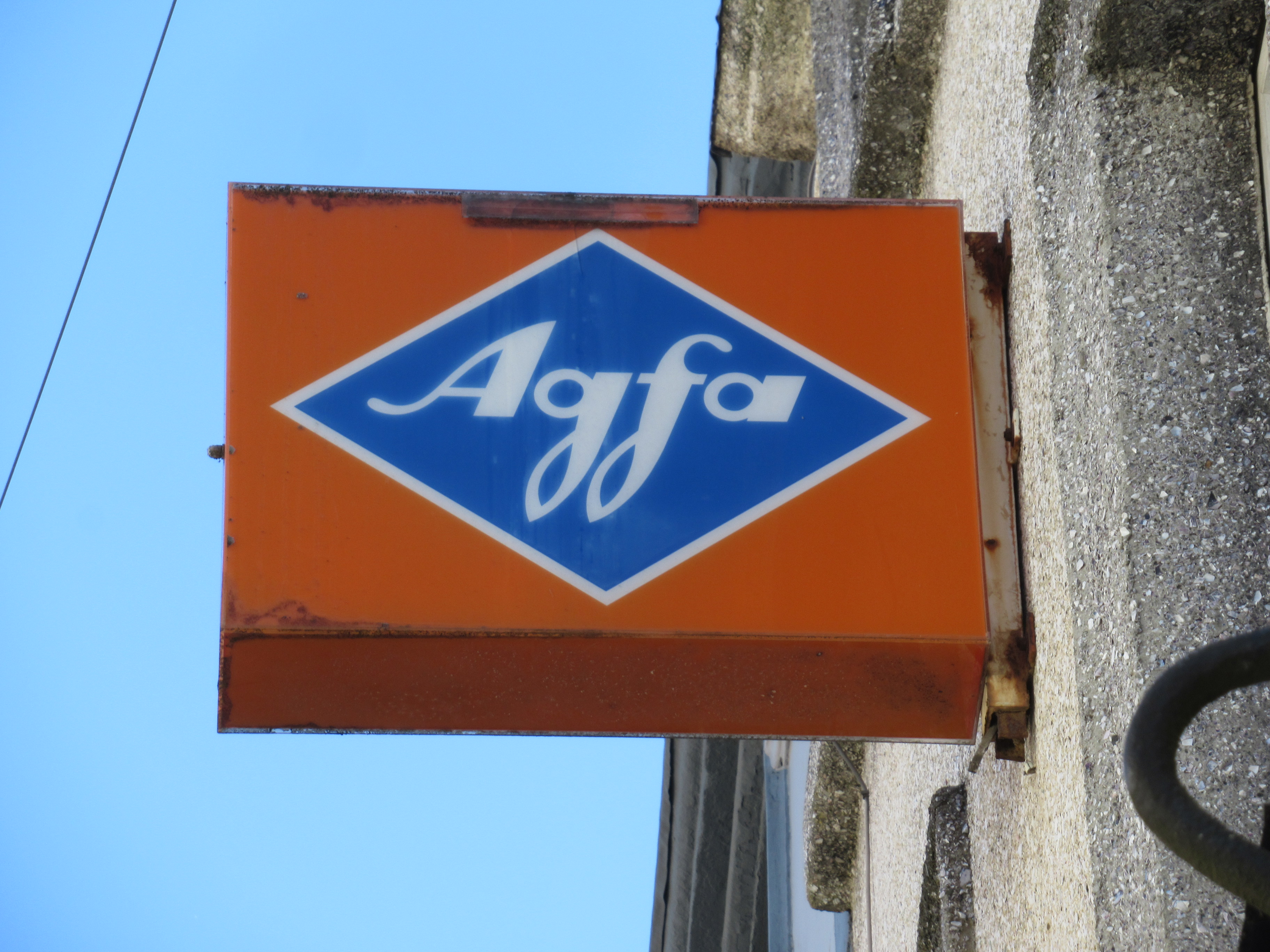
Former Agfa logo

=== Founding and early development (1867–1938) ===
The company Aktiengesellschaft für Anilinfabrikation (Joint-stock Company for Aniline Production) was founded in 1867, in Rummelsburg (now in the Lichtenberg borough of Berlin) as a manufacturer of dyes and stains. Its founders were Paul Mendelssohn Bartholdy, son of composer Felix Mendelssohn Bartholdy, and Carl Alexander von Martius. The company became a public limited company in 1873.

In 1894, L. Gevaert & Cie was founded in Antwerp, Belgium, arising from the photographic paper workshop of Lieven Gevaert. The Afga trademark was introduced in 1897, followed by X-ray plates and film products in 1898.

Agfa produced its first cinematographic film in 1903, and in 1925, became part of IG Farben, as part of the consolidation of the German chemical industry. Its photographic activities were combined with those of Bayer, including a camera factory in Munich. In 1928, Agfa acquired Ansco, an American photographic manufacturer, whose products were sold under the Agfa-Ansco brand name and in 1936, Agfa introduced Agfacolor Neu, a pioneering color film for amateurs and professionals.

=== Second World War and postwar period (1939–1981) ===
Between 1939 and 1945, Agfa used large numbers of forced labourers, including concentration camp prisoners in the Munich subcamp (Agfa Kamerawerke) of the Dachau concentration camp and in the Dutch transit camp Kamp Westerbork. Forced labourers were also used by Agfa AG in the "Agfa camp" subcamp of the Munich-Stadelheim juvenile prison between 1943 and 1945. Parts of Afga's management were indicted after the war in the I.G. Farben trial before an American military tribunal.

Agfacolor negative-positive color material was used for the first time in a feature film in 1940, Frauen sind doch bessere Diplomaten (Women make the best Diplomats) by the German UFA film studios. In 1941, Agfa's American assets were seized by the United States during World War II as enemy property and became General Aniline and Film Corp., whose photographic products reverted to the Ansco brand name. The following year, intensifying screen products were introduced.

In 1945, when the Allies broke up IG Farben to reduce the size of German chemical industry, Agfa reappeared as an independent business. An Agfa plant located in the region that later became East Germany formed the foundation of ORWO. Between 1945 and 1947, the company's chairman Carlo Gevaert, who also led the employers' organization Vlaams Economisch Verbond, left Belgium for the Belgian Congo, where he died in 1949. Agfa was then taken over by a group of businessmen led by John Meeus. These new business leaders were committed Leopoldists, with Meeus himself financing a Leopoldist congress in Brussels in 1947.

In 1952, Agfa was re-established as a wholly owned subsidiary of Bayer in Leverkusen and in 1964, Agfa AG merged with Gevaert Photo-Producten N.V., with Bayer AG and Gevaert each holding a 50% interest in the new operating company. Agfacontour Professional Sheet Film was introduced in 1970, followed by mammography film and screen products in 1972. In 1981, Bayer bought out Gevaert, becoming the sole owner.

=== Expansion and acquisitions (1988–2009) ===
In 1988, Agfa acquired Compugraphic Corporation, a manufacturer of prepress systems and two years later, the company sold its magnetic tape business and introduced Computed Radiography (CR) products. This was then followed by the introduction of PACS products in 1994, and the acquisition of Hoechst's printing plate and proofing business in 1996. The following year, Agfa launched Apogee Prepress, the first prepress workflow to use PDF as a production file format. The company also sold its film recorder division to German firm CCG Digital Image Technology.

In 1998, Agfa acquired DuPont's offset printing and graphic arts film business, CEA AB (X-ray film products) and Monotype Typography Inc. The company also sold its Copier Systems business to Lanier Worldwide Inc the same year. In 1999, Agfa acquired Sterling Diagnostic Imaging (X-ray film and equipment) and separated from Bayer. An initial public offering of Agfa-Gevaert shares took place on 1 June 1999, with the company listed on the Brussels and Frankfurt stock exchanges.

At the start of the new millennium, Agfa acquired Krautkramer, a producer of ultrasonic systems for non-destructive testing, and Quadrat, a Ghent-based European producer of radiology information systems in 2000. The following year, it acquired Autologic, an American producer of systems for prepress automation; Talk Technology, a producer of medical voice recognition systems; and the German company Seifert and the American company Pantak, both producers of industrial X-ray equipment for non-destructive testing. Agfa also acquired a minority interest in MediVision, a developer and manufacturer of digital imaging systems for ophthalmology. In September 2001, Agfa discontinued its desktop scanner and digital camera business and ceased providing support for these products.

Agfa acquired Mitra Imaging Inc., a developer of medical imaging and information systems for healthcare, in 2002, while Bayer sold its remaining 30% stake in the company. The following year, Agfs opened a new printing plate factory in Wuxi, China, and sold its non-destructive testing business to General Electric.

Agfa made several acquisitions in 2004, including Dotrix, a Belgian producer of digital colour printing systems for industrial applications, and Lastra, an Italian manufacturer of plates, chemicals and equipment for the offset printing industry. It also acquired ProImage, an Israeli developer of browser-based digital workflow solutions for the newspaper and printing industries, and Symphonie On Line, a French information technology company specialising in electronic patient record systems. That year, Agfa sold its consumer imaging division to a company formed through a management buyout, named AgfaPhoto and held by an investment company. AgfaPhoto filed for bankruptcy the following year. Agfa also sold Agfa Monotype Corporation, a provider of fonts and related software, to Boston-based private equity firm TA Associates.

In 2005, Agfa acquired GWI, a German developer of healthcare information systems for medical records, nursing, business management, and facility administration; Heartlab, Inc., a US developer of cardiology image and information management systems; and Med2Rad, an Italian developer of radiology information systems. The company also introduced industrial inkjet products that year. The next developments recorded in the company's history were in 2009, when Agfa acquired Insight Agents, a European developer and producer of contrast media, and Gandi Innovations, a producer of large-format inkjet systems.

=== Recent history (2010–present) ===
In 2010, Agfa Graphics and Shenzhen Brothers established the Agfa Graphics Asia joint venture to strengthen their position in Greater China and the ASEAN region. Agfa also acquired the Harold M. Pitman Company, a US supplier of products and systems for the graphic industry. The following year, it acquired WPD, a Brazilian supplier of healthcare IT systems. Eleven years later, in 2022, Agfa announced the sale of its Offset Solutions division to the German investment company Aurelius Group. The sale was completed in 2023, when the division was renamed ECO3.

== Company structure ==
Agfa is headquartered in Mortsel, Belgium, with sales organisations in 40 countries. In countries where Agfa does not have its own sales organisation, the market is served by a network of agents and representatives. At the end of 2011, the company had 11,728 employees (full-time equivalent permanent) worldwide. Agfa has manufacturing plants around the world. The largest production and research centres are based in Belgium, the United States, Canada, Germany, France, Italy and China. Net sales for 2011 totalled 3,023 million euros.

Since January 1, 2019, two new entities emerged within the Agfa-Gevaert Group: Agfa HealthCare (ITCo) and Agfa (MainCo). Agfa HealthCare groups all IT-related activities of the former Agfa HealthCare business group. The newer Agfa includes the activities of the former Agfa Graphics and Agfa Specialty Products business groups, as well as the Imaging activities of the former Agfa HealthCare business group.

=== Agfa Healthcare ===
Agfa Healthcare is a developer of medical imaging information systems, with main offices in Mortsel (Belgium), Leeds (United Kingdom), Ghent (Belgium), Waterloo (Ontario, Canada), Shanghai (China) and Vienna (Austria).

=== Agfa division business groups ===
The activities of the Agfa division have been subdivided into three groups: Offset Solutions (the prepress business of the former Agfa Graphics business group), Digital Print & Chemicals (the inkjet business of the former Agfa Graphics business group and the activities of the former Agfa Specialty Products business group) and Radiology Solutions (the imaging activities of the former Agfa HealthCare business group).

== Products ==
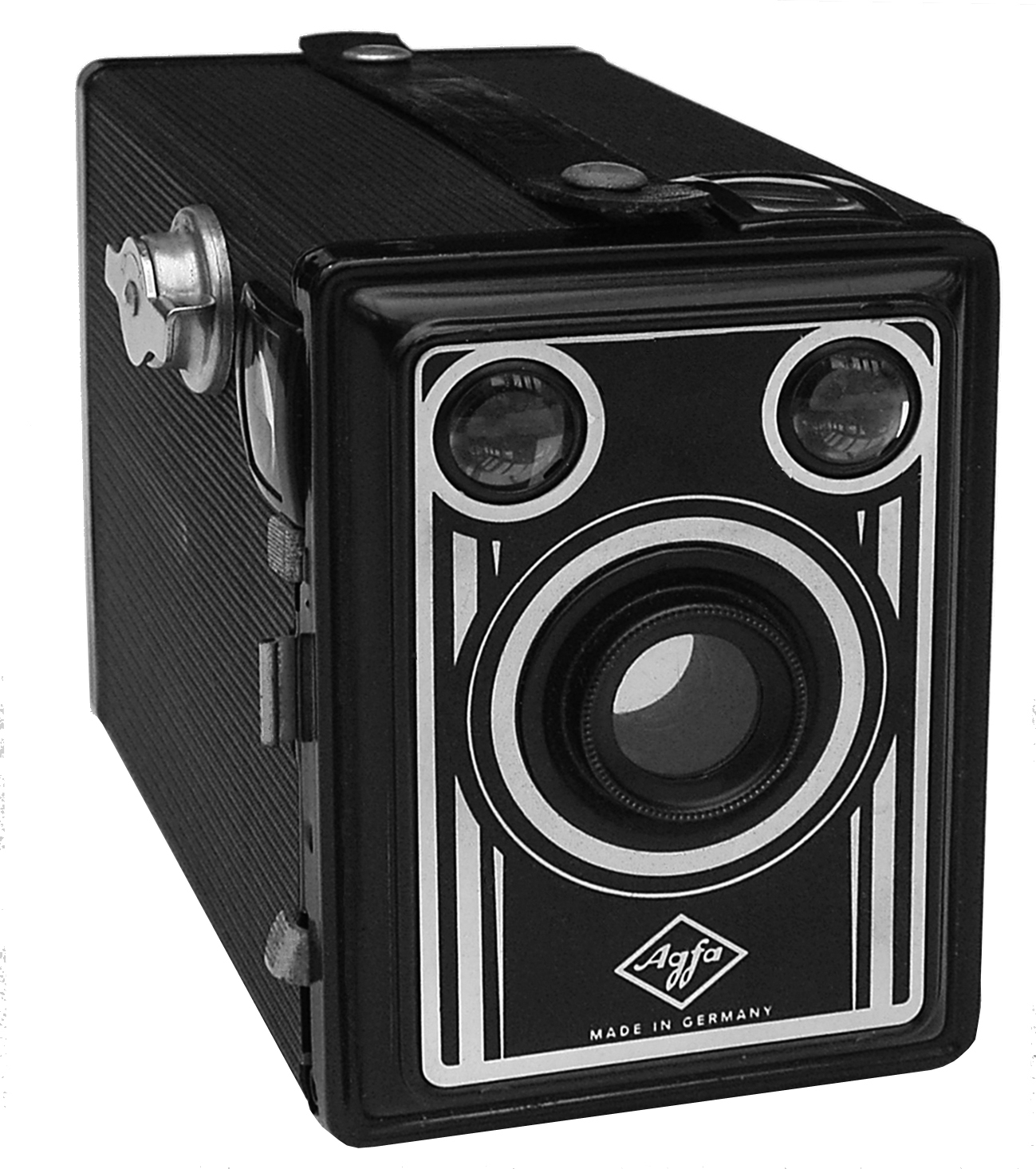
Agfa Box 50 (ca.1949)

In 2004, Agfa withdrew from the consumer market, including photographic film, cameras and other photographic equipment, transferring rights to the new company Agfaphoto, formed by the consumer photo division's management.

While Agfa withdrew from the consumer market, the industrial branch of Agfa continues to produce black & white, colour negative, and colour reversal films for aerial photography. Because Agfa still produces these photographic films for the aerial market, it is still possible to buy fresh, Agfa-produced photographic films for use in consumer cameras. They are sold by the Lomography Society and Rollei, which purchase the aerial photography film in bulk from Agfa, and then cut and package it into consumer photographic formats.

By contrast, Agfaphoto-branded photographic films, sold by Lupus Imaging Medua which licenses the Agfaphoto trademark, are not made by Agfa at all. Lupus originally contracted manufacture with the now-closed Ferrania plant in Italy. Agfaphoto films are now produced by Fujifilm in Japan for Lupus.

=== Agfa cameras ===
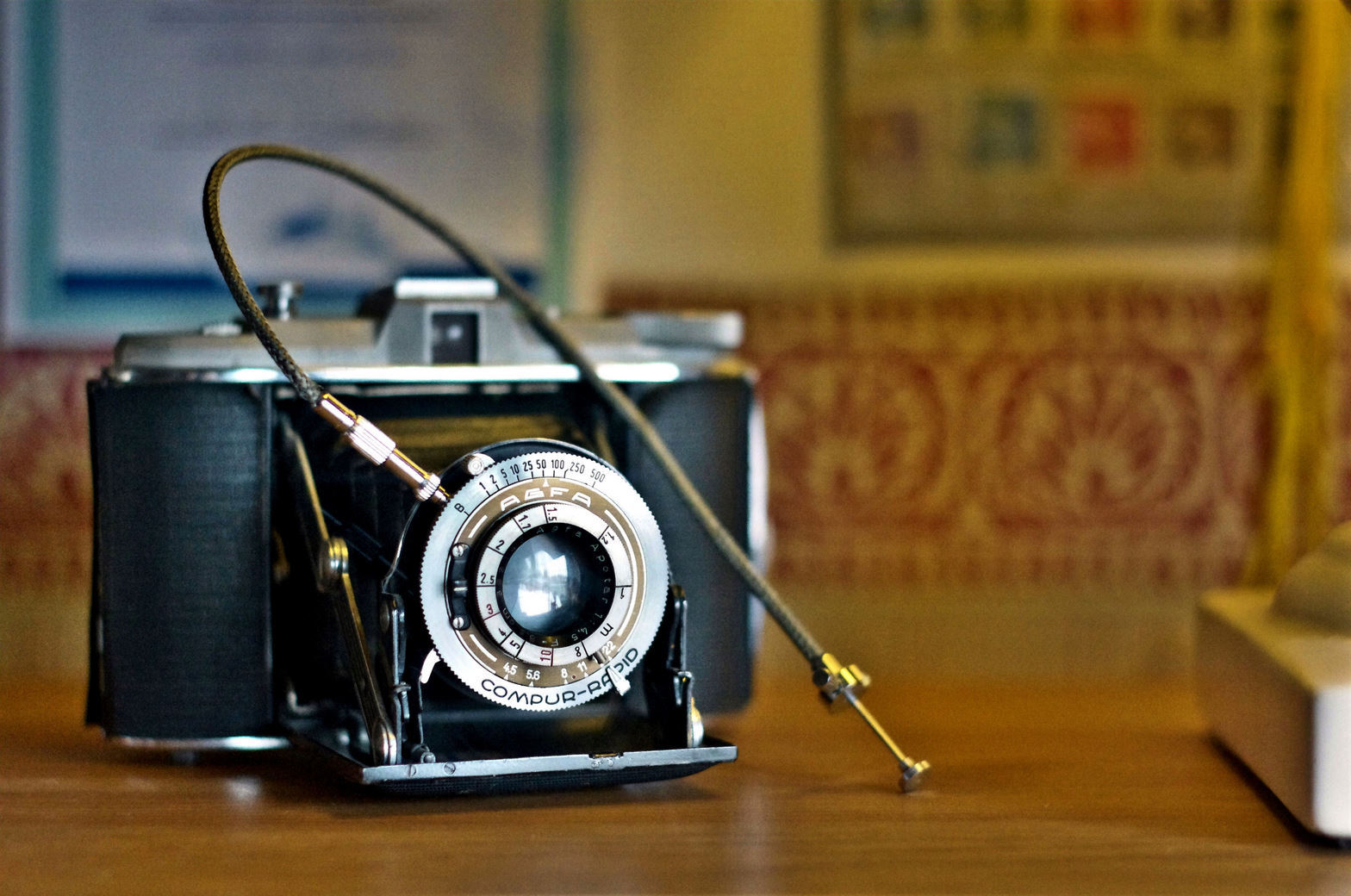
Agfa Compur-Rapid

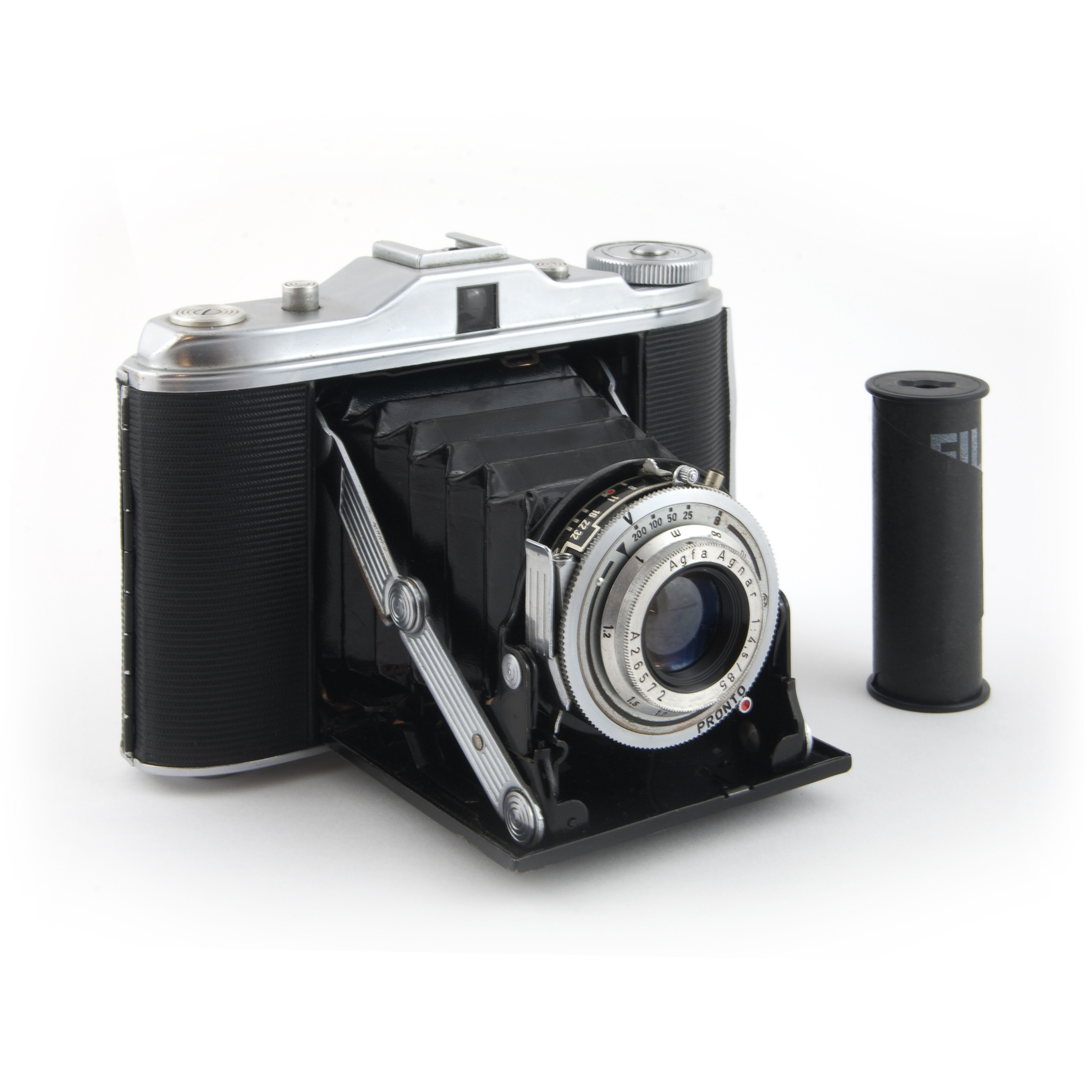
Agfa Isolette

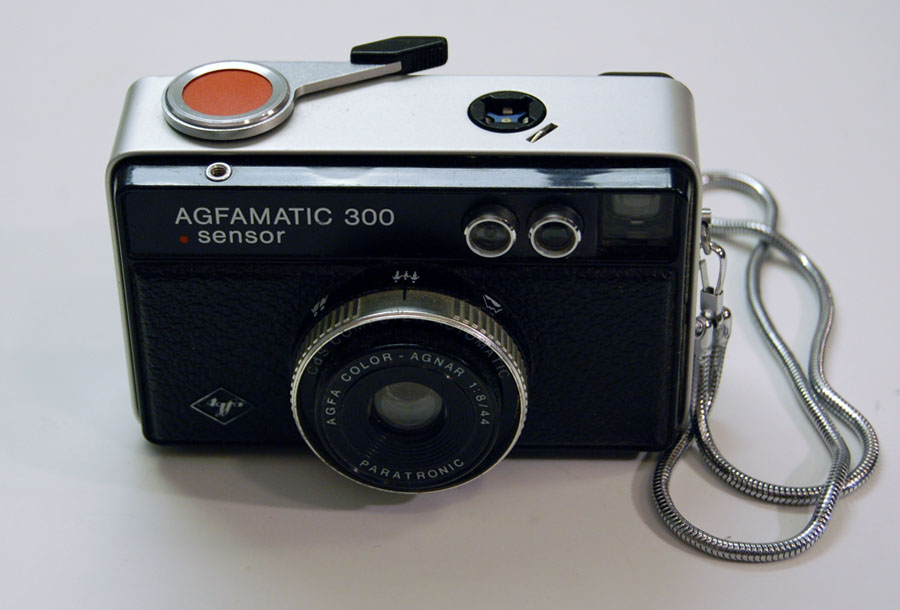
Agfa Agfamatic 300 Sensor

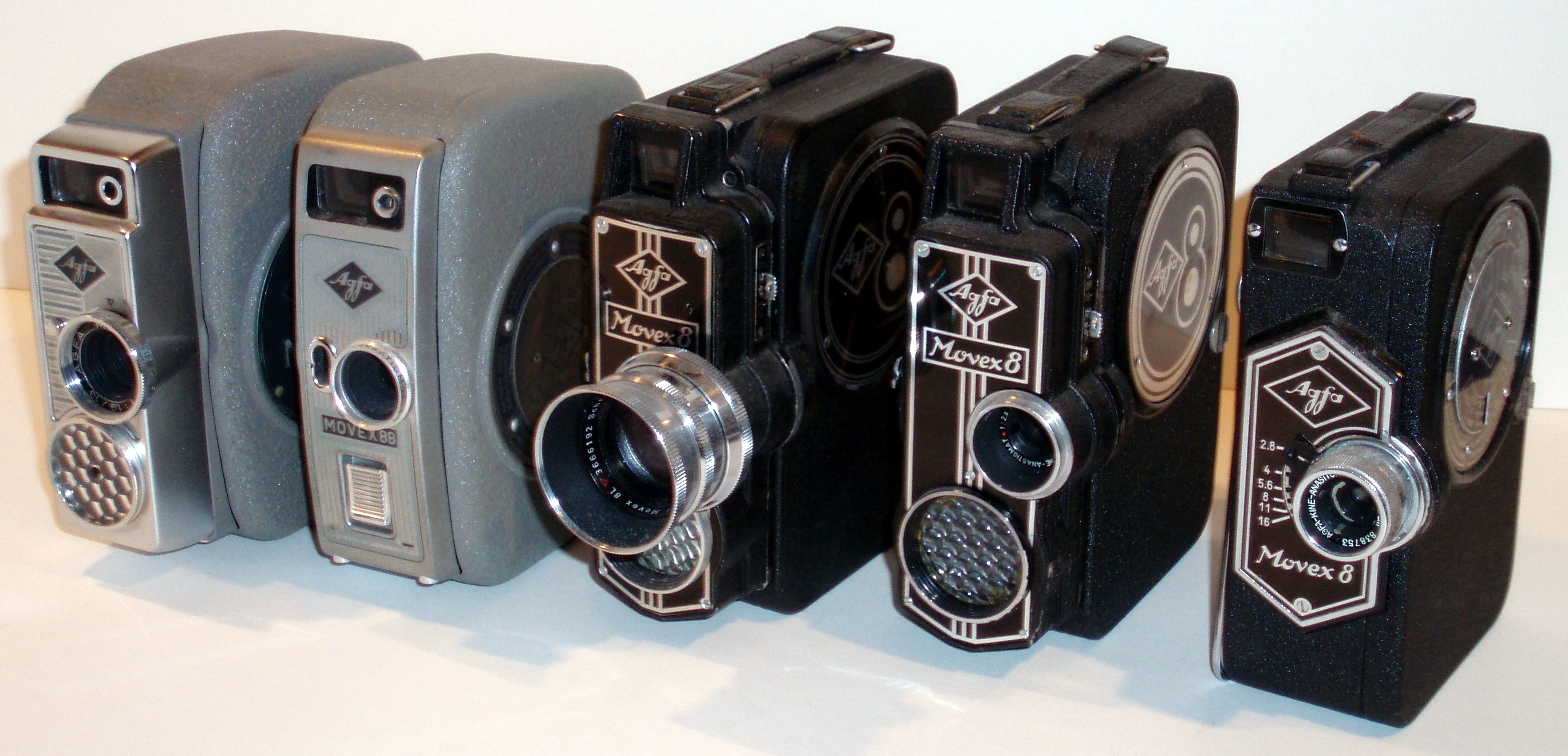
Various Agfa Movex 8 mm home movie cameras

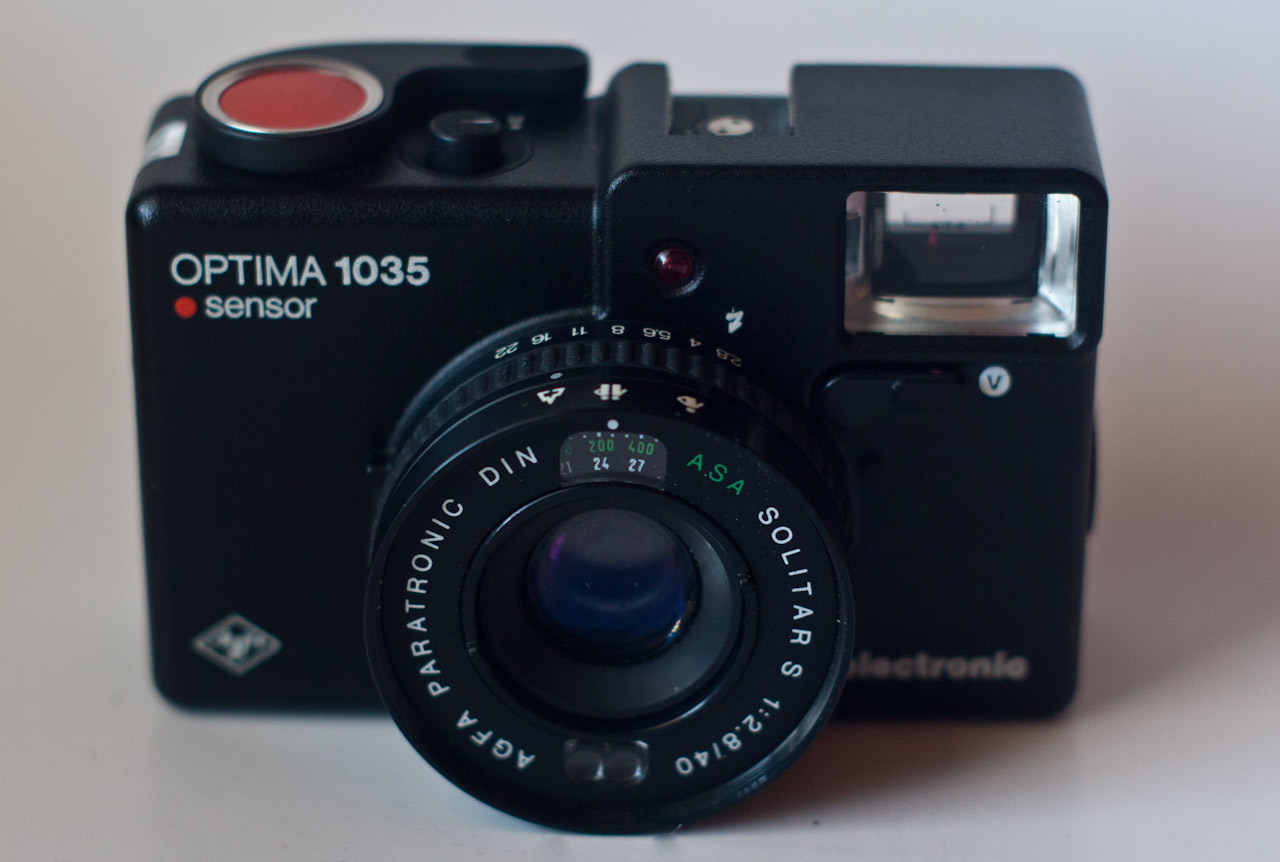
Agfa Optima 1035 Sensor

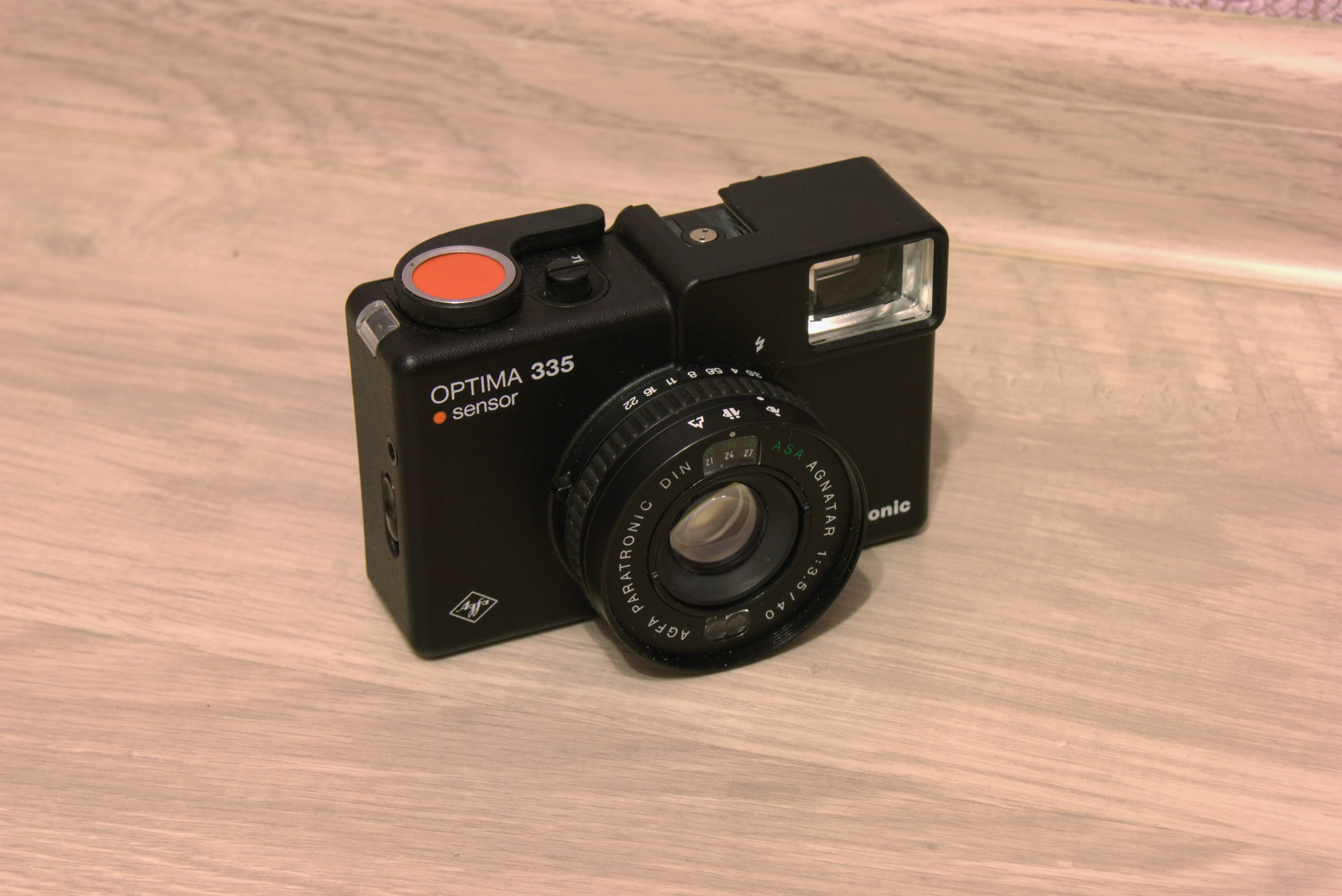
AGFA Optima 335 Sensor

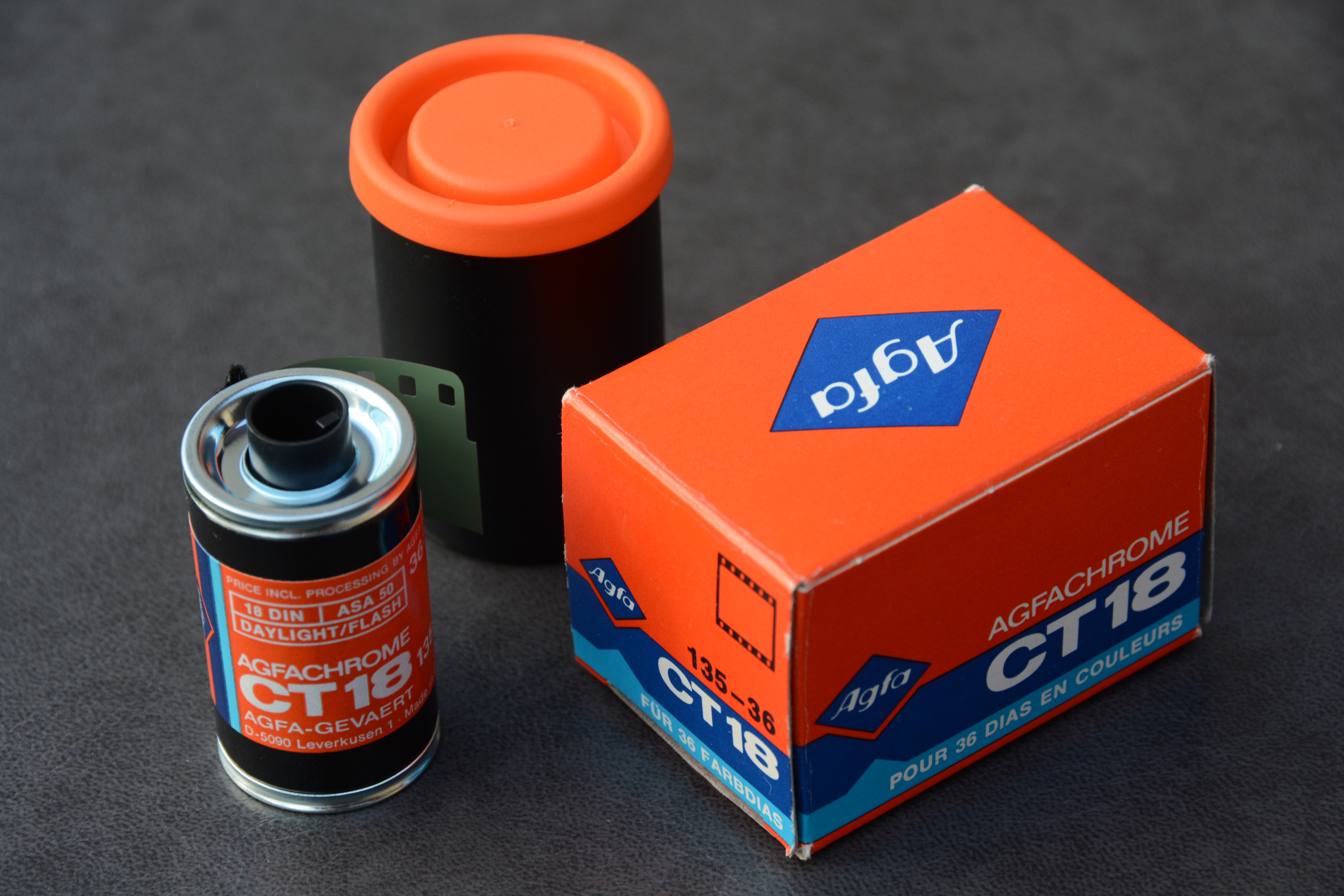
Agfachrome CT18 colour slide film, with packaging (1981)

Agfa produced a range of cameras which included:

- Ambiflex
- Silette series
- Clipper
- Billy
- Record
- Iso series
- Isolette
- Isola series
- Click
- Clack
- Optima series, e.g. Optima 1A
- Optima Sensor series, e.g. Optima 1535 Sensor and Optima Flash Sensor
- Selectronic S series
- Agfamatic series
- Agfamatic Pocket series
- Agfa Mini
- matching accessories, such as flashguns

==== SLR ====
- Agfa Flexilette
- Selectronic series (rebranded products of Chinon)

=== Agfa slide projectors ===
Including, roughly in chronological order:

- Agfa Opticus 100
- Agfa Agfacolor 50 automatic
- Agfa Diamator series, like models H, m, 1500

=== Agfa consumer and professional films ===
Black & white films:

- Agfa PD16
- Agfapan 25, 100 and 400
- Agfapan APX 25, 100 and 400
- Isopan ISS (Super Special)
- Isopan F (Fine Grain)
- Isopan Ultra
- Isopan Record
- Agfa Vario-XL (C-41 process chromogenic film)
- Dia-Direct (reversal film)
- Scala (reversal film)
- Agfacontour Professional film

Colour reversal (slide) films:

- Agfacolor Neu
- Agfachrome CT 18 and CT 21
- Agfachrome series
- Agfachrome R 100 S
- Agfachrome 50 S and 50 L Professional
- Agfachrome RS and RS Plus Professional series
- Agfachrome RSX and RSX II Professional series
- Agfachrome CT, CTx and CT Precisa series (excluding New Agfaphoto CT Precisa 100)

Colour negative films:

- Agfacolor CN14, CN17, CN17M, CN17 Special, CNS and CNS2
- Agfacolor series
- Agfacolor XR series
- Agfacolor XRG series
- Agfacolor XRS Professional series
- Agfacolor Optima, Optima II and New Optima Professional series
- Agfacolor Portrait 160 Professional
- Agfacolor Ultra 50 Professional and Ultra 100
- Agfacolor Vista series (excluding New Agfaphoto Vista 200)

=== Scanners ===
Agfa produced many image scanners in the Arcus, DuoScan, SnapScan, StudioScan and StudioStar ranges. While they have all been discontinued and up-to-date drivers for them are not available from Agfa, Vuescan software supports many Agfa scanners on current computer operating systems.

=== Agfa darkroom equipment ===
- Agfa Varioscop enlargers
- Agfa Variomat print easels for automatic exposure
- Darkroom safety lights
- Agfa Rondinax and Rondix daylight developing tanks

=== Agfa papers ===
Agfa photographic papers were of very high quality; lines included:

- Brovira
- Portriga Rapid
- Lupex

The production of material identical to the last generation of fibre-based and resin-coated photographic Agfa Multigrade papers has been resumed by Adox.

=== Agfa magnetic tape ===
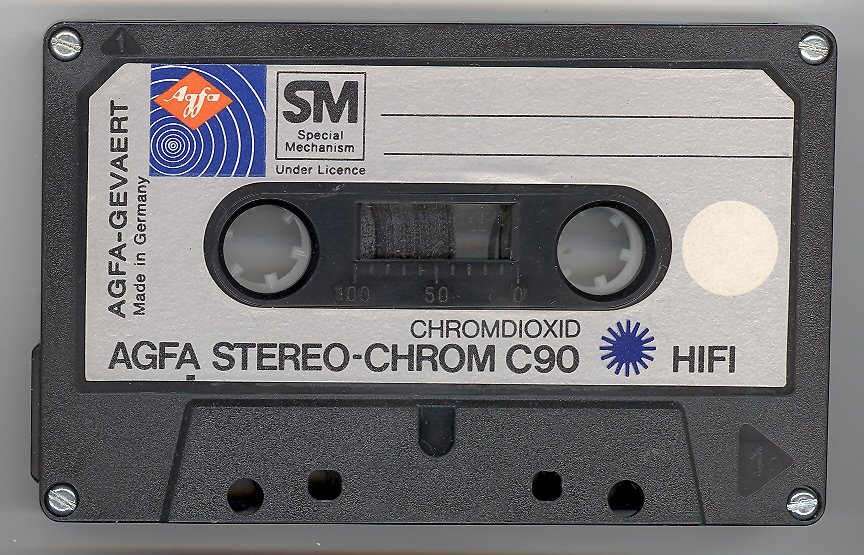
Agfa Stereo Chrom C 90 blank audio cassette

Agfa designed and released compact audio cassettes and its own tape formulations. Lines included:

- Low Noise / Low Noise Super / Low Noise Extra
- Ferro (Ferrocolor, Super Ferro Dynamic, F-X)
- Chrom (Stereo-Chrom, Super-Chrom, CrX)
- Carat

Agfa has also made videocassettes in the VHS, Betamax and Video 2000 formats. Agfa-Gevaert sold its magnetic tape division to BASF in 1991.

=== Agfa digital cameras ===
- Agfa StudioCam (1995) (professional digital camera, first ever to be produced and sold in quantity)
- Agfa ActionCam (1995) (Professional/prosumer DSLR)
- Agfa ePhoto 1280 (1997) (0.7 megapixel (MP), used SmartMedia)
- Agfa ePhoto 1680 (1998, (1.2 MP)
- Agfa ePhoto CL50 (1999, (1.2 MP)
- Agfa ePhoto CL30 (1999, 0.9 MP, used CompactFlash)
- Agfa ePhoto CL30 Clik! (1999, 0.9 MP, uses Iomega Clik! (later renamed PocketZip) disks as memory card)
- Agfa ePhoto CL18 (2000, 0.3 MP)
- Agfa ePhoto CL45 (2001, 0.7 MP)
- Agfa ePhoto CL20 (2000, 0.8 MP)
- Agfa ePhoto CL34 (2000, 1.3 MP)
- Agfa ePhoto 307
- Agfa ePhoto 780
- Agfa ePhoto 780c
- Agfa ePhoto Smile (0.3 mp)
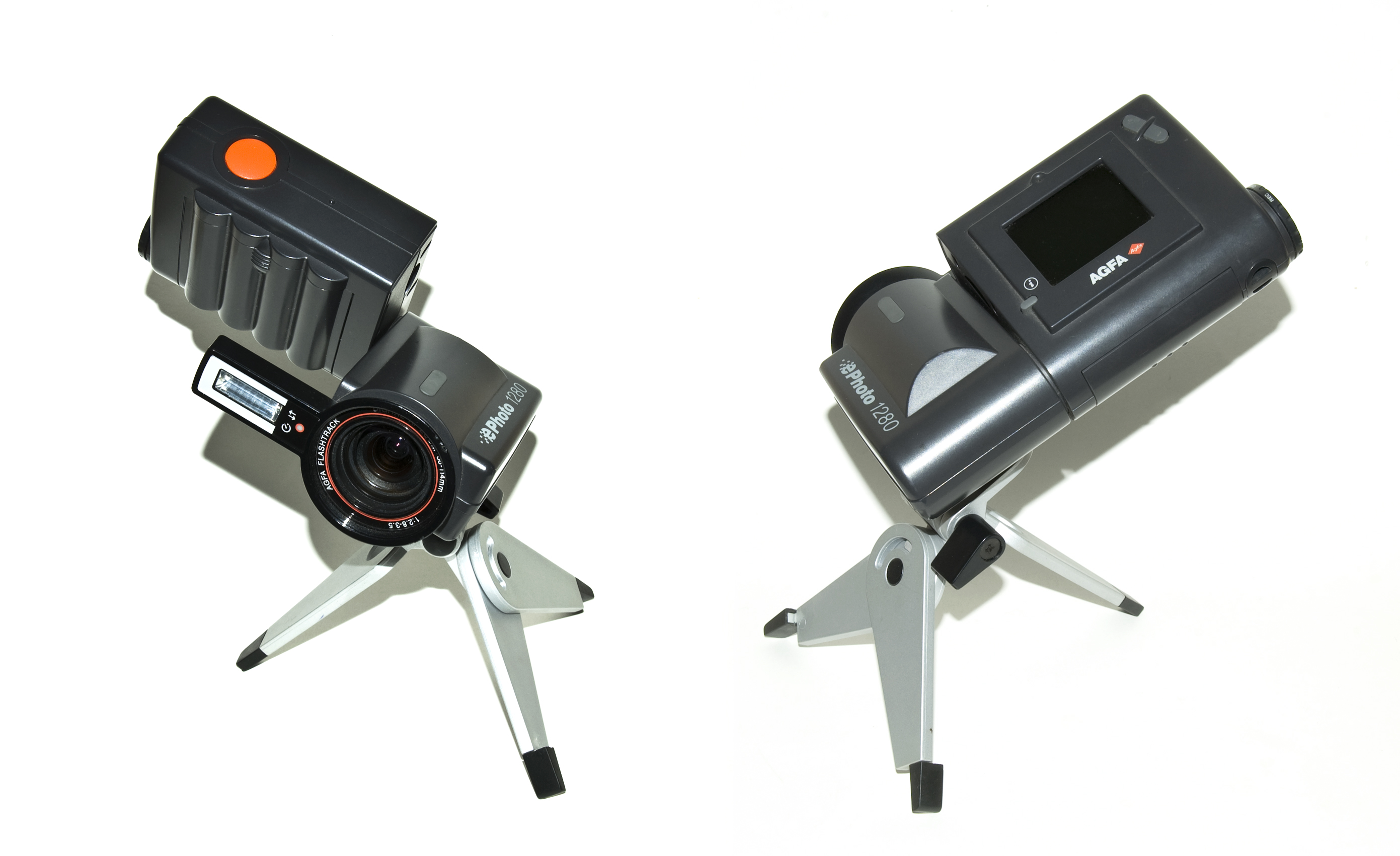
Agfa ePhoto 1280

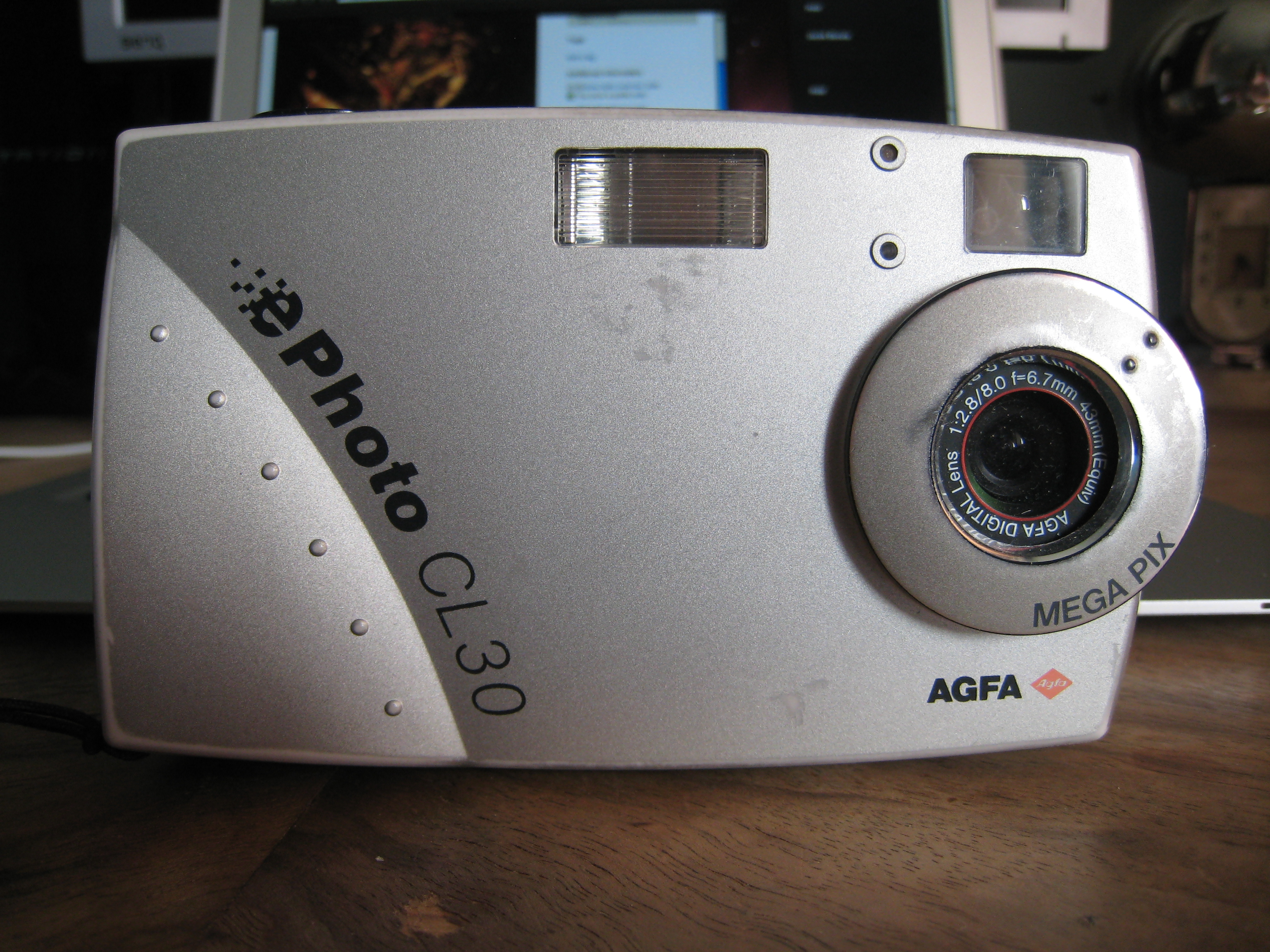
Agfa ePhoto CL30

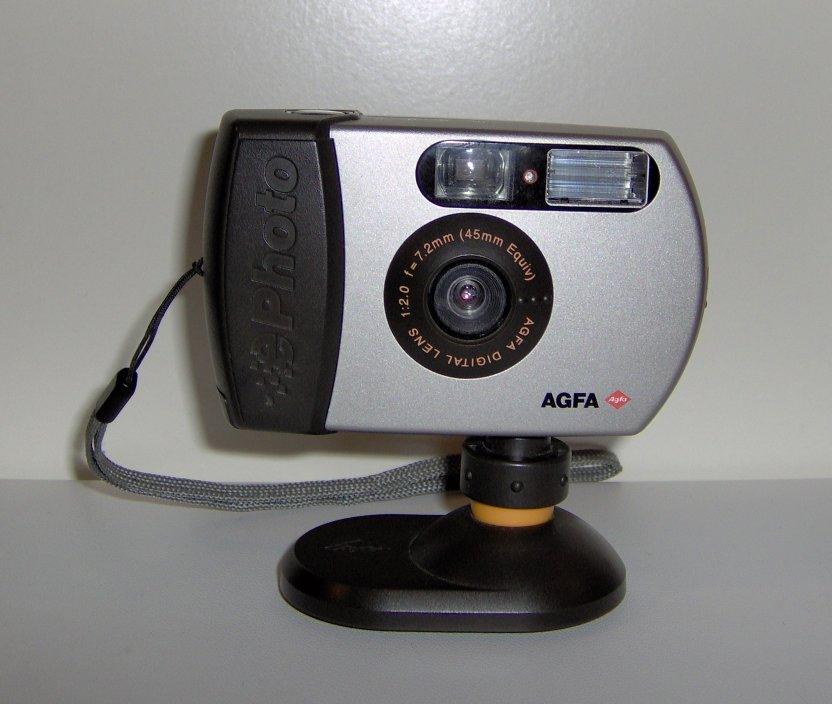
Agfa ePhoto CL18

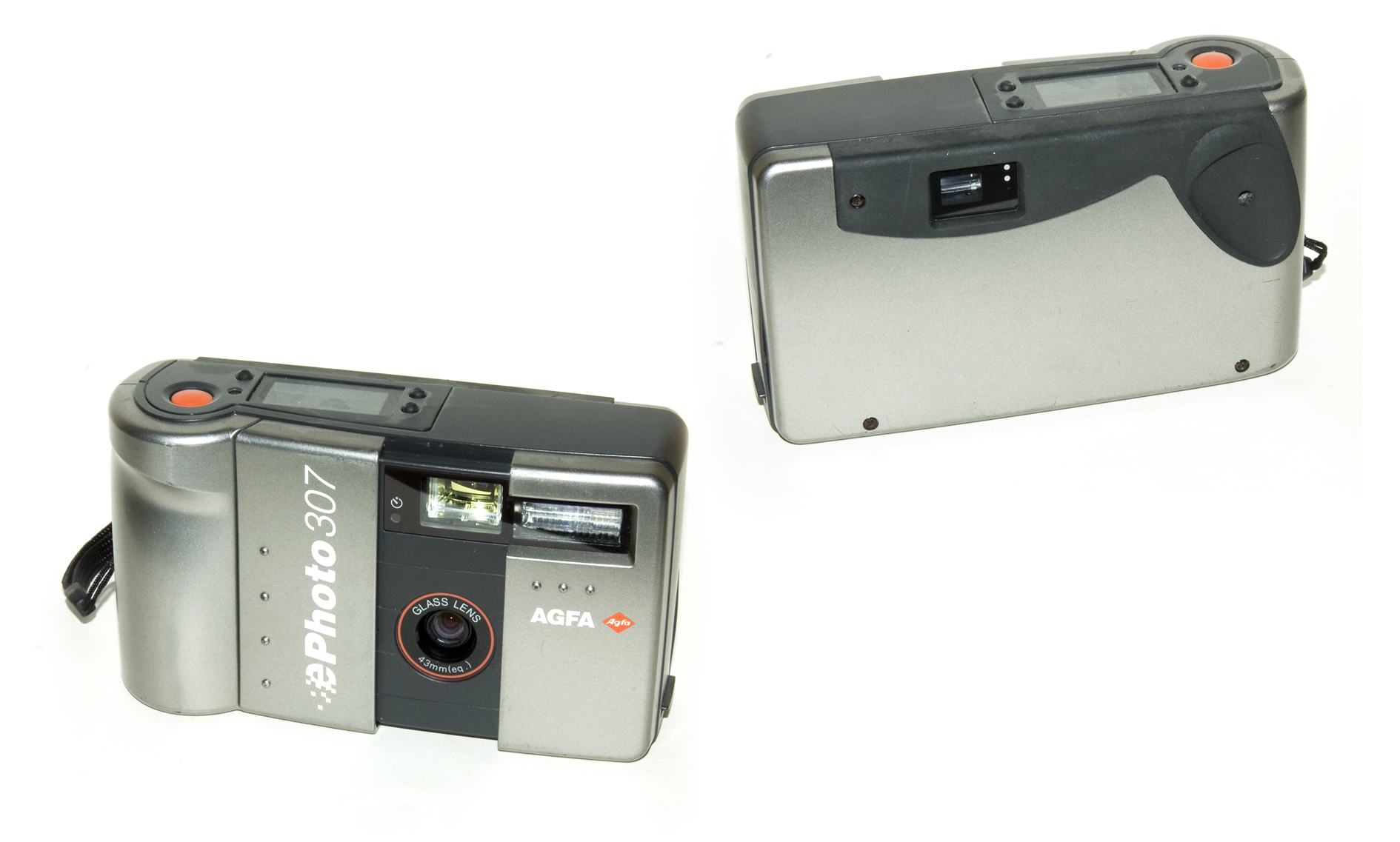
Agfa ePhoto 307

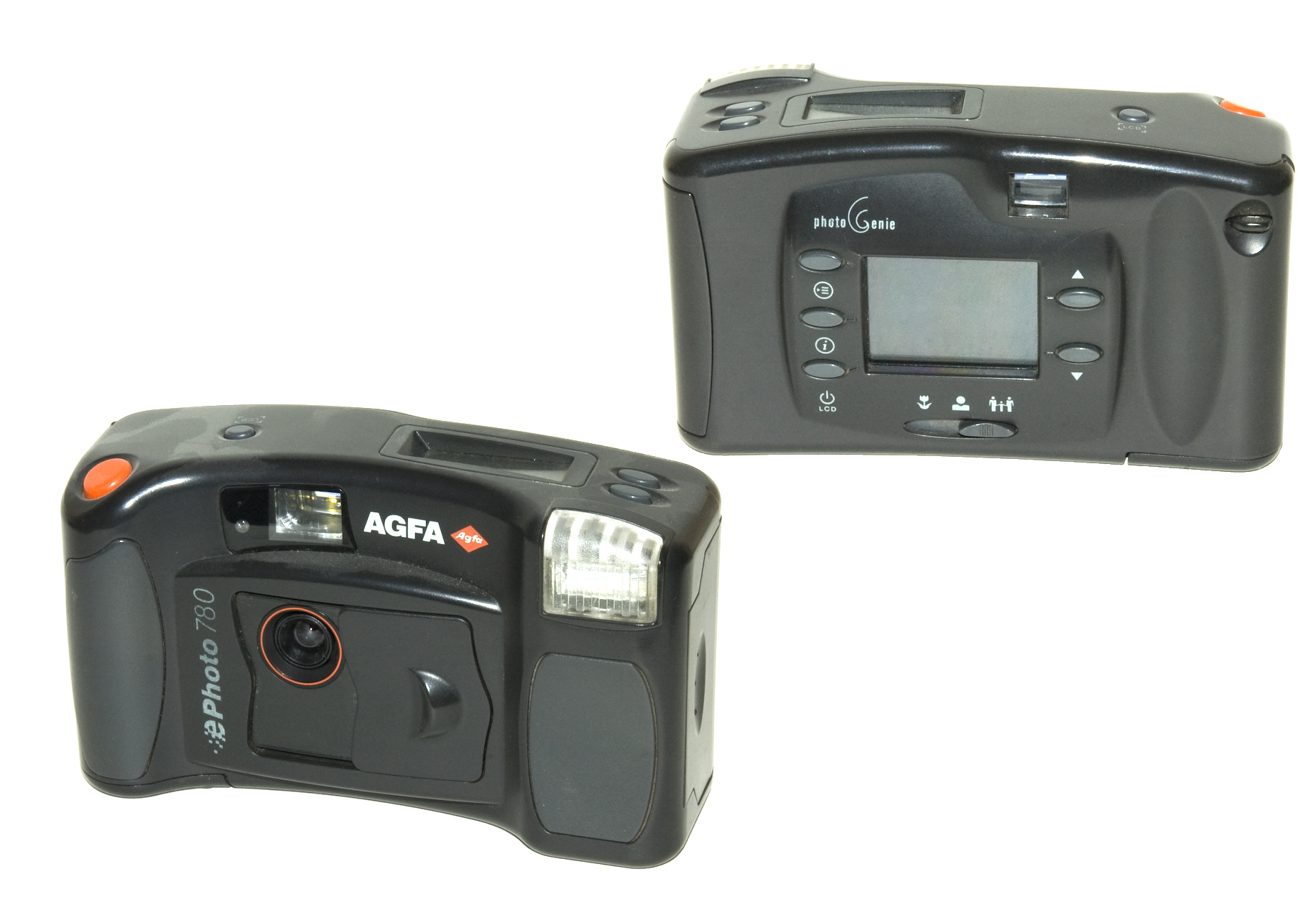
Agfa ePhoto 780

=== Software ===
Agfa brands include:

Medical image and data management software

- Enterprise Imaging
- IMPAX
- ORBIS

Prepress and packaging workflow software

- Apogee Prepress
- Asanti
- Amfortis

== See also ==
- AgfaPhoto
- Agfacolor
- Gevacolor
- André Leysen
- List of photographic equipment makers
- Christian Reinaudo
- List of photographic films
- List of discontinued photographic films
- Mixlink
