= Mixlink =

Color mix computer for car paint shops

Mixlink computer
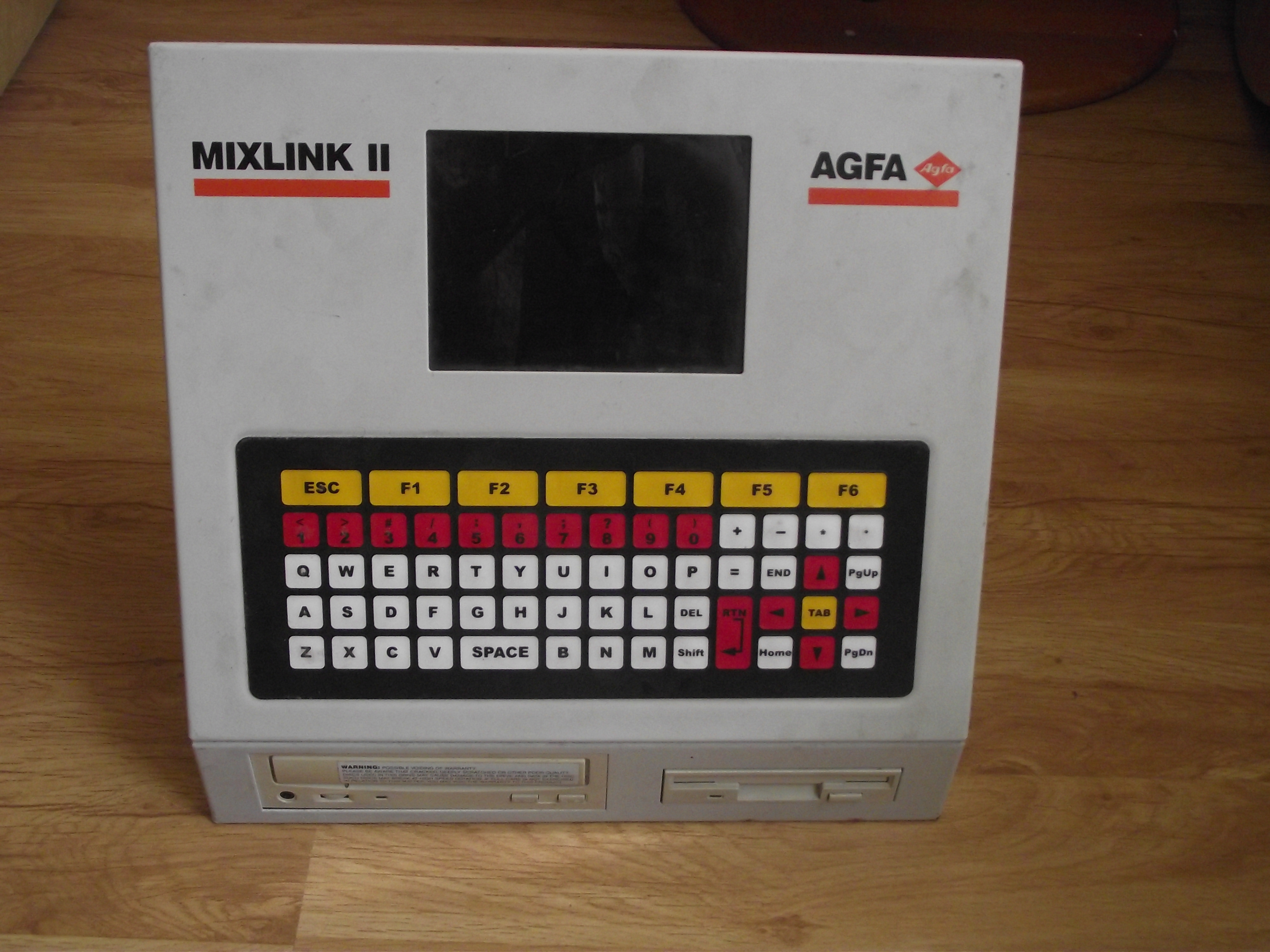
- Mixlink computer.

Mixlink (Mixlink II) is a computer used with Agfa scales. It was developed to facilitate calculation of color mixes.

== Technical characteristics ==
Mixlink contains the Intel 80386 processor with the clock rate which may be set to either 9.2 or 33 MHz. The RAM size is 640 kB. The HDD function is served by the built-in flash memory that has the size of approximately 800 kB. Mixlink has the monochrome display.

Mixlink is also staffed with CD drive and floppy drive.

== Use ==
Mixlink was intended to be used with the supplied floppy and CD disk, which provided the system environment ("operating system") and the application to be used for calculating color mixes. However, it is possible to install and run MS-DOS on Mixlink.

Currently, Mixlink computers are not used; their functions may solely be performed by personal computers (PCs).
