= AgfaPhoto =

Consumer imaging brand and company

- Product type: Consumer imaging
- Current owner: AgfaPhoto Holding GmbH
- Produced by: AgfaPhoto GmbH (2004–2005); Various licensees (2006–present)
- Country: Germany
- Website: agfaphoto.com

AgfaPhoto is a brand of consumer photographic and power products, managed by the German holding firm AgfaPhoto Holding GmbH. The brand originated as a divestiture from the German-Belgian film and imaging manufacturer Agfa-Gevaert (AGFA) in 2004.

== Products ==
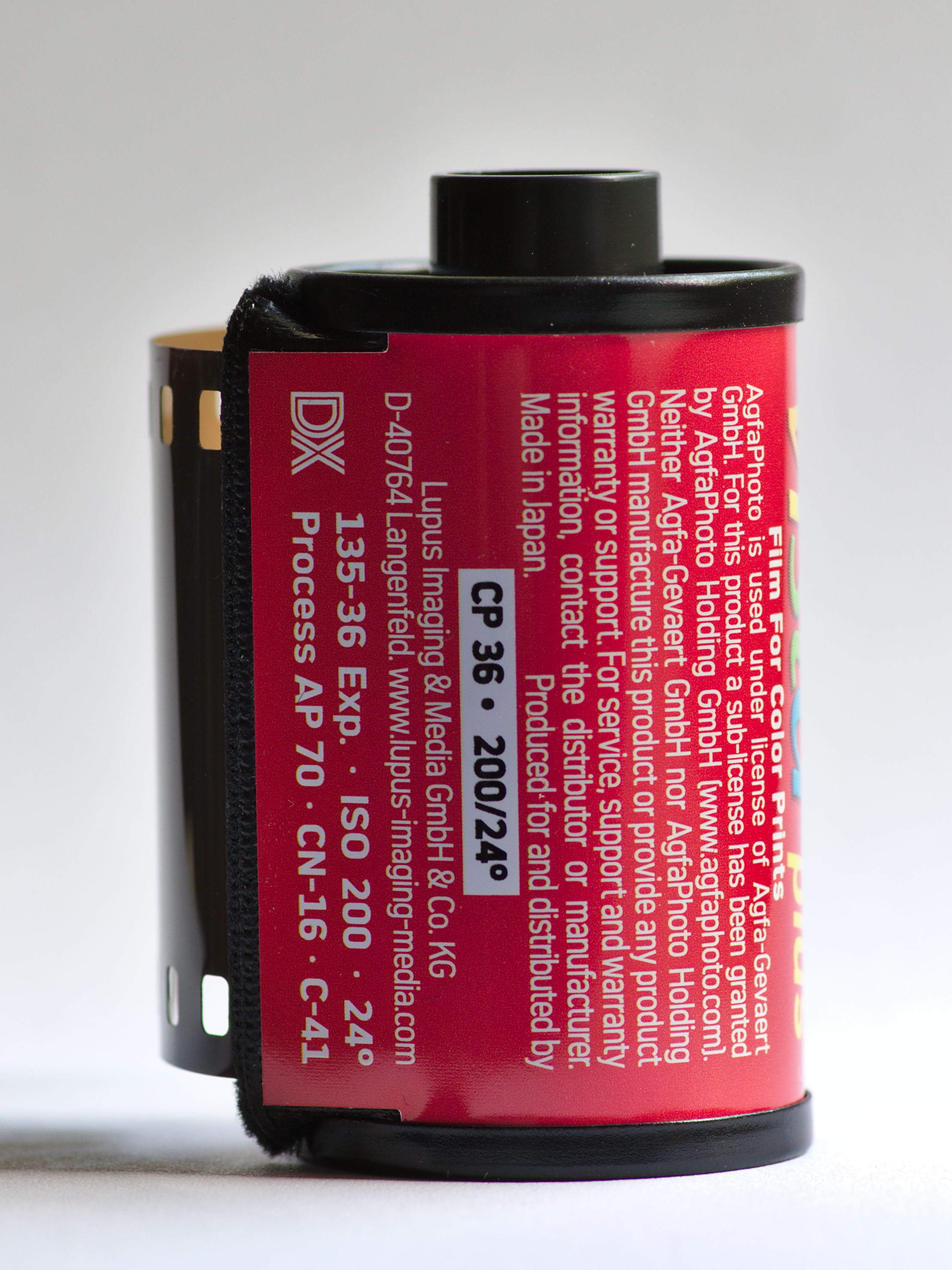
A 135 film canister of AgfaPhoto Vista Plus film with information regarding the usage of the brand.

AgfaPhoto Holding GmbH is headquartered in Grünwald, Bavaria, Germany. Based on a long-term trademark agreement with Agfa-Gevaert, the company grants sub-licenses for the AgfaPhoto trademark and red dot logo to various third-party manufacturers of products in the imaging sector and some other fields. Products that have been released under the brand include electric batteries, photographic paper, digital photo frames, digital cameras, memory cards, scanners, video cameras.

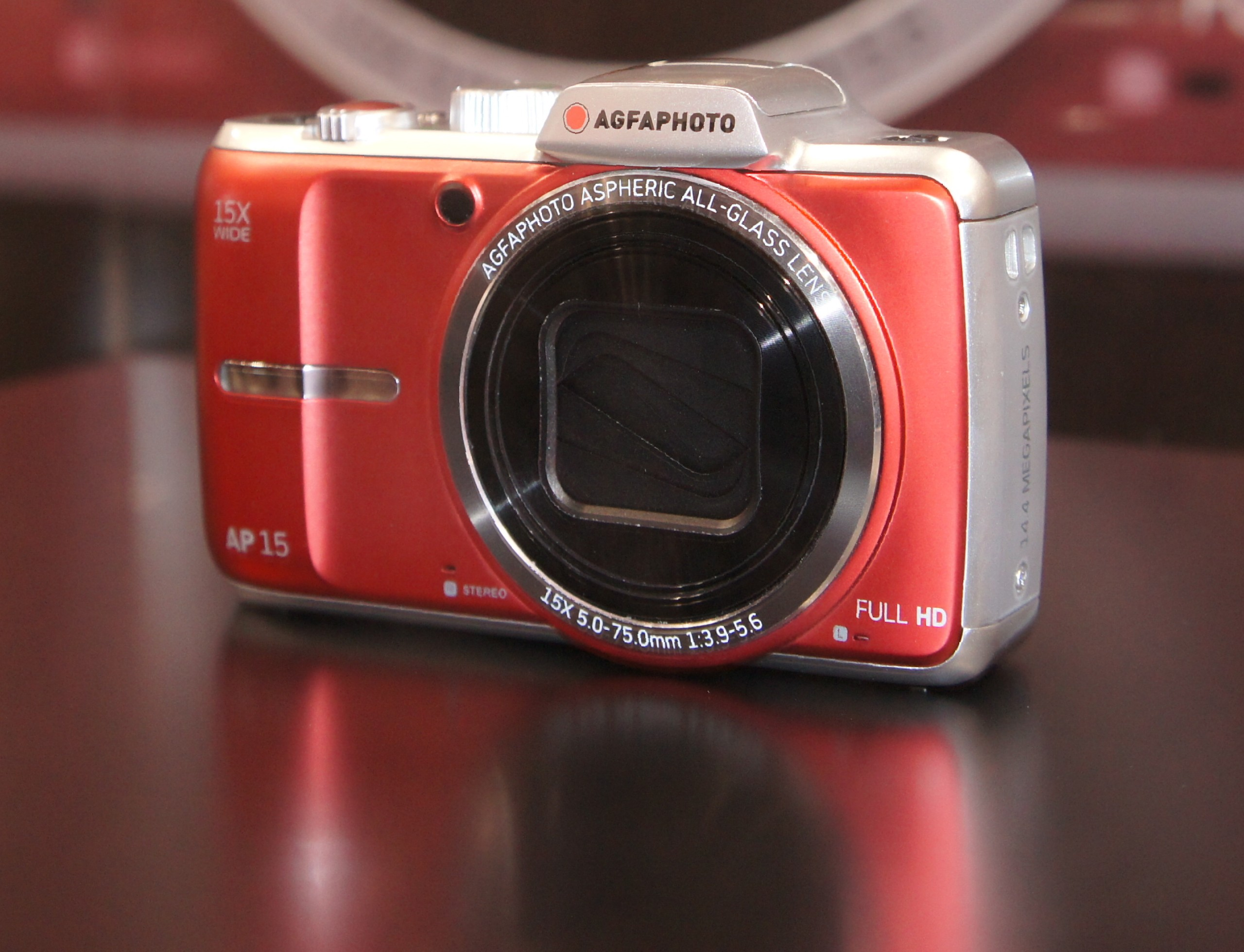
An AgfaPhoto digital camera made by Plawa, 2012

Lupus Imaging & Media GmbH & Co. KG of Langenfeld is the exclusive licensee for AgfaPhoto film stock and disposable cameras (namely the LeBox). Lupus sold AgfaPhoto Vista rolls, which were stocked from Fujifilm designed rolls, until 2018. Currently sold ranges are AgfaPhoto Color and APX some of which are sourced from Ilford Photo of Britain. German company Plawa of Uhingen held the exclusive license for AgfaPhoto digital and video cameras for twelve years (2006–2018). In December 2018, a new agreement was made with a French company named GT Company who continue to be the maker of digital AgfaPhoto products today. GBT (German Battery Technology) GmbH of Düren is the exclusive licensee for AgfaPhoto portable energy, solar panels and household batteries.

== Historic context ==
Agfa (Aktien-Gesellschaft für Anilin-Fabrikation) was founded in Rummelsburg near Berlin in 1867 as a chemical company. In the 20th century they were well known as a producer of consumer-oriented photographic products including films, photographic papers and cameras. After the war and Germany's division, their operations became segregated so Agfa fled to Leverkusen where its paper factory was. In 1964, Agfa merged with Belgian film manufacturer Gevaert. By the time of the new century, Agfa had been facing trouble from the rise of digital photography.

In August 2004, Agfa-Gevaert announced that it had reached a definitive agreement to divest the whole of its Consumer Imaging business in a management buyout led by German businessman and private equity investor Dr. Hartmut Emans for a purchase price of €175.5 million. This division had been responsible for film, finishing products, and lab equipment, and were grouped in a new company, AgfaPhoto GmbH, as well as the related lease portfolio and plants in Leverkusen and photo chemical plant in Vaihingen. A new "AgfaPhoto" branding (rather than "Agfa") was created and transferred to a sister entity named AgfaPhoto Holding GmbH. The closing date of the transaction was November 2, 2004 with 2,400 employees (of which 600 were outside of Germany) transferring to the new AgfaPhoto. The transaction resulted in a non-cash book loss to Agfa-Gevaert of €430 million, but was cash positive to the extent of €260 million. While the trading environment for both HealthCare and Graphic System divisions improved considerably, the group's half year results were heavily affected by the expected book loss on the divestiture of Consumer Imaging.

=== AgfaPhoto bankruptcy and liquidation ===
The new AgfaPhoto GmbH company was headquartered in Leverkusen, North Rhine-Westphalia and used the new trademarked AgfaPhoto branding name with the iconic red sun logo under license from Agfa-Gevaert. Merely half a year later, AgfaPhoto filed for insolvency on May 26, 2005. The cause of its financial problems were not made public and it was met with some surprise in Germany. AgfaPhoto's insolvency administrator was Dr. Andreas Ringstmeier. After being unable to find a buyer, it was later announced that the company will be liquidated.

The chemical photo production facilities and customer repair service division, including the Vaihingen plant, were purchased by A&O of Potsdam in November 2005 and became part of A&O Imaging Solutions GmbH. Wholesale minilab equipment was sold to Imaging Solutions AG of Switzerland (itself part of Photo-Me International). Its remaining stockpiles of analog film were purchased by Lupus Imaging & Media of Langenfeld, a newly formed company by former Agfa employees, who continued to sell this stock to the public and gained the rights in 2006 to sell newly developed ones under the AgfaPhoto Vista branding. The historic plant at Leverkusen which had been manufacturing film and paper for over 50 years was left unsold. It shut with a significant human cost of job losses and the complex was demolished by 2008.

=== Trademark and licensing ===
Agfa-Gevaert canceled and attempted to recover the AgfaPhoto brand after AgfaPhoto GmbH's bankcuptcy, which remained under ownership of Dr. Hartmut Emans's AgfaPhoto Holding GmbH. However Agfa-Gevaert lost this trademark dispute in December 2007 and were forced to abide by the 2004 contract of a permanent lease of the brand to this entity, opening the way for Emans to permanently license the AgfaPhoto brand for use by other companies having already begun doing so. The Agfa name retained high awareness in Europe. In September 2006, the AgfaPhoto brand returned with the first licensing agreement with German company Plawa who developed and released the AgfaPhoto DC-735, a 7-megapixel CCD sensor digital camera. Shortly afterwards French maker Sagem gained the AgfaPhoto brand license for photo printers while the aforementioned Lupus gained the right for one-time use cameras, black and white film, and batteries. Swiss maker 3T Supplies AG gained in 2007 the brand for inkjet cartridges, laser toners, and photo papers.

=== Litigation ===
AgfaPhoto GmbH's bankruptcy trustee Andreas Ringstmeier accused Agfa-Geveart of corporate malpractice. This led to a legal battle spanning over 20 years between Ringstmeier (representing the unpaid creditors) and Agfa-Geveart which was brought to the ICC International Court of Arbitration. In 2018, the ICC tribunal dismissed Ringstmeier's €410 million claim in favor of Agfa-Geveart and the trustee was ordered to pay 95% multi-million euro legal fees. In 2020, the trustee's lawyers pulled off a rare successful appeal, annuling the 2018 ruling and restarting the battle. The conflict seemed to have concluded in July 2025 when a new ICC panel once again rejected all the trustee's claims. €38 million with interest of legal fees were ordered to be paid to Agfa-Gevaert; the remaining cash in the former bankrupt AgfaPhoto estate were wiped out to cover these costs. In July 2026, the case was opened yet again when the Frankfurt regional high court annulled the 2025 ICC ruling citing that the ICC tribunal violated the insolvency receiver's right to be heard on several occasions. The €45 million paid by the trustee from the AgfaPhoto's former estate were already paid to Agfa-Gevaert and were not required to be paid back while litigation continues. Agfa-Gevaert immediately filed an appeal to the Federal Court of Justice.

== See also ==
- Agfa digital cameras
- List of photographic films
- List of Agfa films with specifications
