= Auguste Baussan =

French sculptor

Sébastien Auguste Baussan
- Born: 24 May 1829; Avignon
- Died: 23 February 1907 (aged 76); Montpellier
- Education: École supérieure des beaux-arts de Montpellier
- Known for: Sculpture

Sébastien Auguste Baussan (24 May 1829, Avignon – 23 February 1907, Montpellier) was a French sculptor.

== Life ==
Originally from Avignon, Auguste Baussan was trained by his father Joseph Baussan (1791–1871), himself a sculptor, and by the painter Charles Matet in Montpellier. Baussan actively participated in the Montpellier artistic milieu of the second half of the 19th century with Matet, Michel Maximilien Leenhardt, Édouard-Antoine Marsal and Frédéric Bazille. He subsequently taught as professor of sculpture at the Montpellier École des Beaux-Arts.

== Works ==
Selected works
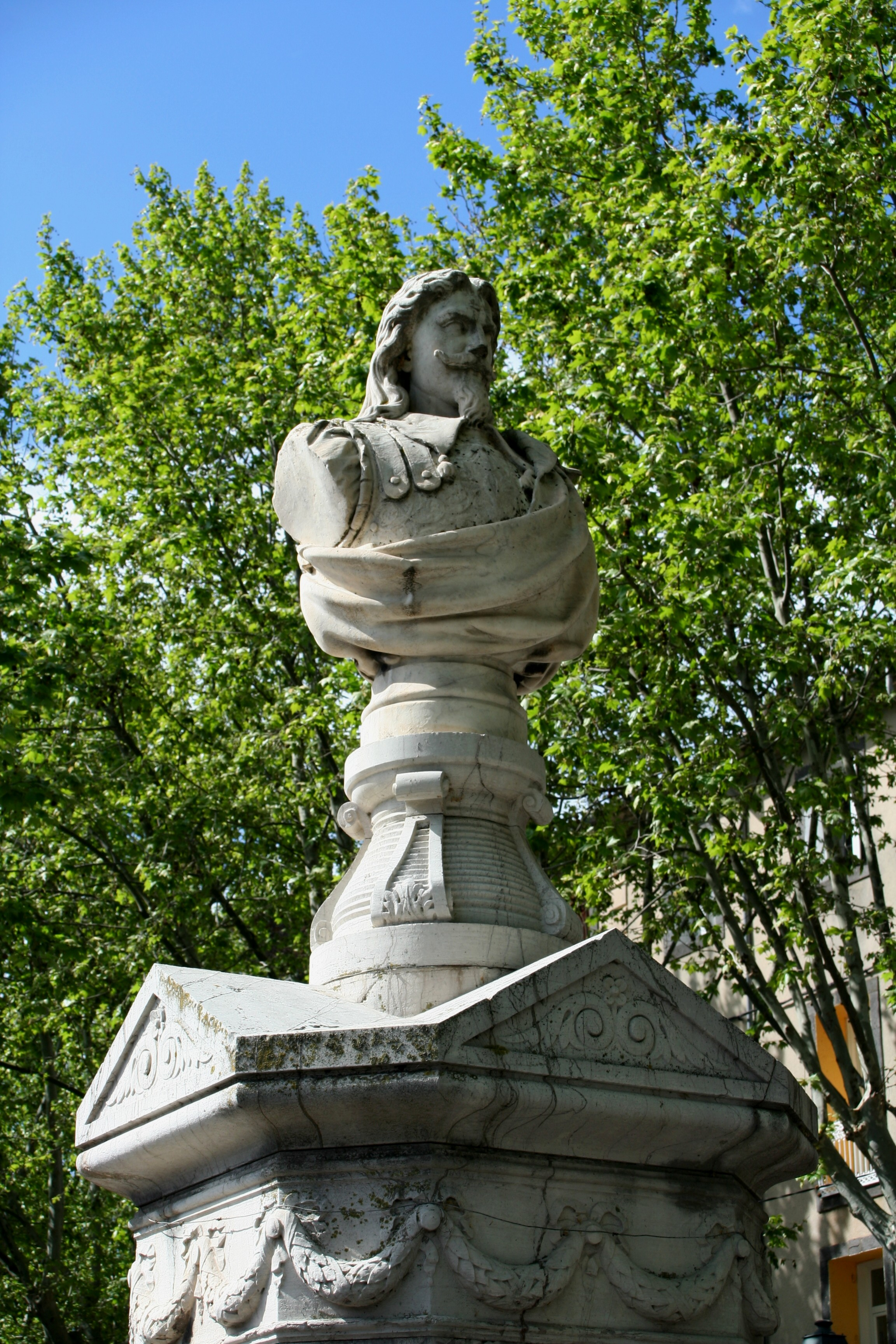
Bust of Claude Terrisse

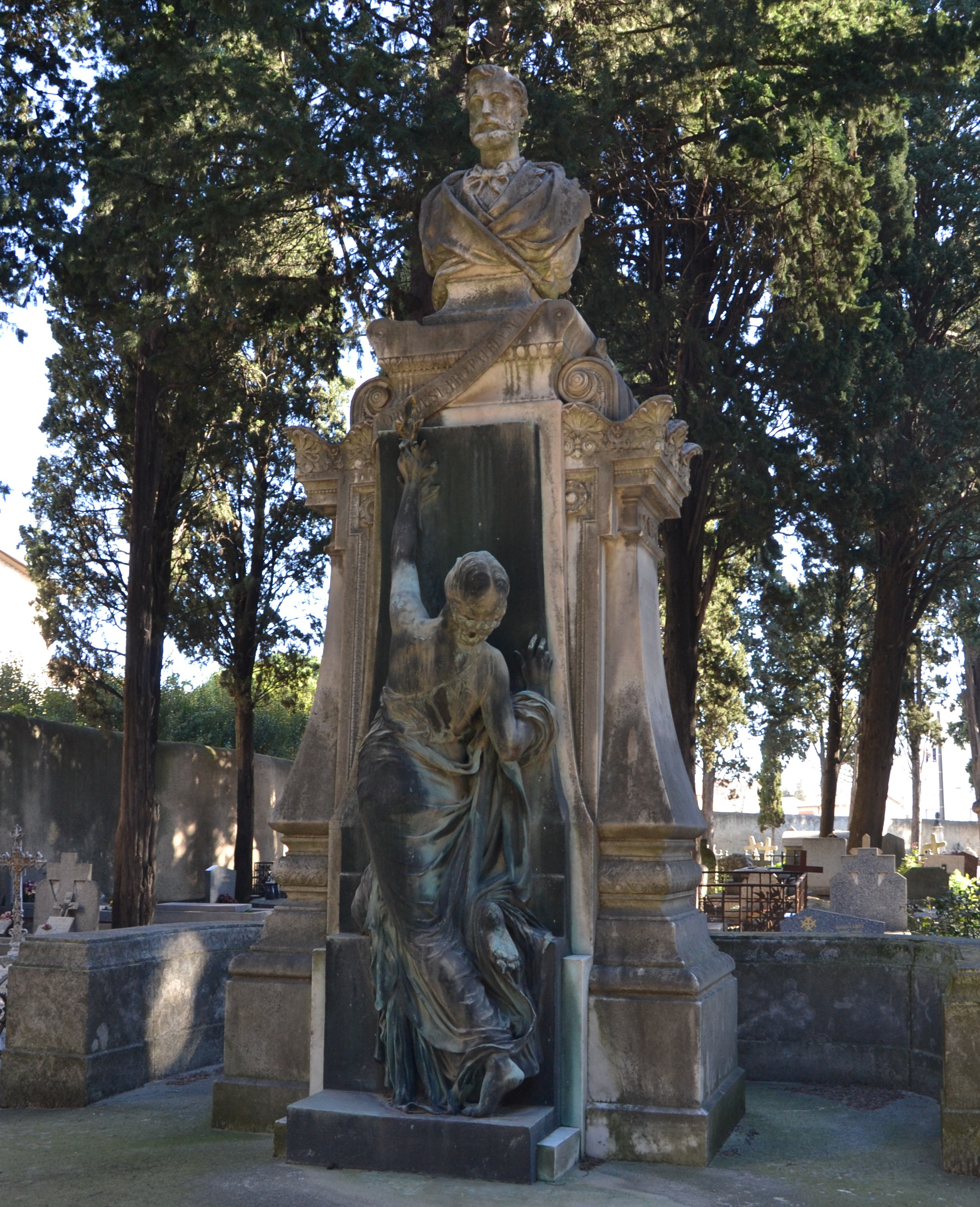
Tomb of Frédéric Bazille

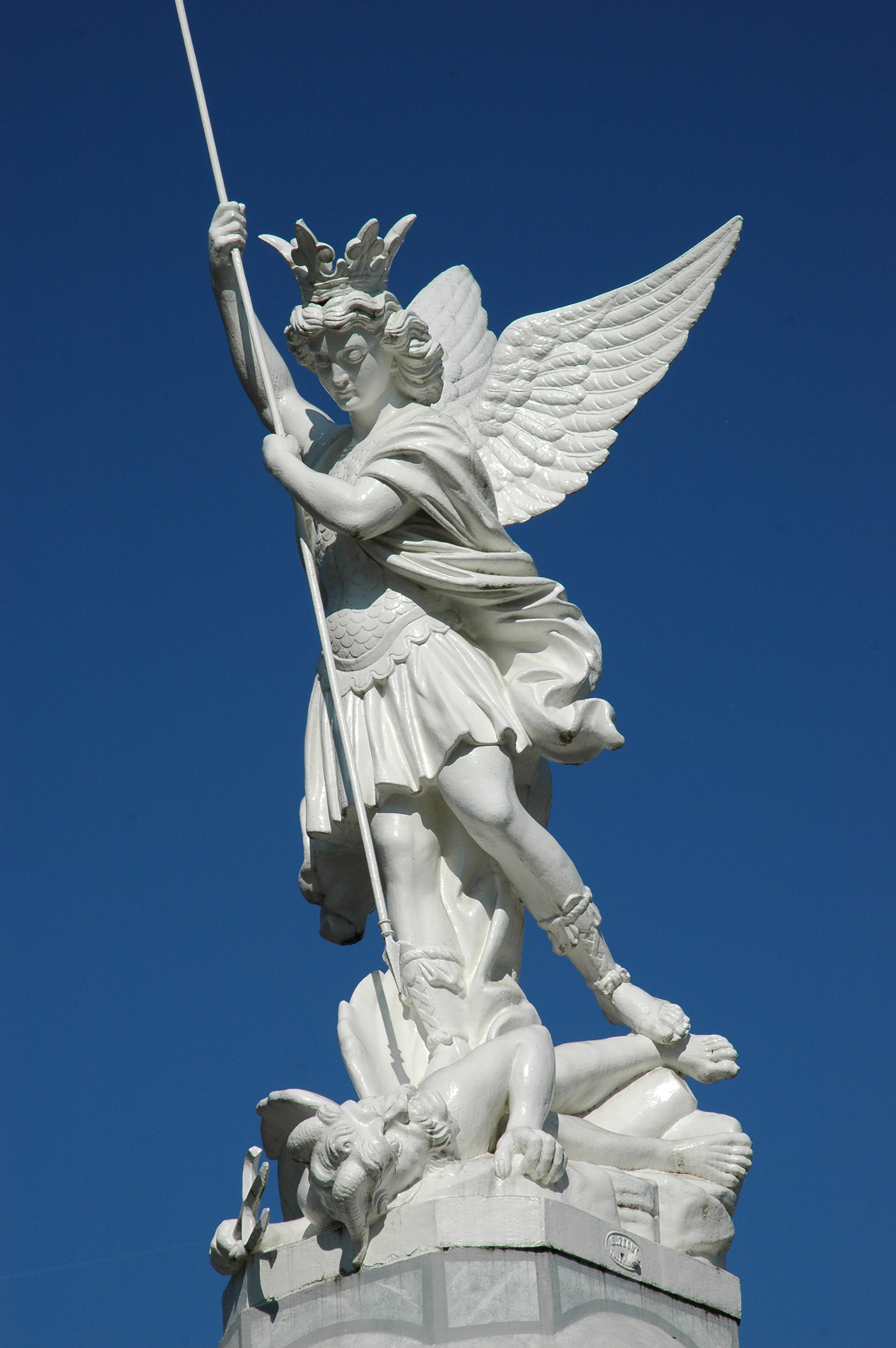
Michael the Archangel

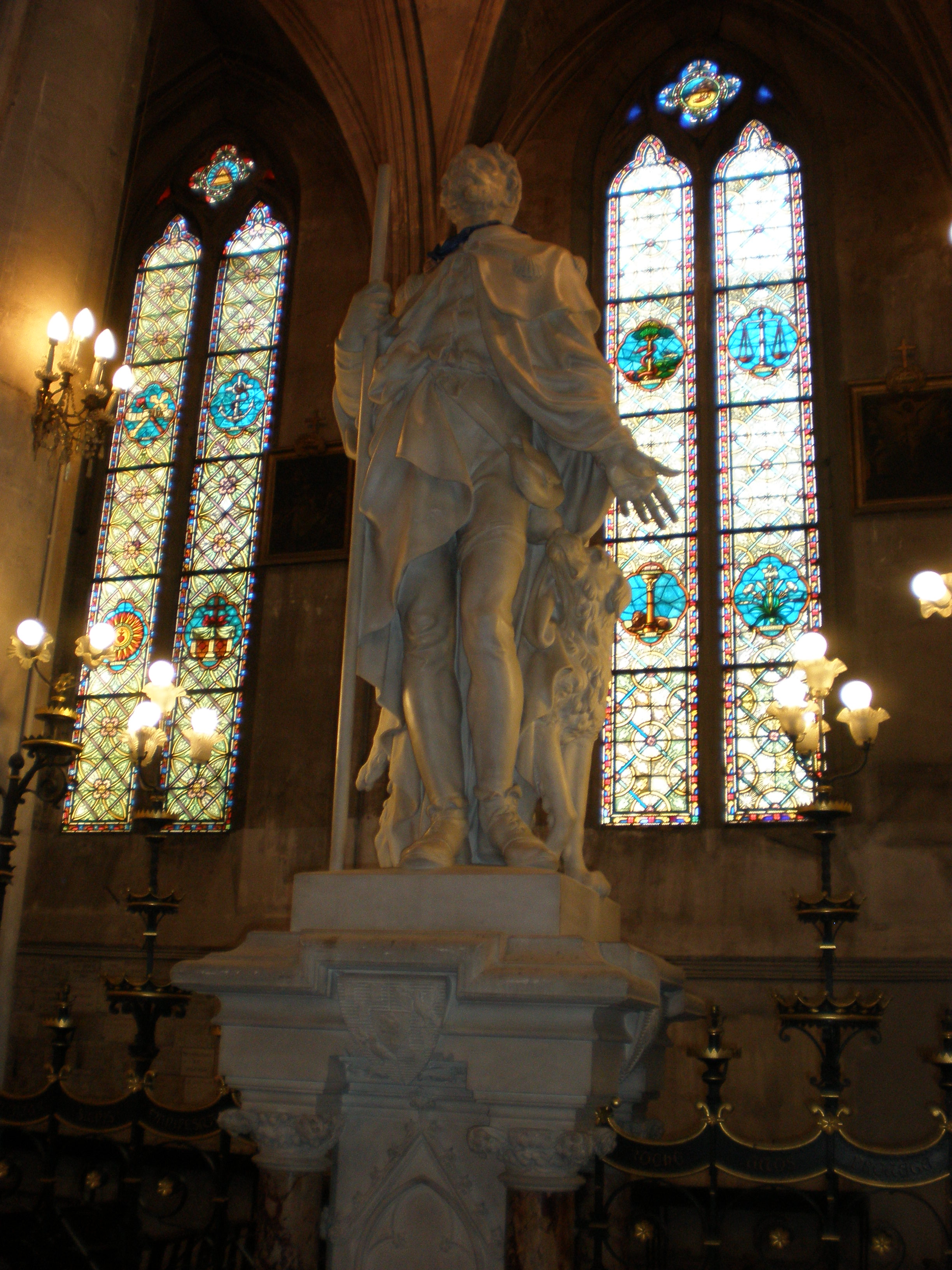
Statue of Saint Roch

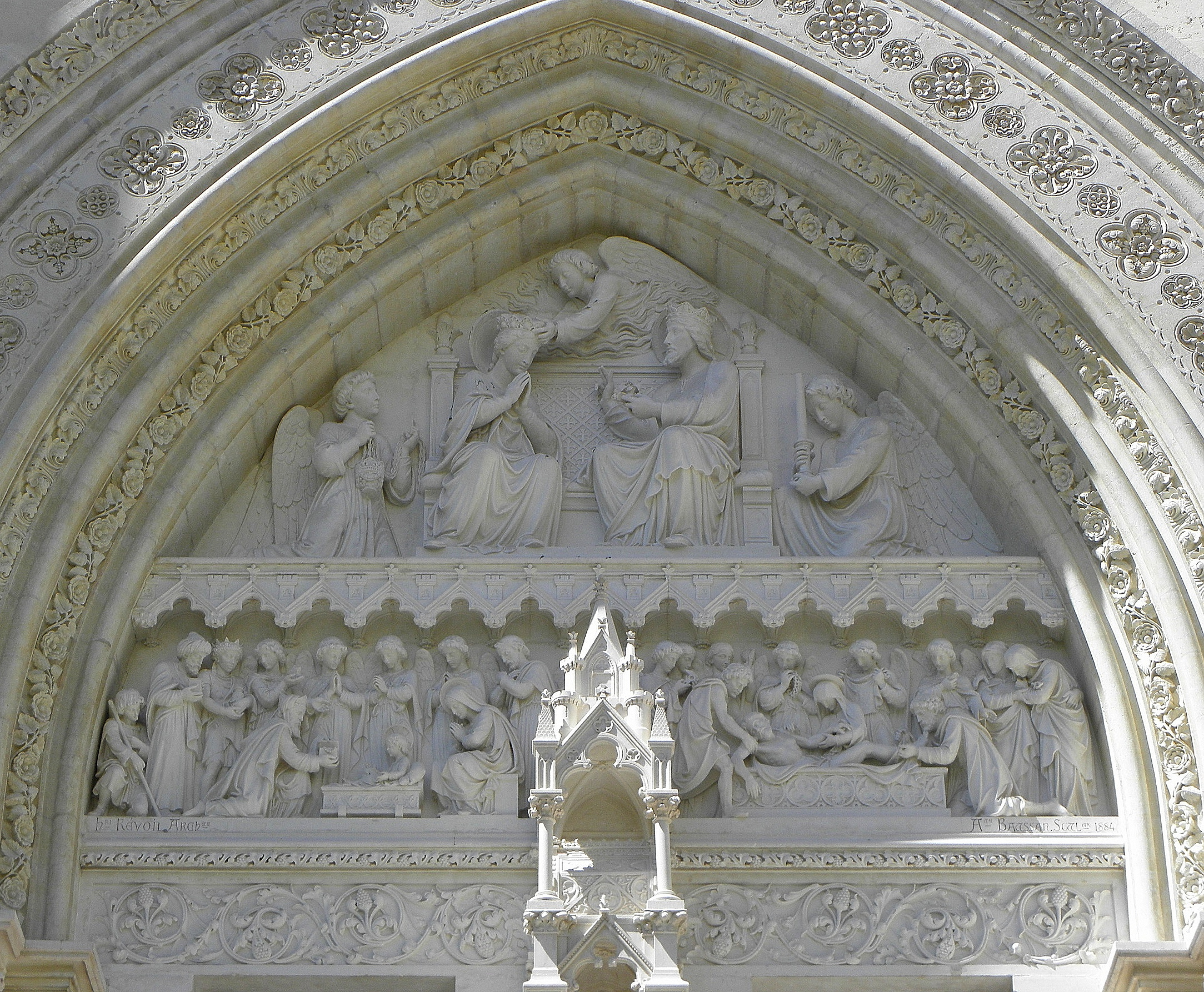
Detail of the right transept of Montpellier Cathedral

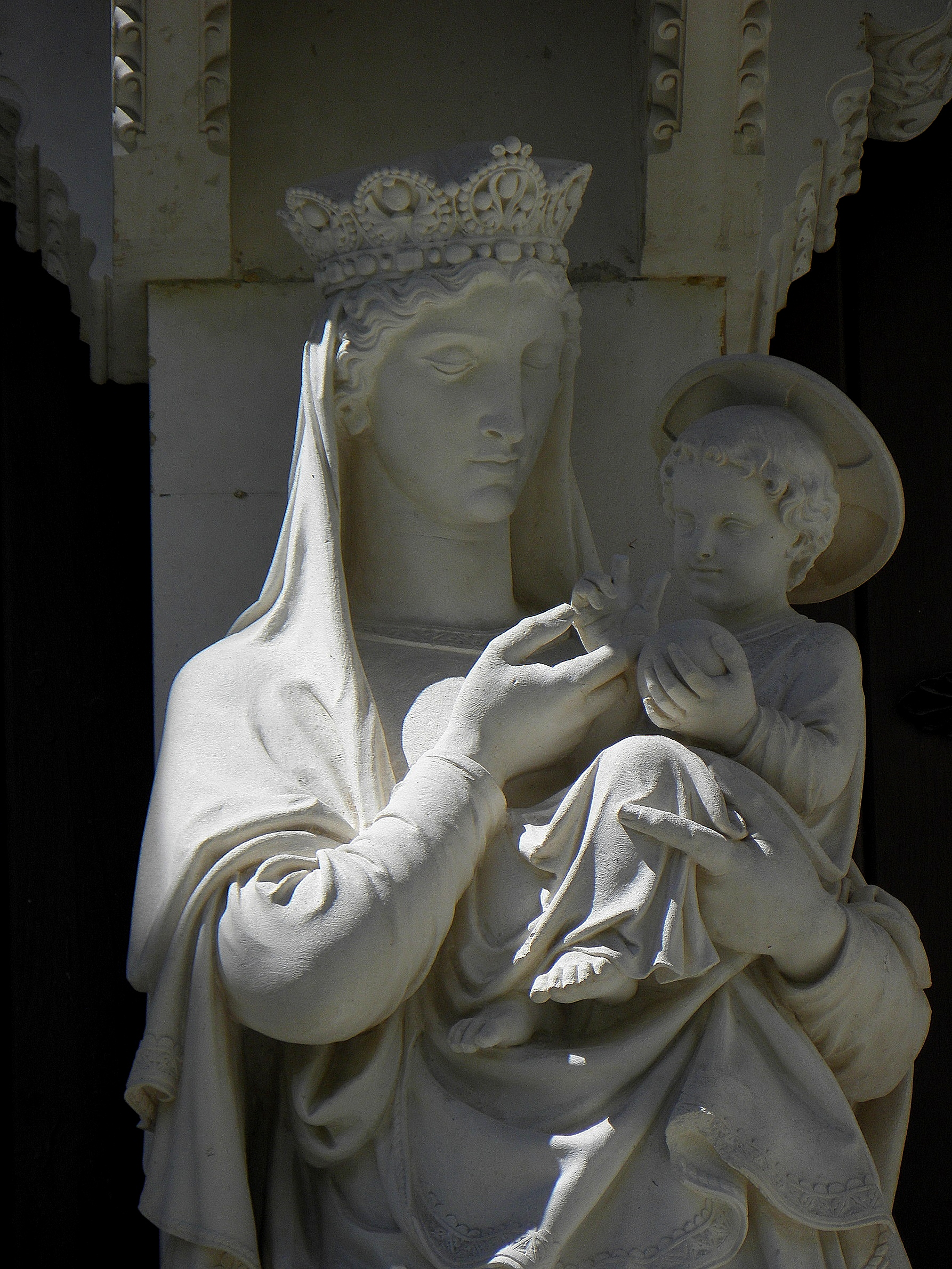
Detail of the Virgin and Child from the trumeau
- Agde:
  - Place de la Belle Agathoise: Agathé, or La Belle Agathoise (1858).
  - Promenade: Monument à Claude Terrisse (1875).
- Alès:
  - Jardin du Bosquet: Monument à Louis Pasteur (1896).
- Béziers:
  - Cimetière Vieux: Monument funéraire de Fortuné Singla (1876).
- Lodève:
  - Cimetière: Monument funéraire de Georges Fabre (1882).
- Montpellier:
  - Centre hospitalier Saint-Éloi:
    - Monument à Combal (1894).
    - Monument à Dubrueil (1894).
    - Monument à Jacques-Mathieu Delpech (1898).
  - Cimetière Protestant:
    - Monument funéraire d'Ernest Audibert (1902).
    - Monument funéraire de Frédéric Bazille (c. 1877).
  - Cimetière Saint-Lazare:
    - Monument funéraire de Polge (1904).
    - Monument funéraire de Joseph et Auguste Baussan (1906).
  - Église Saint-Roch: Statue de Saint Roch (1894).
  - Square Planchon: Monument à Jules Émile Planchon (1893).
  - Université de Montpellier: Buste d'Armand Sabatier (1905).

== Bibliography ==
- Oliver, Valerie Cassel, ed. (2011). "Baussan, Sébastien Auguste". In Benezit Dictionary of Artists. Oxford Art Online.
