= Gustave Chancel =

French chemist

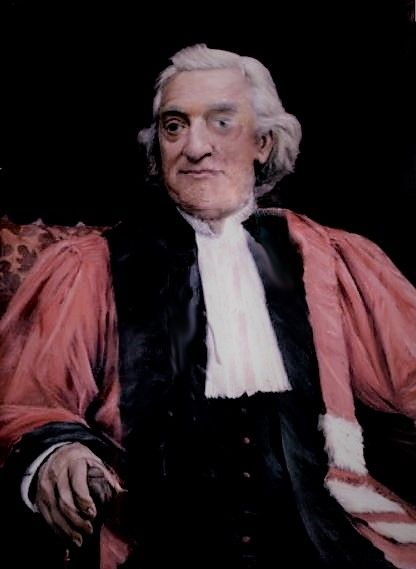
- Portrait by Max Leenhardt, 1895
- Born: January 18, 1822
- Died: August 5, 1890 (aged 68); Montpellier, France
- Scientific career
- Fields: Chemistry
- Institutions: University of Montpellie

Gustave Charles Bonaventure Chancel (18 January 1822 – 5 August 1890) was a French chemist who conducted research on organic and analytical chemistry while also examining chemical aspects of wine making. A method for determining the fineness of ground sulphur involves the use of a calibrated tube sometimes called Chancel's Sulphurimeter.

== Biography ==
Chancel was born in Loriol to army officer Pierre Bonaventure Chancel (1773-1826) and Sophie Caroline de Pirch (1792-1864). A paternal uncle was General Jean-Théophile Chancel and his maternal grandfather Karl Ferdinand von Pirch (1766-1831) was a lord of justice for Dobberphul, Pomerania. After studying at Collège de Tournon and Charlemagne college, he joined Ecole Centrale, Paris. He then worked with Theophile Jules Pelouze on butyric acid derivatives. He became an assistant at the School of Mines in 1846 and worked there for two years. He then joined the University of Montpellier where he worked until the end of his life, collaborating with his mentor Charles-Frederic Gerhardt and Auguste Laurent on the synthesis of ketones and esters apart from studies in qualitative analysis and applied chemistry. He published a textbook on chemical analysis in 1855 along with Gerhardt.

Chancel worked with the wine industry to examine the effects of calcium sulphate addition. He noted that gypsum addition, or the plastering of wine, resulted in the production of potassium sulphate. He also examined the use of sulphur powder in the control of powdery mildew and innovated the "sulphurimeter" to identify the fineness of ground sulphur. This is a graduated narrow glass cylinder with a closed bottom (23 cm long and 5 mm wide) into which 5 grams of the ground sulphur is poured. The finer the powder is, the higher it stands through particle adhesion, when ether is poured into the tube, shaken and allowed to settle. The markings are read from 0 to 100 in "degrees Chancel".

Chancel became dean of the faculty of sciences in 1865 and rector of the Academy of Montpellier from 1879. He died at Montpellier and is buried at the Protestant cemetery of Montpellier. He married a cousin Adeline Berthe Sophie de Pirch (1828-1909) in 1848 who survived him along with five of their seven children. A street in Montpellier was named after him in 1894 and a bust of him was placed at the University of Montpellier in 1896.
