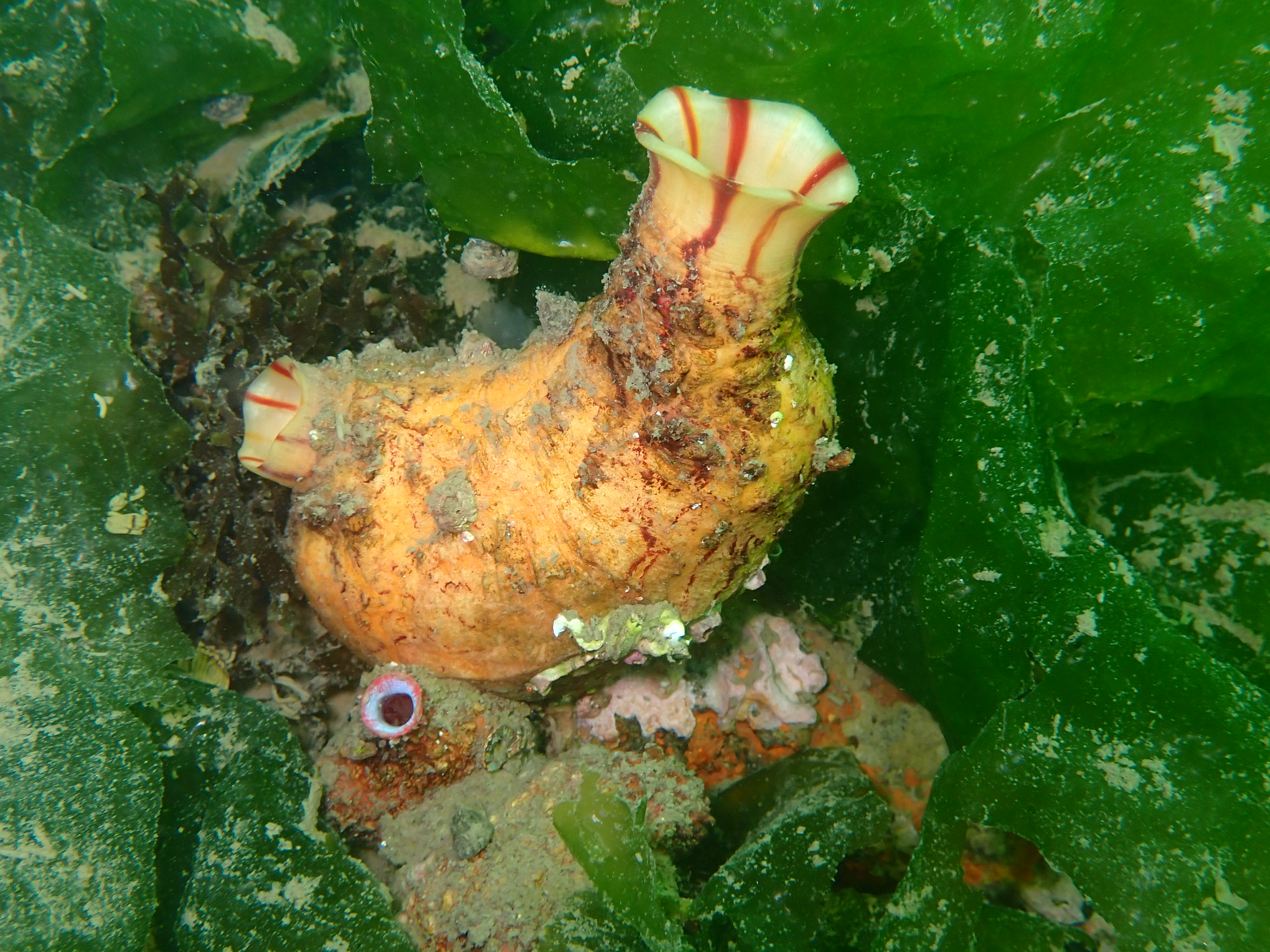
- Microcosmus sabatieri

Scientific classification
- Kingdom: Animalia
- Phylum: Chordata
- Subphylum: Tunicata
- Class: Ascidiacea
- Order: Stolidobranchia
- Family: Pyuridae
- Genus: Microcosmus
- Species: M. sabatieri

Binomial name
- Microcosmus sabatieri (Roule, 1885)

Synonyms
- Ascidia microcosmus Cuvier, 1815; Cynthia scrotum Delle Chiaje, 1828; Microcosmus scrotum (Delle Chiaje, 1828)

= Microcosmus sabatieri =

Species of sea squirt

Microcosmus sabatieri, commonly called the grooved sea squirt, sea fig, or violet, is a species of tunicates (sea squirts). The species has a rocky-shape appearance. It is mainly found in the Mediterranean Sea. It is used as food in parts of Europe.

== Uses ==
Three species of Microcosmus are edible presently, M. sabatieri, M. vulgaris, and M. polymorphus (Vafidis 2008). In the Mediterranean Basin, it is eaten raw, often with an acidic condiment such as lemon juice or mignonette. It has a strong iodine taste which not all appreciate.

== Names ==
The specific epithet sabatieri is in honor of zoologist Armand Sabatier. The name 'violet' is from the distinguishing violet stripes on the siphon.

The species has many common names. In Dutch it is violet-zakpijp (lit. violet pocket-pipe) or begroeide zakpijp (overgrown pocket-pipe). In French it's violet, figue de mer (lit. sea fig), and in Marseille, patate de mer (lit. sea potato), or vioulé. In Northern Catalonia it's called bijú or bijut (jewel) and in the Principality bunyol or ou de mar (sea fritter or sea egg). In German the common term is Seefeige (lit. sea fig) or eßbare Seescheide (edible sea sheath). It is Φούσκα (foúska, lit. bubble or puff) in Greek. In Italian, limone di mare (sea lemon) or uova di mare (sea egg) are used. Names in Spanish include provecho (profit), patatas de mar (sea potatoes), and buñuelo de mar (sea fritter). In Ligurian it can be called stronsci de mä (sea turds). In Morocco, in both Moroccan Darija and Berber, it's called fezḍāḍ (فزضاض) or afezḍāḍ (ⴰⴼⴻⵣⴹⴰⴹ, أفزضاض).

Other names it is sold under include:

- viourlet
- bijut/bichu
- carnummole (Campania)
- morsko jaje (lit. "sea egg"; Croatia)
- taratufi (Apulia)

Note that plants of the genus Carpobrotus are also known as 'sea figs'.

== Gallery ==
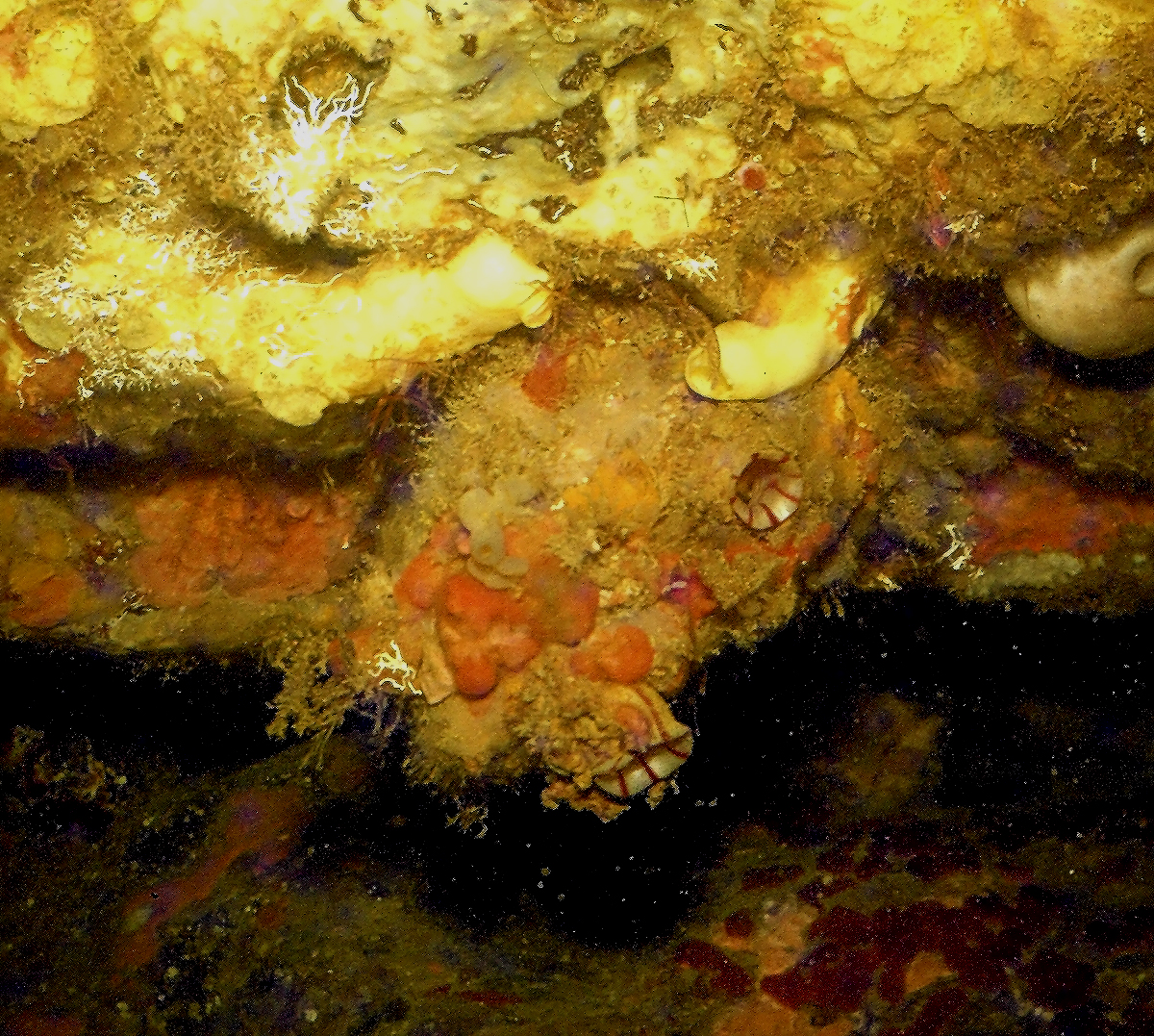
Microcosmus sabatieri at Banyuls-sur-Mer

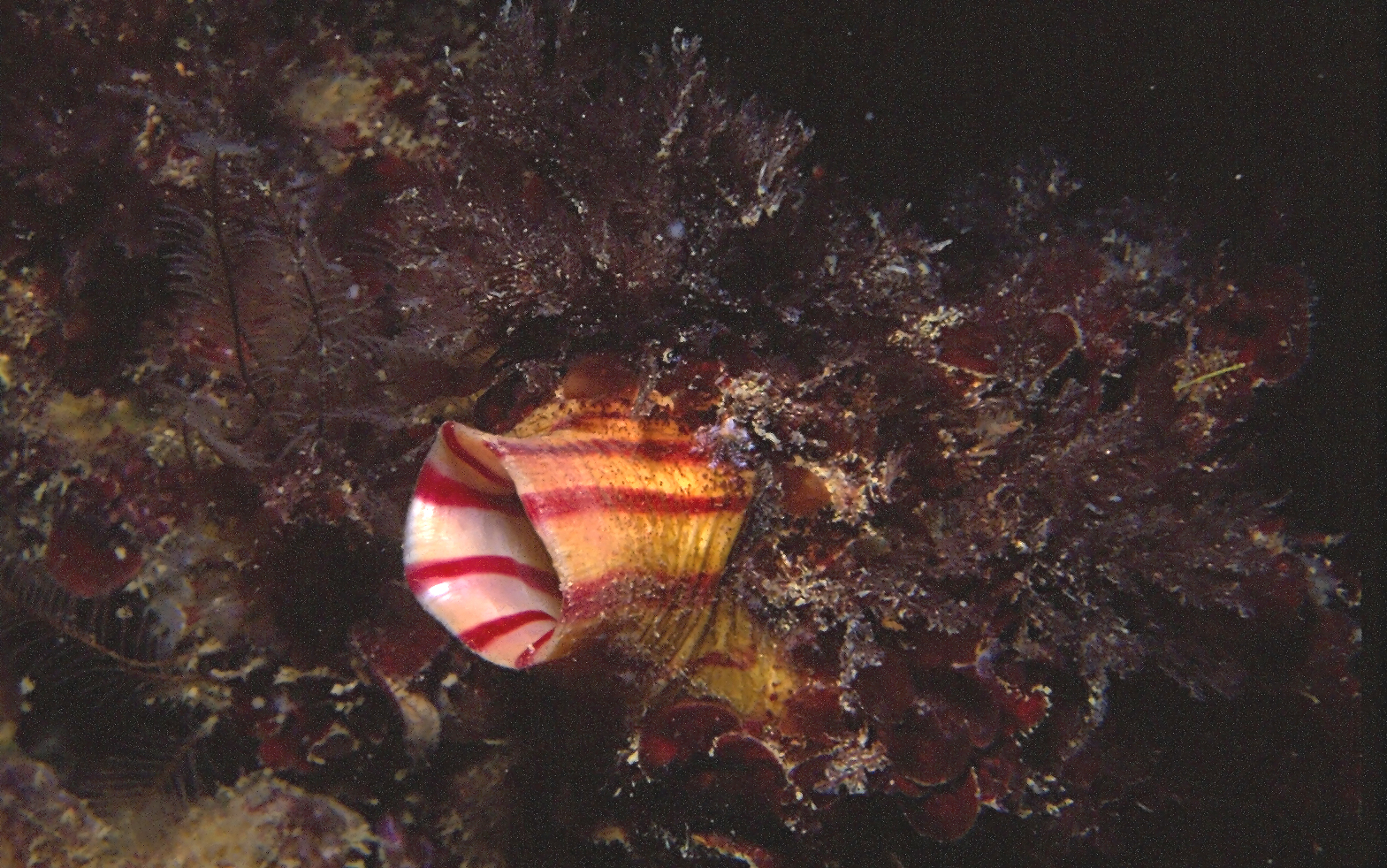
Microcosmus sabatieri at Banyuls-sur-Mer

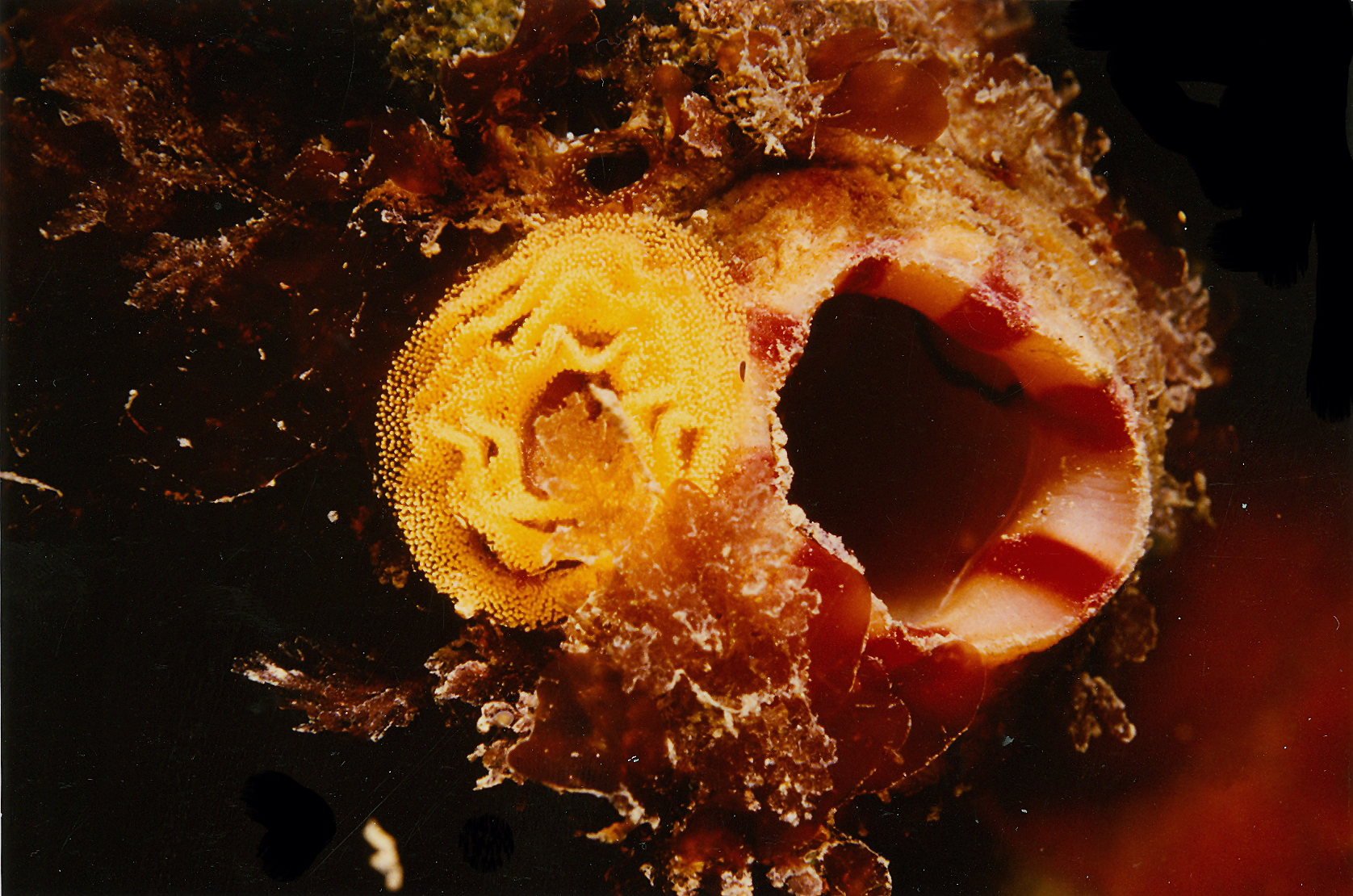
Inhalant siphon of Microcosmos sabatieri. The yellow feature at the left is a clutch of mollusk eggs.
