= Agfacontour Professional =

Emulsion sheet film

Agfacontour Professional was (as of 2002 not anymore produced) a special emulsion sheet film which, after exposure and development in the Agfacontour developer, produced direct equidensities.

Agfacontour was introduced in 1970 by Agfa-Gevaert to produce equidensities by a direct, one-developing-step process.

Until then equidensities had to be obtained using one of the following techniques:

- The most popular method to obtain equidensities was the One-Film technique, better known as Sabattier effect (a.k.a. Pseudosolarization).
- Another technique, making tonal extractions on high-contrast film, was called the Two-Film technique (negative-positive process): from a negative 3-5 different exposures were made on ultra high-contrast lith-films. These 3-5 positives were then copied again on ultra high-contrast lith-film to obtain negatives with virtually no grey tones. Then one positive and a negative from a different set were sandwiched together in register to obtain one specific equidensity. Using the same shuffling, the other positives were combined with the negatives to resulting in 2-4 equidensity series.
- Although there are other techniques such as the Scattered-light technique or Electronic (video) techniques, they are less important for obtaining equidensity series.

Each of these techniques had its drawbacks of which reproducibility and extensive work involvement were undoubtedly the most important ones. Therefore the researchers at Agfa-Gevaert set up a workgroup to develop a film that enables the use of equidensitometry with the following, principal evaluation methods of an information-carrier

1. A Black and white extract of a precisely controllable range of densities
2. A breakdown into separate, distinctive density ranges which could be created in a manageable manner by colorizing or using Halftone screens
3. Distance measurement of similar densities, called isodensities (especially in cases of density gradients)
4. Information clarification/reduction in the presence of chaotic density distribution and density gradients

The Agfacontour film contained two special emulsions with each different spectral sensitivity.

- By using color filters (yellow or magenta) during the exposure one could respectively narrow or widen the width of the equidensity.
- By varying the exposure one could change the density in the image that showed on Agfacontour as equidensity.

Although the material exhibited very low sensitivity (long exposures were necessary) the results were very reproducible and second order equidensities were sharp and clear, something that with pseudo-solarization was almost impossible to achieve without special procedures.

The Gamma of the material was very high (approx. above 7.0), power of resolution was 40 lines/mm

Since the introduction of Photo editing software, altering curves into U-curves also produces equidensities.

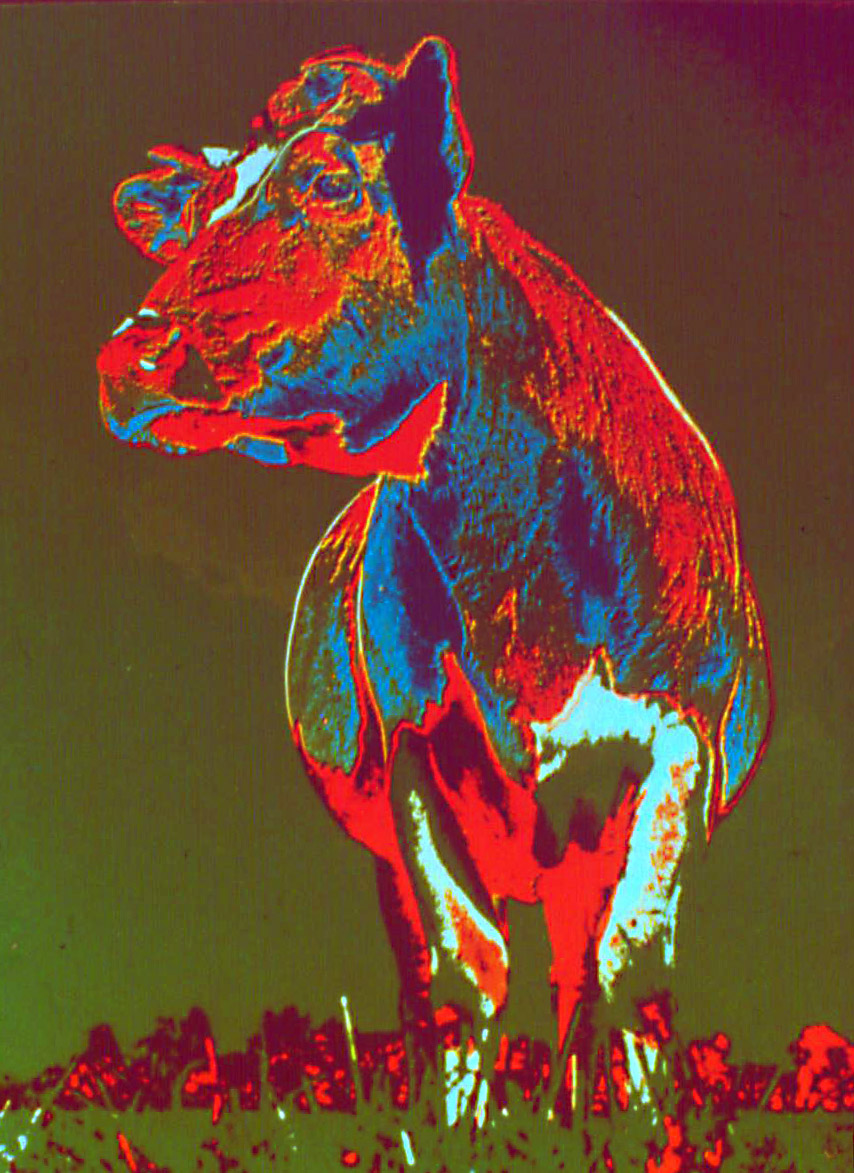
Equidensities serie, chromogenic development

For the image at the right a darkroom process was used that encompassed the production a serie of equidensities of the negative, enlarged on Agfacontour Professional sheetfilm. Each sheet was then copied onto lith film and developed in lith developer. Each copy was then developed in a chromogenic developer. All colored lith films were then put together in register and a positive print on color paper was made.

== See also ==
- Agfa Publication Department, Agfacontour Professional in Photographics. Leverkusen, 1970: Agfacontour Film on Internet Archive
- Solf, Kurt Dieter (Februar 1973). "Äquidensitenfilm". Fotografie. Frankfurt am Main: Fischer Taschenbuch Verlag GmbH. pp. 111–118. ISBN 3436014532.
- Mass, H. "Agfacontour Professional in der Praxis." Phototechnik und Wirtschaft (1971) Nr.2, p 39
- Myšák, F "The Evaluating of Autoradiographs by Means of the Film Agfacontour Professional"
