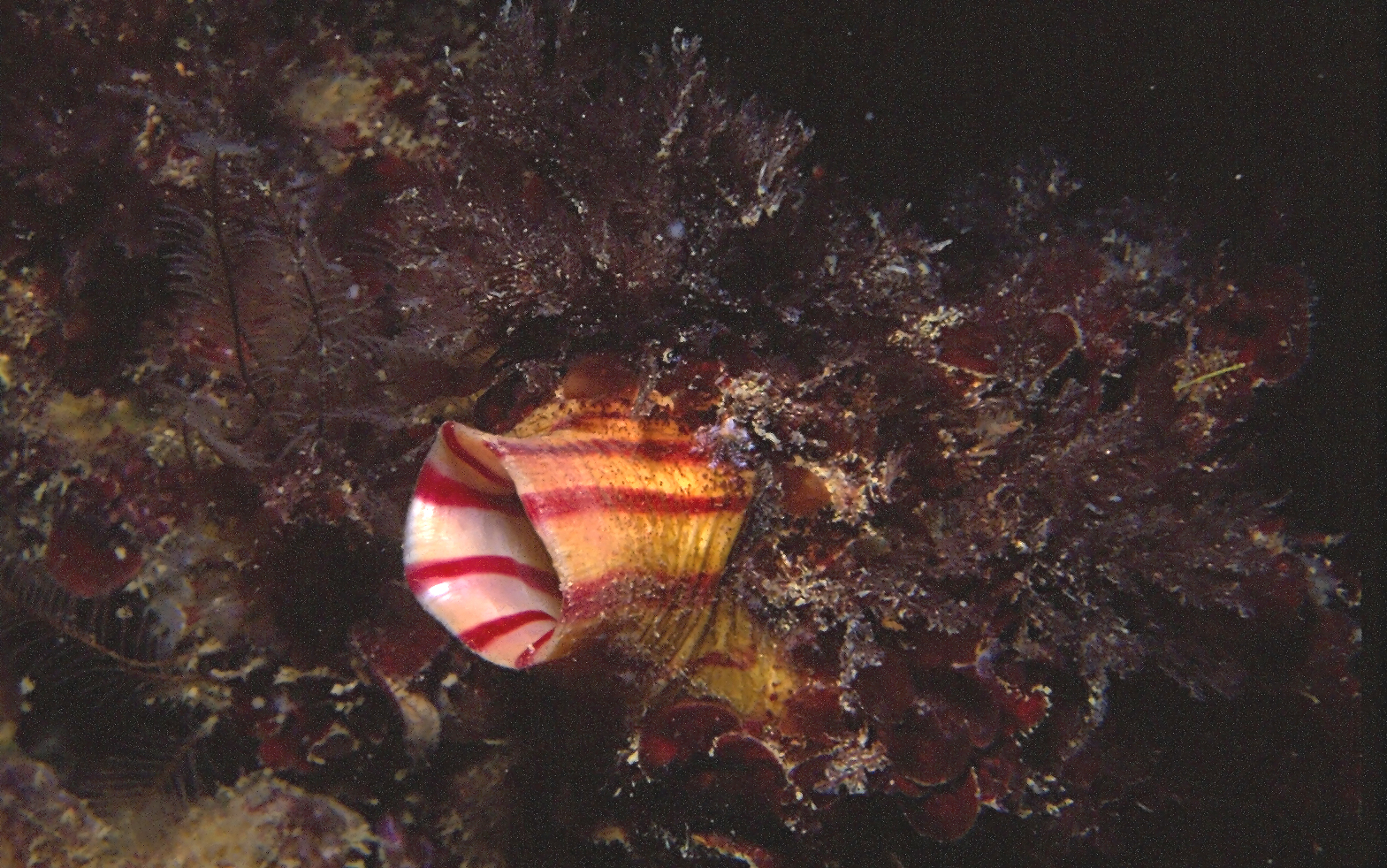
- Microcosmus sabatieri

Scientific classification
- Kingdom: Animalia
- Phylum: Chordata
- Subphylum: Tunicata
- Class: Ascidiacea
- Order: Stolidobranchia
- Family: Pyuridae
- Genus: Microcosmus; Heller, 1877

= Microcosmus =

Genus of sea squirts

Microcosmus is a genus of tunicates in the family Pyuridae, containing the following species:

- Microcosmus albidus Michaelsen, 1904
- Microcosmus anchylodeirus Traustedt, 1883
- Microcosmus anomalocarpus Millar, 1988
- Microcosmus arenaceus Sluiter, 1904
- Microcosmus australis Herdman, 1898
- Microcosmus bitunicatus Monniot & Monniot, 2001
- Microcosmus claudicans (Savigny, 1816)
- Microcosmus curvus Tokioka, 1954
- Microcosmus exasperatus Heller, 1878
- Microcosmus glacialis (Sars, 1859)
- Microcosmus hartmeyeri Oka, 1906
- Microcosmus helleri Herdman, 1881
- Microcosmus hernius (Monniot & Monniot, 1973)
- Microcosmus hirsutus Sluiter, 1900
- Microcosmus longicloa Monniot & Monniot, 1991
- Microcosmus madagascariensis Michaelsen, 1918
- Microcosmus miniaceus Sluiter, 1900
- Microcosmus multiplicatus Tokioka, 1952
- Microcosmus multitentaculatus Tokioka, 1953
- Microcosmus nudistigma C. Monniot, 1962
- Microcosmus oligophyllus Heller, 1878
- Microcosmus pacificus Monniot & Monniot, 2001
- Microcosmus planus Kott, 1975
- Microcosmus polymorphus Heller, 1877
- Microcosmus propinquus Herdman, 1881
- Microcosmus psammiferus Monniot, Monniot, Griffiths & Schleyer, 2001
- Microcosmus pupa (Savigny, 1816)
- Microcosmus sabatieri Roule, 1885
- Microcosmus santoensis Monniot & Monniot, 2003
- Microcosmus savignyi Monniot, 1962
- Microcosmus senegalensis Michaelsen, 1915
- Microcosmus squamiger Michaelsen, 1927
- Microcosmus stoloniferus Kott, 1952
- Microcosmus trigonimus Millar, 1955
- Microcosmus tuberculatus Kott, 1985
- Microcosmus vesiculosus Monniot & Monniot, 2001
- Microcosmus vulgaris Heller, 1877
