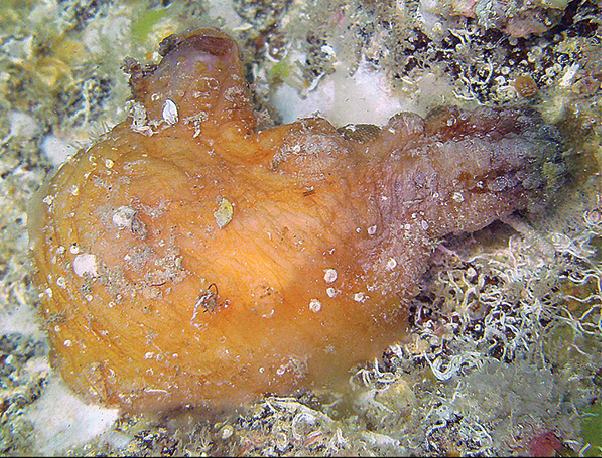

Scientific classification
- Domain: Eukaryota
- Kingdom: Animalia
- Phylum: Chordata
- Subphylum: Tunicata
- Class: Ascidiacea
- Order: Stolidobranchia
- Family: Pyuridae
- Genus: Microcosmus
- Species: M. exasperatus

Binomial name
- Microcosmus exasperatus Heller, 1878

= Microcosmus exasperatus =

Species of marine invertebrate

Microscosmus exasperatus is a species of tunicate in the family, Pyuridae, and was first described in 1878 by Camill Heller.

It is found in the warm, temperate and tropical seas of Australia, where it is found on the coastal shelves of New South Wales, the Northern Territory, Queensland, and Western Australia. It is also found in seas off the West Indies, east Africa and in the Red Sea. It has been found on many substrates including "pilings, stones, mangrove roots, and coral reefs, buoys, floats, and vessel hulls".

It is an invasive species, and is now found in the central and eastern Mediterranean, and Pacific oceanic islands. (The Smithsonian considers its native range to be the eastern and western tropical Atlantic, and the Indo-West Pacific.)

This species is often confused with Microcosmus squamiger but has longer spines. It feeds on phytoplankton.
