= Sabattier effect =

Photographic tone reversal technique

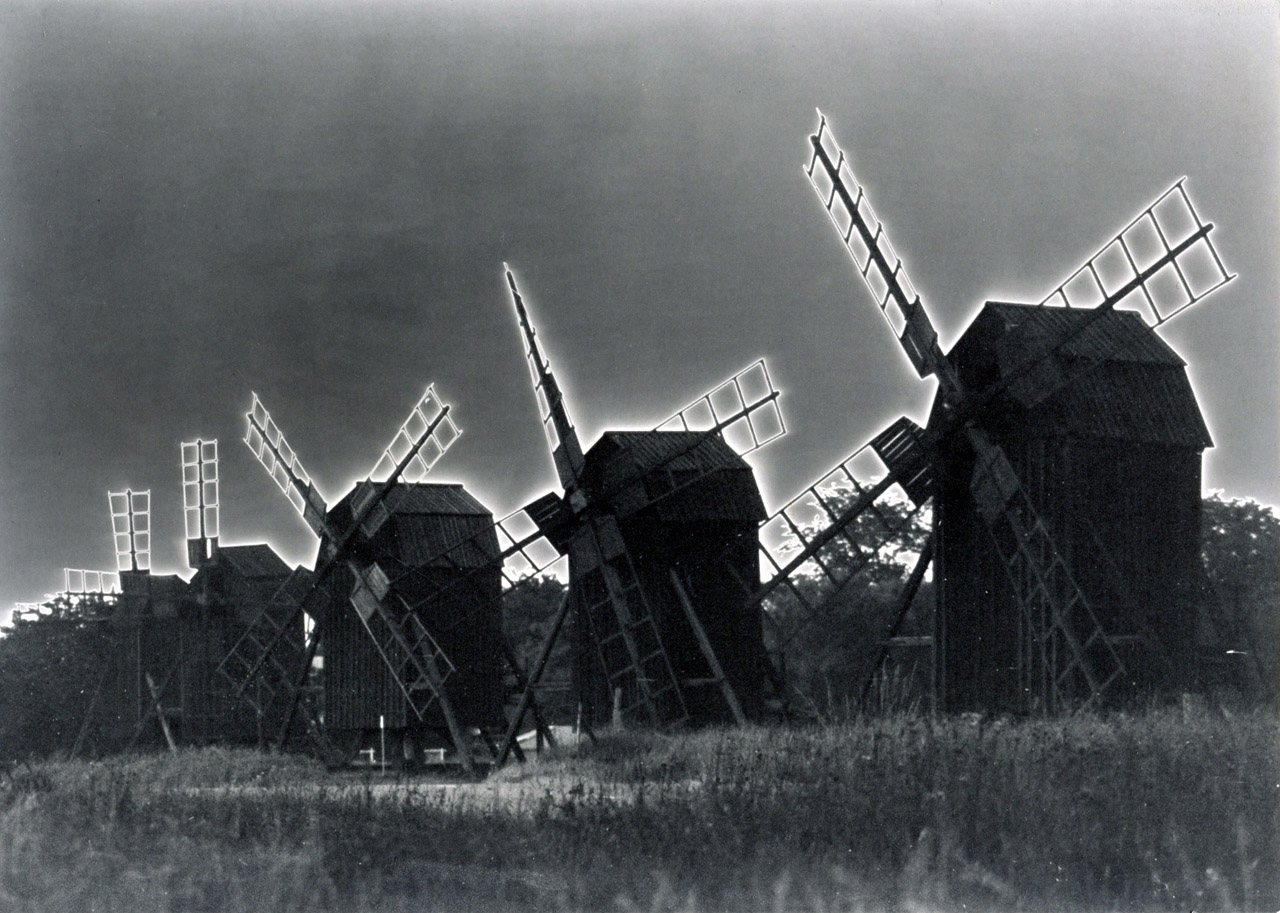
Pseudo-solarization of paper positive in darkroom

The Sabattier effect, also known as pseudo-solarization (or pseudo-solarisation) is a phenomenon in photography in which the image recorded on a negative or on a photographic print is wholly or partially reversed in tone. Dark areas appear light or light areas appear dark. Solarization and pseudo-solarization are quite distinct effects. Over time, the "pseudo" has been dropped in many photographic darkroom circles and discussions, but the effect that is meant is the Sabattier effect and not solarization by extreme overexposure.

== Background ==
Initially, the term "solarization" was used to describe the effect observed in cases of extreme overexposure of the photographic film or plate in the camera.

The effect generated in the dark room was then called pseudo-solarization. Spencer defines the Sabattier effect as: "Partial image reversal produced by brief exposure to white light of a partly developed silver halide image". Many other ways of chemical and actinic radiation "exposure" can be utilised for the partial image reversal. The use of chemicals for image reversal is also known as 'chemical fogging'. The SPSE Handbook of Photographic Science and Engineering describes the effect as follows: If a film that has been exposed, developed, and washed but not fixed is given a second uniform exposure and developed again, an image with strong border effects is obtained, which combines the original image with a reversed (positive) image. Another usable definition is by Wijnekus & Wijnekus: If an exposed, incompletely developed, and washed, but not fixed film is given a second uniform exposure and developed again, a reversal of the original image may be obtained. The reversal may be partial or complete, depending on the relative magnitude of the first and second exposures.

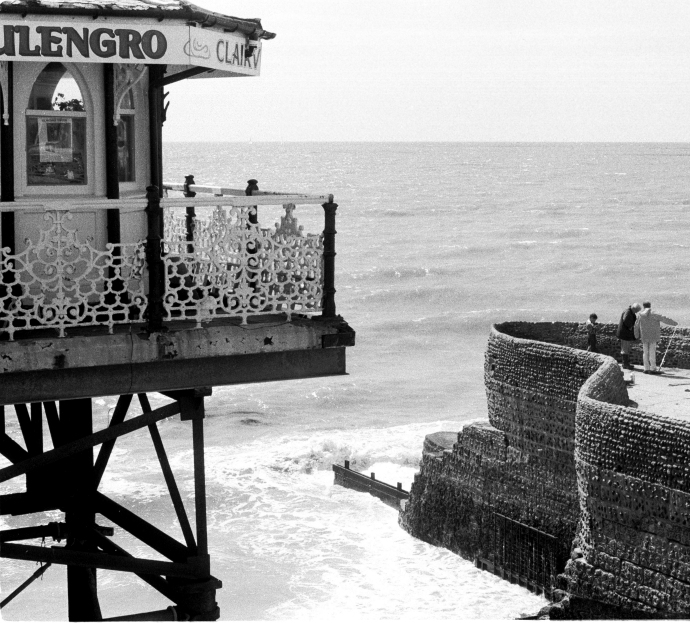
Normal print

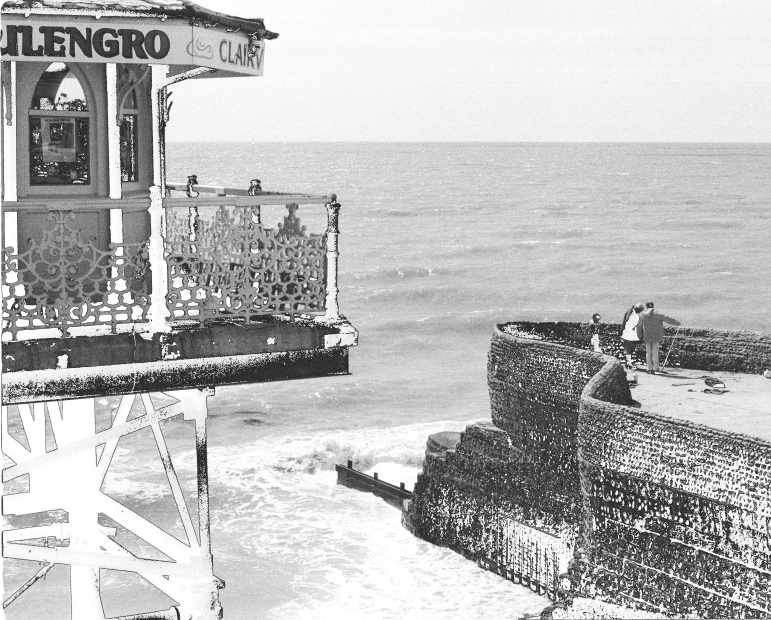
Pseudo-solarized print from the same negative

== History ==
The pseudo-solarization effect was described in print by H. de la Blanchère in 1859 in L’Art du Photographe. It was described again in 1860 by L.M. Rutherford and C.A. Seely, separately, in successive issues of The American Journal of Photography, and in the same year by Count Schouwaloff in the French publication Cosmos. French scientist Armand Sabatier published 26 October 1860 a process of obtaining direct positives (referencing Count Schouwaloff and Poitevin), but, according to the description, this process did not seem to have any connection with the Sabattier effect as no mention was made of any exposure of the collodion plates after development had started. The name of the author was erroneously spelled with double "t" and hence the effect is known as the Sabattier effect in most literature. Sabatier described the phenomenon correctly in 1862. However, Sabatier could not find an explanation for the phenomenon.

The effect was usually caused by accidentally exposing an exposed plate or film to light during developing. The artists Man Ray and Lee Miller came upon the effect by accident, and Man Ray soon adopted it as a technique, exposing partly developed photographs to light before continuing processing and often exploiting the halo-like outlines it creates around forms. It is evident from publications in the 19th century that this phenomenon was "discovered" many times by many photographers, as it tends to occur whenever a light is switched on inadvertently in the darkroom while a film or print is being developed.

== Explanation ==
Whereas many photographic effects have been researched and explained in such a way that most researchers agree upon them, the Sabattier effect does not belong to that group. In general the following facts are accepted by the community of photographic researchers:

- The assumption that the Sabattier effect can be attributed to the solarization effect can be overruled.
- The opinion that the Sabattier effect is a direct "print-through" effect of the silver produced by the first development on the below situated layers can not suffice to explain the effect. It has been shown that exposing a photographic layer through the base also displays the Sabattier effect. Moreover, chemical fogging is also proof that copier effect is only marginal in producing the Sabattier effect.
- Oxidation products produced during the first development at the developed grains cannot cause a desensibilisation of the unexposed grains.
- It is difficult to envision that the silver produced during the first development has a desensibilitating influence on the first developed grains. However this point must be further researched.
- Although with commercial photographic materials the speed of development of the latent image of the second exposure is greater than that of the first development, it cannot be the determining factor for the Sabattier effect.
- Several researchers assume that the development of a latent interior image as result of the first exposure thus affecting negatively the surface "specks" (also known as latent image centers) caused by the second exposure can partially explain the Sabattier effect. One of these researchers, K.W. Junge, published an explanation for the Sabattier effect as follows:
  The photographic material suitable for pseudo-solarizing should have a very low tendency to produce surface specks. This is usually achieved by prohibiting the chemical maturity during manufacturing.
  During the first exposure therefore almost only internal grain specks are produced. The first development will destroy the tendency to produce internal grain specks so that after the second exposure also grain surface specks are produced. These are only produced on grains which have still no internal grain specks. The reason for this is that during the second exposure electrons emerge which are much faster caught by the stable and big internal grain specks than they can serve to build new and smaller surface grain specks.
  The second development in a surface developer will now attack those grains which remained unchanged by the first exposure so that an image reversal will occur. The fact that instead of a second exposure electron donating systems (e.g. chemical fogging) can be added to the second developer supports this theory.

== In the darkroom ==
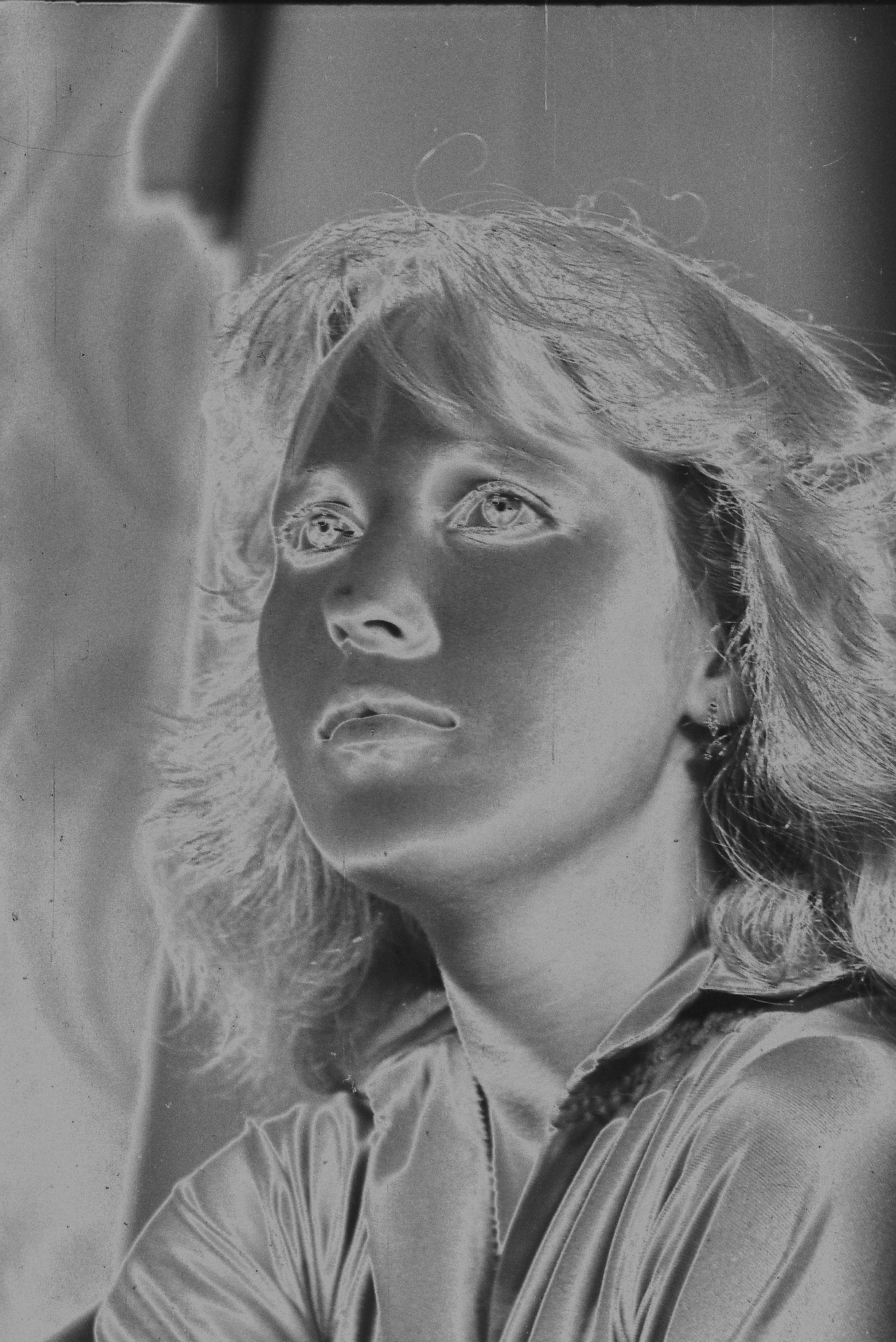
Pseudo-solarization of paper positive in darkroom

Careful choice of the amount of light used and the precise moment in development to provide the additional exposure gives rise to different outcomes. However, pseudo-solarization is very difficult to manage to yield consistent results.

As a guide, an exposure of one second to a 25 watt incandescent lamp at two metres distance at around the end of the first minute of a 2-minute development can produce acceptable results. If the exposure is made with the developing print still in the tray of developer, it is important to stop agitation at least 10 seconds prior to exposure to allow any bubbles on the surface to disperse and to ensure that the print is lying flat. Pseudo-solarizing colour prints is more difficult because of the more careful control of temperature and timing that is required and because most amateur processing is undertaken in a processing drum rather than a dish. An enlarger without a negative in the carrier can also be used as the light source. In colour photography, different coloured lights can be used to affect pseudo-solarization, but the results become even less predictable.

Because it is very difficult to control all the parameters of the Sabattier effect and obtain consistent, predictable results, other means have been pursued, such as Agfacontour and special pseudo-solarizing developers

In scientific photography it was observed that when using photographic films with very high contrast (also known as lith films), the image produced by the Sabattier effect exhibited a multitude of lines of various width, representing a specific amount of exposure within a certain range. This led to the use of the Sabattier effect in the fields of photogrammetry and equidensitometry.

=== Agfacontour Professional film ===
In 1970, Agfa marketed Agfacontour Professional film, which simplified the process of obtaining consistent results for images that looked similar to pseudo-solarized images and therefore it was widely used in equidensitometry and art. This special purpose film addressed the uncertainty of pseudo-solarisation results.

As of 2002, Agfacontour film was no longer being produced.

== In digital media ==
Early video synthesiser technologists concerned themselves with achieving arbitrary curves not limited by film chemistry. A goal was to extend the range of pseudo-solarization effects possible to a computer specified curve. They then applied the defined solarization curve to real time video images. A video lookup table was often used to implement this. Using this enhanced solarization technology, still photos could also be passed through a grey scale or colour lookup table with the advantage that the effect could be previewed and progressively improved, instead of a procedure based on darkroom exposure calculations applied on a one time basis to a volatile light sensitive film or print, as described above. This was an especial advantage for creating colour solarizations with 3 primary colours.

Graphs describing pseudo-solarization curves typically place input range of tones on the x axis, with black at 0 and white to the right, and the output range of tones on the y axis with black at 0 and white up. A curve then defines the input to output mapping. Manipulating custom curves in photo-editing programs such as Photoshop provide tools to mimic the Sabattier effect in digital image processing.

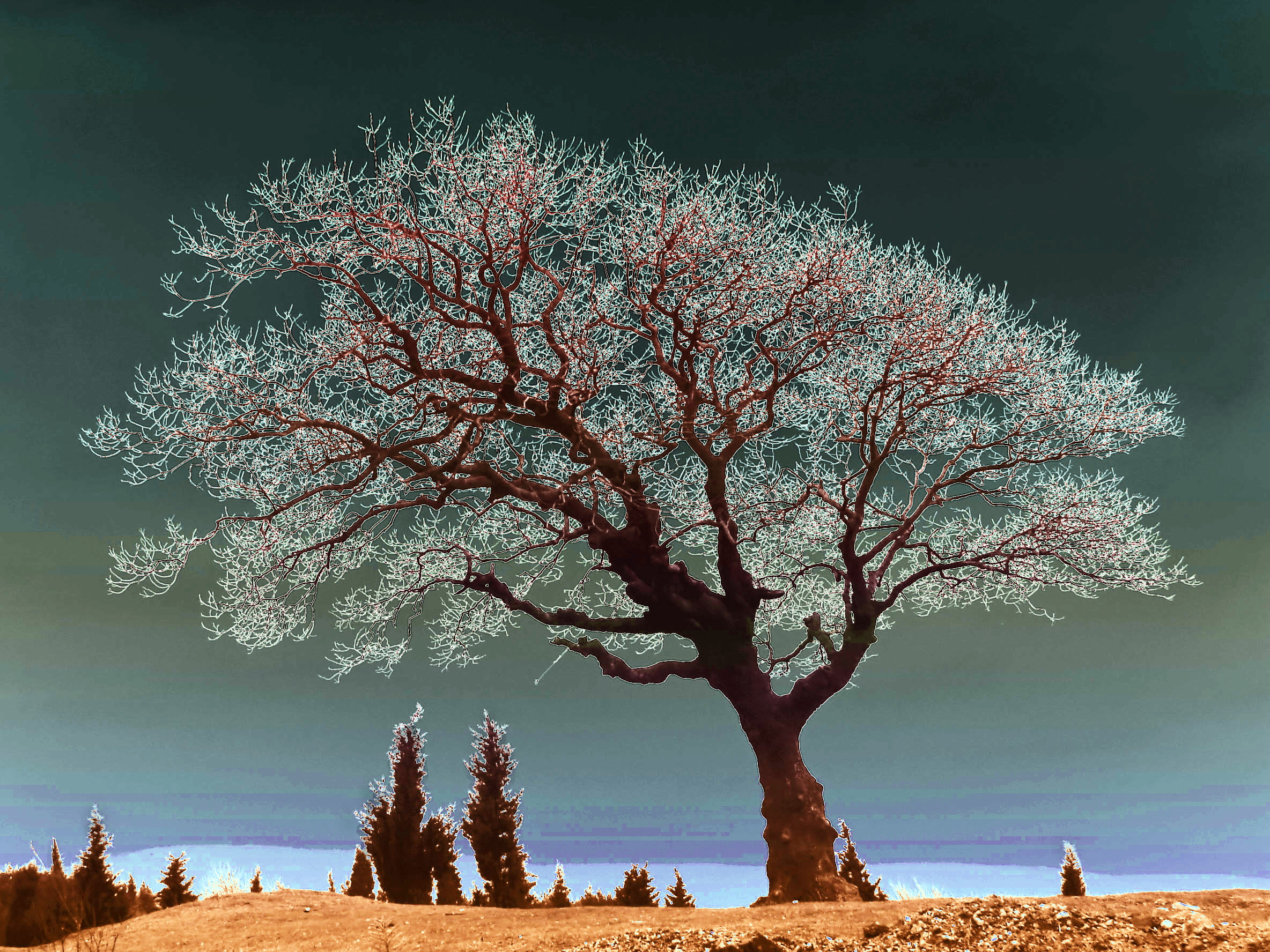
A digitally pseudo-solarized color image
