= Protestant Cemetery, Montpellier =

Protestant church operated cemetery in Montpellier, France

Le cimetière protestant de Montpellier
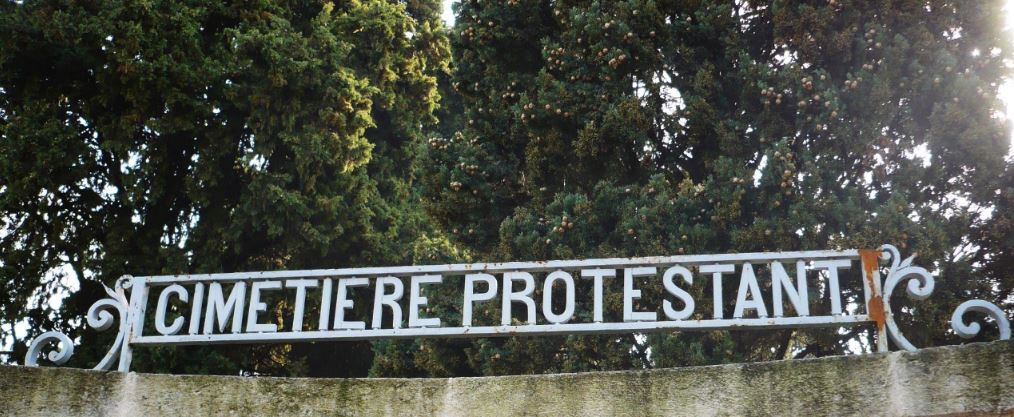
- The cemetery sign on the entrance gate
- Interactive map of Le cimetière protestant de Montpellier

Details
- Established: 1809
- Location: Montpellier
- Country: France
- Coordinates: 43°36′10″N 3°53′07″E
- Type: Protestant cemetery
- Owned by: United Protestant Church of France
- Size: 035 ha (86 acres)
- No. of graves: 1,472+
- Website: The official website
- Find a Grave: Le cimetière protestant de Montpellier

The Protestant cemetery of Montpellier (French: Le cimetière protestant de Montpellier) is a historic, church-owned and operated Protestant cemetery located in the city of Montpellier, in France. The triangular-shaped cemetery surrounded by high walls on Palavas avenue is the fourth and only existing Protestant cemetery in Montpellier, as well as being the oldest active cemetery in the city.

== History and description ==
At the start of the Reformation in Montpellier, followers of the new faith and converts to Protestantism were buried in the Catholic cemeteries. But in 1565, the Catholic officials applied to the governor of Languedoc, Henri de Montmorency for securing an injunction against Protestants from using the Roman Catholic cemeteries, and the new law prohibited the burial of Protestants on consecrated ground. Therefore, Protestants had to bury their deceased brethren clandestinely on private property until the Edict of Nantes granted the religious minorities some freedom which required city administrators to provide the non-Catholic citizens suitable land for their burial in a decent manner.

In 1565, the Huguenot gentleman, François des Urcières de Gaudette donated his private land to the Protestant community to serve as a burial place for his fellow Protestant countrymen. This first cemetery was seriously damaged during the siege of 1622 and was demolished in 1624 during the construction of the citadel by Louis XIII.

After the closure of their first burial ground, the Protestant community of Montpellier owned two more cemeteries which no longer exist today. The current cemetery created in 1809 is the fourth Protestant cemetery in Montpellier with an area of 3,500 m2, and the first burial was recorded on November 20, 1809, a 21-year-old woman named Marguerite Bouvier.

The cemetery was enlarged for the first time in 1824, then in 1856 and again in 1880 when a chapel was built on the cemetery ground.

== Notable burials ==
List is sorted in order of the year of death.

- Louis Médard (1768–1841), French indiennes merchant and rare books bibliophile
- Frédéric Bazille (1841–1870), French Impressionist painter
- Jacques-Louis Hénon (1802–1872), French republican politician
- François Perrier (French Army officer) (1833–1888), French soldier and geodesist
- Jules Émile Planchon (1823–1888), French botanist
- Gustave Chancel (1822–1890), French chemist
- Armand Sabatier (1834–1910), French zoologist
- Max Leenhardt (1853–1941), French painter
- Jeanne Galzy (1883–1977), French novelist and biographer
- Henri Victor Vallois (1889–1981), French anthropologist and paleontologist

== Gallery ==
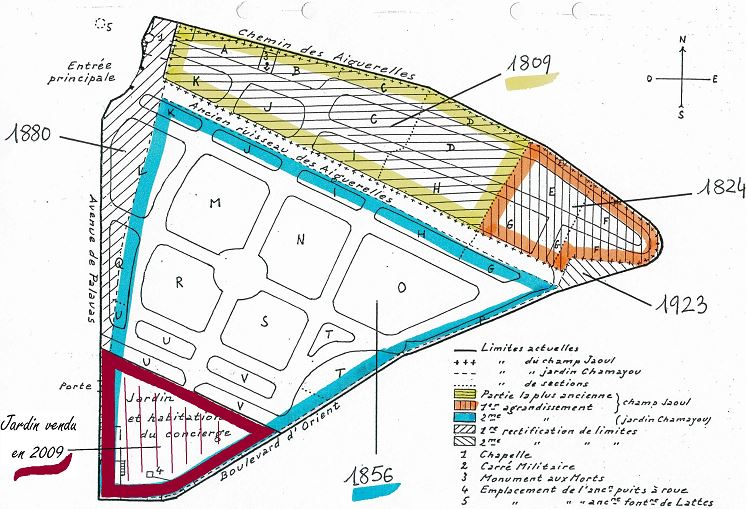

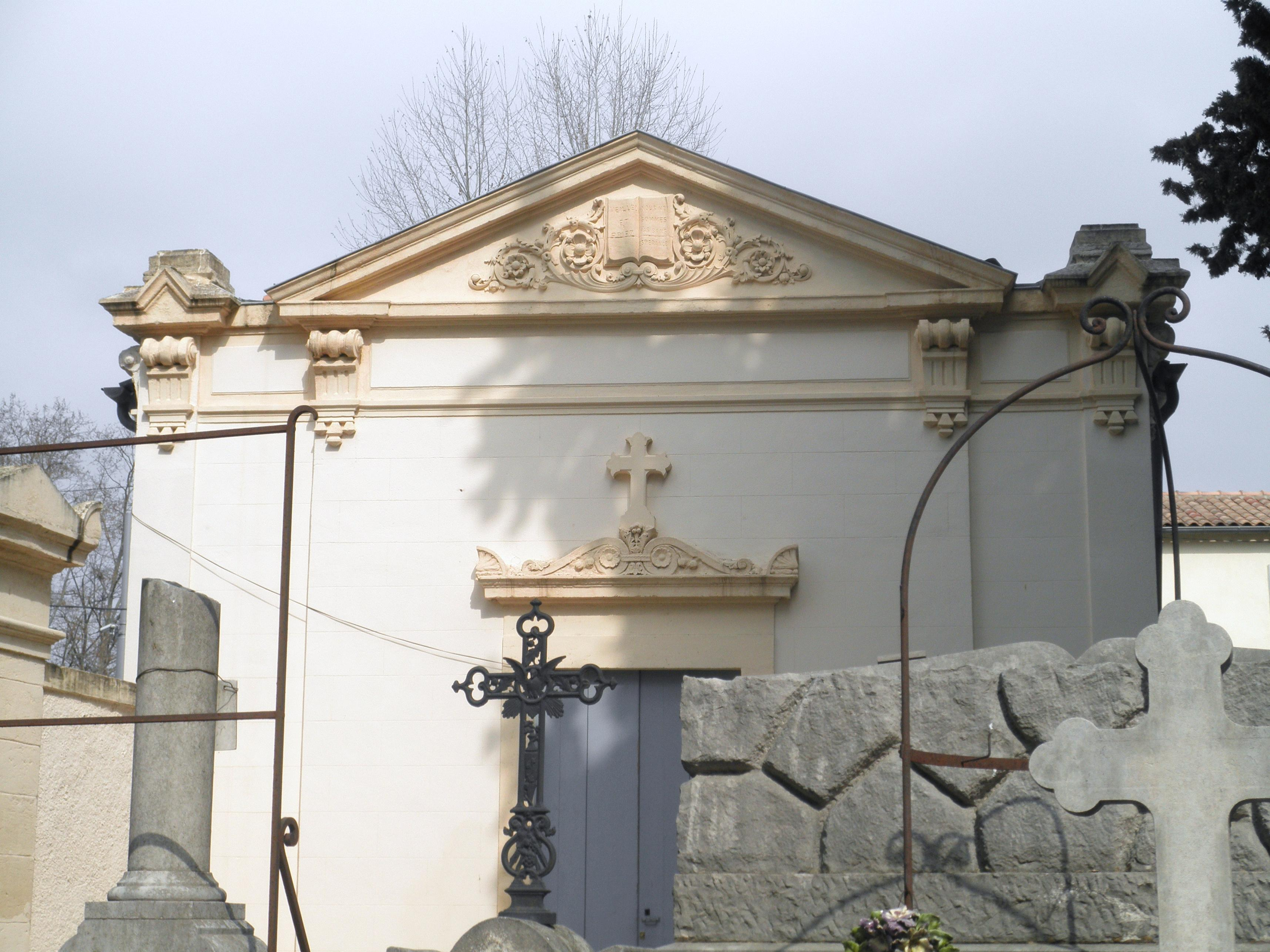

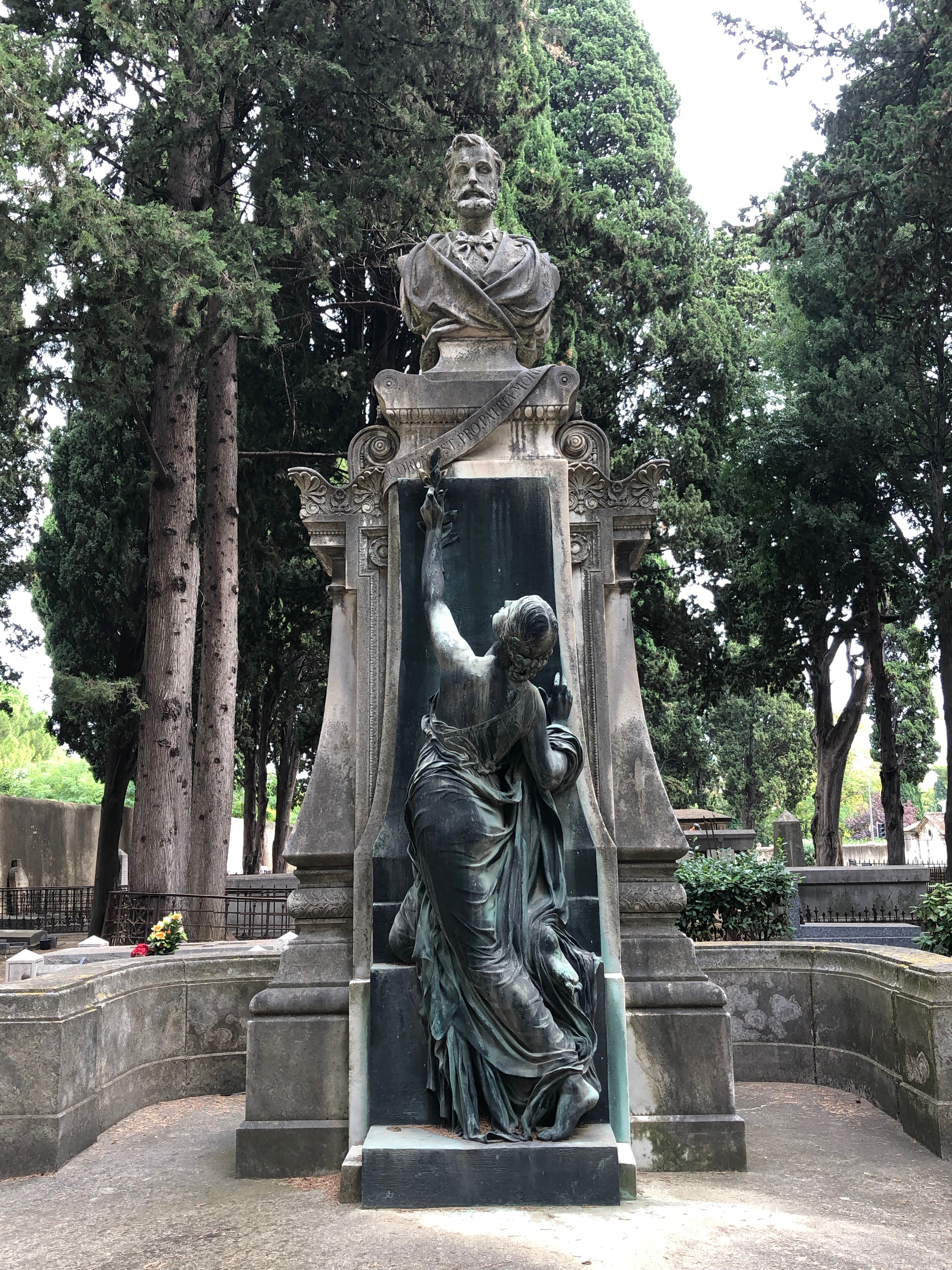

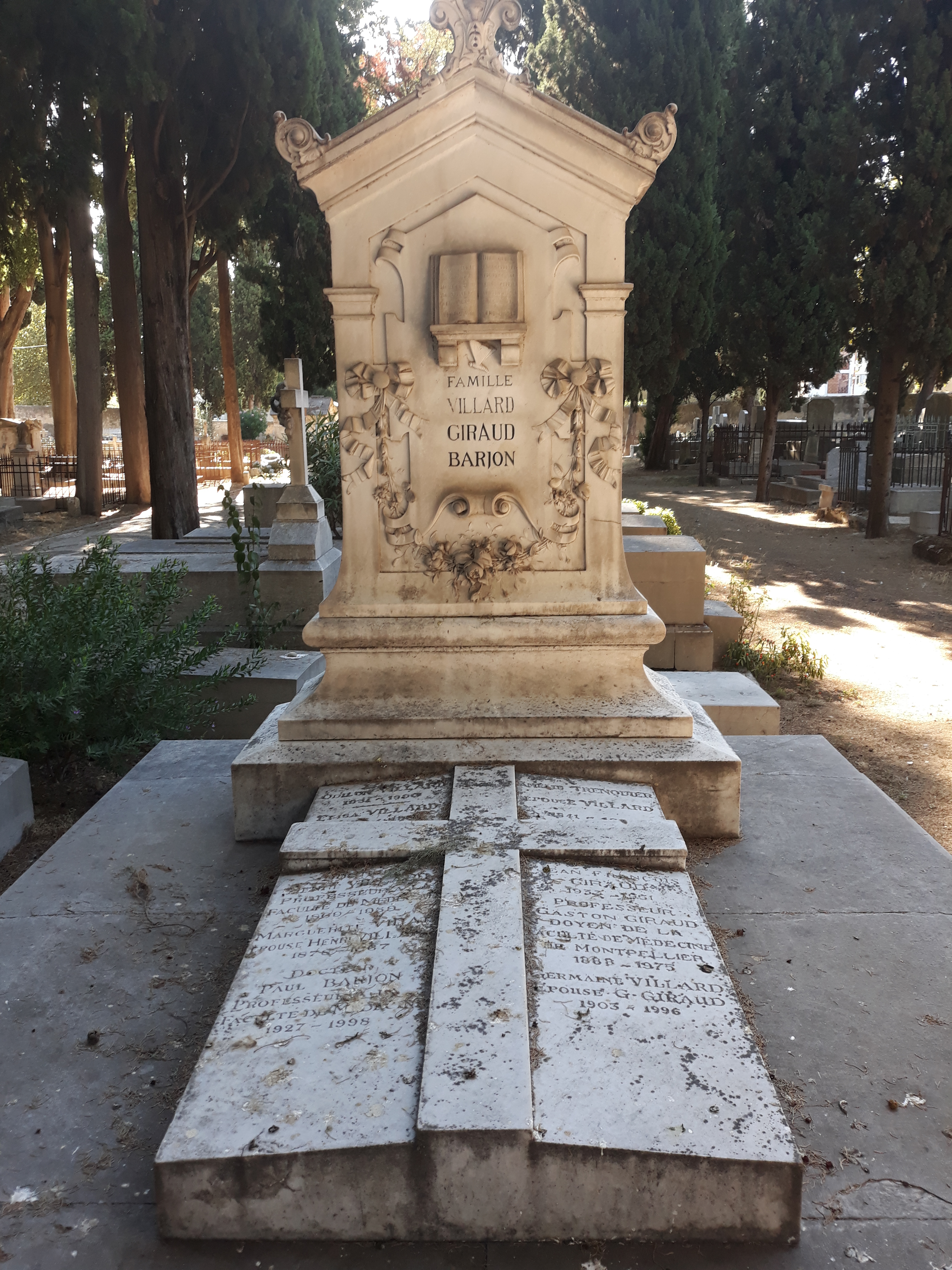

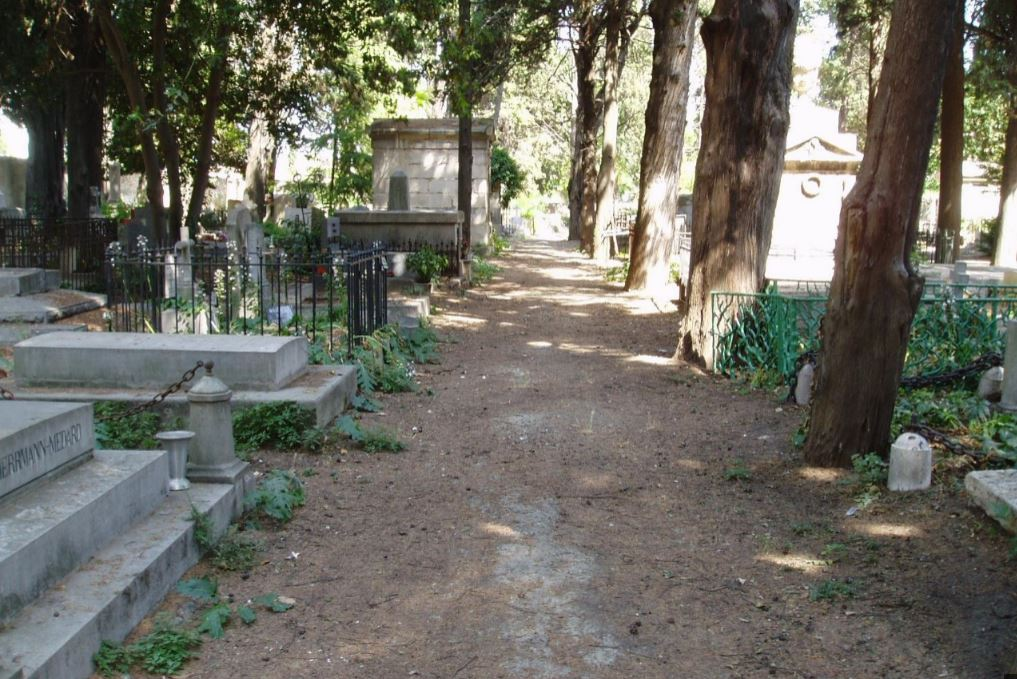

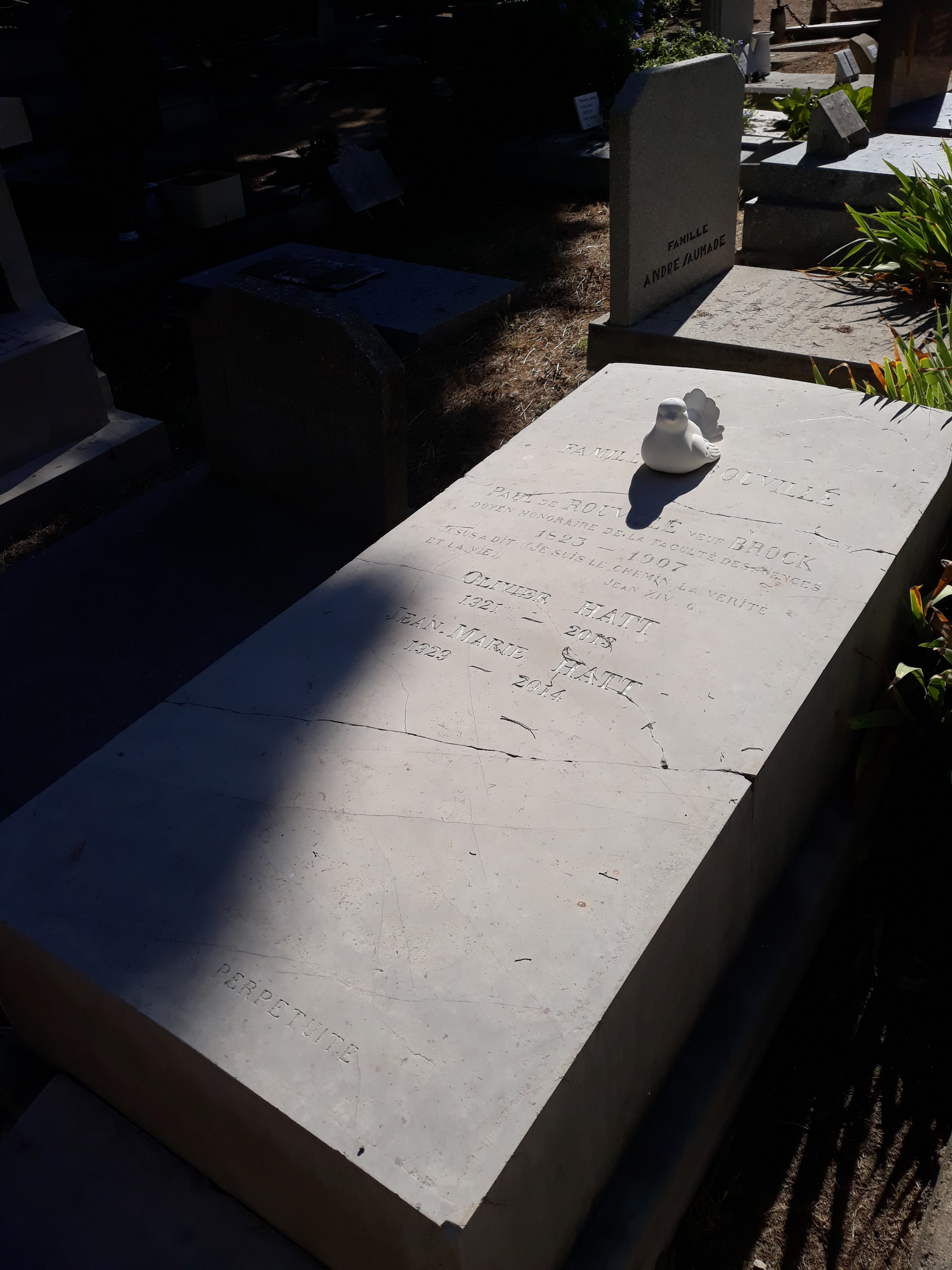

== See also ==
- Protestantism in France
