= Equidensitometry =

Technique of measuring equidensities

Equidensitometry is the technique of measuring equidensities in a photographic deposit or photographic layer, such as photographic films and photographic plates.

- Equidensities are points, lines and areas having equal densities also called isodensities.
- First order equidensities are points, lines and areas having isodensities obtained by applying one of the listed below techniques once, thus they exhibit one particular Density in the original
- Second order equidentities are points and lines having isodensities obtained by applying one of the listed below techniques twice, thus they exhibit two particular Densities in the original. Second order equidensities do not normally show areas.
- Equidensity series is a sandwich (in register) of a number of different equidensities. Usually each equidensity is coded by color or raster.

== Photographic and computerized image processing techniques ==
Four techniques of obtaining equidensities are:

- Tone separation process
- Sabattier effect, also called pseudo-solarization
- Agfacontour Professional film (discontinued)
- Computerized LUTs Manipulating custom curves (U-curves) in photo-editing programs such as PhotoShop provide tools to obtain equidensities in digital image processing.

== Applications ==
Interpretation or measurement of an image is sometimes aided by simplification of the density pattern. This results in data reduction and enables keying (areas or lines with iso-densities to unique patterns, grey values or colours). This keying to singular grey- or colour values is known in modern image processing as using L.U.T.s.

The fact that a certain density of a photographic layer has been caused by a specific amount of actinic radiation (visual light, UV-light, X-rays, autoradiography, etc.) can be used to qualify and perform spatial measurements of a physical phenomenon. A calibrated photographic process is used to obtain quantitative measurements as well.

Equidensitometry with Agfacontour made it possible to obtain reproducible equidensities similar to pseudosolarized photographic films and prints. The Agfacontour film contained two special emulsions with each different spectral sensitivity. Using color filters (yellow or magenta) during the exposure on Agfacontour one could control the width of the equidensity. By varying the exposure one could change the density in the image that showed on Agfacontour as equidensity. Although the material exhibited very low sensitivity (long exposures were necessary) the results were very reproducible and second order equidensities were sharp and clear, something that with pseudosolarization was almost impossible to achieve without special procedures.

In the following fields equidensitometry is used extensively:

- Photoelastic Stress Analysis, using polarized light and birefringent models of the object under test.
- Interferometry
- Astronomy (f.i. Nebula and Corona images)
- Thermography (today easily achieved electronically with thermographic cameras)
- Autoradiography
- Radiology (Mammography and other low contrast images of organs and bones
- Nondestructive testing in industrial manufacturing)
- Electron microscopy
- Plasma photography
- (Vertical) aerial photography interpretation
- Photogrammetry
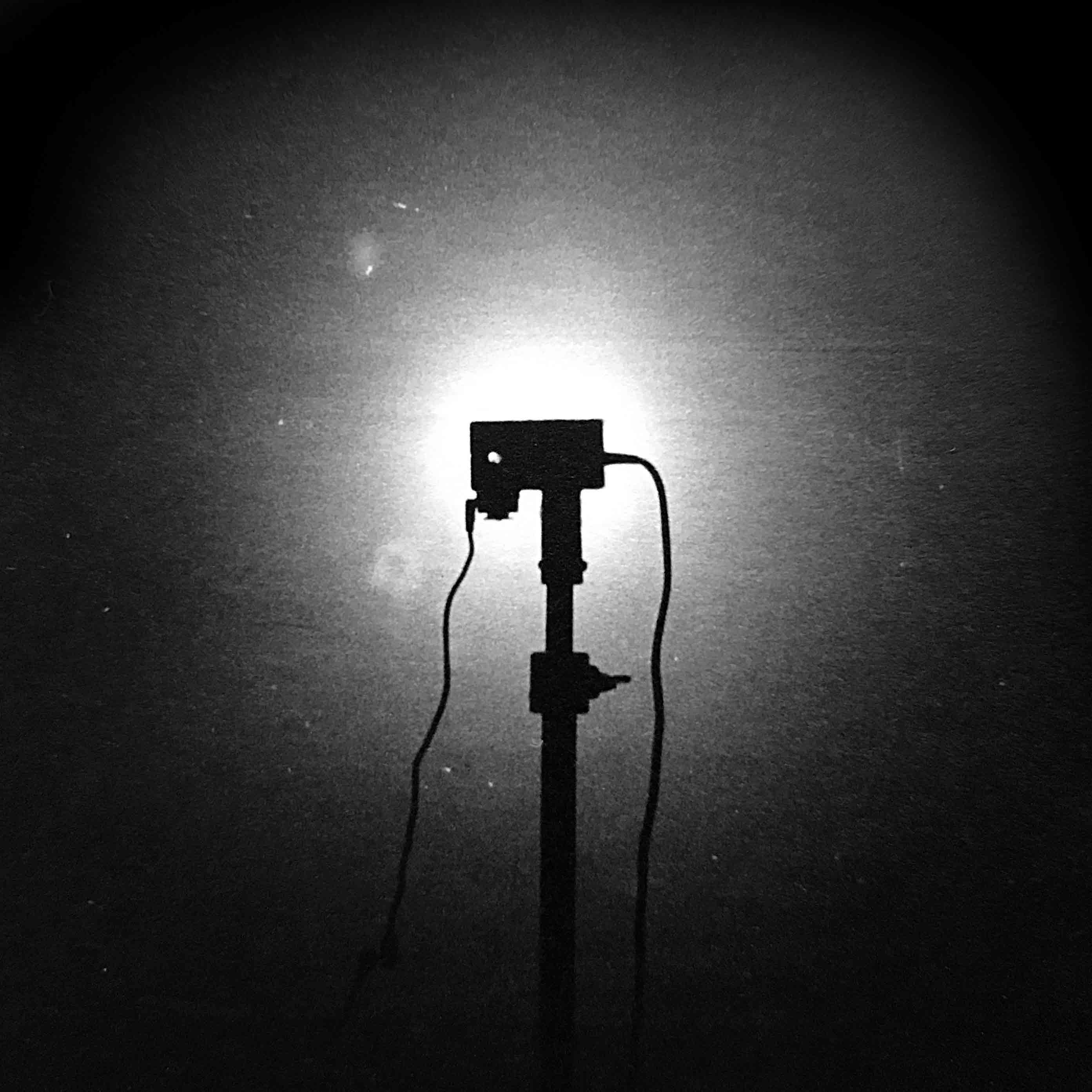
Flash against white wall

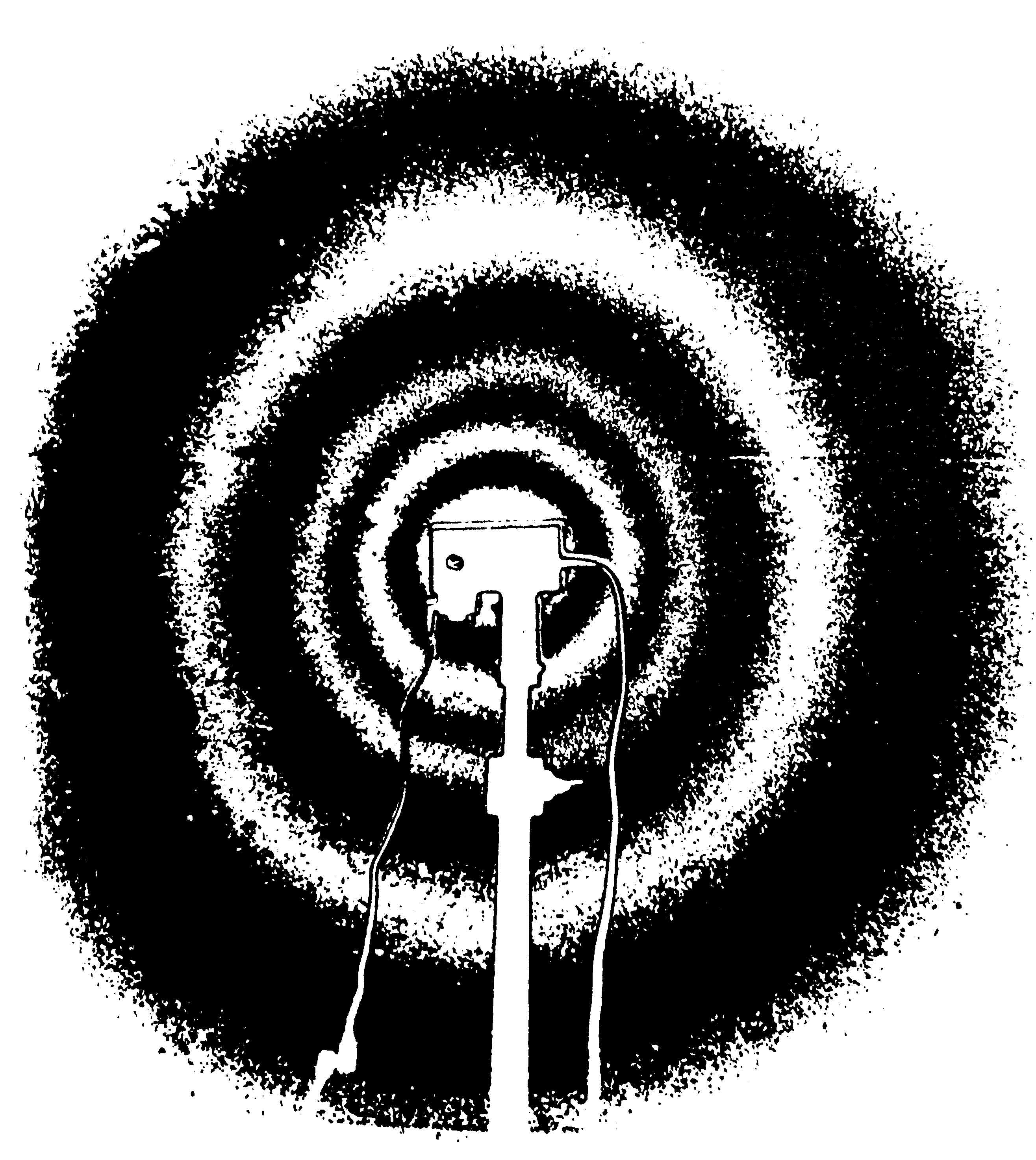
Flash against white wall, equidensities serie of the first order (sandwiching several equidensities transparencies)

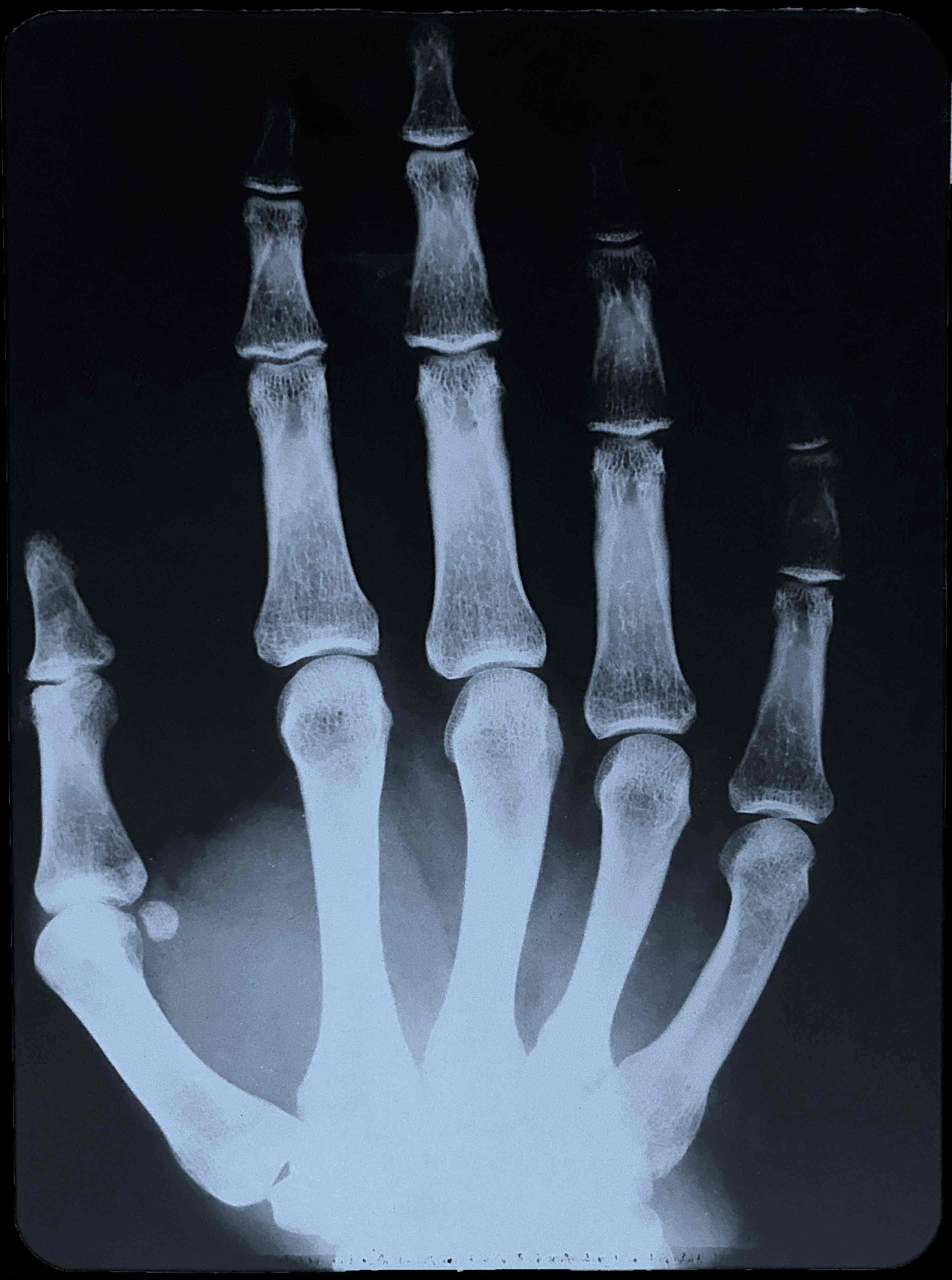
X-Ray image of right hand with no details in the bones at the bottom of the image

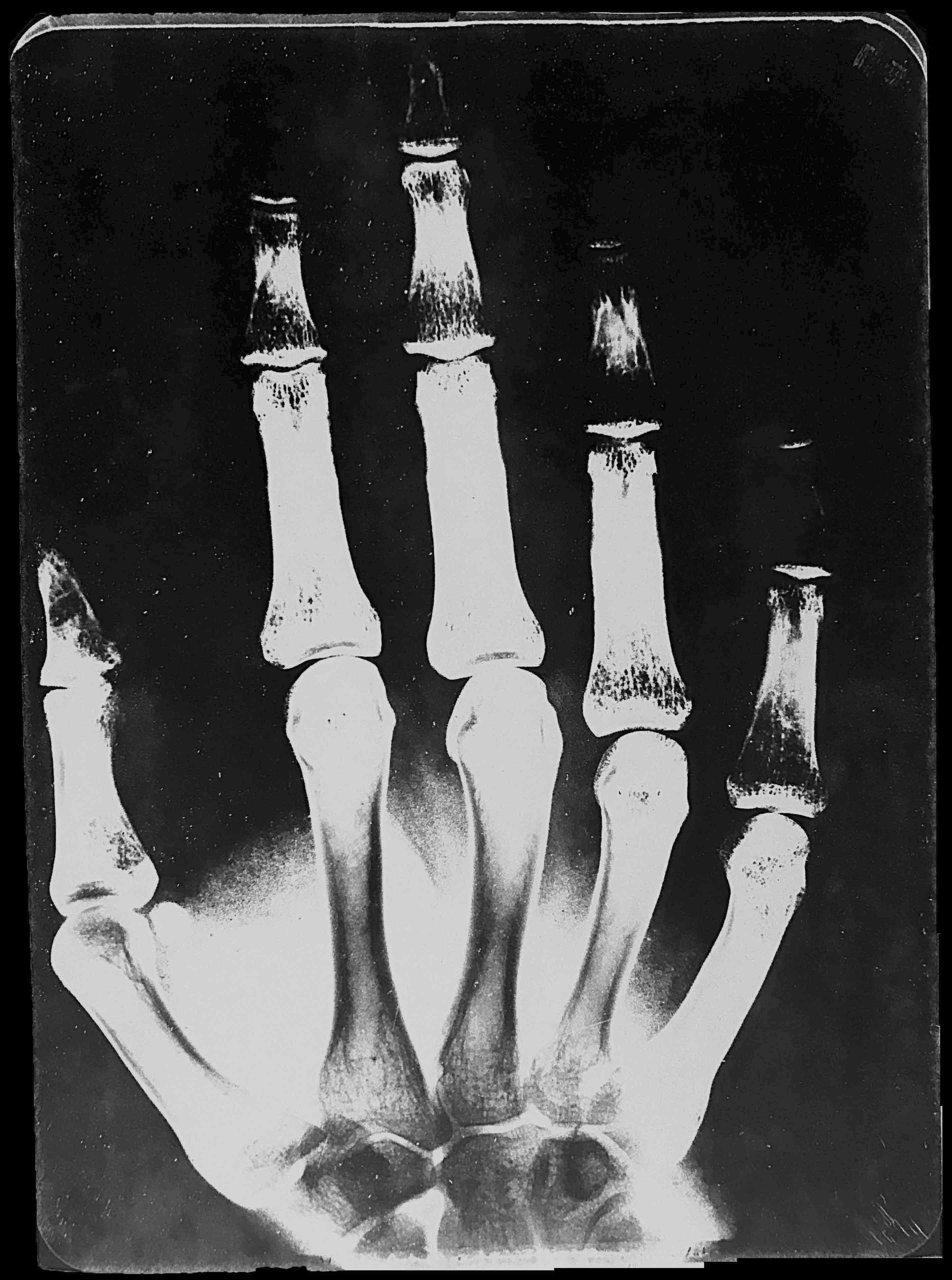
Original: X-Ray image of right Hand;
1st. order equidensities after pseudo-solarization of original

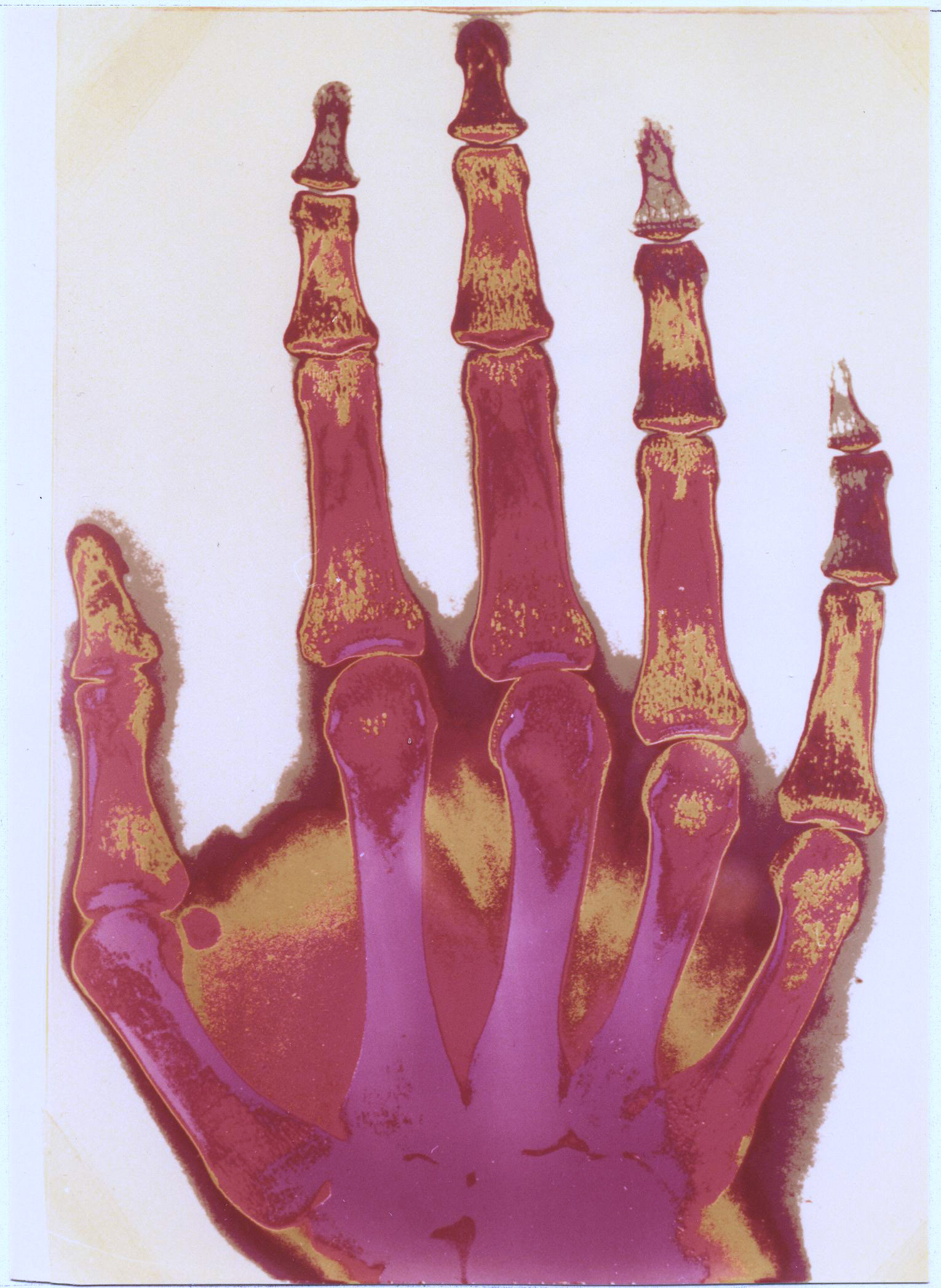
Original: X-Ray image of right hand;
colored 1st. order equidensity-series using pseudo-solarization, B&W copies chromogenic developed

== See also ==
- Densitometry
