= Armand Sabatier =

French zoologist (1834–1910)

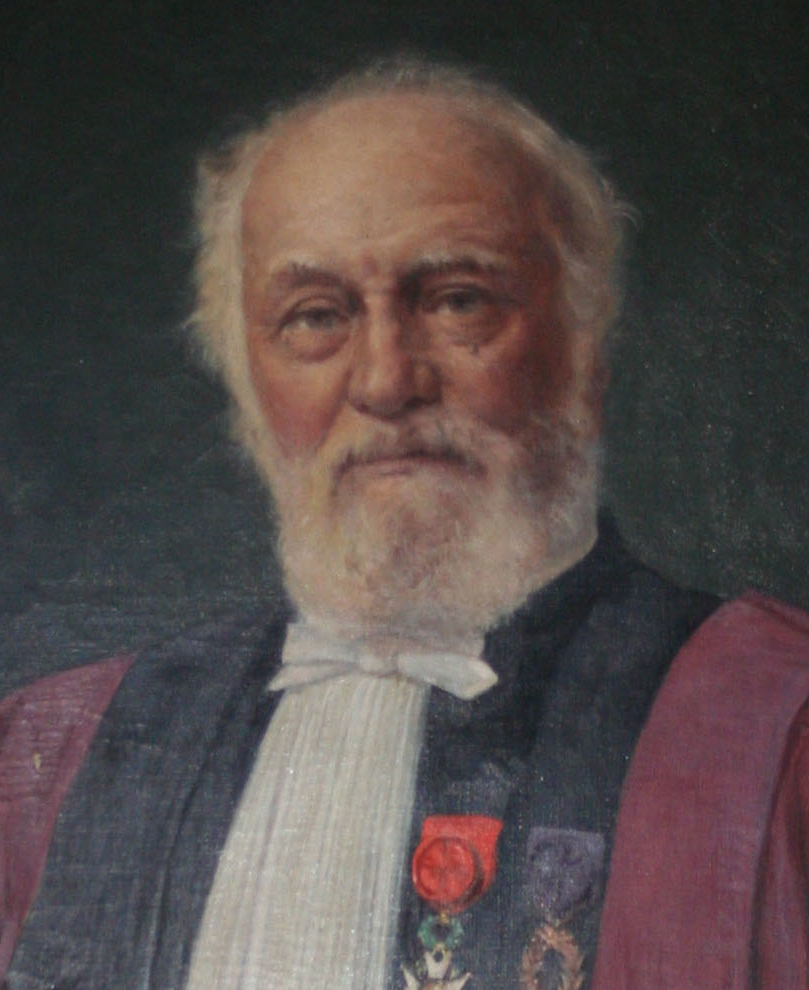
Armand Sabatier

Armand Sabatier (UK: /səˈbætieɪ/, US: /ˌsɑːbɑːˈtjeɪ/, French: [aʁmɑ̃ sabatje]; 13 January 1834 – 22 December 1910) was a French zoologist known for his studies of comparative anatomy of animals, and for his work in photography, discovering and publishing in 1860 the Sabattier effect, also known as pseudo-solarisation.

He studied in Montpellier, where he took special mathematics courses in high school, then enrolled in medicine. He then did three years of internship in Lyon, then returned to Montpellier, where he defended in 1863 his doctoral thesis of medicine, entitled "Anatomical, physiological and clinical study on pulmonary auscultation in children". He married Laure Gervais de Rouville and they had a daughter, Jeanne. During the Franco-Prussian War of 1870 he was surgeon in charge of the ambulances of the South. After the war, he prepared his doctorate of sciences, which he obtained in 1873, after defending his thesis entitled "The heart and the central circulation of the vertebrates". He was appointed professor and chair of zoology of the faculty of sciences of Montpellier in 1876. He was Dean of the Faculty of Science from 1891 till 1904. In 1905 he founded and managed the maritime zoology station of Sète. The sculptor Auguste Baussan made a bust of him which is situated at the University of Montpellier. The painter Edouard Marsal painted his portrait, situated at the Faculty of Sciences of Montpellier.

He was the founder of the independent Reformed Church of Montpellier. Sabatier supported the theory of evolutisme and gave a series of courses to the Protestant theology faculty of Montauban in 1884–1885.

He was a member of the French Academy of Science from 1835 till his death in 1910 in the departments of zoology and anatomy, and a member of the Academy of Sciences and Letters of Montpellier (1871–1886). He was buried at the Protestant cemetery of Montpellier .
