= Lith print =

A lith print is an alternative photographic printing process that uses infectious development to achieve its distinct look. Lith print usually has harsh and gritty shadows. In lith print development, formaldehyde is added to the developer, in order to lock excess sulphite that is used to regulate development in "normal" B&W print.

== Process ==
Lith print typically uses sometimes outdated Bromide papers such as Fomatone MG Classic, Fomabrom Variant III, Slavich Unibrom, and Moersch Easy Lith, see list of papers known to lith well (http://www.alternativephotography.com/lithprint-materials-update/) among many even rarer Bromide papers that have long since gone out of production black-and-white these often bromide formulated papers are in most instances developed with dilute lithographic developing chemistry (Moersch Easy Lith A&B, Kodalith sold in A and B powdered packages, and a few others also out of production developer (often heavily diluted 1:20 and 1:15 Working strength developer, and sometimes heated from 70F to 120F to reduce the reaction times that without heating can take hours to reach suitable development, but when heated can arrive in as little as 30 minutes) to produce a print with controlled shadow detail, based on when the print is snatched from the developer; during what is called Infectious development where the shadow tones ramp up in a logarithmic acceleration of silver halide crystal development, and equally controlled soft, bright highlights managed by the exposure time as a separate function from the shadow development (longer exposures yield more highlight details, and shorter exposure times yield brighter less detailed highlights. The effect has been described as "creamy highlights and hard shadows [...] an appearance not unlike a charcoal drawing". Tones, colors, and subtle hues different from standard black-and-white print can be achieved.
