= University Hospital of Montpellier =

French hospital

Coordinates: 43.629874°N 3.851400°E

The University Hospital of Montpellier (Occitan: Hôpital Universitari de Montpelhièr), CHU de Montpellier, is the oldest medical faculty in Europe, part of the University of Montpellier. It has been rated the 6th best hospital in France. It employs about 11,000 people and is the biggest employer in the region. There are 14 medical activity departments and very substantial research activity.

Emergency services at the hospital were reorganized in November 2022, largely as a result of pressures resulting from the COVID-19 pandemic in France.
