= Max Leenhardt =

French painter

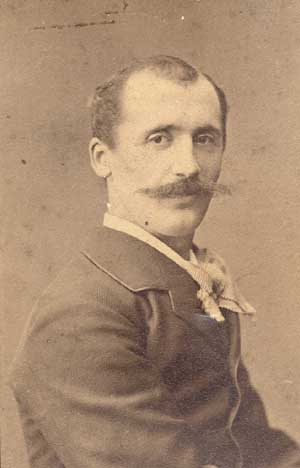
Max Leenhardt (date unknown)

Michel Maximilien Leenhardt (2 April 1853, Montpellier – 15 May 1941, Clapiers) was a French painter, known for landscapes, history paintings and genre scenes.

== Biography ==
His father was a bank manager. In 1872, he entered the "École supérieure des beaux-arts de Montpellier", where he studied with the history and genre painter, Ernest Michel. During his time there, he made a study trip to Austria. In 1877, together with his cousin, Eugène Burnand, he went to Paris, where he studied briefly at the École Nationale Supérieure des Beaux-Arts with Alexandre Cabanel.

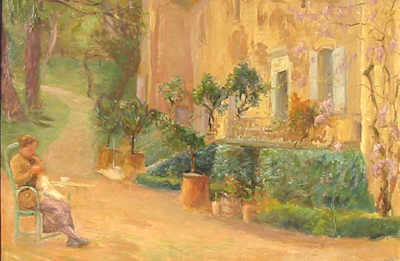
In Clapisses, near Aulas

Following that, he travelled throughout Normandy, visiting Mont Saint Michel, and Brittany. Upon returning home, he executed portraits of the professors from the Faculty of Medicine at the University of Montpellier. He began exhibiting at the Salon des Artistes Français in 1879 and would be a regular participant there until 1936.

He continued travelling in 1880-1881; across the continent to the Eastern Mediterranean, spending some time in Istanbul, then passing through Cairo and Piraeus. During his stay in Istanbul, he became friends with the Ottoman painter, Osman Hamdi Bey. In 1882, he made it to the second tier in the competition for the Prix de Rome.

He eventually settled in Paris, but made frequent trips home. During one visit, in 1888, he created panels for the Opéra national de Montpellier. Two years later, he married Marie Castan, the daughter of one of the professors he had painted at the Faculty. After that, he returned to Montpellier permanently and opened a studio. His wife died only three years later, while giving birth to their second son.

In 1900, he was one of numerous painters chosen to decorate the restaurant at the Gare de Lyon (now known as Le Train Bleu), creating a panel depicting Montpellier. Many of his works draw their inspiration from the history of Protestantism in France. He also did some illustrations, notably for Gens de la Grande Terre by Michel Leiris and, as did most French artists of that period, designed posters.

He died during the German Occupation and was buried at the Protestant Cemetery in Montpellier. The following year, a major retrospective was held at the Musée Fabre. A plaza and a street near his studio have been named after him.

== Selected paintings ==
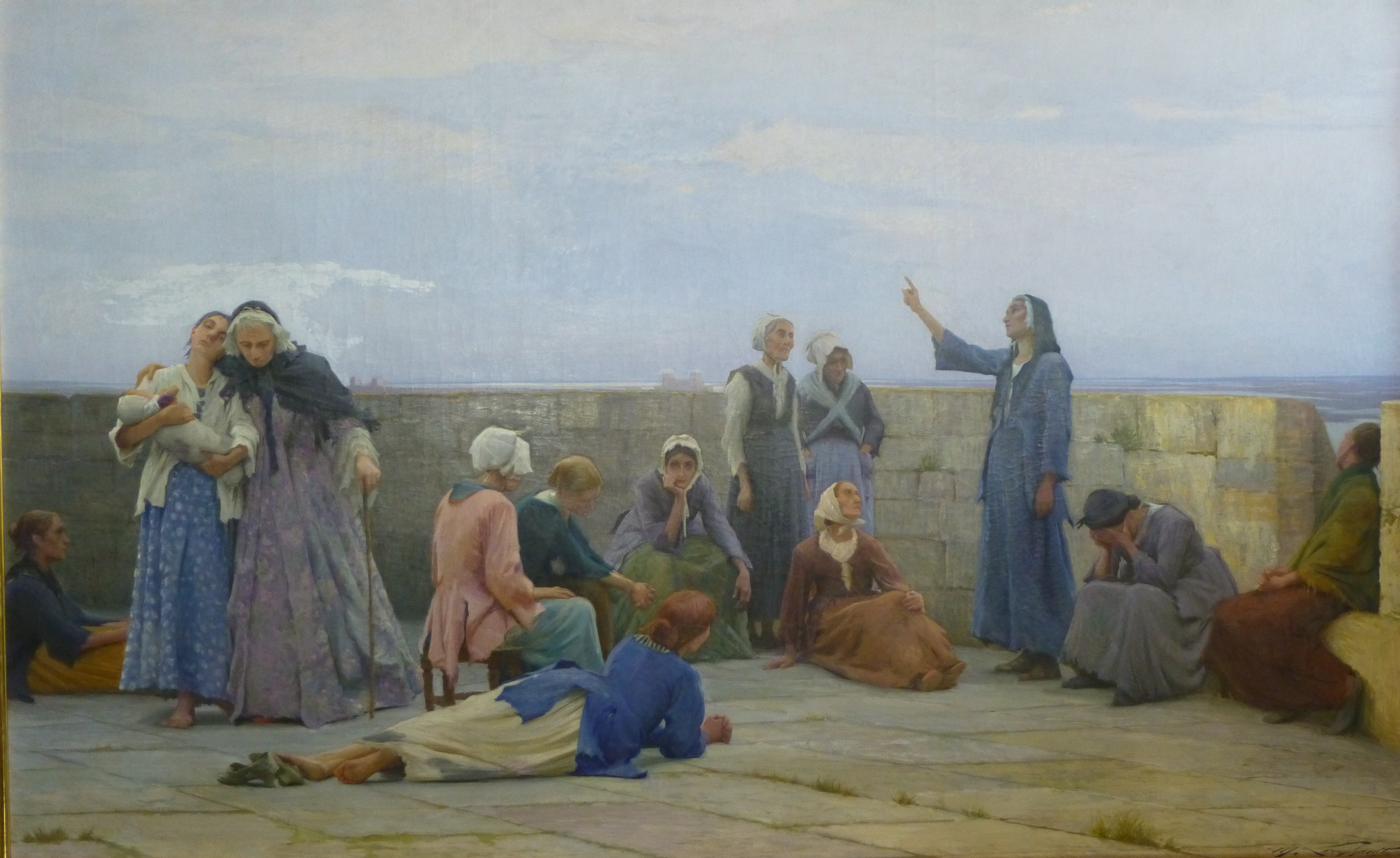
Huguenot Prisoners at the
Tour de Constance

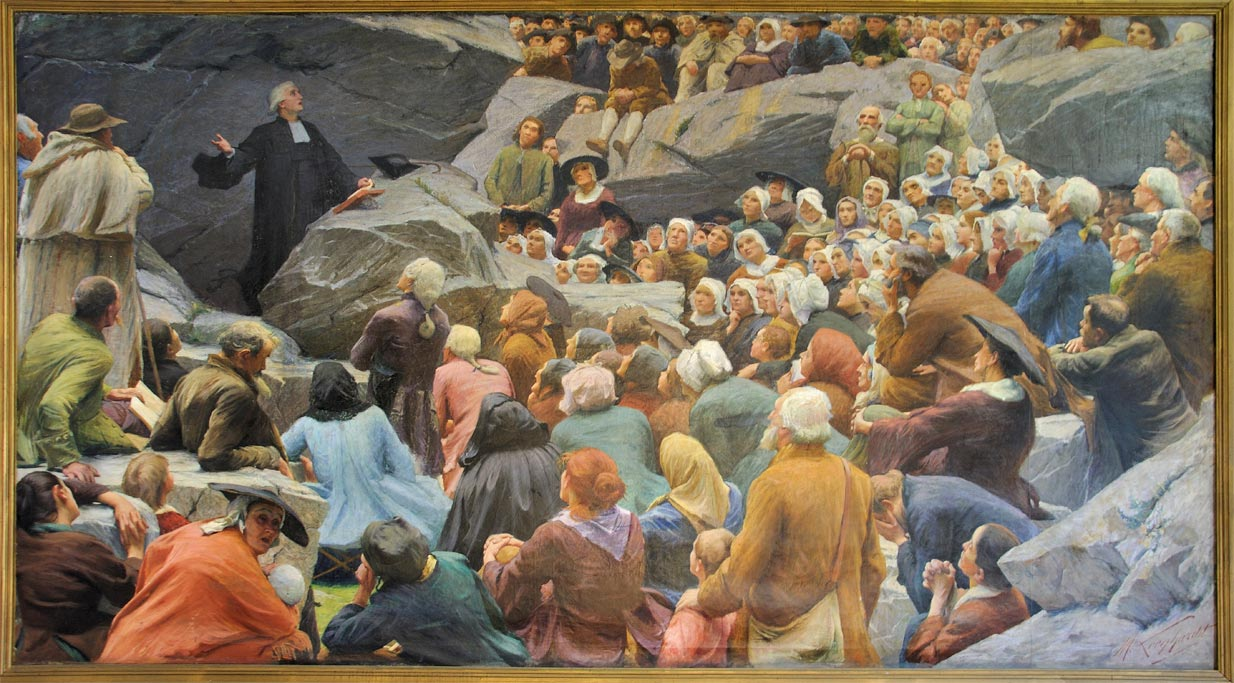
Preaching in the Desert

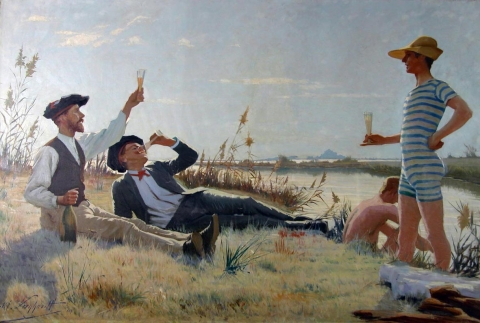
Students Celebrating the
Sixth Centennial of
Maguelone Cathedral
